= Revolt in the Stars =

1977 science fiction film screenplay written by L. Ron Hubbard

Revolt in the Stars is a science fiction film screenplay written by Scientology founder L. Ron Hubbard in 1977. It tells the space opera story of how an evil galactic dictator, named Xenu, massacres many of his subjects by transporting them to Earth and killing them with atomic bombs. L. Ron Hubbard had already presented this story to his followers as a true account of events that happened 75 million years ago, in a secret level of Scientology scripture called Operating Thetan, Level III. The screenplay was promoted around Hollywood circles in 1979, but attempts at fundraising and obtaining financing fell through, and the film was never made. Unofficial copies circulate on the internet.

== Plot ==
In the screenplay's story, which takes place 75 million years before modern times, an evil galactic ruler, named Xenu, massacres millions of people with assistance from Chu, the Executive President of the Galactic Interplanetary Bank, and Chi, the Galactic Minister of Police. Xenu's psychiatric advisers, Stug and Sty, help him gather "unwanted" beings from all of the planets in his control and transport them to Earth. The beings are stacked around the bases of Earth's volcanoes including Loa, Mount Vesuvius, Mount Shasta, Mount Fuji, Mount Etna and others, and exterminated by detonating planted charges of atomic bombs. In his script, Hubbard wrote: "great winds raced simultaneously across the face of Earth, spreading tales of destruction..." Xenu's massacre of these beings is called "Phase III." A character named Mish is one of the only "Loyal Officers" who survives Xenu's organized massacre, and other characters include Lady Min and a hero figure, Rawl.

== Connection to Scientology teachings ==
The story of Revolt in the Stars provides a dramatized account of events which Hubbard said took place 75 million years ago. In Scientology space opera theology, the villain Xenu (or "Xemu") addressed an over-population problem in his Galactic Confederacy by trapping beings, flying them to the volcanoes of Earth, then known as "Teegeeack", and exterminating all of them by detonating hydrogen bombs. The spirits, which Hubbard refers to as "thetans," were trapped in frozen alcohol and glycol and implanted with bizarre imagery. According to the story, they subsequently became attached to present-day human beings, in the form of "body thetans." Scientology teachings identify this event as "Incident II." Scientologists learn from OT III that by removing body thetans, they can progress spiritually and free themselves of problems. Belief in the reality of Xenu and body thetans is a condition for progressing beyond OT III along Scientology's Bridge to Total Freedom.

== Development ==
Hubbard wrote the screenplay in 1977, while living in seclusion in Sparks, Nevada with three members of the Commodore's Messenger Organization from the Church of Scientology. He went into seclusion in July 1977, and by December of that year, he had finished his work on the 140-page screenplay and was ready to begin the production of a film version. Revolt in the Stars was registered as a screenplay with the United States Copyright Office in November 1977, with Diana Meredith DeWolf Hubbard, Hubbard's daughter, listed as copyright claimant, and registered for release as a novel in May 1978, with Hubbard himself as the claimant. A former Scientologist and Sea Org member told the Los Angeles Business Journal that Hubbard intended to distribute the film publicly so that people inhabited with thetans would become "restimulated and upset," and be motivated to learn more about Scientology. Hubbard moved to the Scientology facilities at La Quinta, California and began production on Scientology training films which demonstrated the practice of auditing. A 10-acre (40,000 m^{2}) ranch in Indio, California was purchased in addition to a 140-acre (0.57 km^{2}) ranch called Silver. The Tech films were produced at the Silver location, and by 1980 Hubbard had made plans to film Revolt in the Stars and publicize the Scientology OT III theology.

Hubbard's screenplay for Revolt in the Stars was passed around Hollywood in 1978. A production company called "A Brilliant Film Company" and also called "Brilliant Films" announced plans, in October 1979, to produce Revolt in the Stars as an independent film production. The New York Post reported that the film had a $49 million budget, and was described as "a science fiction thriller." Bent Corydon writes in L. Ron Hubbard: Messiah or Madman? that millions of dollars in funding for film production of Revolt in the Stars was raised from investors, but he adds: "highly questionable methods of fund raising brought the project to a halt." Efforts to promote the screenplay and get it developed as a film were unsuccessful, and Hubbard focused on writing "Man, the Endangered Species" which later became the novel Battlefield Earth. This was produced as a feature film in 2000, starring John Travolta as one of the villains, but it drew hostile critical response and performed poorly at the box office.

Author Services Inc., the for profit subsidiary company of the Church of Spiritual Technology, controls development of Revolt in the Stars in addition to Hubbard's other writings. In a 1983 press release announcing that the independent feature film company Salem Productions Inc. had acquired motion picture and ancillary rights to Battlefield Earth in a deal with Author Services Inc., Revolt in the Stars is listed as one of Hubbard's "classics." Copyright was transferred in 1993 with the Church of Spiritual Technology and trustee for L. Ron Hubbard, Norman F. Starkey, listed as parties. Scientologist and actor John Travolta was involved in developing Battlefield Earth into a film of the same name, and in 1996 New York Daily News wrote of reports that he also wanted to develop Revolt in the Stars into a film. According to the website Operation Clambake, a synopsis of the screenplay was posted to the newsgroup alt.religion.scientology in 1995. Scientology critic Grady Ward published a summary of the material. The Oxford Handbook of New Religious Movements notes that Revolt in the Stars remains one of Hubbard's unpublished science fiction works but unofficial copies circulate on the internet, and this is confirmed in The Encyclopedic Sourcebook of UFO Religions and New Religions: A Guide.

== Analysis ==
In The Encyclopedic Sourcebook of UFO Religions, James R. Lewis cites Revolt in the Stars when comparing Hubbard's science fiction works to Scientology. "Scientology in itself would also be an interesting case for studying 'ufological' strands - e.g., the relation between L. Ron Hubbard's science fiction novels and the Whole Track mythology, which is probably most evident in the case of Hubbard's unpublished novel Revolt in the Stars," writes Lewis. Revolt in the Stars is cited in New Religions: A Guide, in a subsection on "Non apocalyptic ufology": "According to Scientology, a fierce intergalactic ruler named 'Xenu' carried the thetans to Earth." The author finds it interesting that L. Ron Hubbard explored the story of the "ancient ruler Xenu" further in the form of Revolt in the Stars.

The Washington Post reported that "The plot of 'Revolt' mirrors a sacred Scientology text called 'OT III.'" Former Scientologist Gerry Armstrong said that the screenplay story is identical to the Scientology space opera theology, and in his book Bare-faced Messiah author Russell Miller described Revolt in the Stars as "...a dramatization of high-level Scientology training about events which happened seventy-five million years ago when an evil ruler by the name of Xenu massacred the populations of seventy-six planets, transported their frozen spirits back to earth and exploded them in volcanoes."

Jim Emerson, editor of the Roger Ebert website previously hosted by the Chicago Sun-Times, compared elements of the Xenu story and Revolt in the Stars to the 2005 film remake War of the Worlds starring Scientologist Tom Cruise. Emerson noted that some critics drew parallels between War of the Worlds and Scientology mythology. In a January 2008 article in Frankfurter Rundschau, Christian Schlüter commented on the screenplay and recounted the Xenu story. Schlüter wrote that the Scientology mythology was appropriate for cinema and fit into the environment of Hollywood.
