= Marcab Confederacy =

Belief of Scientology

According to the beliefs of the Church of Scientology, the Marcab Confederacy is said to be one of the most powerful galactic civilizations still active. Church founder L. Ron Hubbard describes it as:

Various planets united into a very vast civilization which has come forward up through the last 200,000 years, formed out of the fragments of earlier civilizations. In the last 10,000 years they have gone on with a sort of decadent kicked-in-the-head civilization that contains automobiles, business suits, fedora hats, telephones, spaceships — a civilization which looks almost an exact duplicate but is worse off than the current US civilization.

The capital of the Confederacy is said to be "one of the tail stars of the Big Dipper", probably Alkaid, a star 108 light years distant from Earth. The Marcabians used to rule Earth at some point in the past but lost control of it due to "losses in war and other things".

== Marcabians ==
The Marcabians had an oppressive political system: "if [a person] was considered to be in contempt of court or anything like that, [he was] simply fried since there was a curtain of radioactive material which went clear across the front of the bench anywhere that a witness or anybody would stand, and so on."

The Big Dipper constellation, where Hubbard said the Marcab Confederacy are still headquartered today.

Hubbard said that the Marcab Confederacy invented income tax as a means of punishment, with the death penalty imposed for making even the slightest mistake in returns — "one comma wrong and it's 'dead forever'." The Marcabians also appear to have been distinctly socialistic, having "had plan balanced economies" (presumably some form of planned economy).

They were also keen on motor racing and every once in a while Scientologists undergoing auditing "will run into [memories of] race tracks and race-track drivers". Hubbard described this in some detail in a 1960 lecture:

They had turbine-generated cars that went about 275 miles an hour (443 km/h). They ran with a high whine. I notice they've just now invented the motor again. And they had tracks that were booby-trapped with atom bombs, and they had side bypasses. The tracks were mined, and the grandstands were leaded-paned.

The tracks were deliberately designed to be as dangerous as possible, with "a mountain that you went up to the top of and fell off", and death was commonplace, but participants in the races, and any other citizen, might be revived by the civilization's medical ability. According to author Russell Miller, Hubbard liked to reminisce to his followers about "how he was a race-car driver in the Marcab civilization". One of the people who accompanied him aboard his private fleet in the late 1960s described Hubbard's stories of life with the Marcabians:

LRH said he was a race driver called the Green Dragon who set a speed record before he was killed in an accident. He came back in another lifetime as the Red Devil and beat his own record, then came back and did it again as the Blue Streak. Finally he realized all he was doing was breaking his own records and it was no game any more.

Hubbard describes this in his lecture Create and Confront, describing multiple lives as a Marcabian racing driver, with color-themed names including "The Green Rocket", "The Red Comet", "The Silver Streak", "The Gold Bomb", et al.

Hubbard stated that the Marcab Confederacy was now using Earth as a "prison planet". When a person dies or "drops the body", his thetan is pulled into a Marcab-established "implant station" or "report station", where they are subject to brainwashing and reincarnation. Only Scientologists who reach the status of "Operating Thetan" are said to avoid this fate.

The report area for most has been Mars. Some women report to stations elsewhere in the Solar System. There are occasional incidents about Earth report stations. The report stations are protected by screens. The last report station on Earth was established in the Pyrenees.

== Described in secondary works ==
- Russell Miller recounted Hubbard's stories regarding the Marcab Confederacy, in his critical book on the man, entitled: Bare-faced Messiah: The True Story of L. Ron Hubbard.
- The Washington Post cited "an invasion fleet deployed from the Marcab Confederacy", in a report on John Travolta.
- A 2006 article in Rolling Stone titled "Inside Scientology", described the Marcab Confederacy as an "invader force". Rolling Stone said that it was explained as a vast galactic civilization over 200,000 years old, but appears as a duplicate of the United States civilization.
- A document in the Fishman Affidavit, presented as the original OT VIII, describes a mass Marcab invasion of Earth as coinciding with the appearance of the Anti-Christ. The Church denied the authenticity of this document, and it does not appear in the Operating Thetan documents leaked in March 2008, though the Church claim it as copyrighted material.
- Based on this, internet group Anonymous created Marcab-based art as part of its Project Chanology activism. For instance the Germany-based Marcab e.V.

== See also ==
- Space opera in Scientology
- Helatrobus
- Incident (Scientology)
- Implant (Scientology)
- Xenu
