= Body thetan =

Scientology concept of degraded and disembodied spirit

A body thetan or BT is a concept in Scientology of a disembodied thetan (being) that is stuck in, on, or near a human body. All human bodies are said to be infested by BTs, or clusters of them.

Scientologists believe body thetans came about approximately 75 million years ago through a catastrophe brought on by a galactic dictator named Xenu, as described by L. Ron Hubbard in a confidential level in Scientology called OT III. High-level Scientologists are told that body thetans are responsible for physical and mental ailments, and are told to telepathically exorcize them using Scientology auditing processes. (Note: Quote: "Scientologists later learn that many of these entities attached themselves to human beings, where they remain to this day, creating not just the root of all of our emotional and physical problems but the root of all problems of the modern world.") (Note: Quote: "What I was going to learn on OT3, was how to telepathically locate these other entities of mine and audit them through the nuclear explosion and implanting that occurred 75,000,000 years ago. Then these entities would be freed, and able to fly off and find a body of their own.")

== Overview ==
According to Hubbard, body thetans cling to another person's body because they have lost their free will as a result of a severe traumatic event called an implant which Hubbard alleges occurred 75 million years ago, and during which thetans were packaged into 'clusters' and attached to other people's bodies. On the OT III level, a Scientologist is instructed how to find body thetans or clusters by locating any sensation of pressure or mass in their body, then telepathically "audit" the body thetans until they release and leave.

According to Stewart Lamont, "these Body Thetans (BTs) and clusters cause undesirable mental and physical conditions in the human being to which they cling and the route to well-being and happiness lies in removing them". BTs are first addressed on OT III, then continue through each successive OT level through OT VII.

The information about body thetans is considered confidential, and available only to Scientologists in good standing who have reached that level and are 'invited' by the Church of Scientology.

== Secrecy ==
The [document] is to be kept securely under lock and key as Confidential Advance Course Material. The confidential data herein is not to be divulged, verbally or otherwise to anyone ... it is also not to be copied or reproduced.

Persons who have been grossly insecure in their handling of [confidential materials] or anyone making them available illegally to another may not be admitted on the OT Course regardless of the action taken at the time.

— L. Ron Hubbard

Often members of the Church of Scientology will publicly deny the existence of space opera doctrines, or attempt to minimize their importance. Because the secret information imparted to members is to be kept secret from others who have not attained that level, the member must publicly deny its existence when asked. OT III recipients must sign a waiver promising never to reveal its secrets before they are given the folder containing the body thetan knowledge.

It is supposedly knowledge so dangerous, as noted on the "Ron's Journal 67" cassette, that anyone learning this material before they are ready could die, though no evidence of such a danger exists in the wake of the OT III leak.

Despite the church's efforts to keep the story secret, details have been leaked over the years. OT III was first revealed in Robert Kaufman's 1972 book Inside Scientology: Or How I Found Scientology and Became Super Human, in which Kaufman detailed his own experiences of OT III. It was later described in a 1981 Clearwater Sun article by Richard Leiby, and came to greater public fame in a 1985 court case brought against the church by Lawrence A. Wollersheim. The church attempted to keep the case file checked out by a reader at all times, but the story was synopsised in the Los Angeles Times on November 5, 1985, and later detailed in William Poundstone's Bigger Secrets (1986) from information presented in the Wollersheim case. Church lawyer Warren McShane later claimed the story had never been secret, although maintaining there were nevertheless trade secrets contained in OT III. Notably, McShane discussed the details of the Xenu/body thetans story at some length and specifically attributed the authorship of the story to Hubbard. Audio recordings exist of Hubbard lectures that discuss body thetans and other space opera subjects.

Even with the Church of Scientology's persistent attempts at suppressing copies and suing people for disseminating the materials, the information has been released to the internet through various means including court records. As such, the Church no longer maintains exclusive control over the confidentiality of these writings from the general public—though they continue to maintain the secrecy amongst their members by spreading the idea that those who contact the information before being spiritually ready will be struck with severe illness and potentially death.

== See also ==
- Scientology beliefs and practices
