= Life of L. Ron Hubbard from 1975 to 1986 =

From 1975 until his death in 1986, L. Ron Hubbard lived in a variety of locations throughout the continental United States.

Having alienated most port authorities, and being in poor health, L. Ron Hubbard ordered his Sea Org to locate a new land base for Scientology management and retire the seagoing operations. In 1975 they purchased a large hotel in Clearwater, Florida, which became the Flag Land Base. Hubbard went into hiding while his wife Mary Sue ran the Guardian's Office.

During this period, his second son committed suicide, two Guardian's Office agents were caught in the act of theft at IRS headquarters as part of the Church's Operation Snow White, the FBI simultaneously raided two Scientology compounds on opposite sides of the USA, discovering 90,000 incriminating documents and tools of burglary and espionage. The criminal trial of 11 high-ranking Scientologists resulted in prison sentences for all, including Hubbard's wife Mary Sue. Hubbard was an unindicted co-conspirator and remained in hiding until his death in 1986.

== On the run ==
In his final decade, Hubbard hid throughout the United States, moving from Florida to D.C., then to Southern California.
Hubbard hid in multiple locations in Southern California.

In the summer of 1975, on the Caribbean island of Curaçao, he suffered a heart attack and pulmonary embolism. Hubbard spent two days in the ICU, followed by three weeks in hospital. The Apollo was banned from several Spanish ports and was expelled from Curaçao in October 1975. These events may have influenced Hubbard's decision to relocate back to the United States and to establish a "land base" for the Sea Org in Florida; that same month he rented a hotel suite in Daytona Beach, and the Fort Harrison Hotel in Clearwater, Florida, was secretly acquired as the location for the "land base".

On December 5, 1975, Hubbard and his wife Mary Sue "leased a quarter of the complex" at King Arthur's Court, a condominium off Florida State Road 580 just west of U.S. Route 19 in Dunedin. When they vacated several months later, they left behind a "cache" of unregistered weapons, including a Title II Mauser. It was later revealed the guns were released mistakenly after getting flagged by US Customs, and although ATF apparently felt it had evidence to support charges in the case, Assistant US Attorney Eleanor Hill declined to prosecute without specifying a reason, a decision which reportedly left Tampa's ATF office "furious."

Hubbard's presence in Florida was meant to be a closely guarded secret but was accidentally compromised when Hubbard revealed his identity to a tailor who was a science-fiction fan. When a local paper reported his whereabouts, he fled immediately for Georgetown, Washington, D.C., accompanied by a handful of aides and messengers, but not his wife. Six months later, following another security alert in July 1976, Hubbard left D.C. and moved to another safe house in Culver City, California. He lived there for only about three months, relocating in October to the more private confines of the Olive Tree Ranch near La Quinta.

== Suicide of son Quentin ==
On October 28, 1976, police discovered Quentin Hubbard unconscious in his car in Las Vegas, without any identifying documents. Although a hose connected to the tailpipe was found in the car's window, a test for carbon monoxide was negative. L. Ron Hubbard reacted to the news with fury, shouting, "That stupid fucking kid! Look what he's done to me!" Quentin died two weeks after he was found, without having regained consciousness. Mary Sue Hubbard told Scientologists that Quentin had died from encephalitis. L. Ron Hubbard is said to have deteriorated rapidly after Quentin's death, becoming disheveled and increasingly paranoid.

== FBI raid ==
On July 8, 1977, after two Guardian's Office (GO) agents were caught in the Washington, D.C., headquarters of the IRS, the FBI carried out simultaneous raids on GO offices in Los Angeles and Washington, D.C., They retrieved wiretap equipment, burglary tools and some 90,000 pages of incriminating documents. On July 15, a week after the raid, Hubbard fled with Pat Broeker to Sparks, Nevada. While hiding in Sparks, Hubbard authored a screenplay titled Revolt in the Stars based on the Xenu story and by December he was prepared to begin production. Hubbard's screenplay was passed around Hollywood in 1978.

In February 1978, L. Ron Hubbard was convicted, in absentia, by a French court for obtaining money under false pretenses. He was fined and sentenced to four years in prison. On August 18, 1978, Hubbard collapsed while filming in the desert. Suffering from a pulmonary embolism, Hubbard fell into a coma, but later recovered. Hubbard summoned his personal auditor, David Mayo, to heal him; Mayo recalled: "Hubbard considered the cause of illness to be some bad auditing he'd had just prior, so the idea was to find out what had gone wrong in the auditing and correct that — it would be a spiritual cure."

In April 1979, Hubbard went further into hiding, moving to an apartment in Hemet, California, where his only contact with the outside world was via ten trusted messengers. In August 1979, he saw his wife for the last time. Hubbard faced a possible indictment for his role in Operation Freakout, the GO's campaign against New York journalist Paulette Cooper. In February 1980 he disappeared into deep cover in the company of two trusted messengers, Pat and Annie Broeker. On October 26, eleven senior people in the church's Guardian's Office were convicted of obstructing justice, burglary of government offices, and theft of documents and government property.

== Hiding with the Broekers ==
For the first few years of the 1980s, Hubbard and the Broekers lived on the move, touring the Pacific Northwest in a recreational vehicle and living for a while in apartments in Newport Beach and Los Angeles. Hubbard used his time in hiding to write his first new works of science fiction for nearly thirty years—Battlefield Earth (1982) and Mission Earth, a ten-volume series published between 1985 and 1987. They received mixed responses; as writer Jeff Walker puts it, they were "treated derisively by most critics but greatly admired by followers".

In OT VIII, dated 1980, Hubbard explains the document is intended for circulation only after his death. In the document, Hubbard also teaches that "the historic Jesus was not nearly the sainted figure [he] has been made out to be. In addition to being a lover of young boys and men. he was given to uncontrollable bursts of temper and hatred". Hubbard mentions the Book of Revelation and its prophecy of a time when "an arch-enemy of Christ, referred to as the anti-Christ, will reign". According to Hubbard, the "anti-Christ represents the forces of Lucifer". Hubbard writes "My mission could be said to fulfill the Biblical promise represented by this brief anti-Christ period." Hubbard told his followers to preserve his teachings until an eventual reincarnation when he would return "not as a religious leader but as a political one".

External videos
- Nibs Hubbard testimony Day 1 and Day 2
- Nibs Hubbard interview (1983)
- Nibs Hubbard interviewed by Carol Randolph
- Jamie DeWolf reads grandfather Nibs's memoir

In May 1982, the City of Clearwater held a week-long series of hearings into Scientology; Nibs Hubbard testified. On November 6, Nibs Hubbard sued for control of his father's estate, saying that his father was either deceased or incompetent. His reclusive father was proven to still be alive, although he never appeared in court. In 1983, Nibs gave an interview with Penthouse magazine.

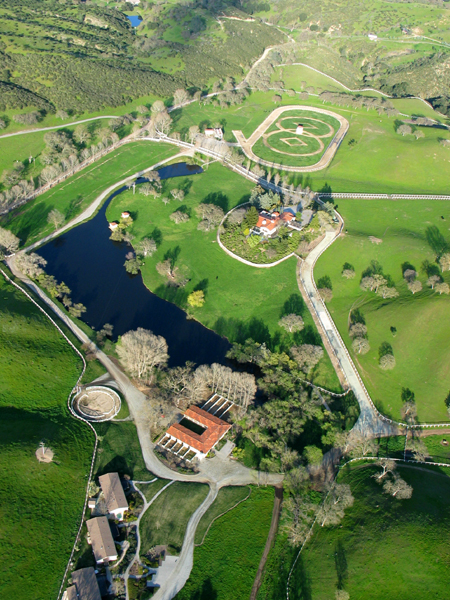
The ranch in San Luis Obispo County, California, where Hubbard spent his final years

For the last two years of his life, Hubbard withdrew from public life, prompting various rumors and media speculation. He spent his time "writing and researching" in a luxury Blue Bird motorhome on Whispering Winds, a 160-acre (65 ha) ranch near Creston, California, according to a spokesperson, and pursued photography and music, overseeing construction work and checking on his animals. He repeatedly redesigned the property, spending millions of dollars remodeling the ranch house—which went virtually uninhabited—and building a quarter-mile horse-racing track with an observation tower, which reportedly was never used. Hubbard suffered further ill-health, including chronic pancreatitis, during his time in Creston.

He was still closely involved in managing the Church of Scientology via secretly delivered orders between him and Church management, sending Pat Broeker as his representative to meet at prearranged meeting places, firstly with the Commanding officer of the CMO, and then finally with David Miscavige for the relay of information between Hubbard and Church management. and continued to receive large amounts of money, of which Forbes magazine estimated "at least $200 million [was] gathered in Hubbard's name through 1982".

== Suicide attempt ==
In September 1985, the IRS notified the Church that it was considering indicting Hubbard for tax fraud. In December 1985, Hubbard allegedly attempted suicide by e-meter, according to ranch caretaker Sarge Pfauth. According to Pfauth, Hubbard announced that he had "failed" his mission on Earth and was planning on "dropping his body". He announced he was not coming back to Earth, and requested that Pfauth construct a high-voltage "suicide machine" that would kill the user's body. Pfauth then provided Hubbard with a high-voltage, low-current e-meter designed to "just to scare him". According to Pfauth, Hubbard did attempt to kill himself with the device — Hubbard flipped the higher-voltage switch and burned out the meter.

== Final stroke and death ==
On Friday, January 17, 1986, Hubbard suffered a stroke, resulting in Dysphasia. His doctor, was apparently on a gambling trip with other Church executives the prior week.

Just over a week later, on Saturday, January 25, the Reis Chapel mortuary service of San Luis Obispo was contacted to retrieve a body from the ranch in Creston. Gene Denk, Hubbard's personal physician, signed the death certificate listing cause of death as cerebral hemorrhage and provided a certificate of religious belief that forbade an autopsy. Proprietors contacted the Sheriff-Coroner, who ordered the body to be photographed, fingerprinted, and examined by an independent pathologist, and tested for toxicology. Authorities were presented with a Will dated January 23 — days after a stroke affected his ability to communicate, only one day before his death. Toxicology screen was clean except for Vistaril, which Dr. Denk had previously reported administering to Hubbard in his final days. Finally, the body was released for cremation; the following day, Hubbard's ashes were scattered by small boat over the Pacific Ocean.

=== Alleged promotion order ===
After Hubbard's death, the Broekers presented a memo, said to have been written by Hubbard before he died, in which Hubbard specified that Pat and Annie Broeker should succeed him as the heads of the Church following his death. In that order, Hubbard reportedly promoted himself to Admiral and appointed the Broekers as First and Second Loyal Officers, two new positions not on any existing Scientology Organization chart. 14 months later however, the Broekers were removed and Miscavige assumed the leadership position himself, giving himself the title of "Chairman of the Board." On 18 April 1988 Miscavige published a follow-up memo stating that the original memo was a forgery and was cancelled.
