= Operating Thetan =

Scientology's advanced levels

- Symbol for Operating Thetan
- Type: Status in Scientology
- Description: A series of confidential advanced levels intended to increase a thetan's spiritual abilities
- Levels: OT I–OT VIII
- Key texts: Confidential OT course materials (released through court cases and leaks)
- Associated controversies: Secrecy, high cost, and legal disputes over leaked documents

Operating Thetan (OT) is a concept in Scientology referring to a state of spiritual ability in which a person is said to be "cause over life, thought, matter, energy, space and time". After reaching the state of Clear, Scientologists may progress through a series of confidential OT levels that the Church of Scientology presents as advanced spiritual training. These levels, numbered OT I through OT VIII, are available only at designated service organizations and require substantial financial outlay.

The OT writings have been a major source of controversy due to their secrecy, high cost, and the Church's efforts to prevent their disclosure. Although the Church maintains that premature exposure to the material is dangerous, most OT documents from levels I-VIII have entered the public domain through court cases and internet leaks. Scholars of religion describe the OT system as a modern form of esoteric initiation, drawing on themes of past-life trauma, cosmic history, and the thetan's recovery of innate powers.

OT III, known as the "Wall of Fire", is the most widely discussed level and contains Scientology's account of a catastrophic event 75 million years ago involving the Galactic Confederacy. OT VIII was released after L. Ron Hubbard's death and is the highest level offered. Scientology publications list additional OT levels beyond VIII, but no authenticated content exists, and former senior officials state that Hubbard never produced material for higher levels.

Critics and former high-ranking Scientologists argue that the OT levels promise extraordinary abilities that do not materialize, and that the Church uses the prospect of unreleased levels to encourage continued donations and purchases of training courses. Legal disputes over leaked OT documents, particularly in the 1980s and 1990s, played a significant role in the broader conflict between Scientology and the Internet.

== Description ==
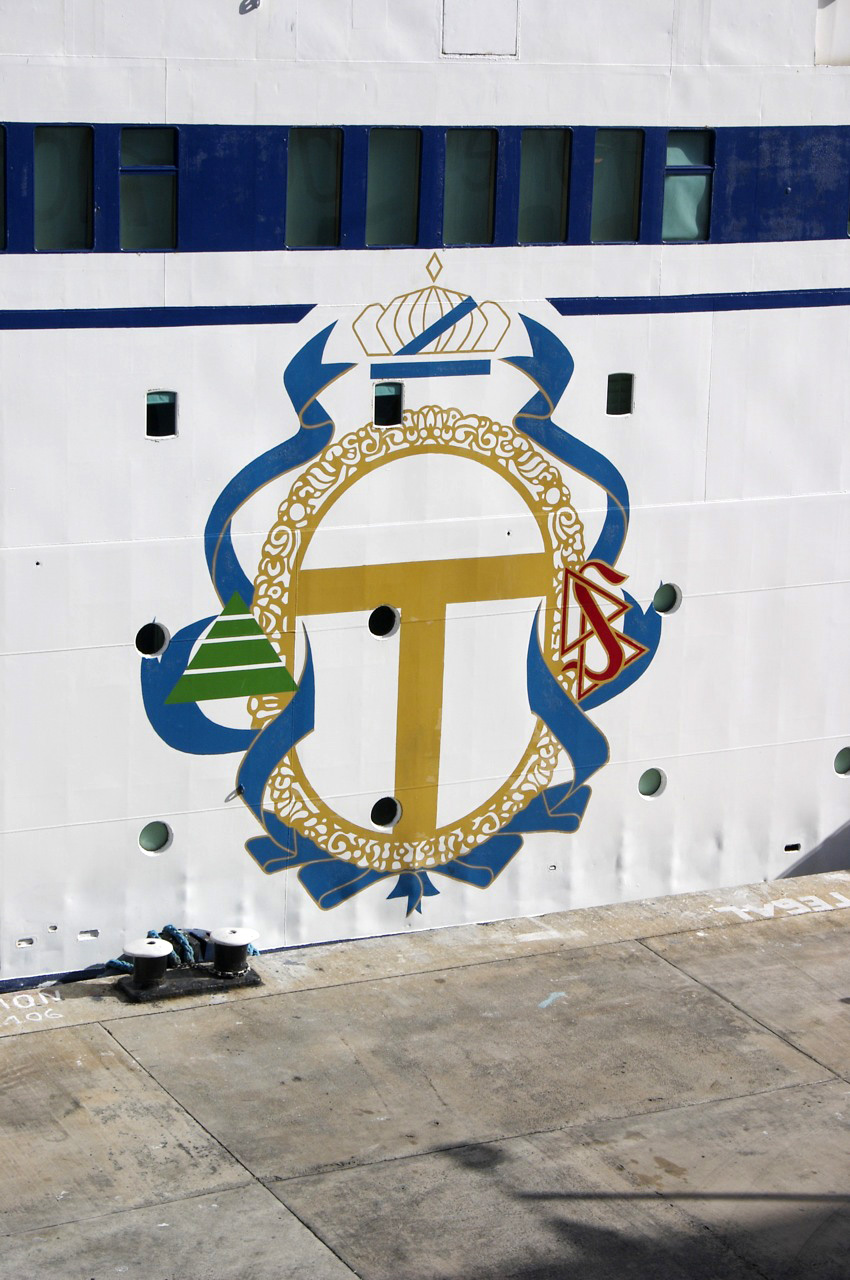
The OT symbol is incorporated into the middle of the Freewinds ship logo, among several other Scientology symbols.

The OT levels are the upper part of "The Bridge to Total Freedom", which is Scientology's step by step spiritual progress chart. After having reached the level of "Clear" on the chart, Scientologists may then go on to the OT levels. Scientology founder L. Ron Hubbard describes OT as the "highest state there is". Operating Thetan is represented by a symbol consisting of the letters O and T, where the T is inside the O, and each of the points of the T end at the O's circumference.

An Operating Thetan (OT) is described within Scientology as a state of godliness, and Scientologists are taught they will have godlike control over "matter, energy, space and time" (known in Scientology jargon as MEST). Hubbard claimed that thetans were once all powerful beings that were tricked into following religions, which prevented them from using their own power to create and destroy universes. The Church claims that an Operating Thetan is not dependent on the physical universe, and Scientologists who have attained the highest OT level claim that they have control over their lives and can "exteriorize" from their bodies at will.

In the early days of Scientology, before OT levels were codified, Hubbard described the attainment of the concept of Operating Thetan as that of a "Cleared Theta Clear", which Hubbard describes as:

A thetan who is completely rehabilitated and can do everything a thetan should do, such as move MEST and control others from a distance, or create his own universe; a person who is able to create his own universe or, living in the MEST universe is able to create illusions perceivable by others at will, to handle MEST universe objects without mechanical means and to have and feel no need of bodies or even the MEST universe to keep himself and his friends interested in existence.

— L. Ron Hubbard, Scientology 8-8008, p. 114 (1st ed), p. 151 (1990 ed.)

According to religious scholar J. Gordon Melton, "[The OT levels are] basically a variation of the Gnostic myth about souls falling into matter and the encumbrances that come with that. ... In the OT [levels], you're finding out that you're a thetan, that you've come into bodies before. Part of what you're trying to learn is exteriorization — how to get out of your body. You also learn that you carry a lot of encumbrances from past lives."

While there are fifteen OT levels listed on Scientology's Classification, Gradation and Awareness Chart, the Church offers only the first eight. According to former Scientologist and critic of the Church Mike Rinder, the promise of new levels has been used for decades to motivate members to donate or repeat courses they have already taken in preparation. Rinder has said he doesn't believe these courses exist.

Conservative estimates from 2011 indicate that reaching and completing OT VIII would take many years, and require a minimum of payments to the Scientology organization of $300,000 to $400,000 (equivalent to $572,000 in 2025).

== Confidentiality ==
Since the 1960s when Hubbard invented the OT levels, they have been considered confidential. Those who read the writings do so in locked rooms, transport them in locked briefcases attached to their wrists, and the documents are securely locked up when not in actual use. Members are forbidden to discuss the OT levels with anyone, may not disclose the contents or procedures, and may not make copies or even notes. Mention of "body thetans" is forbidden. (Note: In summary, the practice of the OT levels is to remove "body thetans" which are "confused, disembodied souls who have attached themselves to us".)

One must be "invited" to do the OT levels. OT preps are preparatory steps to ensure that one is ready for them, and this includes security checks (confessionals) to make certain that the person is not a security risk and will keep the confidentiality of the OT materials.

Scientology has been active in litigating to keep their OT levels secret. During the 1980s Wollersheim case, the OT III materials were entered into evidence by Lawrence Wollersheim to show how they made him psychotic, eventually getting published in the news when an agency got their hands on a copy from the courthouse. In the 1990s Fishman case, materials from all the OT levels (I through VIII) were presented, eventually leading to others obtaining them and later posting them on the internet. This led to several raids of homes and offices, and lawsuits against several people who had put copies on the internet. Such acts collectively became known as Scientology versus the Internet.

On March 24, 2008, WikiLeaks published on its website the previously secret training instructions for the eight OT levels. Three days later the law firm of Moxon & Kobrin sent a letter to Wikileaks on behalf of the Church of Scientology demanding to have the documents removed. In response, Wikileaks stated they would not comply and would instead post even more Scientology documents. The Church of Scientology failed to get the documents removed from the website.

Hugh Urban explores reasons behind the secrecy in the OT levels within the Church by discussing its related controversies. He claims that secrecy is a motivating tool for Scientologists to desire to climb "The Bridge of Total Freedom", specifically to attain the level of OT VIII.

== OT levels ==
Although The Bridge to Total Freedom lists 15 OT levels above the state of Clear, only seven were released during Hubbard's lifetime, while OT VIII was released to the public in 1988, two years after Hubbard's 1986 death. The Church considers levels I through VII to be "pre-OT" levels, and level VIII to be the only true OT level. Most Scientologists omit the "pre-" and simply call them "OT levels".

Levels OT I through OT V can be delivered only at Church of Scientology Advanced Organizations. OT VI and OT VII can be delivered only at Flag Service Org. OT VIII can be delivered only at Flag Ship Service Org aboard Scientology's ship Freewinds.

=== OT I ===
According to the Church of Scientology, "This Solo-audited level is the first step a Clear takes toward full OT abilities, and that first step is a fresh causative OT viewpoint of the MEST universe and other beings." The cost to move to level OT I was $2,750 as of 2013.

=== OT II ===
According to the Church of Scientology, "By confronting hidden areas of one's existence on the whole track [that is, by confronting past incarnations], vast amounts of energy and attention are released. Those on this Solo-audited level experience a resurgence of self-determinism and native ability. OT II unlocks the aberrative factors on the whole track that have allowed the thetan to lose his innate freedom and ability and one achieves the ability to confront the whole track." The cost to move from OT I to OT II was $5,225 as of 2013.

=== OT III: Wall of Fire ===
Of all the levels, media attention has mostly focused on OT III, which tells Hubbard's version of the history of the universe from 75 million years ago. This level is called the "Wall of Fire" and claims to "reveal the cause of earthly human suffering". Hubbard claims that he himself had difficulty discovering it.

Hubbard announced his breakthrough less than a month after founding the Sea Org, a core group of Hubbard's most dedicated followers. He described it as a "means of erasing those mental factors that stand in the way of peace and toleration of mankind". The new material made up the new Operating Thetan III.

"This Solo-audited level goes through what is called the 'Wall of Fire' that surrounds a previously impenetrable whole track mystery. What prevents a being from being himself? This level answers that question. Once complete, a being is free of the whole track overwhelm that has trapped him. Here he confronts and eradicates the fourth dynamic engram that has plagued this universe for millennia." The cost to move from OT II to OT III was $8,910 as of 2013.

The Church positions OT III as a dangerous process which could lead to pneumonia, lack of sleep or even death if not undertaken correctly. In Church of Scientology of California v. Kaufman, it was noted that the defendant had been required to sign a waiver to the effect that "the Scientology Organization, its branches and members, and L. Ron Hubbard are not responsible for anything that might happen to my body or mind on OT III".

OT III contains material that the Church of Scientology regards as confidential. Access to the level is restricted, and members are required to receive an invitation and agree to confidentiality conditions before participating.

=== OT IV: OT Drug Rundown ===
According to the Church of Scientology, "this level handles the hidden problems and stops in a being's universe caused by the effects of drugs and poisons on the whole track. This is positioned as the final polish that rids one of any last vestige of the effects of drugs on the spirit. Ministered at Advanced Organizations or Flag. Approximately 12½ to 25 hours."

=== OT V: Audited NED for OTs (NOTs) ===
According to the Church of Scientology, "The Second Wall of Fire consists of 26 separate rundowns and has been described as dealing with 'living lightning, the very stuff of life itself.' This level addresses the last aspects of one's case that can prevent him from achieving total freedom on all dynamics. An audited level ministered at Advanced Organizations or Flag. Approximately 50 hours."

=== OT VI: Solo NOTs Auditing Course ===
According to the Church of Scientology, "The training one receives before starting to solo audit on New OT VII is so powerful that it actually constitutes an entire OT level. On Solo NOTs one is dealing with complexities intended to crush one's true power and abilities as a thetan. Solo NOTs auditors acquire a wide range of auditing skills to handle the vast phenomena that can occur on OT VIII. Approximately 3–4 weeks with the new Solo Auditor Course done."

=== OT VII: Solo NOTs ===
According to the Church of Scientology, "On New OT VII one solo audits at home daily. This is a lengthy level, requiring a considerable amount of time to complete. It is the final pre-OT level, and culminates in attainment of the state of CAUSE OVER LIFE."

=== OT VIII: Truth Revealed ===
Many who had spent decades and hundreds of thousands of dollars to reach the pinnacle of the scientology Bridge were so disgusted when they finally got there that it was the last thing they did in scientology. — Mike Rinder

OT VIII is the highest level in Scientology, and is only offered aboard the Freewinds ship. It reveals "the ultimate secret of Hubbard's teachings".

According to the Church of Scientology, "This Solo-audited level addresses the primary cause of amnesia on the whole track and lets one see the truth of his own existence. This is the first actual OT level and brings about a resurgence of power and native abilities for the being himself. This may be done at the Flag Ship Service Organization."

According to interviews performed by Mike Rinder, Scientologists have described OT VIII as "less than overwhelming".

The original version of the OT VIII confidential document was written by Hubbard in 1980 and released in 1988, two years after his death in 1986. Early participants in OT VIII balked at its content, and the Church released a revised version in 1991. The original document was exposed in 1993 by being included in the Fishman Affidavit as part of a court case. Initially the Church claimed copyright ownership of all documents found in the Fishman Affidavit, but later asserted that this particular document was a forgery. The revised version has an editor's note that states "it is not the original". The original document contains a doomsday prophecy that the Marcab Confederacy would return soon and telepathically enslave "a good portion of this universe", and that Hubbard would return after his own death in a Messiah-like manner to "halt a series of events designed to make happy slaves of us all".

=== OT IX to OT XV ===
Since 1986, Church of Scientology leader David Miscavige has dangled the hope of OT IX and X being released in the near future, pending certain conditions, which have shifted over time. It has been widely reported that Hubbard never wrote OT IX and above; therefore, those levels do not exist.

== Criticism and legal issues ==
A growing number of former Scientologists have made public allegations that the Church encourages its members to complete very expensive courses and expect wonderful results; when the improvements fail to happen, further courses are then promoted to facilitate the anticipated changes. Criticism stems from a pattern of cycles wherein members continue to pay increasing amounts for these courses, while some even put their families into debt chasing elusive life-changing results under the stewardship of the Church.

In March 2008, WikiLeaks published leaked documents from the Church's OT level documents. The Church of Scientology portrayed hosting the documentation as a copyright violation implying that the collection is Church doctrine. Written demands from the Church were ignored by Wikileaks and, in an unrelated legal case, a "U.S. federal judge ruled that efforts to shut down [Wikileaks] violated constitutional rights to free speech".

In 1997, Zenon Panoussis, a resident of Sweden, sent copies of NOTs documents to various government authorities, thereby making the documents public according to the Swedish principle of public access to official records. The Church of Scientology responded by ordering members to continuously borrow the available copies in order to prevent non-members from reading them. The Church of Scientology also sued Panoussis for copyright infringement, since he had made the documents available online without authorization.

A similar incident occurred during the 1980s, during the trial of Wollersheim v. Church of Scientology. When the OT III documents had been entered into evidence, 1,500 Scientologists crammed the courthouse in an attempt to block public access to the documents by each requesting to photocopy them, thus overwhelming the clerk's office so no one else could access them.

== See also ==
- Space opera in Scientology
- Body thetan
