= Space opera in Scientology =

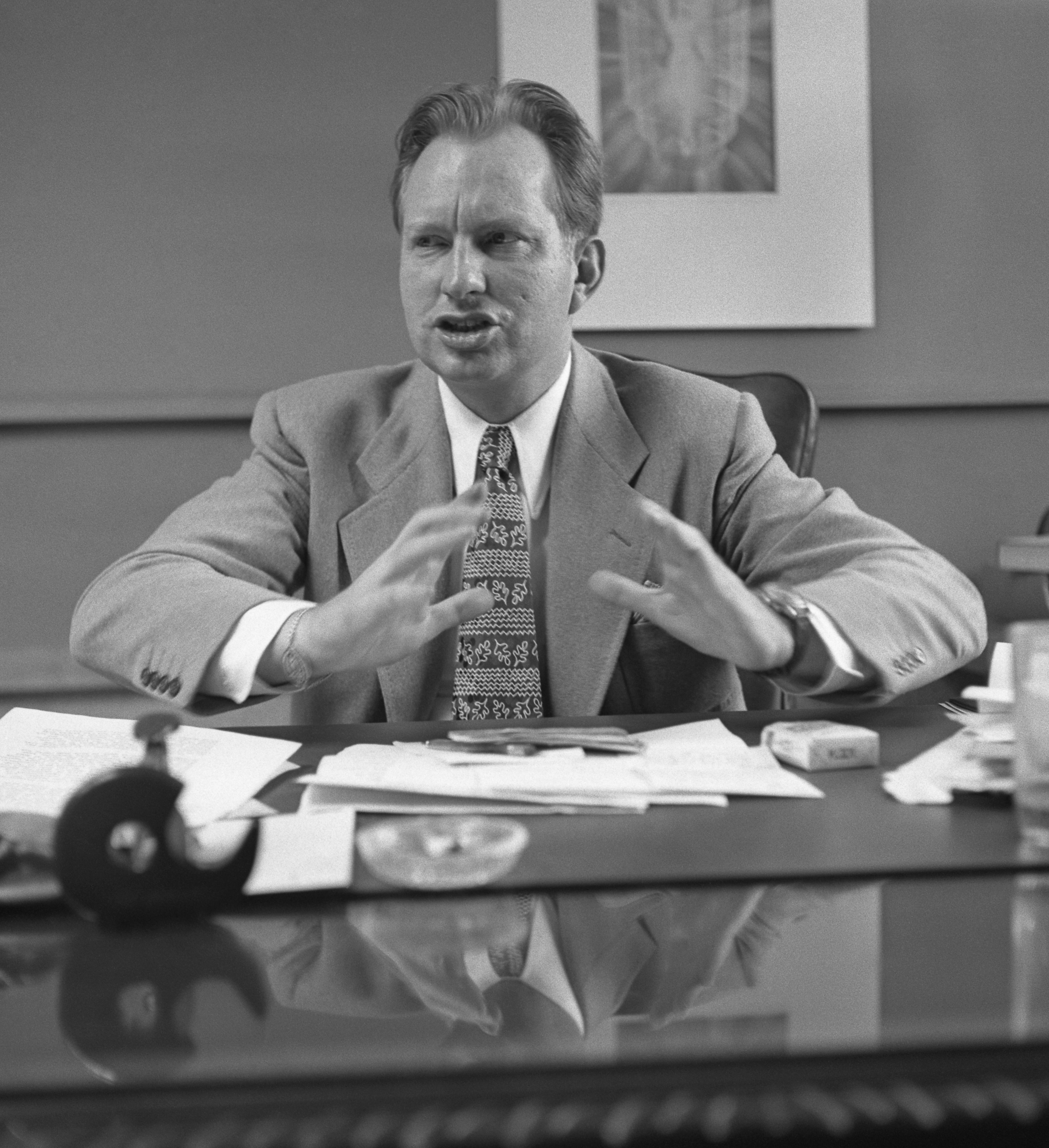
L. Ron Hubbard in 1950, around when he developed Scientology

Scientology founder L. Ron Hubbard routinely referred to "space opera" in his teachings, drawing from science-fiction and weaving it into his origins of human history. In his writings, wherein thetans (roughly comparable to the concept of a human soul) were reincarnated periodically over quadrillions of years, retaining memories of prior lives, to which Hubbard attributed complex narratives about life throughout the universe. The most controversial of these myths is the story of Xenu, to whom Hubbard attributed responsibility for many of the world's problems.

Some space opera doctrines of Scientology are only provided by the Church of Scientology to experienced members, who church leaders maintain are the only ones able to correctly understand them. Several former members of the Church (Note: Use of "Church" or "the Church" is a common shortened form of "Church of Scientology"; see The Church (Scientology).) have exposed these secret documents, leading to lengthy court battles with the Church, which failed to keep the secret. Critics of the Church have noted that some of the narratives are scientifically impossible, and have thus assailed the Church as untrustworthy for teaching them. The space opera teachings have also been satirized in popular culture. Scholars of religion have described the space opera narratives as a creation myth designed to encourage reverence of Hubbard as a supreme messenger. Several academics have drawn attention to the similarity of the space opera myths to themes of the 1950s Cold War culture in which they were constructed.

== Origins ==
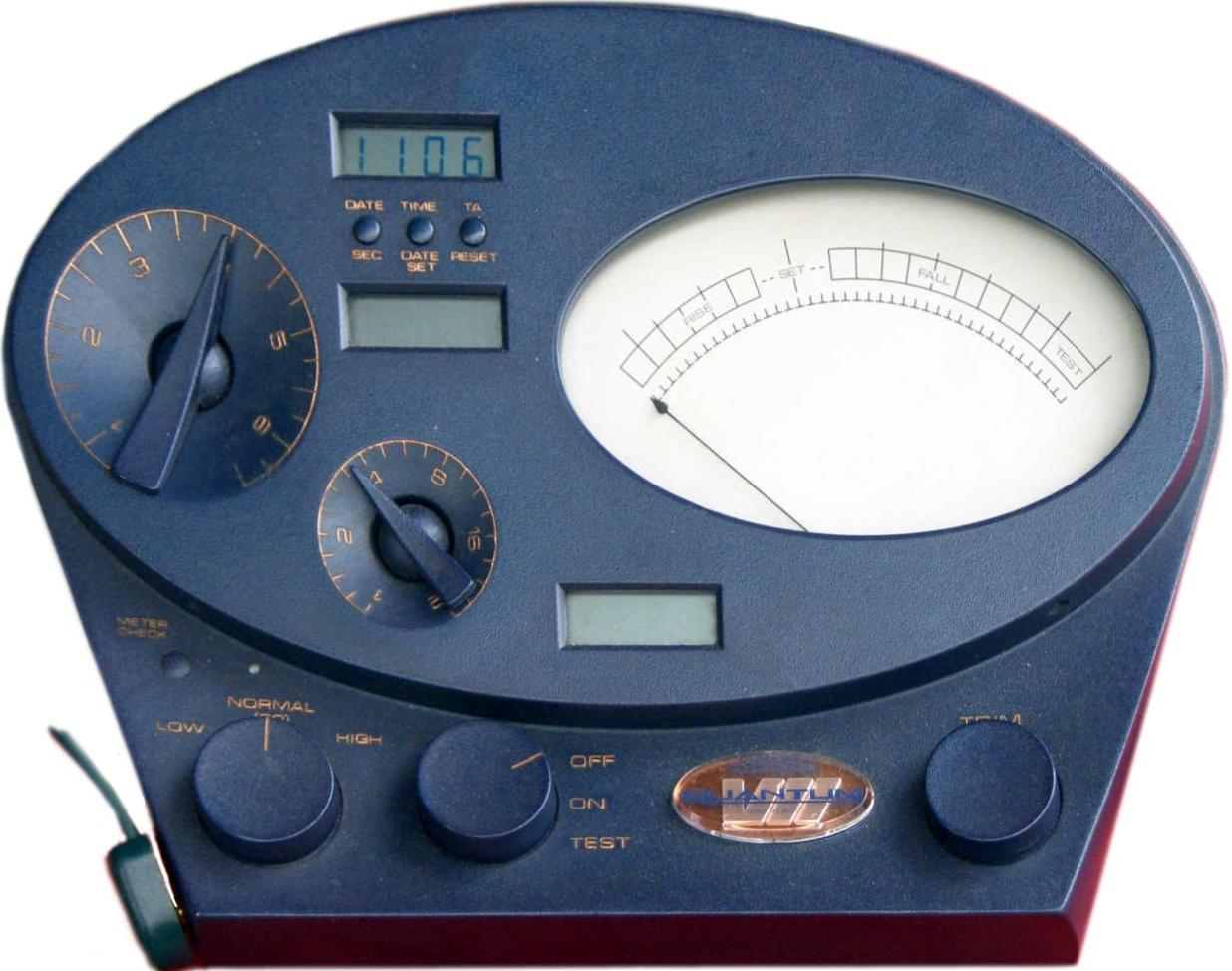
A Scientology e-meter, a device for displaying and/or recording the electrodermal activity (EDA) of a human being. The device is used frequently for auditing in Scientology.

(Although this article regularly refers to Xenu, Hubbard in some of his lectures and writings actually uses the name Xemu and even spells it out).

L. Ron Hubbard created a set of beliefs that he represented as a form of therapy, which he named Dianetics. He promoted it as a scientific, not religious, teaching. The system has no scientific basis and is a type of pseudoscience. Until the early 1950s, Hubbard had a negative view of organized religions, but thereafter discussed spiritual topics. In these teachings, he claimed to identify subconscious memories of past events, which he called "engrams", as causes of human dissatisfaction. By 1950, he had begun to ponder past lives, believing that they could be recalled; he attempted to use these recollections to develop a comprehensive narrative of the universe. He founded the Church of Scientology in 1953, advancing his beliefs as religious doctrines. The Church was distinct from Dianetics-based groups but incorporated some of their views. Hubbard saw Dianetics as focused on the physical body but viewed Scientology as a way to address spiritual matters.

In Hubbard's efforts to shift from a psychotherapeutic to a spiritual program, he introduced the concept of thetans: a set of godlike, non-corporeal entities capable of creating and shaping universes, later trapped in the MEST universe and confined, by reincarnation, to physical bodies. Hugh Urban of Ohio State University states that these teachings bear similarities to Gnosticism, although he doubts that Hubbard was well versed in Gnostic thought.

In the 1950s, as Hubbard's followers recalled their past lives, he recorded many details of these recollections. With this as his source, he constructed an intricate history of the universe, identified as "space opera". Although Hubbard believed that he had developed a comprehensive history, Urban cites the isolated and incomplete record of the statements, wherein Hubbard identified a thetan universe, separate from the material universe, created by its inhabitants. The material universe, in Hubbard's view, began when other universes created by thetans collided, from which they entered the material universe in six invasion groups roughly 60 trillion years ago. Hubbard also described a series of events, called the "incidents", which divorced the thetans from their self-knowledge, but maintained that thetans could regain their former divinity, and referred to thetans that freed themselves from the material world as "operating thetans".

== Narratives and civilizations ==
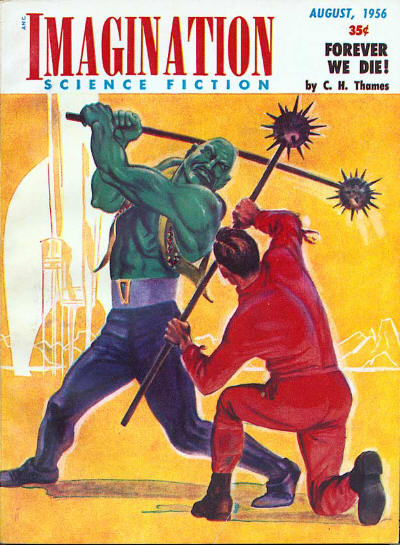
Cover of Imagination August 1956 depicting a space opera story

Hubbard located his first 'incident' four quadrillion years ago, in which a thetan encountered 'loud cracks and brightness' and then observed a cherub and chariot before experiencing total darkness. In Scientology, this is known as "Incident 1". Another important event in Scientology's chronology of the universe occurred on a space city known as Arslycus, the inhabitants of whom brought about an incident when capturing thetans.

The most controversial portion of Scientology's space opera is the Xenu myth, known as "Incident 2", in which Hubbard described a group of 76 planets, orbiting stars visible from Earth, organized in a Galactic Confederacy c. 75 million years ago, ruled by the dictator Xenu. The confederacy having become overpopulated, Xenu sent several billion of his citizens onto DC 8 planes to the planet Teegeeack (Earth), ostensibly for tax audition. There, hydrogen bombs were detonated inside volcanoes, killing the exiles, whose thetans were brainwashed on Hawaii and the Canary Islands, (Note: Former scientologist Mark Rathbun discussed an account of the origin of psychiatrists that he says was passed from Hubbard to David Miscavige. The account casts psychiatrists as originating on the planet Farsec and being sent to Earth to control its population. There they took the form of priests and shamans before becoming psychiatrists. (Rathbun 2013, p. 238)) introducing various myths, such as the myth of Jesus, to conceal the thetans' origins. Eventually, officers of the Galactic Confederacy launched a rebellion against Xenu, which continued for six years before capturing him and placing him in an electrified prison in the center of a mountain. Hubbard taught that the thetans brainwashed by Xenu's forces remained on Earth, where the "body thetans", attached to human psyches, contribute to human problems, and that individuals could be freed from these brainwashed thetans and thus attain a type of salvation.

Hubbard also taught that, upon the deaths of humans, thetans continued to "implant stations", including locations on planets near Earth, where their memories were erased, and new memories emplaced. On the grounds that some "implant stations" were better than others, Hubbard advised his followers to avoid the one on Venus. After passing an implant station, he taught, the thetan returned to Earth, where it was incarnated. Hubbard taught the Christian concept of heaven was based on a physical location on another planet, which he claimed to have visited. He compared its appearance to Busch Gardens in Pasadena, California (the actual gardens, which closed in 1937 and inspired the name of the later chain of theme parks), and noted it contained effigies of characters from the New Testament. Over time, he recalled, the location fell into disrepair. A town nearby contained an implant station, to which thetans were convinced to return.

Another significant encounter in Hubbard's narrative occurred when a large group of planets formed the Marcab Confederacy, described as in search of slaves, and called a "decadent" society. The author related that this civilization caused a significant implant upon their encounter with thetans.

Hubbard discussed the history of human civilizations on Earth and the lives of ancient sea monsters and fish people as well. He also said humans could recover memories of previous lives, such as the experiences of clams and Neanderthals. In his mythos, Atlantis was a completely electronic civilization, whose inhabitants possessed disintegration technology; in contrast, Earth was invaded by multiple groups around 1200 BCE, including the "fifth invader force from Martian Command" against the "fourth invasion force from Space Command" in battle.

On the premise that thetans are forced to believe various faulty ideas, the Church teaches that their courses allow "theta beings" to be freed from these beliefs and regain their former abilities. Committed Scientologists pursue courses and procedures offered by the Church in the hope of gaining freedom and enlightenment, allegedly permitting travel around the Solar System. The author referred to the process of a thetan leaving its human body as "exteriorization", which he said allowed for space travel. Urban notes that this is similar to Aleister Crowley's teachings of astral projection, although he adds that Hubbard did not use that term.

== Space opera and Scientologists ==
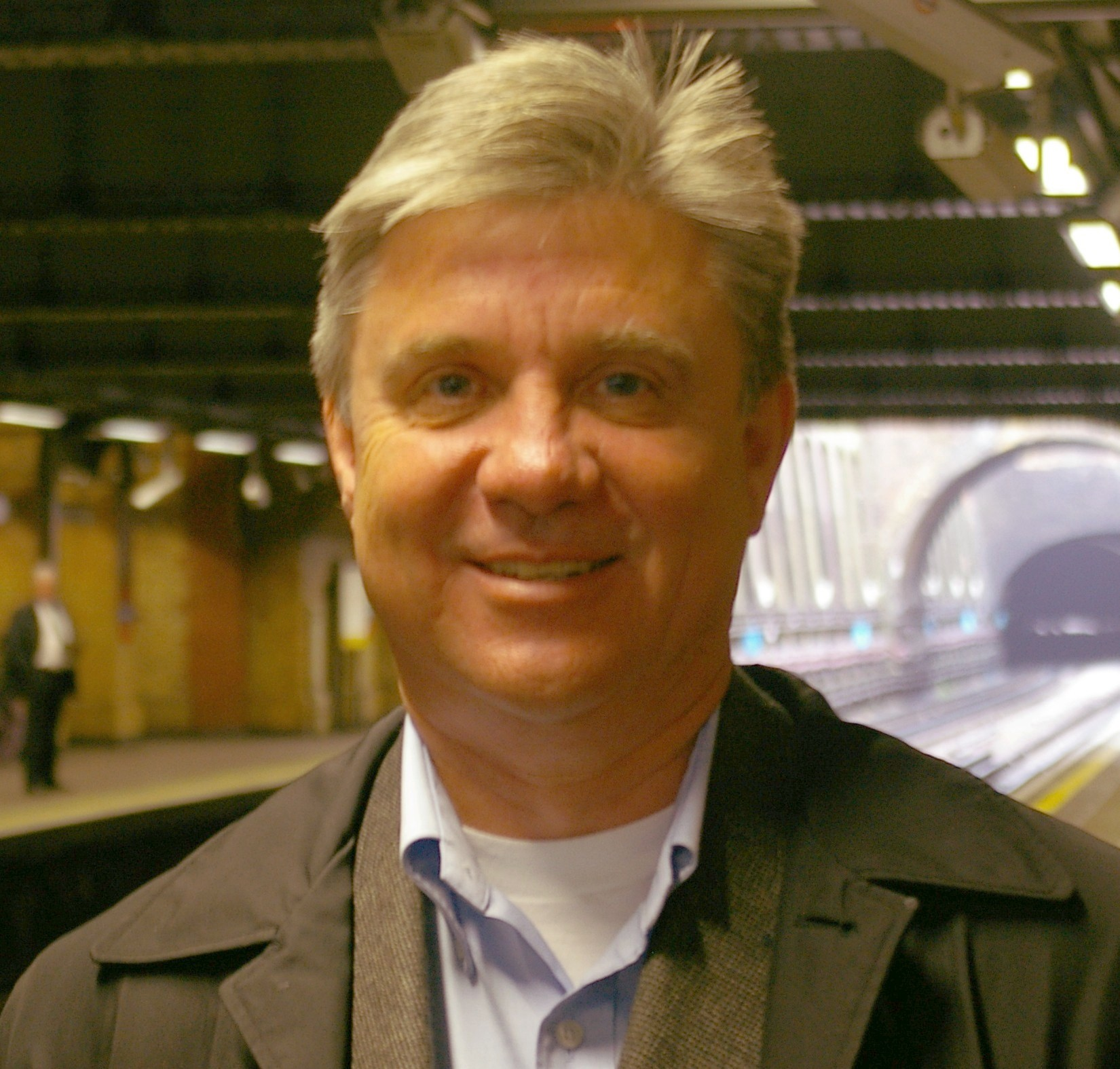
Mike Rinder, a former spokesman of the Church of Scientology, stated that extraterrestrial auditing is merely "a small percent" of Scientology's teachings.

A glossary on the Scientology website defined the term "space opera" as a description of actual events:

"Space opera has space travel, spaceships, spacemen, intergalactic travel, wars, conflicts, other beings, civilizations and societies, and other planets and galaxies. It is not fiction and concerns actual incidents."

The 1958 Scientology publication Have You Lived Before This Life contains some space opera, describing past lives—including some on warlike planets—which were recalled through auditing. In the 1960s, Hubbard introduced a series of questions, known as "security checks", to verify members' loyalty. Mikael Rothstein, associate professor of religious history at the University of Copenhagen, sees the Xenu myth as building on, and the culmination of, these accounts. The Xenu myth was released to Scientologists in the late 1960s, after teachings about thetans and their relationship to the physical body had been disseminated; its release provided the cause and origin of many of the group's teachings. Rothstein describes "space opera" as "Hubbard's introduction of a new reality, and new foundation for everything".

In a 1968 lecture, Hubbard acknowledged similarities between his teachings and the space opera. Said Hubbard: "This planet is part of an earlier federation and passed out of its control due to losses in war and other such things. Now, this larger confederacy, this isn’t its right name, but we have often called it and referred to it in the past as the Marcab Confederacy. And it has been wrongly or rightly pointed to as one of the tail stars of the Big Dipper, which is the capital planet of which this planet is. Now, all this sounds very Space Opera-ish and that sort of thing, and I’m sorry for it, but I am not one to quibble about the truth. "

Although Hubbard spoke openly about space opera in the 1950s, Scientology eventually became an esoteric faith: some teachings are withheld until followers reach a certain point in their spiritual development, and the mythological foundation of the courses are unknown to many members. Over a decade of auditing and study—and donations of tens of thousands of dollars—are required for a member to reach the highest echelons of hidden knowledge. Followers below a certain level (OT III) of growth are denied access to the Church's cosmological teachings, and they are given different explanations for the Church's teachings. German scholar Gerald Willms notes that in addition to the esoteric foundations, Scientology cites practical justifications for its rituals, so they can be pursued without knowledge of advanced teachings. The Church of Scientology has attempted to prevent the public release of their esoteric teachings, but, through the internet, their confidential aspects have been widely released. The Church considers public discussion of their space opera teachings offensive and has asked academics not to publish their details. Scientologists maintain that the true meaning of these texts is only accessible to those who have progressed through their courses, and that those who read them prematurely risk damage to their spiritual and physical conditions. Church leaders have sometimes outright refused to discuss the subject with journalists. Rothstein observes that the Church also has a strong financial motivation to keep members from accessing higher-level courses, as devotees are required to make large payments to obtain them. Free Zone Scientologists, however, are sometimes more open about space opera. Some Free Zone Scientologists believe that the Church of Scientology has been hijacked by undercover agents of the Marcab Confederacy.

During auditing, Scientology members sometimes recall details of life in space. Rothstein states that this is part of a "mythological paradigm" that members initially partake of through Scientology's scriptures. He notes, however, that some Scientologists do not believe that there are space opera myths in the group's teachings, and that others have left the group after learning about the higher-level doctrines. Reitman relates that some members accept the space opera teachings by seeing them as similar to seemingly implausible stories of popular religions or simply remain quiet about their doubts.

Rothstein states that space opera is a "part of the total fabric of Scientological thinking and narrative, but not of prime importance." He argues that these teachings are a "second order belief", in that they exist to support the group's core teachings about thetans. Mike Rinder, a former spokesman of the Church of Scientology, stated that extraterrestrial auditing is merely "a small percent" of their canon.

== Criticism and leaking ==
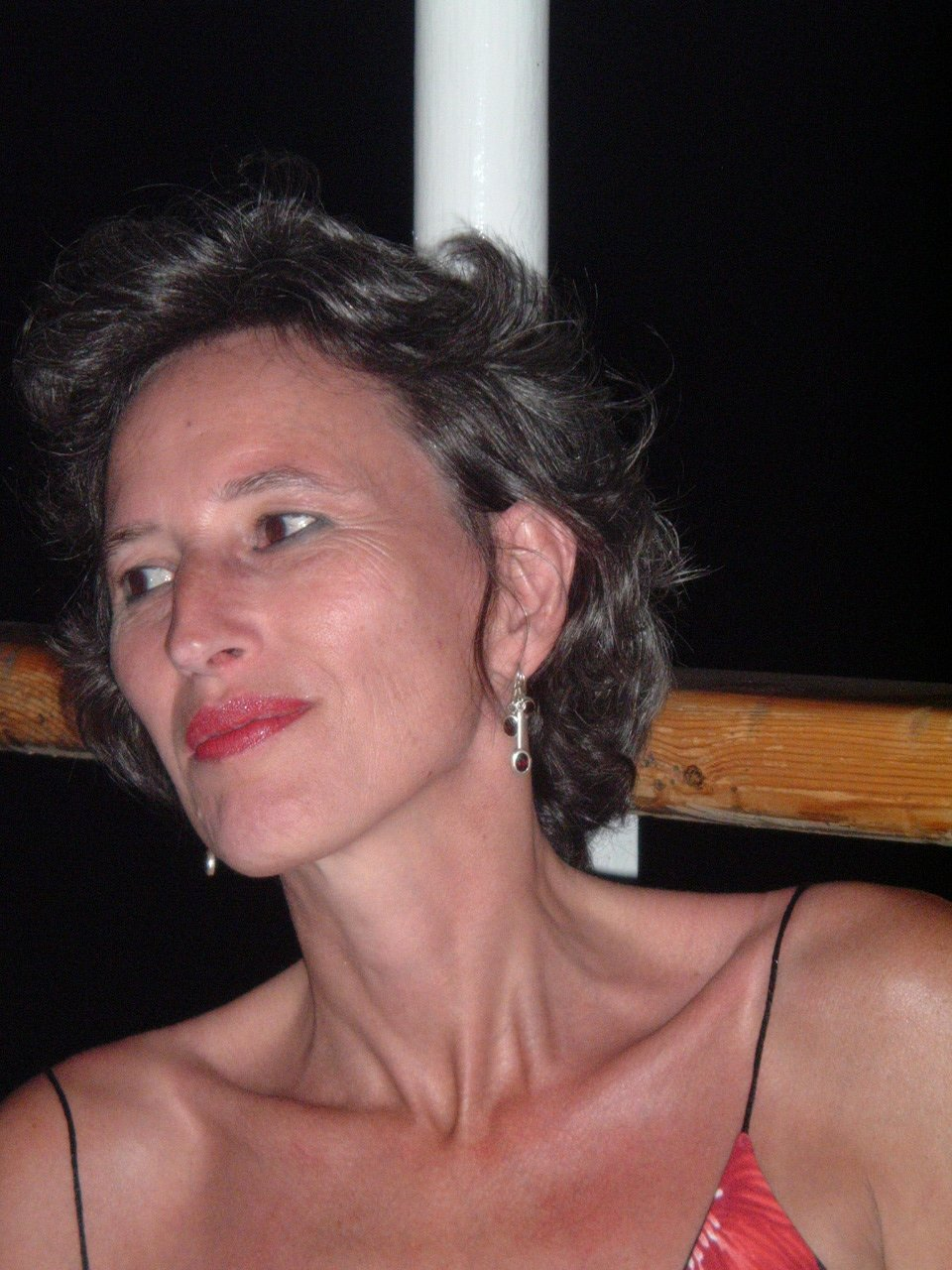
Karin Spaink, a Dutch journalist who helped publicize confidential Scientology doctrines

Scientology's space opera teachings were publicized in accounts given by former church members, most notably during court cases. One such case was filed by a former Scientologist, Larry Wollersheim, against the Church in 1980. Five years later, Wollersheim offered confidential Scientology materials, including space opera teachings, to the court as evidence, a move that was vigorously protested by the Church's attorneys. They were unable to prevent disclosure, however, and the documents were published by the Los Angeles Times in November 1985. This was the first time that some aspects of Scientology's space opera teachings were offered as public evidence about the Church. In the mid-1990s, Wollersheim published some of the materials on a website, prompting the Church to sue his organization, FACTNet. The Church attested that the space opera narratives were trade secrets; this claim was rejected by the court.

In 1990, after being sued for libel by the Church of Scientology, Steven Fishman, a former member turned critic, offered a large amount of the group's highly confidential teachings in court. The documents, contained in what is known as the Fishman Affidavit, included detailed accounts of the Church's space opera narratives. This material was subsequently posted on alt.religion.scientology and a website of Dutch journalist Karin Spaink. The Church filed suits against those who posted the documents, claiming copyright violations. Lengthy court battles ensued, but the Church was unable to prevent the materials' dissemination over the internet.

Former Scientologists and members of the anti-cult movement often discuss Scientology's space opera teachings. They generally take a rationalistic approach to the narratives and see them as absurd, or even as drug-fueled delusions, using them as a source of humor. The doctrines have been satirized in popular culture, most notably in the South Park episode "Trapped in the Closet". The anti-Scientology website Operation Clambake prominently uses space opera doctrines in their criticisms of the Church, casting the implausibility of the stories as a clear reason to reject the group. Anti-cult critics of Scientology argue that the content of these teachings demonstrates that Scientology misleads its followers; many aspects of the narratives, such as the age of the volcanoes that Xenu is said to have used, contradict scientific consensus. The space opera teachings are, in fact, incompatible with scientific consensus on the age of the universe: around 14 billion years. Rothstein notes that scholars of religion usually do not pursue this line of analysis because all myths contain unscientific content; he notes that cultural conditioning determines whether religious narratives appear reasonable.

== Analysis ==
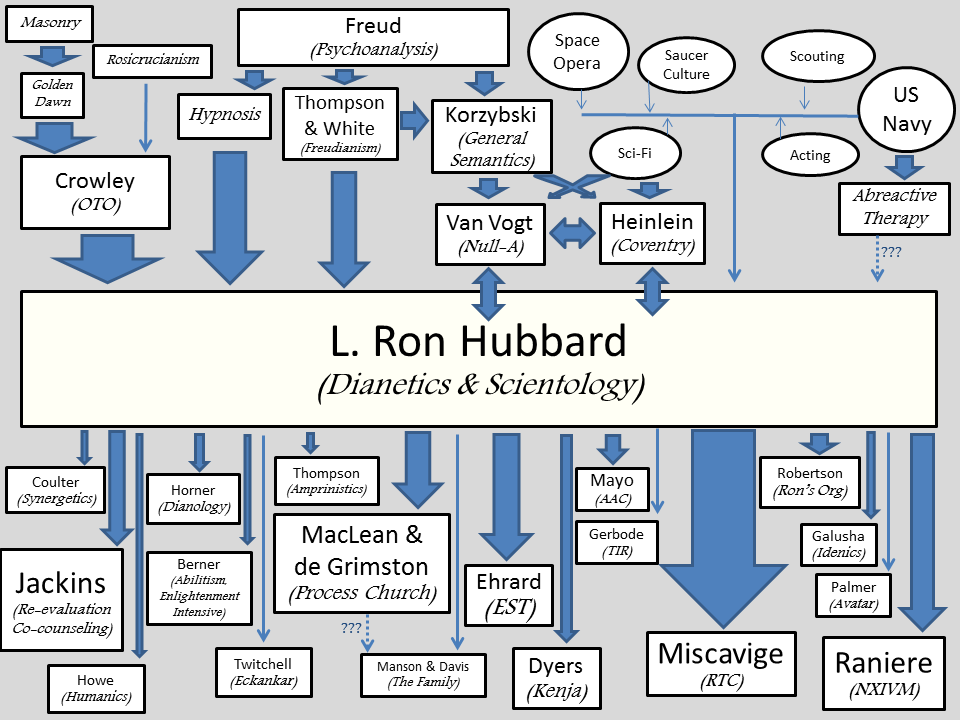
Hubbard's beliefs and practices, drawn from a diverse set of sources, influenced numerous offshoots, splinter groups, and new movements.

According to Susan Raine, Hubbard's concept of "space opera" significantly diverges from traditional definitions by asserting that it is not a fictional genre but rather a factual account of human history. Although an official Scientology dictionary defines space opera as a sub-genre of science fiction, Hubbard's writings and lectures from the early 1950s present it as a genuine reflection of human events spanning millions of years across galaxies. He characterizes space opera as encompassing elements like space travel, intergalactic conflicts, and various civilizations, claiming these are actual occurrences rather than mere fiction. This redefinition illustrates how Hubbard intertwined his passion for science fiction with his views on human behavior, presenting a unique perspective on human history as shaped by these grand narratives. The concept of "the whole track" in Scientology serves as a framework for understanding this expansive history. The fluid nature of the term "space opera" reflects its evolving interpretations within both literary and religious contexts.

Rothstein argues that in the construction of the space opera narratives, Hubbard drew from tropes common to his audience. The concept of a Galactic Confederation, Rothstein observes, was present in other UFO religions of the 1950s;

- In contrast to the overpopulation and atomic bombs were often discussed therein. Urban cites UFO encounters and alien invasions as popular themes during the Cold War;
- Rothstein draws parallels between Hubbard's teachings and the beliefs of UFO religions, citing similarities between thetans trapped in human bodies and the walk-in hypothesis of the Ashtar Command. Andreas Grünschloß notes Scientology's space opera teachings place them in the tradition of the ancient astronaut hypothesis; he states the group's teachings about thetans bears similarities to "star seeds" found in UFO religions.

Grünschloß speculates the UFO-contact narratives may have played a role in the group's development of space opera, specifically citing the resemblance of Hubbard's description of life in Xenu's time to statements by George Adamski, a UFO contactee of the 1950s. Rothstein notes the group's teachings about extraterrestrials varies greatly from most of the UFO movement, particularly in Hubbard's descriptions of demonic characters.

Hubbard was a science fiction writer before starting Scientology, and some aspects of the Church's space opera bear similarities to his previous writings. Noting similarities between Hubbard's fiction writing and creation of religious myths, Rothstein argues; "perhaps no division between such categories should be made". Kent posits some of his cosmology, such as the priests and psychiatrists loyal to Xenu, were modeled after events in Hubbard's life, such as his distaste for Christianity and clashes with the psychiatric establishment. Hubbard theorized science fiction writers sometimes recalled portions of events from past lives and incorporated it into their works, and Urban writes Hubbard's science fiction writings "contain more than a few seeds of Hubbard's religious movement, the Church of Scientology".

Rothstein argues Scientology's space opera identify Xenu as the root of evil and Hubbard as the hero, for having uncovered the mysteries of the universe. Rothstein states the group's teachings about "salvation" may be a means to encourage reverence of Hubbard. In addition, Rothstein notes the space opera teachings also provide fundamental justifications for some practical aspects of Scientology, including the rejection of psychiatry and the formation of the Sea Org. He sees space opera as similar to most types of mythology, involving superhuman beings in the far distant past. Willms states the mythology of Scientology differs from many other religions because it focuses on material beings; but argues the Xenu myth is a religious narrative, although the Church of Scientology has never used this claim in their efforts to be recognized as a religion.

== See also ==
- Science fiction
- List of space opera media
