= MEST (Scientology) =

Scientology term for physical universe

MEST is a Scientology term for the physical universe, derived from the acronym for matter, energy, space, and time, and pronounced as a word. It was coined by L. Ron Hubbard in 1950, and is a key concept in Scientology. MEST contrasts with the spiritual realm of thetans, who are believed to have created the physical universe (the MEST universe) and later became trapped within it. Scientology uses related terms such as ENMEST, meaning disordered or degraded physical conditions, and MEST work, referring to manual labor. Scientology auditing techniques are intended to free thetans from the limitations of MEST and restore their native spiritual abilities.

== MEST ==
MEST is used to refer to the physical universe (as opposed to a spiritual universe) . Property and possessions including cars, houses, clothes, jewelry, and other physical or material goods are MEST. In the Sea Org, MEST is considered relatively unimportant.

By the end of 1950 in a series of lectures in California, Hubbard introduced a distinction that formed the basis of further theoretical change, between 'MEST' and 'theta'. MEST (Matter, Energy, Space, Time) was Hubbard's acronym for the material or physical universe, while theta stood for the universe of thought.

— Roy Wallis

== MEST body ==
MEST body means the physical body; the human body.

The body is, after all, composed of mest. It follows the laws of mest. One of these laws is Newton's first law of motion: inertia. This is the tendency of a mest object to remain motionless until acted upon by an exterior force. Or to continue in a line of motion until acted upon by an exterior force. Well, the main force around that is continually acting on a human body is a thetan, the being himself. The body will remain at rest (since it is a mest object) until acted upon by the thetan that is supposed to be running it.

— L. Ron Hubbard

== MEST universe and the Theta-MEST theory ==
The MEST universe is considered to be the physical universe as opposed to the native thought-universe of thetans, and was created by thetans. In 1986, David Miscavige's public announcement to Scientologists referred to L. Ron Hubbard's death as leaving the MEST universe: "L. Ron Hubbard discarded the body he had used in this lifetime for seventy-four years, ten months, and eleven days. The body he had used to facilitate his existence in this MEST universe had ceased to be useful and in fact had become an impediment to the work he now must do outside of its confines."

In the Theta-MEST theory, the native thetan, being bored, decided to create a physical universe, then pretended to forget it was playing in a MEST universe; then, it actually did forget, and became part of the MEST universe. Per Wallis, "Thetans are by now in a hypnoid state, having forgotten their quadrillions of years of existence and their original godly power, barely capable of even leaving their bodies at will."

Lawrence Wright describes Hubbard's version of the Big Bang event:

Incident One was a kind of Garden of Eden fall from grace that occurred four quadrillion years ago, which is when Hubbard dates the origin of the universe. Before Incident One, thetans were in a pure, godlike state. Suddenly, there was a loud snap and a flood of light. A chariot appeared, trailed by a trumpeting cherub; then darkness. This incident marked the moment when thetans became separated from their original static condition and created the physical universe of matter, energy, space, and time (MEST). In the process, they lost awareness of their immortality.

— Lawrence Wright

== ENMEST ==
ENMEST is a compound word meaning "enturbulated MEST". To enturbulate means "to cause to become turbulent, agitated and disturbed." ENMEST is "property, energy, or space which has been rendered less useful by poor thinking. Time which is wasted. ... [for example], a rotten canvas, broken chairs, things which don't belong in the area, rubbish, etc." An individual who is low on Scientology's emotional tone scale will make ENMEST out of any MEST, "will prefer sordid and squalid quarters, will drive ancient and rickety cars, will dress only in the most ragged clothes." With respect to Scientology auditing, ENMEST is a nonphysical/thought component of an engram, and it is desirable to remove it through auditing.

== Goal of auditing ==
The aim of Scientology auditing processes is to free a person from the limitations of MEST and to return them to their native "godlike" state and be 'at cause' over their body, environment and past lives.

The ultimate goal of auditing is not just to liberate a person from destructive mental phenomena; it is to emancipate him from the laws of matter, energy, space, and time — or MEST, as Hubbard termed them. These are just artifacts of the thetan's imagination, in any case. Bored thetans had created MEST universes where they could frolic and play games; eventually, they became so absorbed in their distractions they forgot their true immortal natures.

— Lawrence Wright

=== MEST clear ===
According to Wallis, a MEST Clear is a person at 4.0 on the emotional tone scale, who would be near accident proof, without any psycho-somatic ills, nearly immune to bacteria, and would have a high courage level.

== MEST work ==
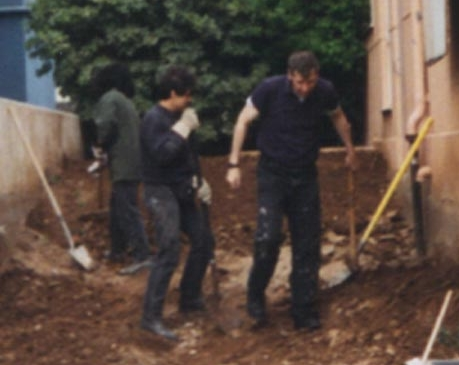
Sea Org members on the RPF doing MEST work

MEST work means manual labor, physical labor, and hard labor. The term has been used to indicate both a therapy and a punishment. To be "put on MEST work" is to be assigned to do manual labor. In the Sea Org, one is expected to be able to confront all kinds of MEST work. Some positions in the Sea Org are specifically MEST work oriented, such as in an Estates Division which would manage the hotel functions, or a janitor. MEST work projects, on the other hand, are mostly renovation, demolition, and construction.

More often than not, a Sea Org member is assigned to MEST work as a punishment, and children (young Sea Org members) are not exempt from such assignments. There have been many work units explicitly run as MEST work units or with a large component being MEST work — and assignment to such units has routinely been given as a punishment. These include the Estates Project Force (EPF), Deck Project Force (DPF), Rehabilitation Unit, Rehabilitation Project Force (RPF), the Heavy MEST Work Unit, and the Mud Box Brigade.

I didn't actually consider the dirty work itself to be degrading; in fact, Hubbard wrote that MEST work (physical rather than mental labor) helped "extrovert" a person who had gotten too "into his head" and thus was not performing well, which is why manual labor was done on the RPF.The work was not really the point. It was the humiliation of being sent to do the lowest grunt duties in front of all the Freewinds crew. This was the reason for many of Miscavige's random punishments—to ensure everyone understood their status was very impermanent and he could remove it with the snap of his fingers.

— Mike Rinder

== Personifying MEST ==
Hubbard felt that African Americans had a tendency to personify the MEST universe by giving objects personalities: "Actually, have you ever noticed how a negro, in particular, down south, where they're pretty close to the soil, personifies MEST? The gate post and the wagon and the whip and anything around there. A hat – they talk to 'em, you know. 'Wassa madda wit you, hat?' They imbue them, with personality."

In Scientology: The Fundamentals of Thought, Hubbard claims:

"Unlike yellow and brown people, the white does not usually believe he can get attention from matter or objects. The yellow and brown believe for the most part (and it is all a matter of consideration) that rocks, trees, walls etc., can give them attention. The white man seldom believes this and so is likely to become anxious about people. Thus the white saves people, prevents famine, flood, disease and revolution for people as the only purveyors of attention are scarce. The white goes further. He often believes he can get attention only from whites and that yellow and brown peoples' attention is worthless. Thus the yellow and brown races are not very progressive, but, by and large, saner. And the white race is progressive but more frantic. The yellow and brown races do not understand white concern for "bad conditions" since what is a few million dead men? There are plenty of identities and there is plenty of attention, they think. The white can't understand them. Nor can they understand the white."

— L. Ron Hubbard
