= Xenu =

Figure in Scientology space opera

Xenu (/ˈziːnuː/ ZEE-noo), also called Xemu, is a figure in the Church of Scientology's confidential upper-level teachings, where he appears in material known as Operating Thetan level III (OT III). The Xenu narrative forms part of their space opera teachings about ancient extraterrestrial civilizations, catastrophic events in the distant past, and their continuing effects on the spiritual condition of humanity. These materials are treated as trade secrets and are normally disclosed only to Scientologists who have completed extensive preparatory coursework.

According to the OT III account, Xenu was an extraterrestrial ruler of a Galactic Confederacy who, tens of millions of years ago, transported billions of beings to Earth (then called Teegeeack), placed them around volcanoes, and killed them with hydrogen bombs. The disembodied spirits of the victims, called thetans, are said to have become attached to surviving bodies as "body thetans", contributing to spiritual and psychological difficulties in the present day. Scientology teaches that these entities can be identified and released through specialized procedures at the upper Operating Thetan levels.

The Church of Scientology regards the OT III material as confidential, and instructs members not to reveal or discuss it with those who have not reached the appropriate level. Church officials have often declined to address the Xenu topic in public or have minimized its relevance, while maintaining that the material can only be properly understood in the context of the full Scientology training path. Despite these restrictions, the Xenu narrative has become widely known through court cases, leaks of internal documents, and reporting by journalists and former members, and it has played a significant role in controversies over Scientology's use of copyright and trade-secret law.

Since its disclosure, the Xenu story has attracted sustained attention from scholars, critics, and the media. Academic writers have examined it as a central myth within Scientology, relating it to science-fiction motifs, UFO religions, modern creation narratives, and cosmologies. The story has also been frequently referenced and satirized in television, film, and other media, where it has become one of the most widely recognized elements of Scientology's upper-level teachings.

== Summary ==
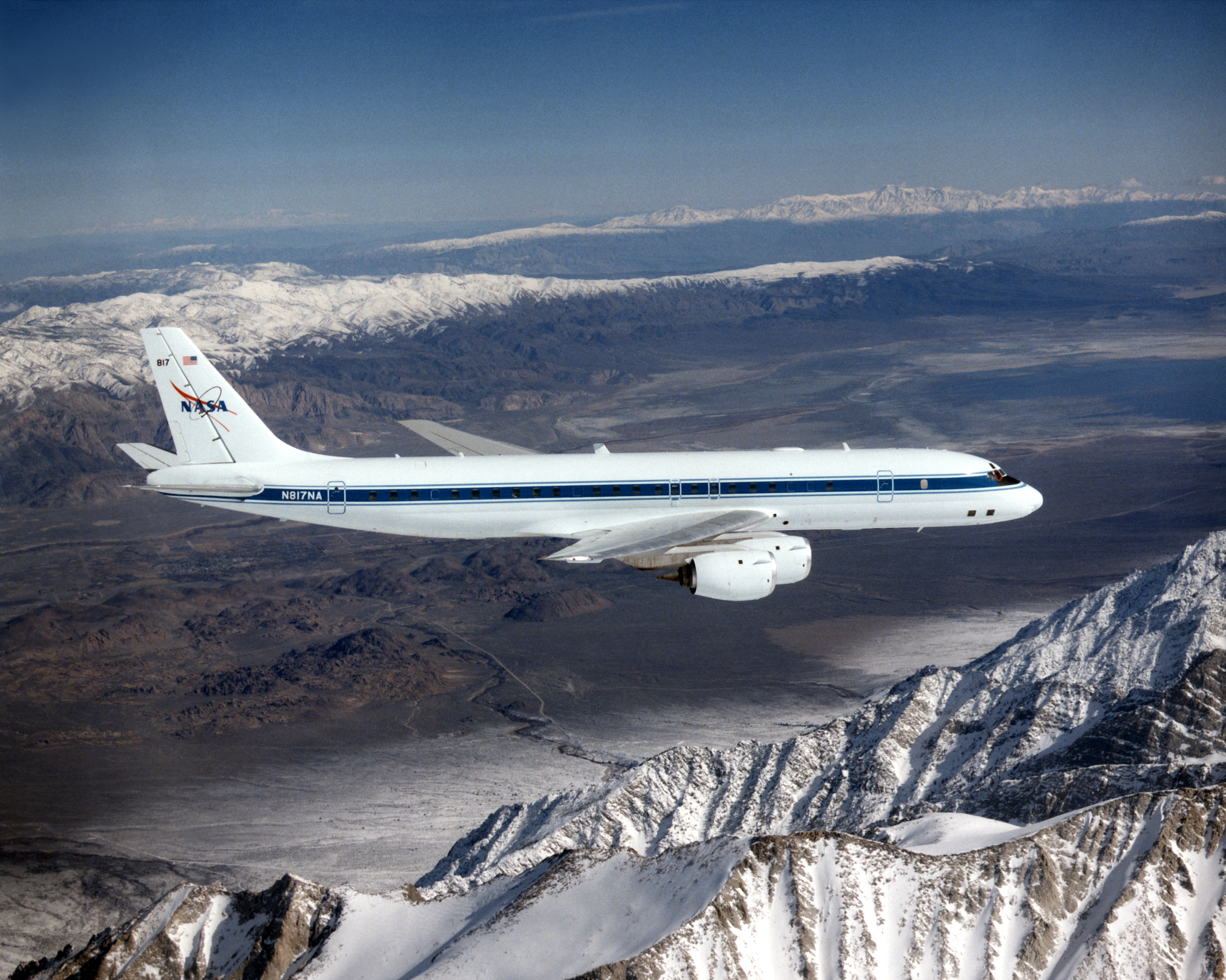
A Douglas DC-8 in 1998. Hubbard described Xenu's spacecraft as resembling DC-8s without their turbofans.

The story of Xenu is covered in OT III, part of Scientology's confidential upper levels taught only to advanced members who have undergone many hours of auditing and reached the state of Clear followed by Operating Thetan levels OT I and OT II. It is described in more detail in the accompanying confidential "Assists" lecture of October 3, 1968, and is dramatized in Revolt in the Stars, a screen-story in novelistic form written by L. Ron Hubbard in 1977.

Hubbard wrote that Xenu was the ruler of a Galactic Confederacy 75 million years ago, which consisted of 26 stars and 76 planets including Earth, which was then known as "Teegeeack". The planets were overpopulated, containing an average population of 178 billion. The Galactic Confederacy's civilization was comparable to our own, with aliens "walking around in clothes which looked very remarkably like the clothes they wear this very minute" and using cars, trains and boats looking exactly the same as those "circa 1950, 1960" on Earth.

Xenu was about to be deposed from power, so he devised a plot to eliminate the excess population from his dominions. With the assistance of psychiatrists, he gathered billions of his citizens under the pretense of income tax inspections, then paralyzed them and froze them in a mixture of alcohol and glycol to capture their souls. The kidnapped populace was loaded into spacecraft for transport to the site of extermination, the planet of Teegeeack (Earth). The appearance of these spacecraft would later be subconsciously expressed in the design of the Douglas DC-8, the only difference being that "the DC8 had fans, propellers on it and the space plane didn't". When they had reached Teegeeack, the paralyzed citizens were off-loaded, and placed around the bases of volcanoes across the planet. Hydrogen bombs were then lowered into the volcanoes and detonated simultaneously, killing all but a few aliens. Hubbard described the scene in his film script, Revolt in the Stars:

Simultaneously, the planted charges erupted. Atomic blasts ballooned from the craters of Loa, Vesuvius, Shasta, Washington, Fujiyama, Etna, and many, many others. Arching higher and higher, up and outwards, towering clouds mushroomed, shot through with flashes of flame, waste and fission. Great winds raced tumultuously across the face of Earth, spreading tales of destruction ...

— L. Ron Hubbard, Revolt in the Stars

The now-disembodied victims' souls, which Hubbard called thetans, were blown into the air by the blast. They were captured by Xenu's forces using an "electronic ribbon" ("which also was a type of standing wave") and sucked into "vacuum zones" around the world. The hundreds of billions of captured thetans were taken to a type of cinema, where they were forced to watch a "three-D, super colossal motion picture" for thirty-six days. This implanted what Hubbard termed "various misleading data" (collectively termed the R6 implant) into the memories of the hapless thetans, "which has to do with God, the Devil, space opera, etcetera". This included all world religions; Hubbard specifically attributed Roman Catholicism and the image of the Crucifixion to the influence of Xenu. The two "implant stations" cited by Hubbard were said to have been located on Hawaii and Las Palmas in the Canary Islands.

In addition to implanting new beliefs in the thetans, the images deprived them of their sense of personal identity. When the thetans left the projection areas, they started to cluster together in groups of a few thousand, having lost the ability to differentiate between each other. Each cluster of thetans gathered into one of the few remaining bodies that survived the explosion. These became what are known as body thetans, which are said to be still clinging to and adversely affecting everyone, except Scientologists who have performed the necessary steps to remove them.

A government faction known as the Loyal Officers finally overthrew Xenu and his renegades, and locked him away in "an electronic mountain trap" from which he has not escaped. Although the location of Xenu is sometimes said to be the Pyrenees on Earth, this is actually the location Hubbard gave elsewhere for an ancient "Martian report station". Teegeeack was subsequently abandoned by the Galactic Confederacy and remains a pariah "prison planet" to this day, although it has suffered repeatedly from incursions by alien "Invader Forces" since that time.

In 1988, the cost of learning these secrets from the Church of Scientology was £3,830, or US$6,500. This is in addition to the cost of the prior courses which are necessary to be eligible for OT III, which in 2006 was often well over US$100,000 (equivalent to $160,000 in 2025). Belief in Xenu and body thetans is a requirement for a Scientologist to progress further along the Bridge to Total Freedom. Those who do not experience the benefits of the OT III course are expected to pay for it again and repeat the level.

== Scientology doctrine ==
Within Scientology, the Xenu story is referred to as "The Wall of Fire" or "Incident II". Hubbard attached tremendous importance to it, saying that it constituted "the secrets of a disaster which resulted in the decay of life as we know it in this sector of the galaxy". The broad outlines of the story—that 75 million years ago a great catastrophe happened in this sector of the galaxy which caused profoundly negative effects for everyone since then—are told to lower-level Scientologists; but the details are kept strictly confidential.

In the OT III document, Hubbard asserts that he entered the Wall of Fire but emerged alive, "probably the only one ever to do so in 75,000,000 years". He first announced his "breakthrough" in Ron's Journal 67 (RJ67), a taped lecture recorded on September 20, 1967, to be sent to all Scientology staff and students. According to Hubbard, his research was achieved at the cost of a broken back, knee, and arm. OT III contains a warning that the R6 implant is "calculated to kill (by pneumonia etc.) anyone who attempts to solve it". Hubbard claimed that his "tech development"—i.e. his OT materials—had neutralized this threat, creating a safe path through the Wall of Fire.

The Church of Scientology forbids individuals from reading the OT III Xenu materials without first having taken the prerequisite courses. Scientologists warn that reading the Xenu story without proper authorization could cause pneumonia.

In RJ67, Hubbard alludes to the devastating effect of Xenu's purported genocide:

And it is very true that a great catastrophe occurred on this planet and in the other 75 planets which formed this Confederacy 75 million years ago. It has since that time been a desert, and it has been the lot of just a handful to try to push its technology up to a level where someone might adventure forward, penetrate the catastrophe, and undo it. We're well on our way to making this occur. — L. Ron Hubbard in RJ67

OT III also deals with "Incident I", set four quadrillion years ago, though scientific consensus places the age of the universe at approximately 13.8 billion years old. In Incident I, the unsuspecting thetan was subjected to a loud snapping noise followed by a flood of luminescence, then saw a chariot followed by a trumpeting cherub. After a loud set of snaps, the thetan was overwhelmed by darkness. It is described that these traumatic memories alone dissociate thetans from their static (natural, godlike) state.

Hubbard uses the existence of body thetans to explain many of the physical and mental ailments of humanity which, he says, prevent people from achieving their highest spiritual levels. OT III tells the Scientologist to locate body thetans and release them from the effects of Incidents I and II. This is accomplished in solo auditing, where the Scientologist holds both cans of an E-meter in one hand and asks questions as an auditor. The Scientologist is directed to find a cluster of body thetans, address it telepathically as a cluster, and take first the cluster, then each individual member, through Incident II, then Incident I if needed. Hubbard warns that this is a painstaking procedure, and that OT levels IV to VII are necessary to continue dealing with one's body thetans.

The Church of Scientology has objected to the Xenu story being used to paint Scientology as science fiction fantasy. Hubbard's statements concerning the R6 implant have been a source of contention. Critics and some Christians state that Hubbard's statements regarding R6 prove that Scientology doctrine is incompatible with Christianity, despite the Church's statements to the contrary. In "Assists", Hubbard says:

Everyman is then shown to have been crucified so don't think that it's an accident that this crucifixion, they found out that this applied. Somebody somewhere on this planet, back about 600 BC, found some pieces of R6, and I don't know how they found it, either by watching madmen or something, but since that time they have used it and it became what is known as Christianity. The man on the Cross. There was no Christ. But the man on the cross is shown as Everyman.

== Origins of the story ==
Hubbard wrote OT III in late 1966 and early 1967 in North Africa while on his way to Las Palmas to join the Enchanter, the first vessel of his private Scientology fleet. (OT III says "In December 1967 I knew someone had to take the plunge", but the material was publicized well before this.) He emphasized later that OT III was his own personal discovery.

Critics of Scientology have suggested that other factors may have been at work. In a letter of the time to his wife Mary Sue, Hubbard said that, in order to assist his research, he was drinking alcohol and taking stimulants and depressants ("I'm drinking lots of rum and popping pinks and greys"). His assistant at the time, Virginia Downsborough, said that she had to wean him off the diet of drugs to which he had become accustomed. Russell Miller posits in Bare-faced Messiah that it was important for Hubbard to be found in a debilitated condition, so as to present OT III as "a research accomplishment of immense magnitude".

Elements of the Xenu story appeared in Scientology before OT III. Hubbard's descriptions of extraterrestrial conflicts were put forward as early as 1950 in his book Have You Lived Before This Life?, and were enthusiastically endorsed by Scientologists who documented their past lives on other planets.

== Influence of OT III on Scientology ==
The volcano and fireball on the cover of Dianetics refers to the Xenu story.

The 1968 and subsequent reprints of Dianetics have had covers depicting an exploding volcano, which is reportedly a reference to OT III. In a 1968 lecture, and in instructions to his marketing staff, Hubbard explained that these images would "key in" the submerged memories of Incident II and impel people to buy the books:

A special 'Book Mission' was sent out to promote these books, now empowered and made irresistible by the addition of these overwhelming symbols or images. Organization staff were assured that if they simply held up one of the books, revealing its cover, that any bookstore owner would immediately order crateloads of them. A customs officer, seeing any of the book covers in one's luggage, would immediately pass one on through.

— Bent Corydon, L. Ron Hubbard, Messiah or Madman?

Since the 1980s, the volcano has also been depicted in television commercials advertising Dianetics. Scientology's "Sea Org", an elite group within the church that originated with Hubbard's personal staff aboard his fleet of ships, takes many of its symbols from the story of Xenu and OT III. It is explicitly intended to be a revival of the "Loyal Officers" who overthrew Xenu. Its logo, a wreath with 26 leaves, represents the 26 stars of Xenu's Galactic Confederacy. According to an official Scientology dictionary, "the Sea Org symbol, adopted and used as the symbol of a Galactic Confederacy far back in the history of this sector, derives much of its power and authority from that association".

In the Advanced Orgs in Edinburgh and Los Angeles, Scientology staff were at one time ordered to wear all-white uniforms with silver boots, to mimic Xenu's Galactic Patrol as depicted on the cover of Dianetics: The Evolution of a Science. This was reportedly done on the basis of Hubbard's declaration in his Flag Order 652 that mankind would accept regulation from that group which had last betrayed it—hence the imitation of Xenu's henchmen. In Los Angeles, a nightwatch was ordered to watch for returning spaceships.

The Church of Scientology's own organizational structure is said to be based on that of the Galactic Confederacy. The Church's "org board" is "a refined board ... of an old galactic civilization. ... We applied Scientology to it and found out why the civilization eventually failed. They lacked a couple of departments and that was enough to mess it all up. And they only lasted 80 trillion [years]."

== Name ==
The manuscript of OT III contains the only known example of Xenu's name in Hubbard's handwriting.

The name has been spelled both as Xenu and Xemu. The Class VIII course material includes a three-page text, handwritten by Hubbard, headed "Data", in which the Xenu story is given in detail. Hubbard's indistinct handwriting makes either spelling possible, particularly as the use of the name on the first page of OT III is the only known example of the name in his handwriting. In the "Assists" lecture, Hubbard speaks of "Xenu, ahhh, could be spelled X-E-M-U" and clearly says "Xemu" several times on the recording. The treatment of Revolt in the Stars—which is typewritten—uses Xenu exclusively.

It has been speculated that the name derives from Xemnu, an extraterrestrial comic book villain who first appeared in the story "I Was a Slave of the Living Hulk!" in Journey into Mystery #62 (November 1960). He was created by Stan Lee and Jack Kirby. Xemnu is a giant, hairy intergalactic criminal who escaped a prison planet, traveled to Earth, and hypnotized the entire human population. Upon Xemnu's defeat by electrician Joe Harper, Xemnu is imprisoned in a state of continual electric shock in orbit around the Sun, and humanity is left with no memory of Xemnu's existence.

== Church of Scientology's position ==
In its public statements, the Church of Scientology has been reluctant to allow any mention of Xenu. A passing mention by a trial judge in 1997 prompted the Church's lawyers to have the ruling sealed, although this was reversed. In the relatively few instances in which it has acknowledged Xenu, Scientology has stated the story's true meaning can only be understood after years of study. They complain of critics using it to paint the religion as a science-fiction fantasy.

Senior members of the Church of Scientology have several times publicly denied or minimized the importance of the Xenu story, but others have affirmed its existence. In 1995, Scientology lawyer Earl Cooley hinted at the importance of Xenu in Scientology doctrine by stating that "thousands of articles are written about Coca-Cola, and they don't print the formula for Coca-Cola". Scientology has many graduated levels through which one can progress. Many who remain at lower levels in the church are unaware of much of the Xenu story which is first revealed on Operating Thetan level three, or "OT III". Because the information imparted to members is to be kept secret from others who have not attained that level, the member must publicly deny its existence when asked. OT III recipients must sign an agreement promising never to reveal its contents before they are given the manila envelope containing the Xenu knowledge. Its knowledge is so dangerous, members are told, that anyone learning this material before they are ready could become afflicted with pneumonia.

Religious Technology Center director Warren McShane testified in a 1995 court case that the Church of Scientology receives a significant amount of its revenue from fixed donations paid by Scientologists to study the OT materials. McShane said that Hubbard's work "may seem weird" to those that have not yet completed the prior levels of coursework in Scientology. McShane said the story had never been secret, although maintaining there were nevertheless trade secrets contained in OT III. McShane discussed the details of the story at some length and specifically attributed the authorship of the story to Hubbard.

When John Carmichael, the president of the Church of Scientology of New York, was asked about the Xenu story, he said, as reported in the September 9, 2007, edition of The Daily Telegraph: "That's not what we believe". When asked directly about the Xenu story by Ted Koppel on ABC's Nightline, Scientology leader David Miscavige said that he was taking things Hubbard said out of context. However, in a 2006 interview with Rolling Stone, Mike Rinder, the then-director of the church's Office of Special Affairs, said that "It is not a story, it is an auditing level", when asked about the validity of the Xenu story.

In a BBC Panorama programme that aired on May 14, 2007, senior Scientologist Tommy Davis interrupted when celebrity members were asked about Xenu, saying: "None of us know what you're talking about. It's loony. It's weird." In March 2009, Davis was interviewed by investigative journalist Nathan Baca for KESQ-TV and was again asked about the OT III texts. Davis told Baca "I'm familiar with the material", and called it "the confidential scriptures of the Church". In an interview on ABC News Nightline, October 23, 2009, Davis walked off the set when Martin Bashir asked him about Xenu. He told Bashir, "Martin, I am not going to discuss the disgusting perversions of Scientology beliefs that can be found now commonly on the internet and be put in the position of talking about things, talking about things that are so fundamentally offensive to Scientologists to discuss. ... It is in violation of my religious beliefs to talk about them." When Bashir repeated a question about Xenu, Davis pulled off his microphone and left the set.

In November 2009 the Church of Scientology's representative in New Zealand, Mike Ferris, was asked in a radio interview about Xenu. The radio host asked, "So what you're saying is, Xenu is a part of the religion, but something that you don't want to talk about". Ferris responded, "Sure". Ferris acknowledged that Xenu "is part of the esoterica of Scientology".

== Leaking of the story ==
Despite the Church of Scientology's efforts to keep the story secret, details have been leaked over the years. OT III was first revealed in Robert Kaufman's 1972 book Inside Scientology, in which Kaufman detailed his own experiences of OT III. It was later described in a 1981 Clearwater Sun article, and came to greater public fame in a 1985 court case brought against Scientology by Lawrence Wollersheim. The church failed to have the documents sealed and attempted to keep the case file checked out by a reader at all times, but the story was summarized in the Los Angeles Times and detailed in William Poundstone's Bigger Secrets (1986) from information presented in the Wollersheim case. In 1987, a book by L. Ron Hubbard Jr., L. Ron Hubbard, Messiah or Madman? quoted the first page of OT III and summarized the rest of its content.

Xenu as depicted by Panorama

Since then, news media have mentioned Xenu in coverage of Scientology or its celebrity proponents such as Tom Cruise. In 1987, the BBC's investigative news series Panorama aired a report titled "The Road to Total Freedom?" which featured an outline of the OT III story in cartoon form.

On December 24, 1994, the Xenu story was published on the Internet for the first time in a posting to the Usenet newsgroup alt.religion.scientology, through an anonymous remailer. This led to an online battle between Church of Scientology lawyers and detractors. Older versions of OT levels I to VII were brought as exhibits attached to a declaration by Steven Fishman on April 9, 1993, as part of Church of Scientology International v. Fishman and Geertz. The text of this declaration and its exhibits, collectively known as the Fishman Affidavit, were posted to the Internet newsgroup alt.religion.scientology in August 1995 by Arnie Lerma and on the World Wide Web by David S. Touretzky. This was a subject of great controversy and legal battles for several years. There was a copyright raid on Lerma's house (leading to massive mirroring of the documents) and a suit against Dutch writer Karin Spaink—the Church bringing suit on copyright violation grounds for reproducing the source material, and also claiming rewordings would reveal a trade secret.

The Church of Scientology's attempts to keep Xenu secret have been cited in court findings against it. In September 2003, a Dutch court, in a ruling in the case against Karin Spaink, stated that one objective in keeping OT II and OT III secret was to wield power over members of the Church of Scientology and prevent discussion about its teachings and practices:

Despite his claims that premature revelation of the OT III story was lethal, L. Ron Hubbard wrote a screenplay version under the title Revolt in the Stars in the 1970s. This revealed that Xenu had been assisted by beings named Chi ("the Galactic Minister of Police") and Chu ("the Executive President of the Galactic Interplanetary Bank"). It has not been officially published, although the treatment was circulated around Hollywood in the early 1980s. Unofficial copies of the screenplay circulate on the Internet.

On March 10, 2001, a user posted the text of OT3 to the online community Slashdot. The site owners took down the comment after the Church of Scientology issued a legal notice under the Digital Millennium Copyright Act. Critics of the Church of Scientology have used public protests to spread the Xenu secret. This has included creating web sites with "xenu" in the domain name, and displaying the name Xenu on banners and protest signs.

== In popular culture ==
Xenu as depicted in South Park

Versions of the Xenu story have appeared in both television shows and stage productions. The Off-Broadway satirical musical A Very Merry Unauthorized Children's Scientology Pageant, first staged in 2003 and winner of an Obie Award in 2004, featured children in alien costumes telling the story of Xenu.

The Xenu story was also satirized in a November 2005 episode of the animated television series South Park titled "Trapped in the Closet". The Emmy-nominated episode revolved around Stan being brought into Scientology, with many coming to believe he's the reincarnation of L. Ron Hubbard. Confidently, the president of the church attempts to explain the story of Xenu, depicting the figure as a vaguely humanoid alien with tentacles for arms, in a sequence that had the words "This Is What Scientologists Actually Believe" superimposed on screen.

In a 2013 episode of The Eric Andre Show, a prank skit parodying both the Church of Scientology and the pseudohistorical teachings of the Black Hebrew Israelites features Andre and a group of "Black Scientologists" chanting: "Who do we want? Xenu! When do we want him? Ten trillion years!"

== Commentary ==
Writing in the book Scientology published by Oxford University Press, contributor Mikael Rothstein observes that, "To my knowledge no real analysis of Scientology's Xenu myth has appeared in scholarly publications. The most sober and enlightening text about the Xenu myth is probably the article on Wikipedia (English version) and, even if brief, Andreas Grünschloss's piece on Scientology in Lewis (2000: 266–268)." Rothstein places the Xenu text by L. Ron Hubbard within the context of a creation myth within the Scientology methodology, and characterizes it as "one of Scientology's more important religious narratives, the text that apparently constitutes the basic (sometimes implicit) mythology of the movement, the Xenu myth, which is basically a story of the origin of man on Earth and the human condition." Rothstein describes the phenomenon within a belief system inspired by science fiction, and notes that the "myth about Xenu, ... in the shape of a science fiction-inspired anthropogony, explains the basic Scientological claims about the human condition."

Andreas Grünschloß analyzes the Xenu text in The Oxford Handbook of New Religious Movements, within the context of a discussion on UFO religions. He characterizes the text as "Scientology's secret mythology (contained especially in the OT III teachings)". Grünschloß points out that L. Ron Hubbard, "also wrote a science fiction story called Revolt in the Stars, where he displays this otherwise arcane story about the ancient ruler Xenu in the form of an ordinary science fiction novel". Grünschloß posits, "because of the connections between several motifs in Hubbard's novels and specific Scientology teachings, one might perceive Scientology as one of the rare instances where science fiction (or fantasy literature generally) is related to the successful formation of a new spiritual movement." Comparing the fusion between the two genres of Hubbard's science fiction writing and Scientology creation myth, Grünschloß writes, "Although the science fiction novels are of a different genre than other 'techno-logical' disclosures of Hubbard, they are highly appreciated by participants, and Hubbard's literary output in this realm (including the latest movie, Battlefield Earth) is also well promoted by the organization." Writing in the book UFO Religions edited by Christopher Partridge, Grünschloß observes, "the enthusiasm for ufology and science fiction was cultivated in the formative phase of Scientology. Indeed, even the highly arcane story of the intergalactic ruler Xenu ... is related by Hubbard in the style of a simple science fiction novel".

Several authors have pointed out structural similarities between the Xenu story and the mythology of gnosticism. James A. Herrick, writing about the Xenu text in The Making of the New Spirituality: The Eclipse of the Western Religious Tradition, notes that "Hubbard's gnostic leanings are evident in his account of human origins ... In Hubbard, ideas first expressed in science fiction are seamlessly transformed into a worldwide religion with affinities to gnosticism." Mary Farrell Bednarowski, writing in America's Alternative Religions, similarly states that the outline of the Xenu mythology is "not totally unfamiliar to the historian acquainted with ancient gnosticism", noting that many other religious traditions have the practice of reserving certain texts to high-level initiates. Nevertheless, she writes, the Xenu story arouses suspicion in the public about Scientology and adds fuel to "the claims that Hubbard's system is the product of his creativity as a science fiction writer rather than a theologian."

Authors Michael McDowell and Nathan Robert Brown discuss misconceptions about the Xenu text in their book World Religions at Your Fingertips, and observe, "Probably the most controversial, misunderstood, and frequently misrepresented part of the Scientology religion has to do with a Scientology myth commonly referred to as the Legend of Xenu. While this story has now been undoubtedly proven a part of the religion (despite the fact that church representatives often deny its existence), the story's true role in Scientology is often misrepresented by its critics as proof that they 'believe in alien parasites.' While the story may indeed seem odd, this is simply not the case." The authors write that "The story is actually meant to be a working myth, illustrating the Scientology belief that humans were at one time spiritual beings, existing on infinite levels of intergalactic and interdimensional realities. At some point, the beings that we once were became trapped in physical reality (where we remain to this day). This is supposed to be the underlying message of the Xenu story, not that humans are "possessed by aliens". McDowell and Brown conclude that these inappropriate misconceptions about the Xenu text have had a negative impact, "Such harsh statements are the reason many Scientologists now become passionately offended at even the mention of Xenu by nonmembers."

The free speech lawyer Mike Godwin analyzes actions by the Scientology organization to protect and keep secret the Xenu text, within a discussion in his book Cyber Rights about the application of trade secret law on the Internet. Godwin explains, "trade secret law protects the information itself, not merely its particular expression. Trade secret law, unlike copyright, can protect ideas and facts directly." He puts forth the question, "But did the material really qualify as 'trade secrets'? Among the material the church has been trying to suppress is what might be called a 'genesis myth of Scientology': a story about a galactic despot named Xenu who decided 75 million years ago to kill a bunch of people by chaining them to volcanoes and dropping nuclear bombs on them." Godwin asks, "Does a 'church' normally have 'competitors' in the trade secret sense? If the Catholics got hold of the full facts about Xenu, does this mean they'll get more market share?" He comments on the ability of the Scientology organization to utilize such laws in order to contain its secret texts, "It seems likely, given what we know about the case now, that even a combination of copyright and trade secret law wouldn't accomplish what the church would like to accomplish: the total suppression of any dissemination of church documents or doctrines." The author concludes, "But the fact that the church was unlikely to gain any complete legal victories in its cases didn't mean that they wouldn't litigate. It's indisputable that the mere threat of litigation, or the costs of actual litigation, may accomplish what the legal theories alone do not: the effective silencing of many critics of the church."

== See also ==
- Space opera in Scientology
- Incidents and implants in Scientology
- Sinister Barrier, a 1939 novel with similar themes
