= Thetan =

Scientology concept of life-force

- Type: Concept in Scientology
- Description: The spiritual being or true self, considered immortal and separate from the physical body and mind
- Role: Central to Scientology beliefs about identity, past lives, and spiritual progress
- Associated controversies: Claims of past-life recall, extraterrestrial origins, and unverifiable spiritual abilities

In Scientology beliefs, the concept of the thetan (/ˈθeɪtən/) is the spiritual being or self that constitutes the true identity of a person, and is distinct from the body and mind it inhabits and controls. Scientology teaches that a thetan is immortal, has lived through many past lives, does not cease to exist at body-death, and is typically reincarnated into a new body. Scientology also teaches that a thetan can temporarily separate from the body in a process known as "exteriorization". The concept forms the basis of Scientology's understanding of consciousness, personal identity, and spiritual development. The term is derived from the Greek letter Θ, theta, which in Scientology represents "the source of life and life itself."

== Origins of the concept ==
The concept for the thetan was first described in the early 1950s by L. Ron Hubbard, drawing on reports by Dianetics practitioners, who in session found clients came up with descriptions of past-life experiences. He adopted the Greek letter theta (Θ) to represent "the source of life and life itself".

Hubbard once defined a thetan as: "... having no mass, no wave-length, no energy, no measurable qualities and no time or location in space except by consideration or postulate. The spirit is not a thing. It is the creator of things." In a lecture series later published as a book ("The Phoenix Lectures"), he jokingly pointed to a study that implied that a "thetan" manifests a small but measurable amount of mass:

From some experiments conducted about fifteen or twenty years ago—a thetan weighed about 1.5 ounces [45 grams]! Who made these experiments? Well, a doctor made these experiments. He weighed people before and after death, retaining any mass. He weighed the person, bed and all, and he found that the weight dropped at the moment of death about 1.5 ounces [45 grams] and some of them 2 ounces [60 grams]. (Those were super thetans!)

— L. Ron Hubbard

Although Hubbard did not name the doctor concerned, there was indeed such an attempt, by Duncan MacDougall, to measure the weight of dying patients to determine the weight of the soul, although MacDougall's experiments took place about fifty years before Hubbard's lectures, not fifteen or twenty, and are generally not regarded as having any scientific validity.

== Scientology doctrine ==
Hubbard taught that there were three parts of man: the spirit, mind, and body. The first of these is a person's true inner self, a "thetan".

Thetan has been described as:

- The thetan is immortal and is possessed of capabilities well in excess of those hitherto predicted for man.
- "The being who is the individual and who handles and lives in the body."
- "A thetan is not a thing, a thetan is the creator of things."
- A thetan is "the person himself—not his body or his name, the physical universe, his mind, or anything else; that which is aware of being aware; the identity which is the individual."

The word theta refers to the spiritual life force or energy of which thetans are composed, not part of the physical universe. Theta is associated with constructive qualities such as "reason, serenity, stability, happiness, cheerful emotion, persistence, and the other factors which man ordinarily considers desirable". The related term entheta (short for "enturbulated theta") refers to theta that has become disturbed or degraded, and in humans is associated with feelings of being "downcast, sad, upset or angry."

Scientology teaches that a thetan can "exteriorize", meaning it can separate from its human body while retaining awareness and the ability to perceive the environment. Exteriorization is described as a natural ability of the thetan that has been diminished over time, and Scientology auditing techniques aim to restore the ability to exteriorize at will.

According to Hubbard's son Ronald DeWolf (born L. Ron Hubbard Jr.), his father stated that thetans are immortal and perpetual, having willed themselves into existence at some point several trillion (Note: Billion in Long Scale) years ago. After they originated, thetans generated "points to view" or "dimension points", causing space to come into existence. They agreed that other thetans' dimension points existed, thus bringing into existence the entire universe.

In the primordial past, according to Scientologist teachings, thetans brought the material universe into being largely for their own pleasure." The universe is thought to have no independent reality, but to derive its apparent reality from the fact that most thetans agree it exists. Scientologists believe that thetans fell from grace when they began to identify with their creation, rather than their original state of spiritual purity. Eventually, they lost their memory of their true nature, along with the associated spiritual and creative powers. As a result, thetans came to think of themselves as nothing but embodied beings.

The Scientological notion of the thetan differs from other religions, such as Judaism and Christianity, in three significant ways. While other belief systems "fuse the concept of the body and soul", the thetan is "separate and independent". Also unlike the Judeo-Christian tradition, Scientologists believe that the thetan has "lived through many, perhaps thousands of lifetimes." Third, different from the Christian notion of original sin, Scientology believes that the thetan is basically good, but "has lost touch with its true nature."

Religious scholar Richard Holloway writes that thetans were not created, but they created themselves, adopting and creating the human body as a vehicle for existence.

== History and cosmology ==
Jon Atack, whose book A Piece of Blue Sky details how he reached Operating Thetan level V before leaving Scientology, describes Hubbard's doctrines about thetans: "Thetans are all-knowing beings, and became bored because there were no surprises. Hubbard asserted that the single most important desire in all beings is to have a 'game'. To have a 'game' it was necessary to 'not know' certain things, so certain perceptions were negated ('not-is-ed')." Since thetans knew everything, this required them to abandon or suppress perceptions and knowledge. Over time, the loss of perception accumulated and certain thetans began to cause harm to others. MEST (physical) beings also sought to "trap" thetans in order to control them. Thetans came to learn contrition, punishing themselves for their own "harmful" acts.

According to Hubbard, an essential part of the thetans' game was the "conquest" of matter, energy, space, and time by the life force, theta. This has produced multiple universes which have ended and begun in succession, each new one being more solid and entrapping than the last. The thetans have by now become so enmeshed in the physical universe that many have identified themselves totally with it, forgetting "their quadrillions (Note: Thousands of billions in Long Scale) of years of existence and their original godly powers, barely capable of even leaving their bodies at will".

According to Scientology, thetan powers are said to remain potent and restorable. One of the Church of Scientology's stated goals is "the rehabilitation of the human spirit", by which it means the restoration of the thetan's original abilities. Hubbard claims that thetans are able to change reality through "postulates"—decisions made by the individual about the nature of the reality around them. Some thetans are said to have (mis)used this ability to "implant" others with hypnotic suggestions, forcing other thetans to "cluster" around bodies (hence body thetans). This sort of directed control is referred to as "other-determinism". Scientology seeks to undo it and return the thetan to "self-determinism", where he can control himself and his environment. The eventual goal is to achieve "pan-determinism", where he acts for the good of all.

== Rebirth and afterlife ==
Thetans are believed to be reborn time and time again in new bodies through a process called "assumption" which is analogous to reincarnation. Dell deChant and Danny Jorgensen liken Scientology to Hinduism, in that both ascribe a causal relationship between the experiences of earlier incarnations and one's present life. With each rebirth, the effects of the MEST universe (MEST here stands for matter, energy, space, and time) on the thetan are believed to become stronger. Scientologists believe that the thetan has been "embodied on many occasions", but they generally avoid the term "reincarnation". They also reject the idea of transmigration, "i.e. the belief that the thetan would incarnate into any animal less than human." Scientology's first phase has to do with removing "encumbrances acquired in this life and in past existences," J. Gordon Melton writes. According to Melton, these encumbrances are called "engrams" and are "described as aberrations attached to the self that produce dysfunctional behavior patterns."

Non-Scientologists Joel Sappell and Robert Welkos described in a 1990 article in the LA Times how Scientologists believe that when a person dies—or, in Scientology terms, when a thetan abandons its physical body—they go to a "landing station" on the planet Venus, where the thetan is re-implanted and told lies about its past life and its next life. The Venusians take the thetan, "capsule" it, and send it back to Earth to be thrown into the ocean off the coast of California. They quote Hubbard as saying, "If you can get out of that, and through that, and wander around through the cities and find some girl who looks like she is going to get married or have a baby or something like that, you're all set. And if you can find the maternity ward to a hospital or something, you're OK. And you just eventually just pick up a baby."

In Scientology terminology, a thetan whose physical body has died is said to have "dropped the body".

While Hubbard's concept of the thetan led to the development of an elaborate cosmology, the doctrinal structure he created is based on the following propositions: "Man is an immortal spiritual being. His experience extends well beyond a single lifetime. His capabilities are unlimited, even if not presently realized."

== Operating Thetan ==
According to Scientology doctrine, a thetan exists whether operating a human body or not. Scientology states that they can rehabilitate the human spirit to a state where the individual can operate with or without a flesh body. The term "operating thetan" would then apply as it does when an individual is operating a body. The OT levels are the upper-level courses in Scientology.

The Church defines "Operating Thetan" as "knowing and willing cause over life, thought, and matter, energy, space and time (MEST)."

== Cleared Theta Clear ==
Even beyond the Operating Thetan levels comes the "Cleared Theta Clear", a godlike state which Hubbard describes this way:

A thetan who is completely rehabilitated and can do everything a thetan should do, such as move MEST and control others from a distance, or create his own universe; a person who is able to create his own universe or, living in the MEST universe is able to create illusions perceivable by others at will, to handle MEST universe objects without mechanical means and to have and feel no need of bodies or even the MEST universe to keep himself and his friends interested in existence.

== Body Thetan ==
A body thetan is a disincarnate thetan who is "stuck" in, on or near a human body, and all human bodies are said to be infested by these disembodied thetans, or clusters of them. This information is not revealed until a Scientologist reaches Section III of the Operating Thetan levels (commonly referred to as "OT III"). Body thetans were said by Hubbard to be a result of a prehistoric "Incident" involving Xenu.
