= Auditing (Scientology) =

Methodology of Scientologists

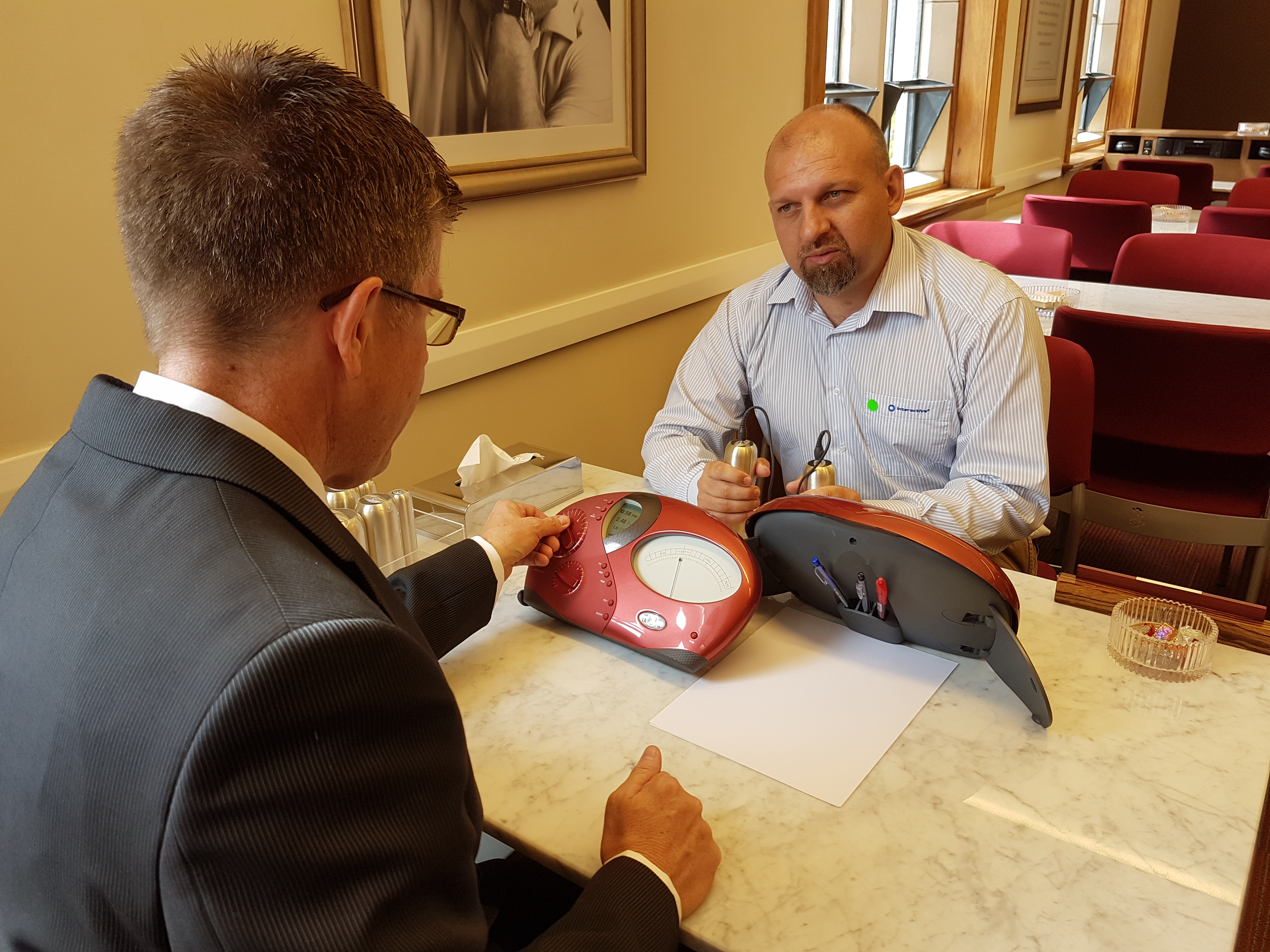
- A demonstration of Scientology auditing showing position of participants and tools
- Type: Practice in Scientology
- Description: Question-and-answer counseling sessions, often using the E-meter
- Role: A central practice in Scientology; half of the Bridge to Total Freedom
- Associated controversies: Use of the E-meter, high cost, false confidentiality, and allegations of coercive practices

Auditing, also called processing, is a central practice in Scientology in which a trained auditor asks structured questions intended to help a participant identify and address past experiences and emotional difficulties. Most auditing uses an E-meter, a device the Church of Scientology describes as a spiritual tool for detecting areas of mental or spiritual trauma, though courts and scientists have found it to have no medical or scientific validity. Auditing is presented as the primary method for advancing up Scientology's Bridge to Total Freedom, a graded series of levels involving procedures and rundowns, using concepts such as the reactive mind, engrams, and past‑life incidents and implants. Scholars and critics have variously described auditing as a form of psychological conditioning, hypnosis, or pseudotherapy, and have raised concerns about its methods, the misuse of confidential session records, and its space‑opera cosmology. There have been legal, regulatory, and ethical controversies related to its unproven medical claims, misuse of private information, the use of child labor, and the death of some participants.

== Terminology ==
L. Ron Hubbard assigned special meanings to many ordinary English words when he wrote about Scientology, and Scientologese has become a language in itself. These are some very basic meanings of words Scientology uses when describing this subject.

Auditing

The procedures where two individuals work together to improve one of the person's abilities and to reduce or eliminate their neuroses.

Auditor

A trained Scientologist who is helping another individual through the use of auditing techniques. An auditor is only allowed to audit processes (on others) up to the level of training they have completed (their 'class'). (Note: In The Bridge to Total Freedom, see training columns "Course" and "End Result", and processing columns "Subject Audited" and "Class of Auditor Required".)

Preclear

The person being questioned by an auditor. Also called a "PC".

Case

The collection of all the preclear's upsets and emotional baggage which auditing is trying to relieve. A preclear's case level is how far a preclear has advanced on the Bridge to Total Freedom.

Session

A single time when an auditor and preclear sit down to audit. The duration of a session can range from a few minutes to several hours.

Process

A specific step in auditing. It may consist of repeatedly asking the preclear the same question (an auditing command) until there is no more upset on that question. Many processes are run during a single session.

Rundown

A series of processes designed to handle a specific aspect of a case, such as communication, problems, or happiness. It may take many sessions to complete a rundown.

End phenomenon

Abbreviated "EP", it is what an auditor is looking for that indicates a process, session or rundown has been completed. The EP of a process might be that the preclear realizes something, is happy about it, and the e-meter is showing certain needle movements. The EP of a session might be that several processes have been performed, and the preclear is very happy about it so it is a good point to stop for the day. A rundown would have a specific EP, such as all auditing questions for the rundown have been asked, and the preclear has experienced some sort of realization such as saying they feel they could now communicate freely with anyone on any subject.

Intensive

An "intensive" is a block of 12 1/2 hours purchased in advance by the preclear for auditing services. Auditing is to occur intensively so that the 12 1/2 hours is performed within one week. At the end of each session, the hours and minutes used are written down on a form in the preclear's folder, deducted from the amount on account, and the balance is calculated.

== Description ==
The term "auditing" was coined by L. Ron Hubbard in 1950. Auditing in Scientology is an activity where a trained Scientologist, known as an auditor, listens and asks various questions to the subject, who is referred to as a "preclear" or "PC".

Auditing involves the use of "processes", which are sets of questions asked or directions given by an auditor. Based on a prior interview looking for "charged" subjects—"charge" being that which prevents the PC from thinking on a subject or getting rid of a subject or approaching a subject—on the E-meter, found by asking questions to the PC in regard to them and their fancied case. When the specific objective of any one "process" is achieved, the process is ended, and another can then be started. Through auditing, the subjects are said to free themselves from barriers that inhibit their natural abilities. Charged areas can be viewed as areas of misinformation or lies. Once uncovered, they dissipate as their truth becomes apparent and the charge is eliminated once viewed for what it really is, an untruth.

The Auditor's Code outlines a series of 29 promises which an auditor pledges, such as:

- Not to evaluate for the preclear or tell him what he should think about his case in session
- Not to invalidate the preclear's case or gains in or out of session
- Never to use the secrets of a preclear divulged in session for punishment or personal gain

The main intention of an auditing session is to remove "charged incidents" that have caused trauma, which are believed in Scientology to be stored in the "reactive mind". These incidents must then be eliminated for proper functioning.

In 1952, auditing techniques "began to focus on the goal of exteriorizing the thetan" with the goal of providing complete spiritual awareness.

=== Preclear ===
The "preclear" or "PC" is the person who is being audited—the client, formerly called the "patient". At most levels of auditing, there are two people present: the auditor is the one asking questions, and the preclear is the one answering them. In some of the upper levels, a person audits oneself, being both auditor and preclear at the same time. The term was created back when the ultimate goal of auditing was to create a person who had been cleared, ergo the person being audited was pre-Clear. However, even after Hubbard created the upper levels, the term preclear was still used even if the person had surpassed the state of Clear. The term has continued to represent the role in auditing rather than the level the person has attained.

During an auditing session, the auditor writes down the questions and the preclear's answers, and the papers are stored in the client's PC folder (preclear folder).

=== E-meter ===
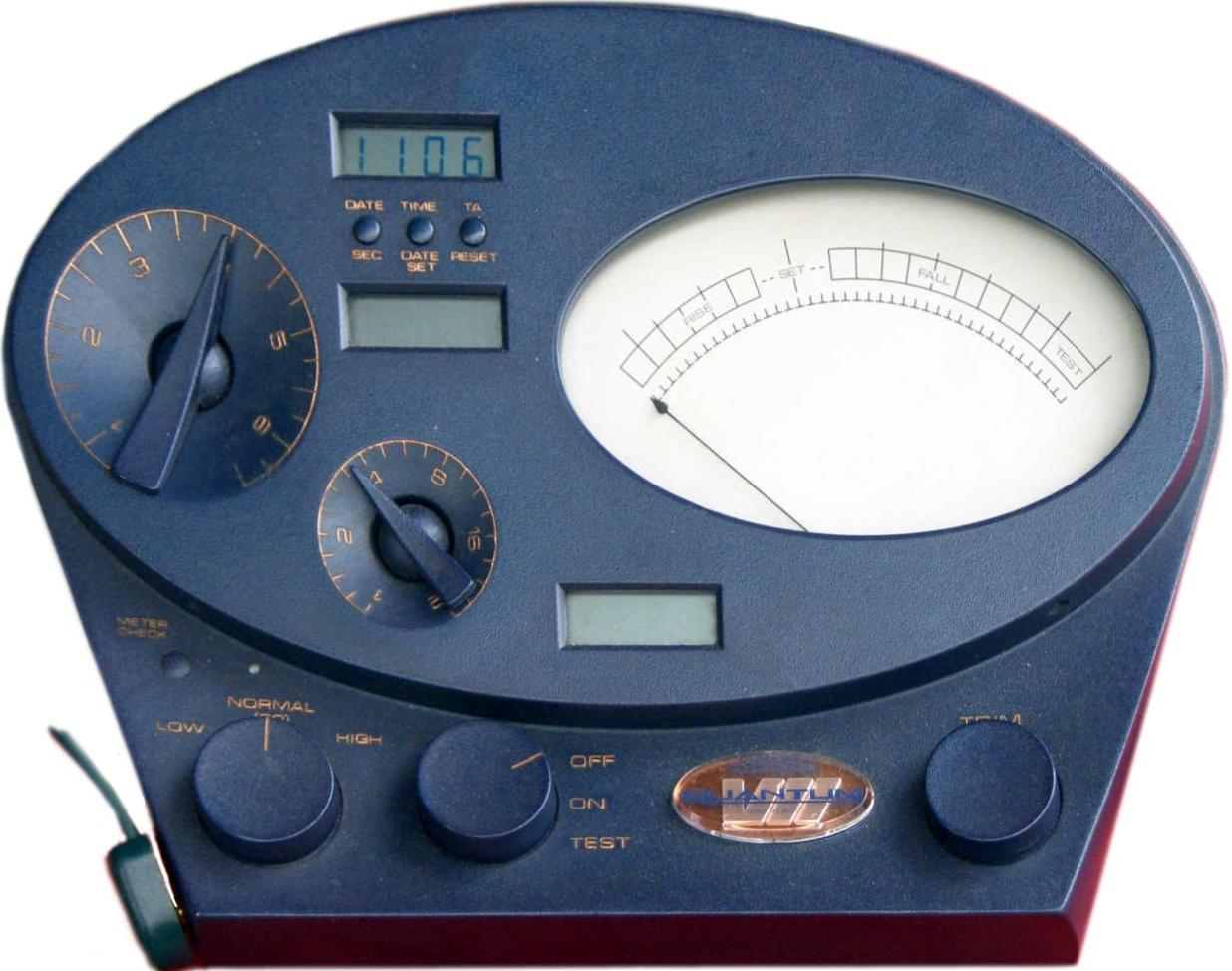
Mark Super VII Quantum E-meter

Most auditing sessions involve a device called the Hubbard Electropsychometer or E-meter. It consists of two handheld electrodes connected to a galvanometer. It measures changes in electrical resistance in the body (galvanic skin response). Scientology teaches that changes in electrical resistance indicate areas of "charge", meaning topics that contain emotional or spiritual distress.

According to L. Ron Hubbard, the E-Meter helps the auditor identify areas that need addressing by indicating which processes should be run and when a process or rundown is complete. Hubbard clarified how the E-Meter should be used in conjunction with auditing:

Auditing is aimed at reactivity. You run what reacts on the meter because it reacts and is therefore part of the reactive mind. A read means there is charge present and available to run. Running reading items, flows and questions is the only way to make a pc better. This is our purpose in auditing. —L. Ron Hubbard

The device is considered a "religious artifact" with no scientific validity and is not considered a medical or scientific instrument.

== Bridge to Total Freedom ==
The Bridge to Total Freedom (Bridge), also known as the Classification, Gradation and Awareness Chart (grade chart), is Scientology's primary road map to guide a person through the sequential steps to attain Scientology's concept of spiritual freedom. In Dianetics: The Modern Science of Mental Health, Hubbard used the analogy of a bridge: "We are here at a bridge between one state of Man and a next. We are above the chasm which divides a lower from a higher plateau and this chasm marks an artificial evolutionary step in the progress of Man. [...] In this handbook we have the basic axioms and a therapy which works. For God's sake, get busy and build a better bridge!" The current Classification, Gradation and Awareness Chart is printed with red ink on white paper and hangs as a poster in every Scientology organization. A newcomer to Scientology starts the Bridge at the bottom of the chart and rises through the levels, perhaps reaching the level of Clear, then continuing upward through the OT Levels to higher states of awareness and ability. Ultimately, the Scientologist hopes to become, as the sociologist David G. Bromley puts it, "an immortal, godlike expression of the life force".

== Procedure ==
Each Grade on the Bridge has a list of processes that auditors should run. Some auditing actions use commands, for example "Recall a time you knew you understood someone," and some auditing actions use questions such as, "What are you willing for me to talk to others about?" Below are sample commands from processes run in each Grade.

- ARC Straightwire: "Recall a communication."
- Grade 0: "Recall a place from which you have communicated to another."
- Grade I: "Recall a problem you have had with another."
- Grade II: "Recall a secret."
- Grade III: "Can you recall a time of change?"
- Grade IV: "What about a victim you could be responsible for?"

Each Grade targets at a specific area of potential difficulty a person might have. If the subject matter is not "charged"; in other words, if it is not causing any difficulty, then the E-meter will not show any reaction and the person will not be asked further questions on that subject.

John H. Wolfe differentiates auditing from interrogation, prayer, meditation, confession or hypnosis, instead likening it to nondirective therapy: "In its general philosophy and approach, auditing is closest to the nondirective therapy of Carl Rogers (1961), who stressed the importance of having the client find the client's own answers, while the counselor refrains from interpretation, but listens with empathic understanding. Auditing differs from Roger's approach by having the auditor direct the preclear's attention using auditing questions, and by breaking up the session into discrete cycles of action."

== Rundowns ==
Hubbard defines a rundown as "a series of steps which are auditing actions and processes designed to handle a specific aspect of a case and which have a known end phenomena". Hubbard devised dozens of rundowns. The main rundowns are the levels of the Bridge to Total Freedom, which are the codified sequential steps to attain Scientology's concept of spiritual freedom.

One of the earliest rundowns on the Bridge, which most Scientologists are expected to do, is the Purification Rundown. The "purif" is a sauna-and-sweat detoxification program requiring a high intake of vitamins, allegedly (Note: Reitman writes, "Doctors have questioned the effectiveness of the Purification Rundown, which has never been scientifically proven as effective and might in fact be dangerous. Its central component, niacin, is administered in extremely high doses," where such dosages can cause liver damage.) designed to remove toxins from the body that would inhibit one's recall needed for future auditing. Some of the basic levels of the Bridge include rundowns said to alleviate issues with communication, problems, and upsets. The Clear Certainty Rundown is the step where the Church of Scientology verifies that the preclear has correctly attained the State of Clear.

There are specialty rundowns such as the three very expensive "L's Rundowns" available only at Flag which are promoted as executive boosters and promise the ability to be stably exterior—outside of your body. The Super Power Rundown is intended to increase one's perceptions; Hubbard said people have 57 senses which he calls "perceptics".

One of the most controversial rundowns is the Introspection Rundown, which is alleged to handle a psychotic episode or complete mental breakdown but was a key factor in the death of Lisa McPherson and has been widely written about.

Numerous other rundowns are listed on the right margin of the Bridge to Total Freedom.

== Constructs ==
=== Reactive mind ===
The reactive mind (also called a reactive bank, or simply bank) is a concept formulated by Hubbard, referring to that portion of the human mind that is unconscious and operates on a stimulus-response basis. In the reactive mind are engrams which are recordings of incidents in one's life that Hubbard says cause most mental, emotional, and psychosomatic ailments.

What can it do? It can give a man arthritis, bursitis, asthma, allergies, sinusitis, coronary trouble, high blood pressure and so on down the whole catalogue of psycho-somatic ills, adding a few more which were never specifically classified as psycho-somatic, such as the common cold. —L. Ron Hubbard

The action of auditing is to locate these incidents and "erase" them, meaning they are removed from the unconscious reactive mind and re-filed into the person's conscious analytical mind.

=== Engram ===
The use of the word engram in Dianetics and Scientology is different from the meaning of "engram" in cognitive psychology. According to Hubbard, an engram is a detailed mental image or memory of a traumatic event from the past that occurred when an individual was partially or fully unconscious. Whenever something painful happens while one's "analytic mind" is unconscious, engrams are said to be recorded and stored within the reactive mind.

In 1950, Hubbard first described an engram as a "cellular level recording" that includes both physical and emotional pain, but later redefined his concept as being "a mental image picture of a moment of pain and unconsciousness".

Engrams are said to originate from painful incidents, which close down the "analytic function", leaving a person to operate only on the "reactive" level, where everything, including pain, position, and location are experienced as "aspects of the unpleasant whole." An engram is restimulated if the person is later reminded of the painful experience, causing feelings of guilt or embarrassment – another engram. This cycle is called a "lock" in Scientology terminology. Engrams are stored as series of incidents that are similar, called "chains".

Jeff Jacobsen compared the process of auditing engrams to the Freudian psychoanalytic concept of abreaction, equating engrams to the painful subconscious memories that abreaction therapy brings up to the conscious mind. He quoted Nathaniel Thornton, who compared abreaction to confession. Dorthe Refslund Christensen describes engrams in layman's terms as trauma, a means to explain the long and short term effects of painful experiences. According to Christensen, Hubbard wrote about the dramatization of an engram, where the one who suffered and recorded the pain as an engram relates all sensory perceptions during the time of the painful incident to the incident. These sensory perceptions become "restimulators" that remind the individual of the pain and triggers him or her to re-experience it.

Scholar Richard Holloway writes that according to Scientology, engrams are "damaging experiences that happen by accident," bruises through time implanted on thetans through the course of millions of lives. Sometimes the damage is intentionally inflicted by thetans who desired power over other thetans. Deliberate injuries are called implants in Scientology. Hubbard wrote, "Implants result in all varieties of illness, apathy, degradiation, neurosis and insanity and are the principle causes of these in man." The Christian idea of heaven is a deceptive implant, Hubbard taught, for there is an infinite series of lives after the first, contrary to the Christian notion of the afterlife.

The term engram was coined in 1904 by the German scholar Richard Semon, who defined it as a "stimulus impression" which could be reactivated by the recurrence of "the energetic conditions which ruled at the generation of the engram." Hubbard re-used Semon's concept when he published Dianetics: The Modern Science of Mental Health in 1950. He conceived of the engram as a form of "memory trace", an idea that had long existed in medicine. According to physician Joseph Winter, who collaborated with Hubbard during the early years of the Dianetics organizations, Hubbard had taken the term "engram" from a 1936 edition of Dorland's Medical Dictionary, where it was defined as "a lasting mark or trace...In psychology it is the lasting trace left in the psyche by anything that has been experienced psychically; a latent memory picture." Hubbard had originally used various terms such as "norn", "comanome" and "impediment" before settling on "engram" following a suggestion from Winter.

=== Incidents and implants ===
"Incidents" are events that happened to a person which continue to have a grip on their mind or spirit, and negatively affects them. It could be an accident or traumatic event that includes pain and subconscious commands, whether from this life or in a past life. Auditing procedures locate incidents in the person and relieve or erase them from the person's mind. (Note: Quotation: "The invention of language and the entrance of language into the engram bank of the reactive mind seriously complicates the mechanistic reactions. The engrams containing language impinge themselves upon the conscious mind as commands." —L. Ron Hubbard)

"Implants" are an element of some incidents involving externally-imposed memories that contain commands and fictitious events. Hubbard alleges that the person will believe the implanted incident actually existed, and the commands in the implant make the person act strangely. A contemporary analogy would be the installing of a hypnotic command. However, the implants Hubbard presents in his lectures and writings are characterized by past-life incidents set in technologically advanced, space opera scenarios. Typically, these implants involve electronic fields entrapping and zapping a thetan (the being), installing commands, and showing cinema-like moving pictures to install false memories. (Note: Glossary entry in Corydon (1987): "IMPLANT: Fundamentally any hypnotic suggestion. Hubbard defined it in terms of "space opera": a highly technical and complex system of mass hypnosis inflicted on populations by evil rulers. He claims that these implants have been inflicted upon everyone on the planet. An example of the "most devastating" of these are in the "Wall of Fire" chapter.) Such incidents are alleged to have occurred millions or trillions of years ago. (Note: L. Ron Hubbard used the short scale numbering system where a billion is 1,000,000,000, a trillion is 1,000,000,000,000, a quadrillion is 1,000,000,000,000,000, and a trillion trillion is "1" followed by 24 zeroes.) However, Hubbard believed that implantation is being performed in contemporary times by psychiatrists and priests.

Methods of trapping and implanting a thetan might include blasts of raw electricity, explosions, fantastic motion, or white energy. Hubbard named his implants based on elements in the narratives—like aircraft door, gorilla, hoipolloi, bear, black thetan, and invisible picture.

Hubbard wrote extensively about specific incidents and implants he alleged are common to all beings on earth, and which should be "audited out" (removed) in order to help a person become more sane or spiritually free. The incidents that have most been covered in media, scholarly works, and books include the between-lives implants, Christian-story implants, and the OT III implants known as the Xenu story.

Jon Atack wrote that "implants are [considered] the true foundation of the Reactive Mind" and specific implants are addressed by auditing on OT levels II and III. Hubbard names the earliest implant on the whole track as "Facsimile One", and describes the "Between-lives implants" as forgetter implants that cause humans to not remember their past lives.

Hubbard's incidents and implants are unique to Scientology beliefs and have not been proven to exist or to have happened. Critics have noted many scientific implausibilities connected with the OT III incidents. Peter Forde's paper "A Scientific Scrutiny of OT III" analyzes the matter in detail, and the placement of events trillions of years ago contradicts the currently accepted age of the Universe as 13.8 billion years.

Some examples of Hubbard's incidents and implants include the following.

Helatrobus implants
Hubbard describes the Helatrobus implants as occurring 52 to 382 trillion years ago by an alien nation called the Helatrobans, who sought to restrain minds by capturing and brainwashing thetans; these implants are said to be responsible for the concept of Heaven.

Heaven implants
The Heaven Implants were dated at "43,891,832,611,177 years, 344 days, 10 hours, 20 minutes and 40 seconds ago from 10:02 1/2 P.M. Daylight Greenwich Time May 9, 1963." They comprised two series of views of Heaven, the first of which was quite positive: Hubbard compares Heaven to "Busch Gardens in Pasadena". In the second series, Heaven had become a lot shabbier:

The place is shabby. The vegetation is gone. The pillars are scruffy. The saints have vanished. So have the Angels. A sign on one (the left as you "enter") says "This is Heaven". The right has a sign "Hell" with an arrow and inside the grounds one can see the excavations like archaeological diggings with raw terraces, that lead to "Hell".

After being ridiculed in the Anderson Report (a 1960s Australian public inquiry into Scientology), this bulletin was withdrawn from circulation.

Incident I
Incident I is set four quadrillion years ago, wherein an unsuspecting thetan was subjected to a loud snapping noise, followed by a flood of luminescence, then saw a chariot followed by a trumpeting cherub. After a loud set of snaps, the thetan was overwhelmed by darkness. This is described as the implant opening the gateway to the present universe, separating thetans from their static (natural/godlike) state. The incident is described in Operating Thetan level III (OT III), written in 1967.

R6 implants (Incident II)
The R6 Implants were the work of the Galactic Confederacy's tyrannical leader, Xenu, 75 million years ago. According to Hubbard, Xenu destroyed billions of captured subjects during Incident II by dropping them into volcanoes and attacking them with nuclear weapons. The subjects, once disembodied, were forced to watch a "three-D, super colossal motion picture" for thirty-six days. This implanted pictures "contain[ing] God, the Devil, Angels, space opera, theaters, helicopters, a constant spinning, a spinning dancer, trains and various scenes very like modern England."

Bodies in pawn
One of the more gruesome incidents is "Bodies in pawn":

A fellow is grabbed, hypnotized, shoved into an electronic field, and then told he is somewhere else. And so he departs—most of him—and goes to the new location while still being under control of the implanters. He picks up a [physical] body in the new location and starts living a life there, while still having a living body somewhere else. The implanters can keep his original body alive indefinitely, and control the [being] through it. If the [being] tries to flee, the hypnotizers simply cause pain to the original body, still alive in a vat of fluid, and he is immediately recalled. That's a BODY IN PAWN. It's a second body you may have, living somewhere else, right in present time. But the second body is not under YOUR direct control. —L. Ron Hubbard

== Controversies ==
=== Claimed benefits ===
L. Ron Hubbard claimed benefits from auditing including improved IQ, improved ability to communicate, enhanced memory and alleviation of issues such as psychosis, dyslexia and attention deficit disorder. Some people have alleged that auditing amounts to medical treatment without a license, and in the 1950s, some auditors were arrested on the charge. The Church of Scientology disputes that it is practicing medicine, and it has successfully established in United States courts of law that auditing addresses only spiritual relief. According to the Church, (Note: Use of "Church" or "the Church" is a common shortened form of "Church of Scientology"; see The Church (Scientology).) the psychotherapist treats mental health and the Church treats the spiritual being. Hubbard clarified the difference between the two:

If we processed a specific type of aberration, we of course would be in the field of mental healing, and so forth. But long ago we actually discovered that we must not process specific aberrations, which takes us out of the field of mental healing. It is quite fatal to do this because in the first place it's an evaluation for the case. In the second place, it's a negative type process; you're condemning the individual for hitting girls. Doesn't validate the individual at all. Do you follow? And if carried on very long, does not result in the betterment of an individual. All we're interested in is the spiritual betterment of the individual[.]

In 1971, a ruling of the United States District Court, District of Columbia (333 F. Supp. 357), specifically stated that the E-meter "has no proven usefulness in the diagnosis, treatment or prevention of any disease, nor is it medically or scientifically capable of improving any bodily function." As a result of this ruling, Scientology now publishes disclaimers in its books and publications declaring that the E-meter "by itself does nothing" and that it is used specifically for spiritual purposes.

=== Misuse of confidential information ===
Auditing sessions are permanently recorded in the form of handwritten notes stored in folders called preclear folders, which are supposed to be kept private and confidential. Judge Paul Breckenridge, in Church of Scientology of California v. Armstrong, noted that Mary Sue Hubbard (the plaintiff in that case) "authored the infamous order 'GO 121669', which directed culling of supposedly confidential P.C. files/folder for the purposes of internal security". This directive was later canceled because it was not part of Scientology as written by L. Ron Hubbard. Bruce Hines has noted in an interview with Hoda Kotb that Scientology's collecting of personal and private information through auditing can possibly leave an adherent vulnerable to potential "blackmail" should they ever consider disaffecting from the cult. A number of sources have claimed that information gleaned from preclear folders have indeed been used for intimidation and harassment.

=== Hypnosis ===
Auditing has been described by some scholars and government inquiries as involving hypnotic elements. Hassan and Scheflin (2024) states that Hubbard incorporated hypnotic techniques into auditing practice and that these techniques can induce a light hypnotic state and create dependency and obedience in the subject. In 1965 the Anderson Report, an official inquiry conducted for the state of Victoria, Australia, found that auditing involved a form of "authoritative" or "command" hypnosis, in which the hypnotist assumes "positive authoritative control" over the subject. The report stated: "It is the firm conclusion of this Board that most scientology and dianetic techniques are those of authoritative hypnosis and as such are dangerous [...] it is only in name that there is any difference between authoritative hypnosis and most of the techniques of scientology."

=== Child labor ===
Dutch investigative reporter Rinke Verkerk reported that she was given an auditing session by an 11-year-old in the Netherlands. This has been criticized by clinical psychologists and child psychologists, on the grounds that secondary trauma can affect children more strongly than adults. The fact that the child was working full days for a whole weekend was also considered to be problematic.

== Cost ==
The prices to undertake a full course of auditing with the Church of Scientology are not often advertised publicly. As of 2011 it can easily cost $400,000 to do the entirety of Scientology's "Bridge to Total Freedom" (equivalent to $572,000 in 2025). In a 1964 letter, Hubbard stated that a 25-hour block of auditing should cost the equivalent of "three months' pay for the average middle class working individual." In 2007, the fee for a 12 and a half hour block of auditing at the Tampa Org was $4000 (equivalent to $6,210 in 2025). The Church of Scientology is often criticized for the prices it charges for auditing, and examinations of its organizations have indicated that profit is their primary purpose. Hubbard stated that charging for auditing was necessary because the practice required an exchange, and should the auditor not receive something for their services it could harm both parties.

== See also ==
- Scientology security checks
