= Tory Christman =

American critic of Scientology (born 1947)

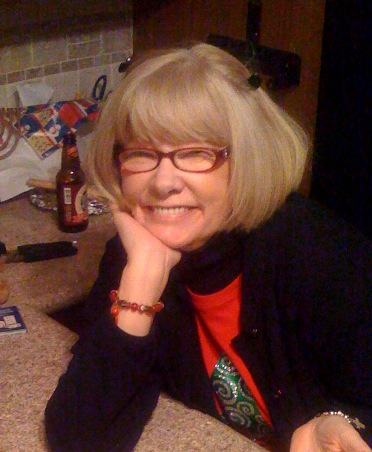
- Christman in 2008
- Born: June 27, 1947 (age 79)
- Other names: Tory Bezazian; Tory Magoo
- Years active: 1969–2000, Scientology member; 2000–present, public critic
- Known for: Critic of Scientology; Former member, Church of Scientology
- Children: 1
- Parent: Paul Christman
- Website: www.torymagoo.org

Tory Christman (born June 27, 1947) is an American critic of Scientology and former member of the organization.

Originally brought up a Catholic, Christman turned to Scientology after being introduced to the book Dianetics: The Modern Science of Mental Health authored by Scientology founder L. Ron Hubbard while staying with her parents in Chicago. She identified with concepts described in the book including the idea of attaining the Scientology state of clear, and became a member of the organization in 1969. She hitchhiked from Chicago to Los Angeles, in order to begin the process of studying Scientology, and initially felt that it helped improve her life. In 1972, she joined the core group of staff members within Scientology called the Sea Org. After being a member of the Scientology organization for ten years, Christman reached the spiritual Operating Thetan level of OT III, and learned the story of Xenu. She subsequently rose to a higher Operating Thetan level of OT VII, the second-highest within the organization. Her medical condition of epilepsy caused difficulty while in Scientology, as the organization did not approve of taking medication in order to manage her condition.

She became an ordained minister within Scientology, and instructed celebrity member actor John Travolta in initial coursework. Christman worked in various capacities during her time with Scientology, including for its drug rehabilitation organization Narconon, and at one of the organization's Celebrity Centres. After serving in these roles, Christman came to work for the Office of Special Affairs (OSA), which functions as an intelligence agency within Scientology. She participated in multiple missions for OSA, including a 1979 operation designed to advance the organization's interests in Clearwater, Florida, and a 1985 operation assisting OSA agents during a lawsuit filed against Scientology. In 1999, OSA agents removed the censorship software "Scieno Sitter" from Christman's home computer, in order to allow her to carry out a mission of monitoring critical material about Scientology on the Internet. It was in this capacity that she came across the Scientology critic website Operation Clambake, managed by Andreas Heldal-Lund.

Christman reported directly to OSA vice-president, Janet Weiland, about her efforts to remove criticism of Scientology from the media and online. She supervised the Scientology Parishioners League, a group dedicated to removing criticism about the organization from the press, media, and Internet. After an operation viewed as successful where Christman complained to MTV about a South Park parody involving Travolta and characters from the comedy series which satirized Scientology, she was assigned in 2000 to monitor postings to the newsgroup alt.religion.scientology. Christman took the screen name of "Magoo", and posted multiple times to the newsgroup in attempts to stifle criticism. This conflicted with her ideals of freedom of speech, and after Andreas Heldal-Lund reached out to her by email, she subsequently decided to leave Scientology.

After leaving Scientology, Christman's family and friends in the movement ceased communication with her, under the organization's policy of "disconnection." She traveled to Florida to join members of the Lisa McPherson Trust, a group dedicated to protesting against Scientology. For leaving Scientology and joining with a critic group, she felt she was subjected to the Scientology policy of "fair game"; a form of retribution for criticizing the organization. Christman has since become one of the more prominent critics of Scientology; she lectures and gives interviews about the organization internationally. In 2008 she took part in protests against Scientology organized by Project Chanology, itself started by the Internet-based group Anonymous but criticized the group for some of their initial illegal acts. Christman maintains an account on YouTube with the identification "ToryMagoo44", where she posts topically about Scientology. The Sunday Times characterized Christman in a 2009 article as "a fierce critic of the church".

== Early life ==
Christman was born in 1947; she is the daughter of Paul Christman, an American football player and member of the College Football Hall of Fame. Her father played college football for the University of Missouri and professionally for the Chicago Cardinals and Green Bay Packers. Her father had made over $4.5 million playing for NFL. Christman was raised Catholic. In 1969 at age 22, Christman went through a difficult period abusing heroin in San Francisco, California. Christman had left home for California with the intent of becoming a hippie. She required medical treatment after using a dirty hypodermic needle, and returned to her parents' residence in Chicago. While recuperating in Illinois after a stay at Lake Forest Hospital, two Scientologist friends persuaded her to join the Scientology organization.

She read the foundational text Dianetics: The Modern Science of Mental Health by Scientology founder, science fiction writer L. Ron Hubbard, and came to believe "it was a solution for helping other people". In recalling her initial thoughts upon reading the book by Hubbard, Christman commented, "I was really looking for a higher state of consciousness and a way of helping people. And I read Dianetics and I felt "Wow this is it!" You know, "I can help people go clear." She hitchhiked from Chicago to Los Angeles in 1969 to study Scientology. Her first course in Scientology cost $35.00. Christman was quoted with a positive comment about Scientology in the 1992 edition of the Church of Scientology International-produced book What is Scientology?. She stated in the book, "I find life just gets better and better." Christman has a son.

== Scientology ==
=== Rise within organization ===
In 1972, Christman joined the division of Scientology called the Sea Org, a core group of the organization's staff. 3 News characterised the Sea Org as "Scientology's senior management". In their book Cults and New Religions, Douglas E. Cowan and David G. Bromley describe the Sea Org writing, "Described by the Church as 'a fraternal religious order,' members of the Sea Org 'occupy the most essential and trusted positions in the senior churches in the Scientology hierarchy'." Rolling Stone notes, "Sea Org members staff all of the senior ecclesiastic positions in the church hierarchy". In 2010, there were 5,000 members in the Sea Org. Her Sea Org career was short lived; she was instructed to cease taking prescribed medication for her epilepsy, and as a result experienced multiple serious seizures. In one instance, two of her front teeth fell out after she had a fall caused by a seizure while in the bathroom. She recounted these incidents of seizures in an interview with CBS News, "So I started having grand mal seizures, and I was not even off the medicine. I was only off part of the medicine, and I started having very bad grand mal seizures." Christman recalled that her epilepsy was not recognized as a genuine medical condition by Scientology; whose practice was to instruct members to attempt self-treatment, specifically completing the Purification Rundown, a controversial detoxification program that utilizes saunas and vitamins.

After a few months, she was finally convinced by her mother to resume taking her medication, even though this meant expulsion from the Sea Org. She remained a member of the church.

After being a member of the Scientology organization for ten years, Christman reached the spiritual "Operating Thetan" level of OT III. She recounted her experience of reading the Xenu story upon reaching the level of OT III: "You've jumped through all these hoops just to get to it, and then you open that packet, and the first thing you think is, 'Come on.'" She explained, "You're surrounded by all these people who're going, 'Wow, isn't it amazing, just getting the data? I can tell it has really changed you.' After a while, enough people say it and you're like, 'Wow. You know, I really feel it.'"

While a member of the organization, Christman rose to the Operating Thetan level of OT VII, "the near-pinnacle of enlightenment", and second-highest level within the movement. She worked for a time in one of the organization's Celebrity Centres, and became acquainted with celebrity members including John Travolta and Kelly Preston. She became an ordained minister within Scientology, and in this role trained new recruits to the organization, including Travolta. She trained Travolta on the "Hubbard Qualified Scientologist" course, the second Scientology class after the initial communication course. Christman spent time working at Narconon International, a group affiliated with Scientology and promoted as a drug rehabilitation program using methods created by Hubbard. She later came to realize that Narconon was a recruitment arm for Scientology, "Narconon's orders come from the Church of Scientology's senior management. Their programs, policies – it's all church policy. There's no question about this to anyone involved. ... At Narconon [they are] handling drugs in society. But in truth, it's to 'safe point the environment' – a goodwill gesture so they can recruit people."

According to Rolling Stone, Christman became a "high-ranking Scientologist" during her time in Scientology. She had difficulty progressing higher than OT VII within the organization, in part due to her epilepsy.

=== Office of Special Affairs ===
"I was in a cult. Scientology promotes not watching the news. It keeps you inside a Truman Show where you're totally unaware of things. It's like your own thinking gets shut down and you get used to not considering anything that might be critical of Scientology."

— Christman reflecting in 2001 upon her experiences assisting Office of Special Affairs agents

Christman worked with the Office of Special Affairs (OSA), a department in Scientology, in her efforts to curtail or remove material critical of Scientology from the press, media, and the Internet. She spent a total of 20 years working for OSA while a member of the Scientology organization. OSA agents serve as the "internal security force and intelligence unit" within Scientology. Christman assisted OSA agents in 1979, when a politician in Clearwater, Florida was attempting to hinder the Scientology organization's efforts to establish a presence in the city. She was ordered to participate in public meetings, and divert the focus of these events to questioning of the politician, Richard Tenning. He was defeated in a subsequent election, and the Scientology organization proceeded to increase its activities in Clearwater. In 1985, Christman helped OSA agents during a lawsuit filed by a former Scientology member. She attended the court proceedings and wrote reports about members of the jury, and assisted Scientology lawyers in compiling profiles of the jurors. At the time, Christman was an ardent believer in the Scientology organization and did not question the activities of the OSA agents. Reflecting back on her experiences assisting OSA agents, she commented, "I was in a cult. Scientology promotes not watching the news. It keeps you inside a Truman Show where you're totally unaware of things. It's like your own thinking gets shut down and you get used to not considering anything that might be critical of Scientology."

In 1998, the Scientology organization publicized an initiative to hand out software on CDs to all its members, which would help them create their own websites describing their activity in the movement, and linking back to the main site at www.scientology.org. The Scientology organization did not reveal to these individuals that the CD was simultaneously bundled with censorship software which blocked websites critical of the organization. This censorship software was termed, "Scieno Sitter" by critics of the organization. Janet Weiland, vice-president of OSA, has stated that it remains Scientologists' personal choice whether to use the filter, it is installed to protect them and their family members from encountering online harassment, and some Scientologists have choose to surf the Internet without filtering. OSA agents wished for Christman to specifically monitor critical websites and report to the organization about her findings, so they removed the Scieno Sitter censorship software from the computer at her residence in 1999, allowing her to research sites online freely. She came across the Scientology critic website Operation Clambake, managed by Andreas Heldal-Lund.

Christman reported directly to Weiland about her efforts to remove criticism of Scientology from the media and online and assisted in dealing with public relations for Scientology. Within the organization, negative publicity in the media was referred to as "Black PR". In 2000, Christman was in charge of the Scientology Parishioners League (SPL), a division formed by volunteers on orders from Weiland in order to respond rapidly to incidents of critical coverage of Scientology in the press. Weiland recruited Christman to the SPL in 1999. She would receive instruction from OSA agents, and proceed to complain to journalists and television producers in an attempt to convince them to pull a critical segment on Scientology. The A&E Network produced a special television program analyzing cults, and the SPL complained to the network and attempted to have Scientology removed from coverage in the program, asserting, "Scientology isn't a cult."

Christman was tasked with refuting facts posted on the Internet about the organization. During her time working with OSA, she observed, "The guys I worked with posted every day all day. It was like a machine. I worked with someone who used five separate computers, five separate anonymous identities ... to refute any facts from the Internet about the Church of Scientology." She acknowledged that she set up multiple identities for this purpose online, "I was in charge of setting up phony accounts on the Internet that were designed to shut down free speech by blocking out opponents' sites or trick-routing people to pro-Scientology sites when they were looking for opposing information."

Audio of Tory Christman discussing Office of Special Affairs operations against criticism of Scientology on the Internet, and her views on freedom of speech (April 2008)

She was assigned to try to stop the MTV Movie Awards from featuring a South Park satire, which poked fun at Scientology and the film, based on a book by its founder L. Ron Hubbard, titled Battlefield Earth. Christman repeatedly called the New York City office of MTV in an attempt to get them to stop the satire from airing. In the eventual broadcast, which ran June 8, 2000, the South Park character Cartman was shown using a Scientology personality test as toilet paper. Christman believed she had succeeded in her mission, for she thought that her efforts prevented the book Dianetics from being used by Cartman, instead of the personality test.

After the perceived success of her South Park assignment, OSA agents instructed Christman to deal with Scientology critics who congregated on the Internet. Her initial activities focused on a Warner Bros.-operated bulletin board which focused on Battlefield Earth, and she subsequently progressed to posting on the newsgroup alt.religion.scientology (ARS). In 2000, ARS functioned as a community of individuals whose efforts included posting material which reflected negatively on the Scientology organization. Christman took the screen name of "Magoo". From her Burbank, California residence in 2000, Christman posted numerous attacks on Scientology critics that were active on ARS. She worked to become the most frequent poster on the newsgroup by July 2000. Scientology critics on ARS were mystified as to the identity of the individual behind the Magoo handle, and posited that it was either a collective of OSA agents, or David Miscavige himself, the leader of Scientology management.

=== Decision to leave ===
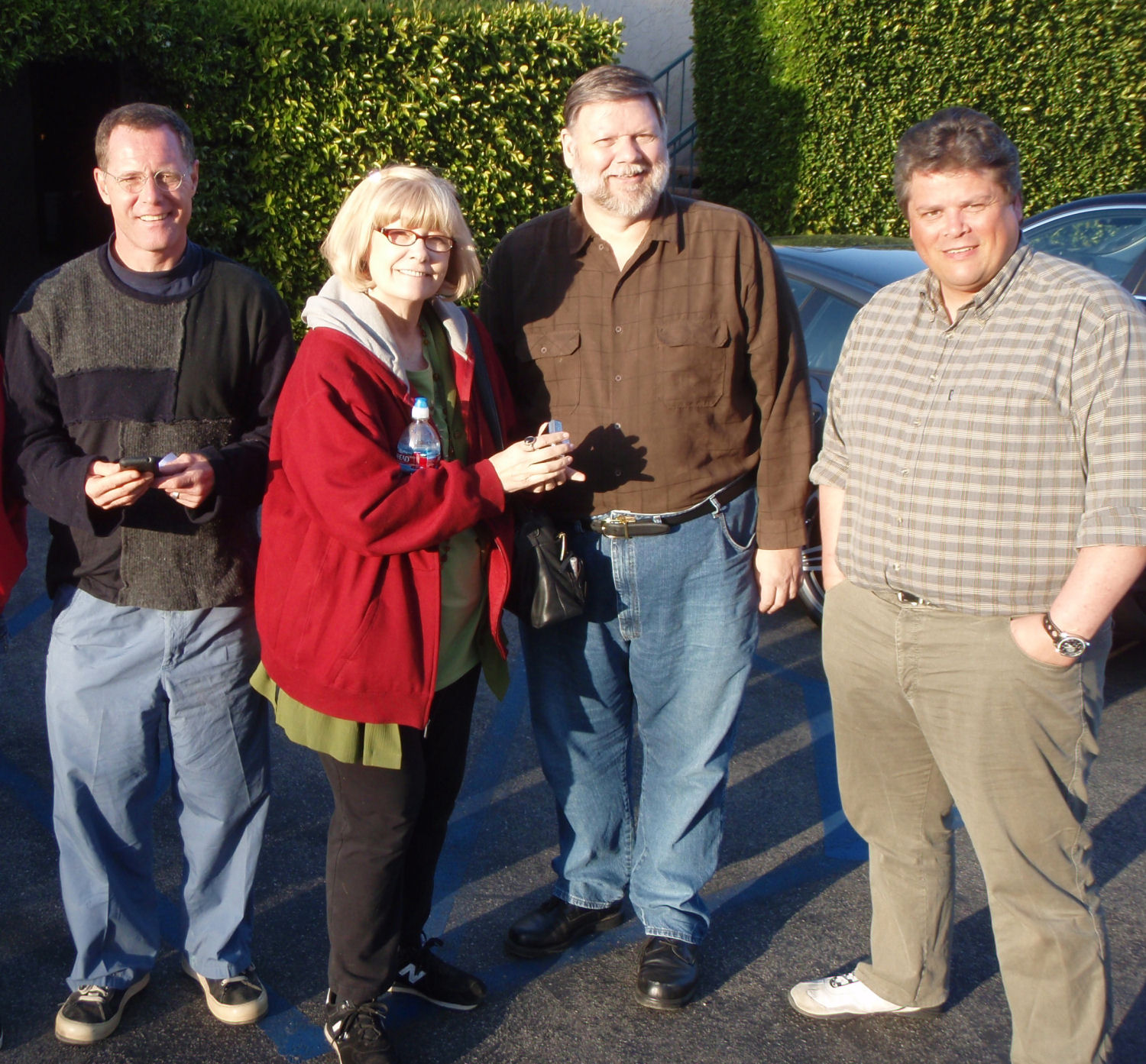
Actor Jason Beghe, Tory Christman, Mark Bunker, and Andreas Heldal-Lund (March 2008)

During this period of time in her efforts on behalf of the OSA agents, Christman felt conflicted in her activities, because she supported freedom of speech and she felt her activities constituted censorship. The operator of Xenu.net, Andreas Heldal-Lund, saw Christman's posts on ARS and reached out to her via email on July 14, 2000. The two engaged in communication, and Heldal-Lund explained to Christman his motivation for managing the Operation Clambake site. Christman identified with Heldal-Lund's ideals of free speech, and on July 20, 2000, she announced her intention to leave Scientology in a public post to ARS. She realized she would face repercussions from the organization for her actions, and asked Heldal-Lund for help; he recommended she contact a group of protesters against Scientology called the Lisa McPherson Trust (LMT) who were based in Clearwater. The LMT was started by Robert Minton and former Scientologists to highlight the controversial death of Scientology member, Lisa McPherson.

Through the Scientology practice of "disconnection", Christman's husband and the majority of her acquaintances and friends who were Scientologists at the time of her exit from the group excommunicated her and cut off contact. Christman recounted how after leaving the organization, the Church of Scientology attempted to damage her reputation through a policy referred to as "dead agenting". According to Christman, the Scientology organization publicized inaccurate information about her online, tried to get her removed from her position of employment, and filed a lawsuit related to her protesting against the group on church property. Then Scientology-spokesperson and now former Scientologist, Mike Rinder, called her a "wacko" and rejected her assertions as "absolute bullshit".

Christman contacted the Scientology critics based in Clearwater, and arranged flight transportation to Florida. She arrived at the airport in California to find that her flight was cancelled. Her former supervisor, Weiland, was waiting for her close to the ticket counter, and tried to convince her to remain in the organization. Christman eventually got on a flight to Tampa, Florida, but at the gate when she arrived was met by agents of Scientology. Tampa police were notified, and escorted Christman safely away from the Scientologists. While a member of Scientology, Christman had given over $1 million to the organization; she used her inheritance money to pay for coursework. She commented to the St. Petersburg Times of Florida about the thought process she underwent after leaving the organization, "When you get out and you get the whole thing, you're like, 'What was I thinking?'. I know the people inside are brainwashed and they are laughing at me. But to me, the truth is, I'm free. I can do what I want. I can say what I want."

=== Public criticism ===
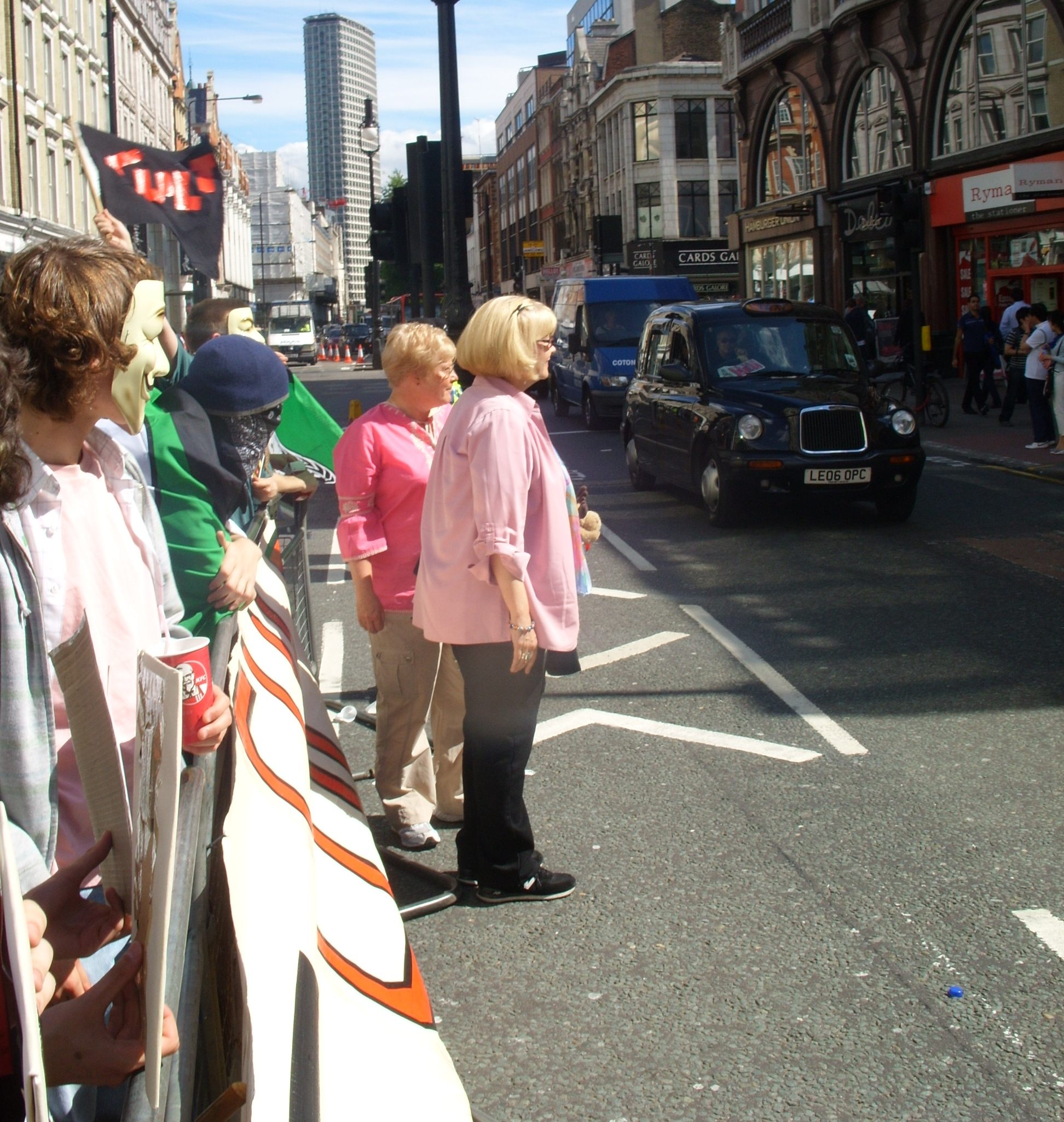
Christman at protest by Project Chanology in London (July 2008)

Shortly after leaving the organization, Christman began protesting in Florida against Scientology with members of the LMT. She picketed with signs outside of the organization's Fort Harrison Hotel in Clearwater. Scientology representatives in Clearwater complained to police in November 2000 about the picketing, and Christman and Minton were fined US$100. On February 21, 2001, Judge Thomas E. Penick dismissed other charges in the case, and criticized Scientology for its treatment of critics, commenting, "I'm missing the point here. I hope someone will let us know when the great invasion is coming." This experience was a defining period for Christman, as she was concerned that her former church would attempt to characterize her as a criminal. She maintained that the actions by representatives of Scientology against her were examples of the policy, "fair game"; a form of retribution for criticizing the organization.

In 2008, Christman was engaged in traveling around the world lecturing about Scientology and gave media interviews about the subject. In his 2008 book Tom Cruise: An Unauthorized Biography, author Andrew Morton thanked Christman in the acknowledgements section for advising him with regard to the jargon and complicated history of Scientology. In February 2008, Christman appeared on the National Public Radio program Morning Edition in a piece about the protest movement against Scientology called Project Chanology started by the Internet-based group Anonymous; she said she objected to any illegal methods used, but appreciated new activists taking part in criticizing Scientology. Along with Scientology critic Mark Bunker, she took part in the international protests against the organization in 2008 as part of Project Chanology.

Christman maintains an account on YouTube with the identification "ToryMagoo44", where she posts topically about Scientology. In April 2008, Christman’s YouTube account was briefly suspended, coinciding with a suspension of Bunker’s channel. Shortly thereafter, an anonymous user on the newsgroup alt.religion.scientology claimed responsibility for "silencing" her. Christman resided in Los Angeles in 2009. The Sunday Times characterized Christman in a 2009 article as "a fierce critic of the church".

== See also ==
- List of Guardian's Office operations
- Scientology controversies
- Scientology and the legal system
- Scientology versus the Internet
