= The Bridge (2006 drama film) =

- Directed by: Brett Hanover
- Written by: Brett Hanover
- Produced by: Tom Padgett
- Starring: Carole Smith; Bill Baker; Tom Padgett
- Release date: September 10, 2006
- Running time: 69 minutes
- Country: United States
- Language: English

The Bridge is a 2006 drama film directed by filmmaker Brett Hanover.

A fictional story of involvement and disillusionment with Scientology, the film explicitly uses Scientology terms throughout, as well as including clips from actual Scientology promotional and training videos. It was released as free use media to the Internet in September 2006 by the filmmaker.

The brochure of the Indie Memphis film festival stated that The Bridge was the "first feature film" about the Church of Scientology. While it is set against the background of the Church of Scientology and the Sea Org, the characters and situations depicted are fictional.

== Plot ==
Sea Org officer Ronnie Miscavige describes the planetary Scientology dissemination campaign. After the title sequence, Scientologist Diane Wheat (Carole Smith) is seen in an auditing session with the head of her local church, Robert Solomon (Bill Baker). Diane describes her trouble with finances and having her car repossessed. The next day Robert has Diane model her financial difficulties in clay. She is worried that her other financial obligations keep her from moving up Scientology's Bridge to Total Freedom. Robert tells her that she can work at the church in exchange for services to move up the Bridge.

Parallel to these events, Richard Grey (Tom Padgett) is trying to contact his daughter Amy at the Flag Land Base in Clearwater. Church employees refuse to allow him to speak to her because, unbeknownst to him, he has been declared a suppressive person. He arrives at the local church on Saturday seeking more information. Diane, who is working as a receptionist, hands him a copy of the ethics order declaring him a suppressive person, and he leaves.

The next day, Diane is working at the church again when two teenage girls arrive. The girls have seen the South Park episode "Trapped in the Closet" and want to attend a service for their own amusement. Diane tells them that the church does not have Sunday services, and shows them a promotional film for Dianetics instead. At home, Richard is reading the Operation Clambake and Lermanet.com web sites when he receives a panicked instant message from a friend. The friend tells him to watch a news report from Clearwater, and he learns that Amy has died after falling from the Fort Harrison Hotel. Shortly afterward, Robert calls Richard and informs him that he may not attend the funeral because Amy and her mother have disconnected from him.

At a celebration of L. Ron Hubbard's birthday, Robert announces that Diane has attained the state of Clear and gives her a Clear bracelet. After the celebration, he takes the bracelet away (but reminds her that she may purchase one of her own as they are not free) and shows her a film that encourages her to continue on the Bridge by taking the Operating Thetan courses at Flag. Late in the night, while she is cleaning, a distraught Richard comes by and asks if he can talk to anyone about being allowed into the funeral service. She refuses, but Richard insists on dropping off some old Scientology books and tapes that used to belong to Amy. Diane listens to one of Amy's cassettes from the high–level Clearwater Scientology center and hears a man's voice speaking scoldingly about being "willing to talk to the auditor", in an impenetrable jargon laden with nonsense words.

In the final act, protesters are seen outside the church loudly picketing over the death of Amy. When Diane walks out to confront them, they ask her to step outside the church gate and proceed to tell her the story of Xenu and the Wall of Fire from Operating Thetan level 3 (OT III). Robert notices Diane outside the church, tells her to go back inside, and threatens the protesters, but not before they have finished telling her the story. Once Diane is back inside, Robert runs her on a security check to determine whether she has any doubts or ill will toward Scientology.

Richard calls Amy's mother, who is still in Scientology and asks to be allowed at the funeral. She refuses and ends the call to avoid being sent to ethics. In the evening, Robert reminds Diane of the need to continue up the Bridge, and mentions the Wall of Fire at OT III. That night, disillusioned after returning to a room which earlier she was prevented from entering (being told it is a fully furnished office for the return of L. Ron Hubbard) and discovering it is merely a closet, Diane walks out the door of the church and leaves Scientology. The film ends with a written dedication: "For all who speak out — for those who have been silenced."

== Cast ==
- Bill Baker as Scientology leader
- Nathan Berry as second Protester
- Adam Craycroft as Protester
- Brian Forrest as Micah D. Greenstein
- Diana Heaton as Amy Grey
- Ron Miscavige, Jr. as himself, archival footage
- Tom Padgett as Richard Grey – father
- Paulette Regan as Richard's Ex–wife
- Linley Schmidt as Newscaster
- Carole Smith as Diane Wheat

== Production ==
The film was produced and directed by Brett Hanover, a native of Memphis, Tennessee. At the time of the film's release, Hanover was an 18-year-old student. His studies in college focused on film. Former Scientologists were involved in the production of the film; in addition to critics of Scientology associated with Operation Clambake.^{[B]} Hanover noted the film was an original script which he wrote along with his assistant director. They wrote the script prior to eliciting input from others. Prominent critics of Scientology later assisted with funding, input, and acting roles in the film. The film production took place in Tennessee. Hanover filmed The Bridge over a total period of six days, for a production budget of US$600.00.

== Distribution ==
The Bridge premiered at the Operation Clambake 10-year anniversary in Stavanger, Norway on September 2, 2006. Operation Clambake stated of the premiere, "We are especially excited for the movie 'The Bridge' ... The world premiere in Stavanger is a great honor". It was shown at the 9th annual Indie Memphis Film Festival in October 2006, as a feature presentation.

Hanover released copies of the film in 2006, to Google Video and Internet Archive. The film credits stated: "The Bridge' is licensed as royalty–free digital media, and may be distributed online for personal viewing without permission. All offline distribution rights are reserved by Brett Hanover."

== Director requests removal of film from Internet ==
Jeannette Walls reported in an MSNBC entertainment column that the film had been removed from the Internet. MSNBC quoted journalist and scientology critic Mark Bunker,^{[A]}^{[B]} who stated, "It appears that Scientology has hired investigators to dig up dirt on Brett Hanover to shudder him into silence. They have succeeded." In a case study on fair use, Jackson West of NewTeeVee cited the removal of the film from the Internet as an example of "a worst–case scenario of inappropriate behavior by a wealthy rightsholder toward work critical of that rightsholder".

A few weeks after the film's release to the Internet, Hanover requested its removal, stating on his website, "due to copyright issues, I ask that this film be withdrawn from circulation ... Do not contact me concerning this film, I am no longer supporting it." This statement itself by Hanover and all references to the film were subsequently removed from his website. The Internet Archive removed the film from its site, stating there were rights issues involved; YouTube and Google also removed copies of the film from their websites, but the film has since been reposted by other users, and has not been removed again.

== Reception ==
Cory Doctorow reviewed the film for Boing Boing, and commented, "It's not a bad movie — it moves a little slow, some of the dialog is stilted, but not bad for an indie feature shot in five days, and the information about the Church jibes with my own research into its practices." Chris Davis of Memphis Flyer wrote, "This locally produced feature directed by Brett Hanover uses materials created by the Church of Scientology and stories told by former members of L. Ron Hubbard's controversial sci–fi religion to build a tragic narrative about misplaced faith and insidious fraud. Scientologists will hate it. People who hate Scientologists won't like it nearly as much as the Tom Cruise episode of South Park." The Commercial Appeal characterized the film as a "fact–based dramatization of life inside the Church of Scientology".

Journalist and Scientology critic Mark Bunker observed, "It took a lot of courage to make the movie and a lot of talent to make it a good movie." Allmovie classified the production as a feature film "Religious Drama", involving themes of "Cons and Scams". Jackson West of NewTeeVee commented, "the production value is minimal and the structure episodic, making for a somewhat wooden narrative. But the premise and script were helped by efforts from former Scientologists and anti-cultists to craft an allegorical critique of the Church of Scientology." American skeptic and activist freethinker, Jim Lippard, recommended the film stating, "Watch it, it's pretty well done."

== See also ==
- List of American films of 2006
- The Profit
- The Bridge to Total Freedom
- Scientology in popular culture
- Scieno Sitter

== Endnotes ==
^^{[A]} Mark Bunker won an Emmy Award in 2006 from the Pacific Southwest Emmy Awards division of the National Academy of Television Arts and Sciences.
^^{[B]} The Bridge director and producer, Brett Hanover, designated websites Xenu.net and Xenutv.com as "official sources for information" about the film.
