= Scieno Sitter =

Content-control software

Scieno Sitter is content-control software that, when installed on a computer, blocks certain websites critical of Scientology from being viewed. The software was released by the Church of Scientology in 1998 for Church members using Windows 95. The term "Scieno Sitter" was coined by critics of Scientology who assert that the program is a form of Internet censorship.

== Background ==
The program was started in the late summer of 1998. Scientologists were mailed software on CDs, and told that the program would help members build Web sites which would then link to Scientology's main site. However, recipients of the program were not told that it also had a censorship program, which blocked critical sites from being viewed on the user's computer, if the sites were deemed dangerous. Critics of Scientology have referred to the program as "cult mind-control for the 21st century", and asserted that it stifles freedom of speech. One software developer stated that though he thought spam filters in general were a good idea, he found it "disturbing" that "a huge number of the terms that are banned are completely unrelated to the stated goals."

However, a vice president of the Office of Special Affairs branch of Scientology stated that Scientologists "make a personal choice" on whether or not to use the filtering software. A different spokesperson claimed that members of Scientology asked for the software, stating: "many of our parishioners want to use the Internet but asked for a filter protection from those elements that have sought to twist and pervert the religion." The packaging on the CD mailed to users who specifically request the filter states:

By popular demand from Scientologists, a program has been developed to prevent you from being subjected to 'entheta' and hate mail on the Internet. This filter allows you direct access to our sites rapidly, without being dev-t'd [distracted] by vilifying material, forgeries, and hate messages. In this fashion your attention can remain focused on dissemination and setting people's feet on the Bridge to Total Freedom.

== Functionality ==
In order to gain access to the software, the Scientologists must first sign a contract. Section 7 of this contract states that the members must agree to:

use the specific Internet Filter Program that CSI has provided to you which allows you freedom to view other sites on Dianetics, Scientology or its principals without threat of accessing sites deemed to be using the Marks or Works in an unauthorized fashion or deemed to be improper or discreditable to the Scientology religion.

The program works by preventing the user from accessing sites with certain keywords which Scientology has identified as being objectionable material for viewing by their members. This use of keywords functions as a way to prevent members from learning of guarded Scientology doctrine, such as Xenu, OT III, and other material relating to Space opera in Scientology scripture. Other keywords on notable topics which are blocked by the program include the names of several notable critics of Scientology, including Robert Vaughn Young and Keith Henson, as well as several hundred other frequent participants in the alt.religion.scientology newsgroup, together with terms like suppressive person, and Lisa McPherson.

This screening process is not limited to the viewing of Web sites, however. It also blocks users from discussing these forbidden keywords on chat programs such as Internet Relay Chat. Once these keywords are mentioned or certain individuals identified as undesirable enter the chat room, the user will be kicked off the discussion. When Tory Christman worked as an operative for OSA, other OSA operatives removed the program from her computer to allow her to analyze what critical material was being spread on the internet about Scientology. Some time after the software was removed, Christman encountered the Operation Clambake Web site and had online discussions with its operator Andreas Heldal-Lund, which eventually led to her leaving Scientology through a public announcement on Alt.religion.scientology.

== Media reports ==
In December 1998, the software was discussed on the A&E Network program: Investigative Reports. The program showed a Web page from Operation Clambake which described the software in a piece entitled: "The Church of Scientology—afraid of the real world" and "CENSORS the Net for members!". Bob Minton was quoted in the report as stating: "Scientologists are given filtering software to allow them to go on the Internet, because they do not want Scientologists to be subjected to critical information."

== In film ==
In the 2006 film The Bridge, the Scientologist character Diane Wheat attempts to find more information on the internet through a Google search for the word "zeenu", and is then directed to a search for the word Xenu. The Operation Clambake Web site comes up first in the search results, but when Wheat attempts to view the site, a message appears on her computer stating: "The page you have requested has been identified as containing racist/hate-oriented material," with the Scientology symbol displayed in the left-hand side of the warning box.

== See also ==
- Scientology versus the Internet
- Internet censorship
- Content-control software
