= Scientology and the Internet =

- Part of Scientology controversies
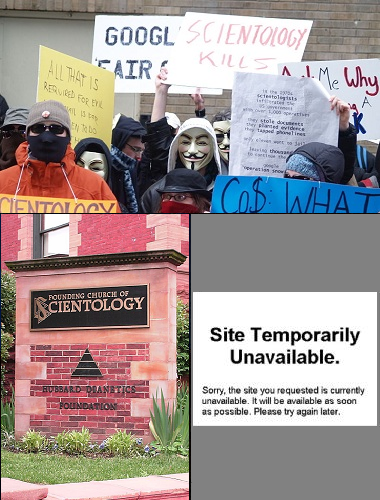
- Counterclockwise: Protest by Internet group Anonymous against the practices and tax status of the Church of Scientology; Monument-style sign in front of the Founding Church of Scientology in Washington DC; Screenshot of error message when attempting to load www.scientology.org on January 25, 2008
- Date: July 1994 – present
- Location: Internet, courts of law, worldwide protests
- Methods: litigation, spam, trolling, astroturfing, street protests, prank calls, black faxes, denial of service attacks
- Status: ongoing

Parties
alt.religion.scientology Anonymous; Operation Clambake; WikiLeaks XenuTV	Church of Scientology; Church of Scientology International; Scientology front groups various other associated entities

Lead figures
Andreas Heldal-Lund; Mark Bunker; Julian Assange	David Miscavige; Tom Cruise; John Travolta; Tommy Davis; Moxon & Kobrin

There are a number of disputes concerning the Church of Scientology's attempts to suppress material critical of Scientology and the organization on the Internet, utilizing various methods – primarily lawsuits and legal threats, as well as front organizations. In late 1994, the organization began using various legal tactics to stop distribution of unpublished documents written by L. Ron Hubbard. The organization has often been accused of barratry through the filing of SLAPP suits. The organization's response is that its litigious nature is solely to protect its copyrighted works and the unpublished status of certain documents.

Scholars, journalists, and court judgements characterise the organization as a confidence scam and say that these secretive writings are proof, or that they contain evidence that the organization's medical practices are illegal and fraudulent. Scientology has been convicted of fraud in the courts of several nations, although not those of the United States. Others have said that the organization is abusing copyright law by launching lawsuits against outspoken critics.

== Overview ==
Scientology versus the internet was a phrase coined to describe the "war" that the Church of Scientology waged to try to remove their copyrighted materials and secret "advanced technology" from the internet, and to hinder, harass and punish those who used the internet to discuss Scientology and expose abuses. The efforts started in earnest in the 1990s and were effectively abandoned in the late-2000s. Former national spokesman for Scientology Robert Vaughn Young once said, "I am thankful I'm not having to face the Net. It's going to be to Scientology what Vietnam was to the US."

At first, Scientology operatives attempted to shut down the main online newsgroup about Scientology. Failing that, they tried to overpower it. When insider information started to appear in droves, the organization identified and focused on several key players, had their premises raided, and filed lawsuits against them. Their efforts to suppress speech about Scientology attracted the attention of Anonymous in 2008, who declared their own war against Scientology, called Project Chanology. And finally with the posting of virtually all Scientology materials online, including with WikiLeaks, internally Scientology conceded they had lost the war.

In 1994, Scientology official Mike Rinder was put on the case when the OT Levels appeared on the internet.

This was a huge flap. ... At the outset, it was unclear who was responsible, and all hands began a frantic effort to nail down the perpetrators. ... We tapped any scientologist who had computer expertise and engage a group of PIs to collect evidence. This was both high priority and highly confidential. ... [Five] people were identified as suspects, and lawsuits were filed against them. In February 1995, federal marshals raided their homes and seized their computers. ... The filing of these lawsuits was a strategic blunder. It set the fledgling internet on fire and activists began appearing from all over, vowing to destroy scientology and end its assault on 'free speech'. RTC launched a new — and virtual — assault that scientology has never recovered from: legal threats, lawsuits, and attempted criminal prosecutions proved to be no match for the anonymous worldwide information dissemination vehicle that was the ever-expanding internet. Scientology was losing the battle to keep the OT levels secret, ... databases proliferated containing all copyrighted works, all Hubbard lectures, and then internal scientology documents. ... we soon understood that we were under siege ... [our lawyers] sent out threats to every person who posted the materials, to the [ISPs], and even to the phone companies that gave access to the internet. But that resulted in more sites appearing. It was ultimately a hopeless war ... Eventually, even we had to admit we had lost. We were playing a never-ending game of Whac-A-Mole — virtually everything ever written by Hubbard or about Scientology has now been posted on the internet.

— Mike Rinder

According to Tony Ortega, in the 1970s it was easier for Scientology to make scandalous stories disappear. "With limited media outlets to target, Scientology could reasonably expect to control its reputation. Critics could be marginalized or drowned out." With the internet's popularity and mainstreaming, it is more difficult because "the Internet never forgets". Mark Ebner said that the internet was the undoing of Scientology, starting around 1996: "The Internet pulled back the curtain to find Hubbard bare, and caught the Office of Special Affairs with their pants down ... years later, Anonymous came to Cyber Town and strafed Scientology while they weren't looking." Dave Touretzky says the Internet still offers "a much-too-convenient source of truth that members turn to when they have doubts about their church".

== alt.religion.scientology ==
Scott Goehring set up the newsgroup alt.religion.scientology in 1991, partly as a joke, partly for the purpose of informing the public about Scientology. Debate over the pros and cons of Scientology waxed and waned on the newsgroup through the first three years of its existence, and flame wars flared up commonly, as they did on some other newsgroups.

The online battle is generally regarded as having begun with the arrival of Dennis Erlich to alt.religion.scientology in late July 1994. A former high-ranking official in the Scientology organization who had been personally affiliated with L. Ron Hubbard, he caused a number of regular participants in the newsgroup to take notice.

=== The Xenu revelation ===
On December 24, 1994, the first of a large number of anonymous messages was posted to alt.religion.scientology, containing the text of the "secret" writings of Scientology known as the OT Levels (OT stands for "Operating Thetan"). Included among these postings was OT III (Operating Thetan Level Three), which gave L. Ron Hubbard's description of the "Xenu story".

The Xenu story had been published in the Robert Kaufman book Inside Scientology: How I Joined Scientology and Became Superhuman in 1972, in The Philadelphia Inquirer in 1977, and several times in the 1980s in the Los Angeles Times; nevertheless, this action brought on the actions of lawyers representing Scientology, who contacted various newsgroup participants and posted warnings demanding that the unauthorized distribution of the OT writings cease. The lawyers described the documents as "copyrighted, trademarked, unpublished trade secrets", and the distribution of the materials as a violation of copyright law and trademark law.

The first postings of the OT documents were done through an anonymous remailer, and the identity of the person who made them available on the newsgroup was never discovered. However, Dennis Erlich posted replies to these messages on the newsgroup, and his replies contained the entire text of the original messages (including the disputed materials). Scientology's lawyers therefore approached him, declaring that Erlich had re-published the copyrighted works in his newsgroup messages. Erlich's reply to this was to deny their requests to remove his postings from the newsgroup.

=== Attempt to remove alt.religion.scientology ===
On January 11, 1995, Scientology lawyer Helena Kobrin attempted to shut down the Usenet discussion group alt.religion.scientology by sending a control message instructing Usenet servers to delete the group on the grounds that:

(1) It was started with a forged message; (2) not discussed on alt.config; (3) it has the name "scientology" in its title which is a trademark and is misleading, as a.r.s. is mainly used for flamers to attack the Scientology religion; (4) it has been and continues to be heavily abused with copyright and trade secret violations and serves no purpose other than condoning these illegal practices.

In practice, this rmgroup message had little effect, since most Usenet servers are configured to disregard such messages when applied to groups that receive substantial traffic, and newgroup messages were quickly issued for those servers that did not do so. However, the issuance of the message resulted in increased public criticism of Scientology by free-speech advocates.

== Raids and lawsuits ==
Shortly after the initial legal announcements and rmgroup attempt, representatives of Scientology followed through with a series of lawsuits against various participants on the newsgroup, including Dennis Erlich, in Religious Technology Center v. Netcom On-Line Communication Services, Inc.

The first raid took place on February 13, 1995. Accompanied by Scientology lawyers, federal marshals made several raids on the homes of individuals who were accused of posting Scientology's copyrighted materials to the newsgroup. Raids took place against Arnaldo Lerma in Virginia, Lawrence A. Wollersheim and Robert Penny of FACTNet in Colorado, and Dennis Erlich in California. Internationally, raids took place against Karin Spaink in The Netherlands and Zenon Panoussis in Sweden.

In addition to filing lawsuits against individuals, Scientology also sued The Washington Post for reprinting one paragraph of the OT writings in a newspaper article, as well as several Internet service providers, including Netcom, Tom Klemesrud, and XS4ALL. It also regularly demanded the deletion of material from the Deja News archive.

Participants in alt.religion.scientology began using quotes from OT III in particular to publicize the online battle over the secret documents. The story of Xenu was subsequently quoted in many publications, including news reports on CNN and 60 Minutes. It became the most famous reference to the OT levels, to the point where many Internet users who were not intimately familiar with Scientology had heard the story of Xenu, and immediately associated the name with Scientology. The initial strikes against Scientology's critics settled down into a series of legal battles that raged through the courts. The Electronic Frontier Foundation provided legal assistance to defendant Tom Klemesrud and his attorney Richard Horning helped find Dennis Erlich pro bono defense. Daily reports of the latest happenings were posted to alt.religion.scientology.

In the wake of the Scientologists actions, the Penet remailer, which had been the most popular anonymous remailer in the world until the Scientology "war" took place, was shut down. Johan Helsingius, operator of the remailer, stated that the legal protections afforded him in his country (Finland) were too thin to protect the anonymity of his users and he decided to close down the remailer as a result.

== Scientology's online campaign ==
After failing to remove the newsgroup, Scientologists adopted a strategy of newsgroup spam and intimidation. Scientologists hired third parties to regularly flood the newsgroup with pro-scientology messages, vague anti-scientology messages, irrelevant comments, and accusations that other posters are secret Scientologists intent on tracking and punishing posters. This makes the newsgroup virtually unreadable via online readers such as Google Groups, although more specialized newsreading software that can filter out all messages by specific "high noise" posters make the newsgroup more usable.

While legal battles were being fought in the courts, an equally intense and aggressive campaign was waged online. The newsgroup alt.religion.scientology found itself at the heart of an electronic maelstrom of information and disinformation, as the newsgroup itself was attacked both literally and figuratively. Tens of thousands of junk messages were spammed onto the newsgroup, rendering it nearly unreadable at times when the message "floods" were at their peaks. Over one million sporgery articles were injected into the newsgroup by Scientology management and staff; former Scientology staff member Tory Christman has spoken at length about her involvement in these attacks. Lawyers representing the Church of Scientology made public appeals to Internet service providers to remove the newsgroup completely from their news servers. Furthermore, anonymous participants in the newsgroup kept up a steady stream of flame wars and off-topic arguments. Participants on the newsgroup accused Scientology of organising these electronic attacks, though the organization consistently denied any wrongdoing.

In the early days of the World Wide Web, groups associated with Scientology employed a similar strategy to make finding websites critical of the organization more difficult. Scientology employed Web designers to write thousands of Web pages for their site, thus flooding early search engines. After the advent of modern search engines, this problem was solved by the innovation of clustering responses from the same Web server, so that no more than two results from any one site were shown.

Since 1995, Scientology has used copyright-infringement laws to prosecute critics posting controversial information about the organisation on the Web. The organization has been accused of employing not only legal pressure, but also blackmail and character assassination in an attempt to win many of the court cases in which it involves itself. On the other side of the battle, many Web-page developers have linked the words "Dianetics" and "Scientology" to Operation Clambake. This resulted in the anti-Scientology site having the highest Google index on the term for a while, which in turn resulted in Scientology persuading Google to remove links to the site until international outcry led to the links being restored. This might be considered an early example of a Google bomb, and has led to questions about the power and obligations of Internet search providers.

In the 1990s the Church of Scientology was distributing a special software package for its members to 'protect' them from "unapproved" material about the organization. The software was designed to completely block out the newsgroup alt.religion.scientology, various anti-Scientology web sites, and all references to various critics of Scientology. This software package was derided by critics, who accused the organization of censorship and called the program "Scieno Sitter", after the content-control software net-filter program Cyber Sitter. Since no updates have been reported since 1998 (and the original filter program only worked with Windows 95), the package is unlikely to be in use with recent operating systems and browsers due to software rot.

In June 2006, Scientology lawyers sent cease-and-desist letters to Max Goldberg, founder of the website YTMND, asking him to take down all sites that either talked about or mocked Scientology, which had recently become a fad on the site following a popular South Park episode. Goldberg responded by stating that the "claims are completely groundless and I'm not removing anything," adding to the members of the site, "it should only be a matter of time before we're sued out of existence." In response, YTMNDers created yet more sites about Scientology; these were highlighted on the main page. They also campaigned to Google bomb "The Unfunny Truth About Scientology" site. No legal action was taken against YTMND or Goldberg.

In August 2007, MSNBC quoted Associated Press, in an article on the Wikipedia Scanner, that computers owned by the Church of Scientology had been removing criticism in the Scientology entry on Wikipedia. A Fox News article also reported that Church of Scientology computers had been used to delete references to the relationship between Scientology and the Cult Awareness Network, in the article on the Cult Awareness Network on Wikipedia. In May 2009, the Wikipedia Arbitration Committee decided to restrict access to its site from Church of Scientology IP addresses, to prevent self-serving edits by Scientologists. A "host of anti-Scientologist editors" were topic-banned as well. The committee concluded that both sides had "gamed policy" and resorted to "battlefield tactics", with articles on living persons being the "worst casualties".

== Project Chanology ==
In early 2008, another protest against the Church of Scientology was organized by the Internet-based Anonymous, which originally consisted of users of the English speaking imageboard 4chan and forums such as Somethingawful.com, and several Internet Relay Chat channels, among other Internet-based communities claiming affiliation with Anonymous.

On January 14, 2008, a video produced by the Church of Scientology featuring an interview with Tom Cruise was leaked to the Internet and uploaded to YouTube. The Church of Scientology issued a copyright violation claim against YouTube requesting the removal of the video. In response to this, Anonymous formulated Project Chanology. Calling the action by the Church of Scientology a form of Internet censorship, members of Project Chanology organized a series of denial-of-service attacks against Scientology websites, prank calls, and black faxes to Scientology centers.

"Message to Scientology", January 21, 2008

On January 21, 2008, Anonymous announced its goals and intentions via a video posted to YouTube titled "Message to Scientology", and a press release declaring a "War on Scientology" against both the Church of Scientology and the Religious Technology Center. In the press release, the group states that the attacks against the organization will continue in order to protect the right to freedom of speech, and to end what they believe to be the financial exploitation of the organization's members. A new video "Call to Action" appeared on YouTube on January 28, 2008, calling for protests outside Church of Scientology centers on February 10, 2008.

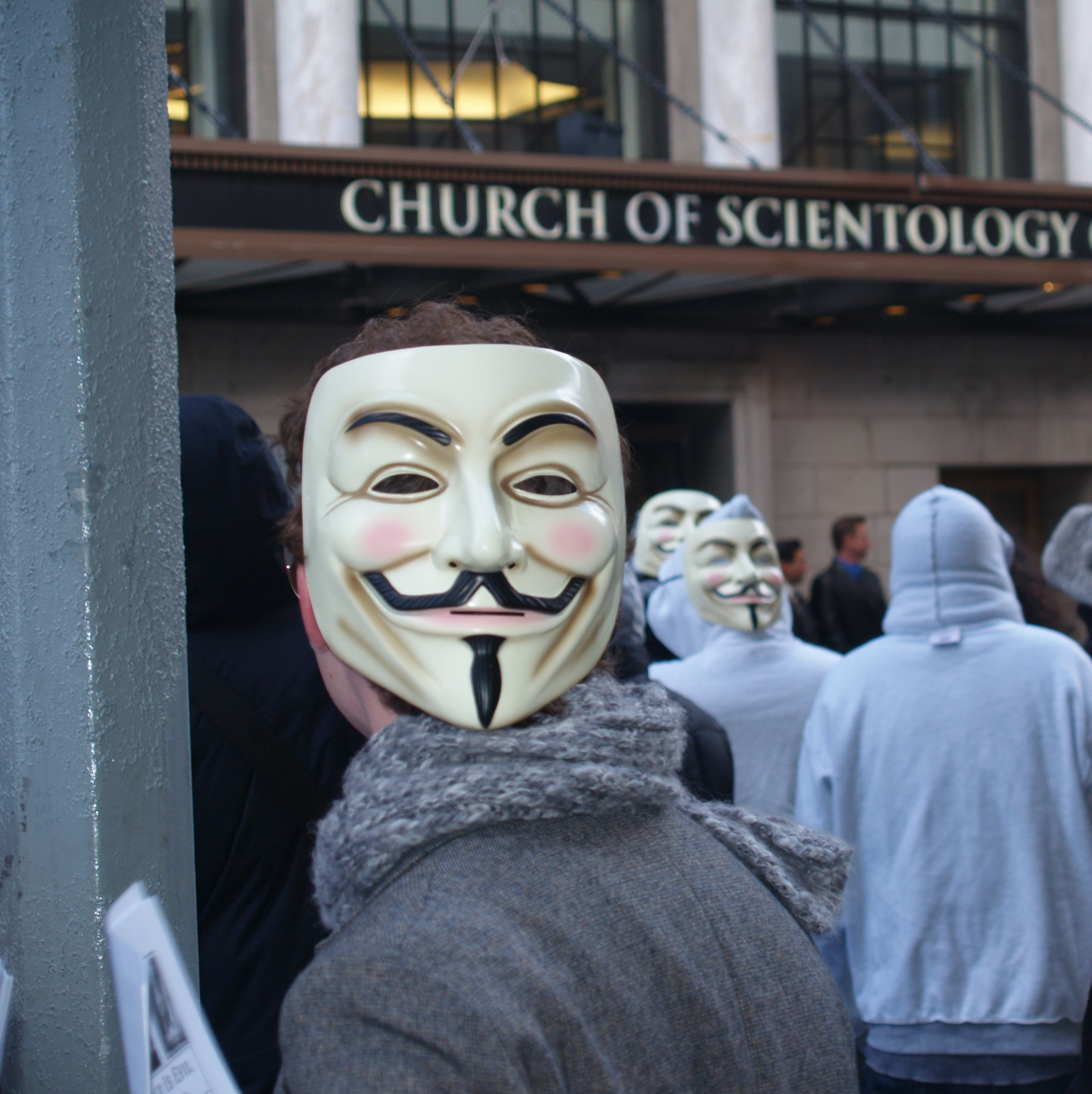
A member of the Internet group Anonymous which has held protests in many countries against the CoS every month since January 2008

On February 2, 2008, 150 people gathered outside of a Church of Scientology center in Orlando, Florida to hold a protest against the organization's practices. Small protests were also held in Santa Barbara, California, and Manchester, England. On February 10, 2008, about 7,000 people protested in more than 93 cities worldwide. Many protesters wore Guy Fawkes masks inspired by the character V from V for Vendetta, or otherwise disguised their identities, in part to protect themselves from reprisals from the organization. Anonymous held a second wave of protests on March 15, 2008, in cities all over the world, including New York, Chicago, Los Angeles, London, Paris, Vancouver, Toronto, Berlin, and Dublin. Anonymous held its third protest against Scientology on April 12, 2008. Named "Operation Reconnect", it aimed to increase awareness of the Church of Scientology's disconnection policy. A fourth protest occurred on May 10, 2008, and a fifth (Operation Sea Arrrgh) occurred on June 14, 2008.

== WikiLeaks ==
In March 2008, WikiLeaks published a 612-page Scientology manual on the eight Operating Thetan levels, considered secret by the Church of Scientology. Three weeks later, Wikileaks received a warning from the Church of Scientology that the manual was copyrighted and that its publication infringed intellectual-property rights. WikiLeaks refused to remove the material, and its operator released a statement saying that Scientology was a "cult" that "aids and abets a general climate of Western media self-censorship." A Church of Scientology International spokeswoman, writing to FOXNews.com, said: "I can only assume that religious bigotry and prejudice is driving their activity, as there is no altruistic value in posting our copyrighted scriptures, despite WikiLeaks' statements to the contrary. Posting entire books and hundreds of pages of published works is not 'Sunshine Policy' but wholesale copyright infringement." Julian Assange replied: "We thought it was a small issue, and our normal fare is government corruption and military secrets, so it seemed that this nutty religious organization was pretty inconsequential in terms of what we normally do. But after receiving these legal threats from them ... it was time for us to make a stand."

== Notable legal actions ==
A few of the court cases ended with rulings in favor of Scientology, though most of the cases were settled out of court. Many cases have been criticized as examples of malicious litigation and its members and lawyers have been indicted and fined for such actions. Noteworthy incidents in the later years of the online war included:

- Scientology's lawsuit against ex-member Arnaldo Lerma, his provider Digital Gateway, and The Washington Post. Lerma posted the Fishman Affidavit that contained 61 pages including the story of Xenu, a story simultaneously denied and claimed as a trade secret by the Church of Scientology.
- Zenon Panoussis, a resident of Sweden, was also sued for posting Scientology's copyrighted materials to the Internet. In his defense, he used a provision of the Constitution of Sweden that guarantees access to public documents. Panoussis turned over a copy of the NOTs documents to the office of the Swedish Parliament and, by law, copies of all documents (with few exceptions) received by authorities are available for anyone from the public to see, at any time he or she wishes. This, known as the Principle of Public Access (Offentlighetsprincipen), is considered a basic civil right in Sweden. The case, however, was decided against Panoussis. The results of his case sparked a legal firestorm in Sweden that debated the necessity of re-writing part of the Constitution.
- In 1995 Scientology caused a raid on the servers of Dutch Internet provider XS4ALL and sued it and Karin Spaink for copyright violations arising from published excerpts from confidential materials. There followed a summary judgment in 1995, full proceedings in 1999, an appeal in 2003 which has been upheld by the Supreme Court of Netherlands in December 2005, all in favor of the provider and Karin Spaink.
- Dennis Erlich and Scientology settled their lawsuits. Erlich withdrew from the online battle entirely, and all mention of him was removed from Church of Scientology material.
- Activist Keith Henson was sued for posting a portion of Scientology's writings to the Internet. Henson defended himself in court without a lawyer, while at the same time he carried out protests and pickets against Scientology. The court found that Henson had committed copyright infringement, and the damage award against Henson was $75,000, an amount which Scientology said was the largest damages ever awarded against an individual for copyright infringement. Henson's case became increasingly more complex and ongoing, with a misdemeanor conviction of interfering with religion in Riverside County, California. In his Internet writings, Henson said that he was forced to flee the United States and seek asylum in Canada due to ongoing threats against him.
- Scientology was one of the first organizations to make use of the Digital Millennium Copyright Act (DMCA). In June 1999, Scientology used the controversial law to force AT&T Worldnet to reveal the identity of a person who had been posting anonymously to alt.religion.scientology with the pseudonym of "Safe".
- In March 2001, legal threats from Scientology lawyers forced Slashdot to remove text from one of its discussion boards, after an excerpt from OT III was posted there. Slashdot noted this as the first time a comment had to be removed from its system due to copyright concerns, and retaliated by posting a list of links to anti-Scientology websites.
- The organization also used the DMCA to force the Google search engine to erase its entries on the controversial anti-Scientology Web site Operation Clambake in March 2002, though the entry was reinstated after Google received a large number of complaints from Internet users. The publicity stemming from this incident led Google to begin submitting DMCA takedown notices it received to the Chilling Effects archive, which archives legal threats of all sorts made against Internet users and Internet sites.
- In September 2002, lawyers for Scientology contacted Internet Archive (archive.org), the administrators of the Wayback Machine and asserted copyright claims on certain materials archived as historical contents of the Operation Clambake site. In response, the Wayback Machine administration removed the archive of the entire Clambake site, initially posting a false claim that the site's author had requested its removal. A search would return a "Blocked Site Error" from the Wayback archive. The claim has since been removed.

== See also ==
- Scientology speedrunning
- Streisand effect
