= Leipzig Human Rights Award =

German award

- Awarded for: "As our Charter and our name state, we are a transatlantic organization that focuses principally on human rights and religious freedom in the USA, and on the rise of organized totalitarianism."
- Location: Leipzig, Saxony
- Country: Germany
- Presented by: European-American Citizens Committee for Human Rights and Religious Freedom in the USA
- First award: 2000
- Final award: 2003
- Website: http://www.leipzig-award.org/englisch/index.html

The Leipzig Human Rights Award is an honor given by the European-American Citizens Committee for Human Rights and Religious Freedom in the USA, which recognizes "efforts towards human rights and freedom of expression in the USA" and actions against what the organization refers to as "human rights violations by the totalitarian Scientology." Prior to 2001, the honor was known as the Alternative Charlemagne Award.

Former Scientology critic Bob Minton received the first award in 2000. Other notable recipients of the award include former German Federal Minister of Labor Norbert Blüm, former Secretary of State of France, Alain Vivien and Operation Clambake founder Andreas Heldal-Lund. Psychologist Margaret Singer was selected at the 2003 ceremony to be the 2004 Award recipient, but she died shortly thereafter and no award was given in that year.

== History ==
=== Formation ===
Originally begun as the "Alternative Charlemagne Award," the honor was formed as a counterpoint to the Charlemagne Award given to U.S. President Bill Clinton in 2000. Presented in Aachen, Germany, the Charlemagne Award, or Karlspreis, "honors individuals who promote democracy, human rights and the common values of Europe." The original title of the Leipzig Human Rights Award was so-named as a way of criticizing the relationship between the Church of Scientology and the Clinton Administration, which granted Scientology tax exemption status during Clinton's term in office. The European-American Citizens Committee for Human Rights and Religious Freedom in the USA was formed in 1997, and includes committee members from Germany, the United States, England, Austria, Russia and Sweden. The Committee opposes "physical and psychological abuse of humans under the pretext of religion." The organization notes that their criticism of the United States for "its failure to confront Scientology’s human rights abuses while promoting the cult around the world" has made the Award controversial, and states that all past recipients of the Award have been targeted by the Church of Scientology as suppressive persons, and subjected to the Church's fair game policy. Award recipients do not receive financial compensation as part of the award.

The organization's charter cites its concern over the deaths of Lisa McPherson and Patrice Vic, and states "We wish to express our support for the American people and the American government in ending human rights violations against US citizens and other people, committed by the Scientology Organization." Specifically, the Leipzig Human Rights Award charter calls on the United States to reestablish "true freedom of life, speech, religion, personality and pursuit of happiness," and emphasizes freedom of speech, freedom for members of an organization to leave that organization without fear of retribution, freedom from blackmail through materials obtained during spiritual counseling, and calls on the United States for full disclosure of "secret agreements" between the Internal Revenue Service and the Church of Scientology.

=== Award recipients ===
Bob Minton, at the time a prominent critic of Scientology, received the first award in 2000 as the Alternative Charlemagne Award. In her speech at the event, Scientology Task Force of the Hamburg Interior Authority Commissioner Ursula Caberta cited Minton's recognition of "what dangers could arise for people and liberal democracy from Scientology." Minton had provided former members of Scientology with financial and legal assistance after they had left the organization. At the awards ceremony, Sect Commissioner of the Evangelical Church in Berlin-Brandenburg Thomas Gandow stated "By holding this ceremony, we intended to give a sign that, in spite of the Clinton administration, there are people in America who think differently and who do not swim with the Scientology tide." Gandow cited Minton's actions as chairman of the Lisa McPherson Trust helping former members of Scientology make claims against the organization in court. The Church of Scientology was critical of Minton being honored, and formed its own organization opposed to the Leipzig Human Rights Award, and on May 29, 2000 sent letters to bishops of the Evangelical State Churches in Berlin-Brandenburg and Saxony. The letter stated that Sect Commissioner Thomas Gandow should be dismissed, and said that the Saxon state church should "distance itself from the [Awards] procedure." In response, Gandow stated that Clinton had received the Charlemagne Award despite his affair with Monica Lewinsky. The awards ceremony took place at the old stock exchange in the Old City of Leipzig. The award given to Minton was presented as a sculpture of the St. Nicholas Church, Leipzig, and was created by Leipzig artist Ruediger Bartels. The award presentation was held on June 3, 2000, one day after the presentation of the official Charlemagne Award to President Bill Clinton by Aachen Mayor Jürgen Linden.

Former German Federal Minister of Labor Norbert Blüm was honored with the 2001 Leipzig Human Rights Award. Blüm was recognized because he had "championed human rights and religious freedom in the discussion with the totalitarian Scientology Organization." The Award again contained a picture of Leipzig's St. Nicholas Church, and Blüm was presented with the Award at a ceremony in Leipzig at a site near the Leipzig Trade Fair on June 10, 2001. In an interview with the junge Welt on June 11, 2001, Blüm was asked why it takes courage to be a politician critical of the Scientology, and he cited actions the Church of Scientology had taken against him: "Scientology acts on people's fears. For instance they threatened me by saying they would distribute their dossier on me to television. They've called me all kinds of names in their newspaper: the "Rasputin" of politics, for example." Blüm also stated in the interview that he did not support a ban on Scientology in Germany, but rather sought to foster the distribution of information about the organization. He also compared what he saw as totalitarian similarities between the ideologies of L. Ron Hubbard and Adolf Hitler, noting that he was not comparing the individuals themselves but rather their "totalitarian systems." At the awards presentation, Thomas Gandow stated that Blüm was the only federal minister to date to criticize Scientology's "new totalitarianism." Gandow noted that Blüm had been criticized by Scientologists in the press, and was sued in court for his actions critical of the organization. The Scientology Church Germany, Inc. characterized the Award as a "cynical mockery of the most elementary basic rights and of the East German civil rights movement," and referred to the Awards Committee as "a dubious clan of fanatical religious discriminators."

The European-American Citizens Committee for Human Rights and Religious Freedom in the USA recognized former Secretary of State of France, Alain Vivien, with the third Leipzig Human Rights Award, on May 11, 2002. The Award was again presented in Leipzig at St. Nicholas Church, and a congratulatory speech was given by Bavaria's Interior Minister, Guenther Beckstein. The Award was an image of the St. Nicholas Church, encased in glass. At the time, Vivien was the President of the Interministerial Mission for Monitoring and Combatting Cultic Deviances, a French government agency. The Committee gave Vivien recognition for his work against "new totalitarian organizations", and spoke positively of his motivations which included his "aim to protect society"; Vivien was singled out for his "demonstration of public courage" while undergoing what the Committee referred to as "pressure from a new form of totalitarianism exercised by Scientology". In his speech honoring Vivien, Minister Guenther Beckstein called Vivien a "pioneer in the Scientology controversy across Europe and across the world." Beckstein stated that Vivien's work demonstrated that it is possible to prevent the misuse of the word "religion" by totalitarian organizations. In his acceptance speech, Vivien stated he was pleased "to receive the award in a place from which freedom of thought has for so long emanated."

Operation Clambake founder Andreas Heldal-Lund became the fourth recipient of the Leipzig Human Rights Award, on May 17, 2003. Operation Clambake was cited by the Committee for exposing what it referred to as "fraud and human rights violations" of the Church of Scientology in the United States. The European-American Citizens Committee said it echoed a statement Heldal-Lund had written at the Operation Clambake website, where he stated: "People should be free to believe whatever they want, including Scientology," but also cited what he believed to be the organization's "deceitfulness, its lack of compassion for its members (especially the hard-working staff), its aggressive hard sell, its arrogance, its attack on free speech, its litigiousness, its harassment of its critics, its lack of concern for families, its gross neglect and abuse of children." Heldal-Lund was recognized for "maintaining his Web page despite repeated legal attacks from church officials." Church of Scientology officials had attempted to silence Heldal-Lund by requesting Google Inc. and Internet Archive remove links to Operation Clambake, claiming violation of their copyrights. The Awards ceremony again included the presentation of a glass-contained sculpture with an image of St. Nicholas Church. Alain Vivien presented Heldal-Lund with the Award, and stated that his work had revealed the actions of Scientologists with "respect and intelligence." In his acceptance speech, Heldal-Lund spoke about freedom of speech, and emphasized the role of the individual citizen.

After the 2003 Awards ceremony completed, the Committee met and selected Dr. Margaret Thaler Singer to receive the 2004 award. Singer died on November 23, 2003, and as a result no award was given out in 2004. The European-American Citizens Committee stated: "The Committee really had no choice but to not select another award recipient for 2004, because Margaret truly is irreplaceable. We also decided not to hold a celebration this year."

== See also ==
- List of religion-related awards
