= Operation Clambake =

Website and organization critical of Scientology

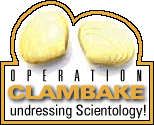
- Logo, Operation Clambake
- Website type: Scientology controversies
- Available in: English
- Owner: Andreas Heldal-Lund
- Website: xenu.net
- Commercial: No
- Launched: 1996

Operation Clambake, also referred to by its domain name, xenu.net, is a website that published criticism of the Church of Scientology. It was launched in 1996 by Norwegian Andreas Heldal-Lund, and maintained by him until his death in 2024. Operation Clambake has referred to the Church of Scientology as "a vicious and dangerous cult that masquerades as a religion". The website includes texts of petitions, news articles, exposés, and documents. The site has been ranked as high as the second spot in Google searches for the term "Scientology".

The term for the organization refers both to a traditional clam bake as well as the notion from L. Ron Hubbard's Scientology: A History of Man that humans follow a "genetic line" which includes clams, and that the psychological problems afflicting humans are impacted by past experiences. The domain name xenu.net is a reference to the character Xenu from secretive "OT III" Scientology documents.

In 1996, the site was one of the first locations on the internet to host secret Scientology documents pertaining to Xenu and OT III. Shortly thereafter, the Church of Scientology attempted to get this material removed from Operation Clambake, and other internet sites, through letters written by counsel and the Digital Millennium Copyright Act. After receiving a DMCA takedown notice, Google removed many Xenu.net pages from its indexes, which decreased the site's page rank in searches for "Scientology". The incident inspired vocal Internet users and groups to complain to Google, and links to the Clambake site were restored. Google subsequently began to contribute its notices to Chilling Effects, archiving the Scientology complaints and linking to the archive.

Operation Clambake has been consulted by news media organizations and other groups for information on Scientology and related organizations. Dateline NBC cited the organization in a 1998 investigative journalism piece, as have other publications including The Wall Street Journal, The New York Times and the Associated Press. During the Spring 2002 semester, Xenu.net was included as required reading in a New York University course on "Copyright and Censorship", and in 2003 webmaster Andreas Heldal-Lund received the 2003 Leipzig Human Rights Award by the European-American Citizens Committee for Human Rights and Religious Freedom in the US, an organization opposed to the Church of Scientology.

== Foundation ==
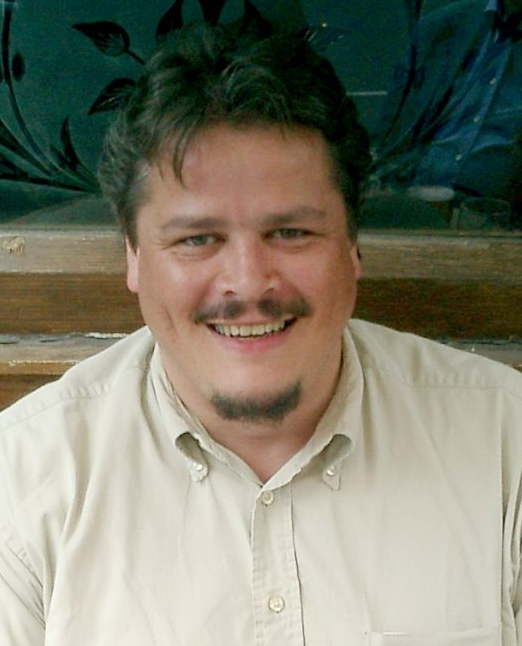
Andreas Heldal-Lund, founder of Operation Clambake

Operation Clambake was founded in 1996 by Andreas Heldal-Lund, an information technology manager in Stavanger, Norway, who administered the site at www.xenu.net. This domain name has been described as provocative, because it is seen by some as a caricature of the character Xenu from Scientology cosmogony. Operation Clambake is registered in Norway as a non-profit organization.

Heldal-Lund chose the name "Operation Clambake" for the organization as a reference to statements made by L. Ron Hubbard in which Hubbard wrote that the problems of human beings today are a result of traumatic events experienced by them as spiritual beings when they inhabited the bodies of clams during Earth's evolution. In Hubbard's Scientology: A History of Man, he asserts humans follow his notion of the "genetic line" of the "genetic entity", which include clams (as well as sloths, volcanoes, and a "sense of being eaten"), and certain human psychological problems descend from difficulties these clams experienced. Hubbard defined "genetic line" as a collection of the total "incidents" which occurred during the evolution of what Scientology refers to as the "MEST body".

== Conflict ==
=== OT III documents ===
Prior to its own direct conflict with the Church of Scientology, Operation Clambake had described on its site how Amazon.com had pulled Jon Atack's book A Piece of Blue Sky, a work critical of Scientology. The site later became one of the focal points of what some have termed "the war between Scientology and the Internet". On November 8, 1996, Operation Clambake was one of the first sites to host the secretive OT III documents describing the story of Xenu. Operation Clambake maintains the position that posting these internal Church of Scientology documents is permitted under "fair use" allowance of internationally recognized copyright law. The Church of Scientology threatened legal action against various Internet service providers that host the site, demanding it be removed from the Internet for hosting information copyrighted by the Church of Scientology.

In 1998 Salon reported that Scientologists were now blocked from viewing sites critical of Scientology including Operation Clambake and alt.religion.scientology, through the use of a content-control software program referred to by critics as Scieno Sitter. The Church of Scientology was unable to shut down Operation Clambake's internet service provider in Norway. The organization succeeded in shutting down the upstream connection to the site's internet service provider, Netherlands-based Xtended Internet. In November 2002, Xtended Internet's upstream provider, Cignal Global Communications received a letter from Church of Scientology counsel alleging copyright and trademark infringement involved with Xenu.net. This letter led to Cignal Global Communications, a United States–based company, terminating its service with Xtended Internet, which had to move their company to a new backbone provider.

=== DMCA and Google delisting ===
In various incidents documented in such publications as The New York Times, Slashdot and Wired, the Church of Scientology has also used the controversial Digital Millennium Copyright Act (DMCA) to force notable Web sites (including the Google search engine) to remove the Operation Clambake homepage, and several leaflets containing copyrighted information, from their indices. Because the Xenu.net site itself is based in Norway, it does not fall under the jurisdiction of the DMCA.

In March 2002, Google agreed to limit access to material critical of the Church of Scientology on www.xenu.net, after it was sued by the Church of Scientology for copyright infringement. Information the Church of Scientology had objected to included an internal report on the death of Lisa McPherson and images of L. Ron Hubbard. Google received criticism for its actions, and The Guardian reported that Operation Clambake suspected the Church of Scientology was mainly concerned about secret documents where "L Ron Hubbard is said to describe how an alien galactic ruler called Xenu is the root of all human woe". After Operation Clambake was delisted by Google, free-speech advocates besieged Google, complaining that the company was censoring search results. Prior to Google's delisting of the Operation Clambake site, CBC News reported that the site was listed fourth in a search for "Scientology". After Google's actions, Xenu.net did not appear in searches for "Scientology".

=== Aftermath ===
Though Google removed links to Operation Clambake for a short time, in place of the links Google posted a notice explaining the links were removed due to the DMCA and where an internet surfer could go to find more information. In April 2002 the International Herald Tribune reported that the net effect of the copyright controversy actually drove up the number of links to www.xenu.net, which improved its search results in searches for "Scientology" on Google to number two on the results page—just below the official site of the Church of Scientology. Reflecting on the controversy in a February 2003 interview in The Boston Globe Magazine, Google founder Sergey Brin stated: "Ultimately where we ended up was the right conclusion, but we didn't initially handle it correctly." Some groups critical of the Church of Scientology's actions have later used the Google bomb technique to increase Operation Clambake's Google rankings to the number three slot in a search for "Scientology" on the search engine, by linking the term "Scientology" on their Web pages to www.xenu.net. The Church of Scientology itself has also been accused of an attempt at Google bombing for making a large number of websites linking terms "Scientology" and "L. Ron Hubbard" to each other.

The publicity stemming from this incident was the impetus for Google contributing to the Chilling Effects archive, which archives legal threats of all sorts made against Internet users and Internet sites. Chilling Effects contains the original complaint letter from the law firm used by the Church of Scientology, Moxon & Kobrin. Helena Kobrin, lawyer for the Church of Scientology, stated she took offense at the name of the Web site, saying: "It implies that the First Amendment gives people some special right to infringe copyrights." Sergey Brin and Larry Page were both questioned on Google's response to the Church of Scientology's complaints in a 2004 interview in Playboy Magazine, and they appreciated Chilling Effects as a "nice compromise". Brin explained the new scenario: "So now, if you do a generic search on Scientology, you get a link to a site that discusses the legal aspects of why the anti-Scientology site isn't listed."

Also in 2002, Internet Archive removed all Wayback Machine archival pages of Xenu.net at the request of lawyers for the Church of Scientology. Initially queries reported that the pages had been removed "per the request of the site owner", which Andreas Heldal-Lund denied. This was later changed to a generic "Blocked Site Error" message.

== Reception ==
=== Awards and recognition ===
Operation Clambake is included as part of the Library of Congress "September 11 Web Archive," and in Spring 2002 www.xenu.net was listed as required reading for the course "Computers in Principle and Practice" at New York University, under a section on "Copyright and Censorship".

On May 17, 2003, Operation Clambake webmaster Andreas Heldal-Lund received the 2003 Leipzig Human Rights Award from the European-American Citizens Committee for Human Rights and Religious Freedom in the US, an organization which states it is composed of "Scientology opponents from all over the world". Operation Clambake was cited by the Committee for exposing what it referred to as "fraud and human rights violations" of the Church of Scientology in the United States. The former Secretary of State of France, Alain Vivien, presented Heldal-Lund with the Award and stated that his work had revealed the actions of Scientologists with "respect and intelligence". In his acceptance speech, Heldal-Lund spoke about freedom of speech and emphasized the role of the individual citizen.

=== Media resources ===
On June 16, 1998, Dateline NBC aired an investigative journalism piece on Scientology, and Operation Clambake was referenced on-screen as a resource to learn about "Xenu and the exploded souls". The St. Petersburg Times called Operation Clambake "the best known of the critical Web sites" on Scientology. New Straits Times referred to the site as "a fantastic source of information for anyone interested in the Scientology cult". In July 2000 The Wall Street Journal included Operation Clambake among its list of "Our Favorite Sites" under the "Opinion, Commentary and Gossip" section. The Seattle Times described Operation Clambake as "one of the most popular" sites critical of Scientology.

Many other news organizations have recognized the site's work. BBC News wrote that "(t)he Operation Clambake site portrays The Church as a money-hungry cult", and an article in The New York Times stated "(t)he site portrays the church as a greedy cult that exploits its members and harasses critics". Still other news articles have called Operation Clambake "an anti-Scientology Web site", and the program "Technofile" on Sky News called it "one of the most controversial sites on the web". The Associated Press cited the Xenu and OT III story in describing the Web site: "Critics at www.xenu.net and elsewhere say advanced Scientologists are taught that 75 million years ago, the cosmic ruler Xenu paralyzed billions of people in our galaxy, stacked them on Earth and destroyed their bodies with H-bombs, though the traumatized souls survived."

More recently, news media have consulted Operation Clambake and its proprietor when seeking out information for background on stories involving Church of Scientology and related organizations. The Sunday Times used Operation Clambake's resources while doing a January 2007 story on Narconon and its links to the Church of Scientology. The Daily Reveille consulted Operation Clambake resources for an article on the "Second Chance" program, specifically for background on the Scientology doctrine known as the "Purification Rundown". In April 2007, the Daily News cited an "emergency bulletin" disseminated by Church of Scientology leaders that was posted on Operation Clambake, which seemed to refute claims by Church of Scientology representatives that their ministers were forbidden from proselytizing on campus after the Virginia Tech massacre. In August 2007, the Associated Press included information from Operation Clambake in an article on Scientology's attempts to connect with religious leaders from other faiths.

=== Scholarly perception ===
In Who Controls the Internet?: Illusions of a Borderless World, Jack Goldsmith notes that the site's "secret library of Scientology" page was blocked from Google for a short time. He notes that Google's actions in the matter were indicative of its policy to remove search results when threatened by governmental action. The incident between Google and the Church of Scientology involving the Web site was also discussed in an annual meeting of The State Bar of California and cited as part of the caselaw for "Domestic Copyright Law in Cyberspace."

Fred von Lohmann, an attorney with the Electronic Frontier Foundation, raised free speech concerns in the Xenu.net case, stating: "The danger is that people will attempt to silence critics under the guise of copyright infringement." In Beyond the First Amendment: The Politics of Free Speech and Pluralism, author Samuel Peter Nelson raises the question: "Why should a private actor (Church of Scientology) in the United States have the power to restrict the speech of a Dutch citizen publishing in the Netherlands whose speech is protected by Dutch law?"

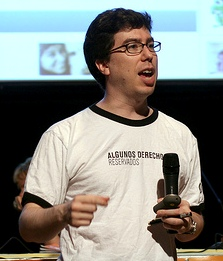
Harvard Law professor Jonathan Zittrain

In an interview on the Xenu.net controversy, Harvard Law School professor Jonathan Zittrain predicted that more conflicts involving the Church of Scientology were likely to occur in the future. Zittrain stated: "The cutting edge on such battles is often the Church of Scientology. They have very well honed procedures and tactics to remove information that they find objectionable."

Mentioning Operation Clambake as an example of an Internet response to a controversial movement in their 2003 book Understanding New Religious Movements, John A. Saliba and J. Gordon Melton referred to the site as "a Web page devoted to the negative aspects of Scientology". Douglas E. Cowan, writing in Religion Online (2004), characterizes Operation Clambake as an example of a "surfeit of sites dedicated to so-called watchdog organizations or […] home pages of disgruntled ex-members." According to Cowan, Internet coverage of the Church of Scientology represents an "important example of competing propagandas that struggle for authority and control both online and off". Cowan proposes that Operation Clambake seeks to demonstrate that the Church of Scientology "lacks any redeeming social value". Cowan notes that most of the content presented by the site is not the result of original research by the owner but rather a collection of hyperlinks to media reports, scholarly and popular articles, court documents and out-of-print books. Complemented by links to like-minded sites hosting essentially the same information, the result is thought by Cowan to be inflation of the apparent quantity of anti-Scientology material available. According to Cowan, Operation Clambake is not designed to be read by Scientologists, but rather meant for those who already hold negative views about Scientology and might join Heldal-Lund in his self-stated purpose: "The Fight Against the Church of Scientology on the Net." Cowan compares the site to a propaganda effort and writes that a message is presented repeatedly, consistently to a target audience that already has some affinity with it, leading to a somewhat self-limiting construction of reality.

== See also ==
- Project Chanology
- Scientology and the Internet
- Scientology and the legal system
- Scientology controversy
- Freedom of speech
