= Beyond the First Amendment =

2005 book

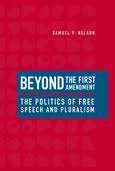
- Author: Samuel Peter Nelson
- Language: English
- Subject: Freedom of speech
- Genre: Law
- Publisher: Johns Hopkins University Press
- Publication date: 2005
- Publication place: United States
- Pages: 240
- ISBN: 978-0801881732
- OCLC: 56924685

Beyond the First Amendment: The Politics of Free Speech and Pluralism is a book about freedom of speech and the First Amendment to the United States Constitution, written by author Samuel Peter Nelson. It was published by Johns Hopkins University Press in 2005. In it, Nelson discusses how the more general notion of free speech differs from that specifically applied to the First Amendment in American law.

The book was positively received in reviews from academic and legal journals. Choice: Current Reviews for Academic Libraries recommended the book due to its thought-provoking propositions, and a review in The Journal of Politics described it as "a nice effort to explore free speech issues not covered by the First Amendment or constitutional law". A review in the journal Political Communication concluded of the author's argumentation: "His is indeed a theory fraught with possibilities both favorable and unfavorable to an expanded scope for the contents of free speech". Law and Politics Book Review concluded "Beyond the First Amendment is an intriguing and important contribution to the literature on free speech".

== Author ==
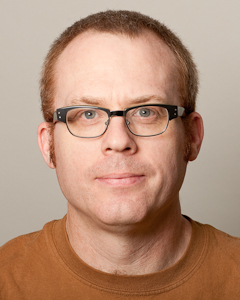
Samuel Peter Nelson (2009)

Samuel Peter Nelson graduated from Northwestern University with a Bachelor of Arts degree. He subsequently obtained a PhD from the University of Wisconsin–Madison. Nelson is an associate professor in the department of political science and public administration at the University of Toledo, having joined the department in 2001.

== Contents ==
Nelson's work discusses the differences between concepts in the United States involving the First Amendment to the United States Constitution, and the larger notion of freedom of speech. The author discusses complex problems involving cyberspace communications and discourse which takes place on the Internet, and puts forth the supposition that such speech is not as easily addressed by the United States Constitution. Nelson points out that legal matters dealing with free speech in society often occur outside the United States or through regulation of online parties by sovereign state entities, and thus do not always directly fall within the jurisdiction of the United States government and American law. Nelson introduces the concept of a "pluralist framework" to address the various factors which drive free speech.

== Analysis ==
Beyond the First Amendment is cited as a reference in the Encyclopedia of American Civil Liberties edited by Paul Finkelman, and Self-Examination: The Present and Future of Librarianship by John M. Budd. The book received a positive reception from a review in Choice: Current Reviews for Academic Libraries by M. W. Bowers of the University of Nevada, Las Vegas, who wrote: "The work is recommended reading for its provocative argument".

In a review of the book in The Journal of Politics, Mark A. Graber of the University of Maryland pointed out how the book's author highlights areas of free speech which fall outside the jurisdiction of the First Amendment to the United States Constitution, and commented:

This effort to highlight important free speech issues in areas that are not governed by the First Amendment offers a particularly promising avenue for political scientists interested in American constitutionalism. Doctrinal scholarship is dominated by law professors who have special training in making legal arguments. By comparison, the constitutional issues that arise outside of constitutional law discussed in Beyond the First Amendment require the sort of special training in political theory and public policy that marks education in the social sciences."

Graber concluded, "Beyond the First Amendment highlights how most crucial questions in institutional settings concern the value that ought to be placed on certain expressions rather than the legal right to engage in that expression".

Peter G. Fish of Duke University reviewed Beyond the First Amendment for Political Communication, and wrote that Nelson's arguments within the book "provide able and well-crafted analyses of identifiable problems in communications". Fish analyzed the nature of Nelson's argumentation, and commented "Nelson is seemingly offering a cost (injury to society)-benefit analysis for specific exercises of all kinds of speech in the context of all sorts of social values and relationships irrespective of whether such relationships are found in the public or private sphere". Fish discussed Nelson's concepts within the framework of changing viewpoints on free speech through varying mediums of communication including online fora and speech in other venues: "How to weigh these elements also figures in Nelson's consideration of the Internet with its capacity for international communications—how to weigh the intent of an Internet speaker against an unintended hostile foreign audience shielded by its own local laws or even remote, but culturally distinctive, domestic audiences for that matter". He posits that Nelson's plurality theory contains elements which would impact free speech in the future: "What Nelson terms 'incommensurable values' embedded in remote legal cultures not perceived by the speaker requires close attention to context, speaker's intention or lack thereof, and 'uptake' on the part of distant audiences. His is indeed a theory fraught with possibilities both favorable and unfavorable to an expanded scope for the contents of free speech".

Beyond the First Amendment is an intriguing and important contribution to the literature on free speech.

— Law and Politics Book Review

Professor Steven B. Lichtman of the department of political science at the University of Vermont reviewed the book for the Law and Politics Book Review, and identified Nelson's pluralist theory as a significant contribution. Lichtman commented, "The most important contribution of Beyond the First Amendment is its attempt to offer up a new model for understanding and safeguarding free speech". He praised the author for supporting his model with case history: "As a purely philosophical matter, Nelson’s pluralist framework is certainly intriguing. The model must be more than a mere talking point, though, and Nelson wisely endeavors to show how the pluralist framework can be deployed as a means of resolving actual cases". Lichtman concluded by recommending the work for academic scholars: "Beyond the First Amendment is an intriguing and important contribution to the literature on free speech. While it is likely beyond the grasp of all but the most talented undergraduates, its overview of First Amendment theory is an excellent resource for graduate students beginning to explore the field. For scholars, it is a challenging and provocative work sure to cause us to reassess how we teach and write about the subject".

== See also ==
- Censorship
- Censorship in the United States
- Free content
- Freedom of speech by country
- Freedom of speech in the United States
- Freedom of the press
- Freedom of the Press Foundation
- International Freedom of Expression Exchange
