= Andreas Heldal-Lund =

Norwegian anti-Scientology activist (1964–2024)

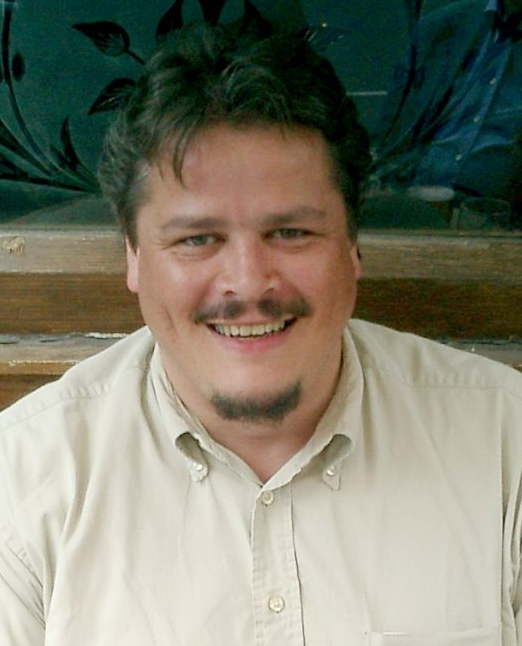
- Heldal-Lund in 2005
- Born: 10 December 1964; Oslo, Norway
- Died: 2 January 2024 (aged 59)
- Occupation: Webmaster
- Known for: Internet activism against the Church of Scientology
- Website: xenu.net

Andreas Heldal-Lund (10 December 1964 – 2 January 2024) was a Norwegian anti-Scientology activist best known for operating the website Operation Clambake.

== Personal life ==
Andreas Heldal-Lund was born in Oslo, Norway on 10 December 1964. He moved to Stavanger, Norway in 1985.

In May 2022, Heldal-Lund was diagnosed with a malignant brain tumour, known as glioblastoma. He died on 2 January 2024 at the age of 59, in the arms of his living partner and a few close friends.

== Activism ==
Heldal-Lund served on multiple boards for the national secular humanist organization Human-Etisk Forbund. He was also a member of the Norwegian Society of Heathens.

Heldal-Lund first became interested in the Church of Scientology in 1996 when he read about Magne Berge, an ex-member in Norway, who sued the organization in court and won. Heldal-Lund started gathering information about Scientology and eventually began hosting the materials himself as part of a project he called Operation Clambake.

Heldal-Lund was also a contributor to the alt.religion.scientology newsgroup. On 14 July 2000, he sent an email to a user calling themselves "Magoo" with advice for making their posts more readable. This started a conversation between the two. Of the experience, Magoo would later say to Heldal-Lund, "I honestly thought you were the devil...I was amazed at how kind you were. I thought for sure you would be the meanest and worst of all the critics. So when you were you, it really cracked the shell." Magoo made an announcement on 20 July 2000 on alt.religion.scientology that she was Tory Bezazian and she was no longer a Scientologist.

In 2003, Heldal-Lund received the Leipzig Human Rights Award from the European-American Citizens Committee for Human Rights and Religious Freedom in the US, an organization which states it is composed of "Scientology opponents from all over the world."

He received an honorary award in 2022 from Human-Etisk Forbund.

== Operation Clambake ==
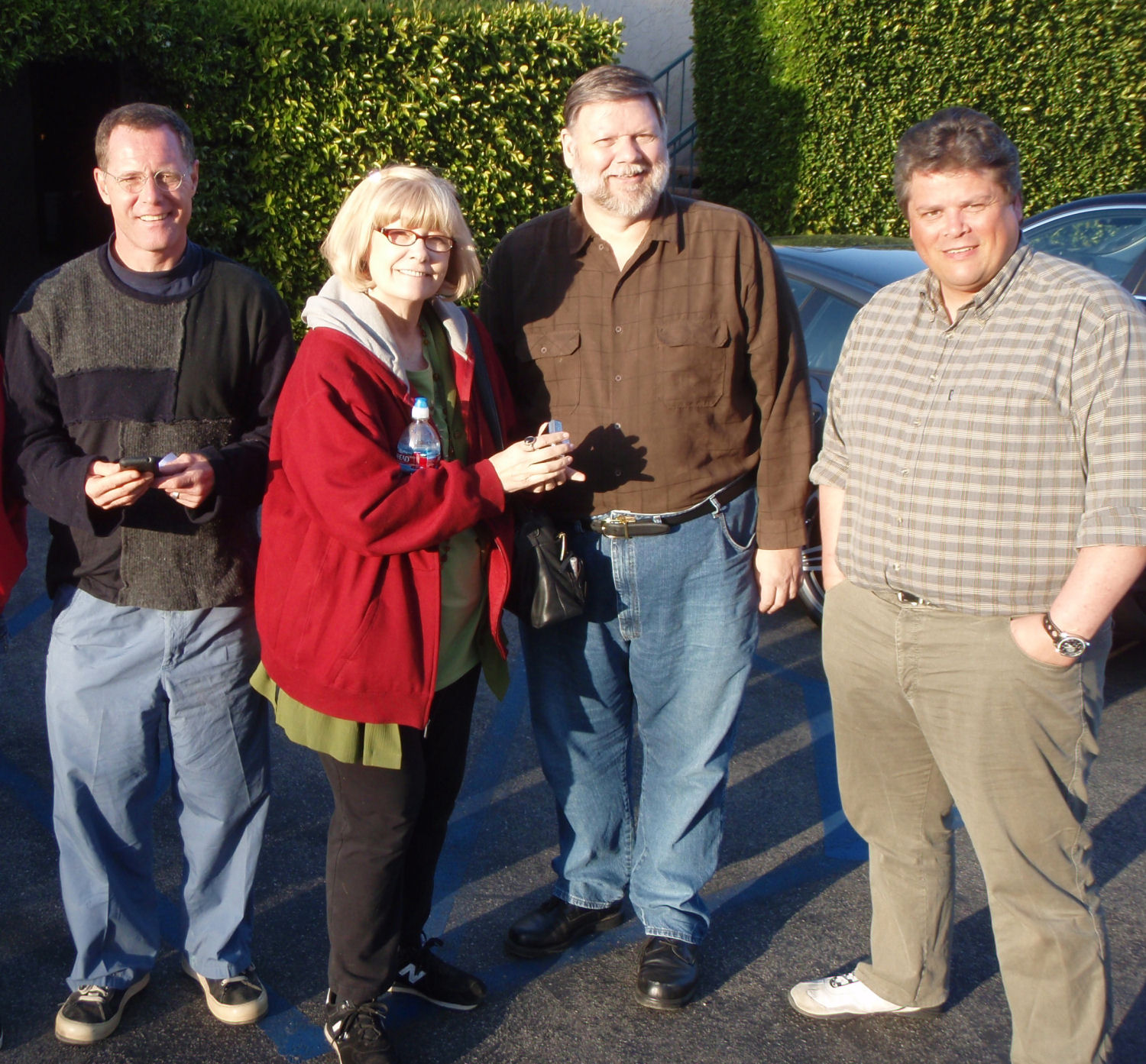
Actor Jason Beghe, Tory Christman, Mark Bunker, and Andreas Heldal-Lund (2008)

Andreas Heldal-Lund originally created a website that was a list of links to articles and information about Scientology and the Church of Scientology. When he noticed that the links kept disappearing because of legal maneuvering by the church, he decided to host the information himself.

Most of the information presented by Operation Clambake is critical of the Church of Scientology and its leadership, although dissenters are given prominent space to air their differences.

Even though the Church of Scientology had threatened legal action, Heldal-Lund said he'd never been sued. Norway has more liberal copyright laws which provide more freedom of speech protections. However, Mike Rinder, a former executive director of the Office of Special Affairs for the Church of Scientology, and Leah Remini, a former Scientologist, put forth another theory in a conversation with Heldal-Lund in their Fair Game Podcast. It as Heldal-Lund's chosen domain name of xenu.net that may be responsible. Xenu is a central character in Scientology's creation myth which can only be accessed in higher levels of the church. Scientologists are required to sign a confidentiality agreement that contains a clause stating they understand they will be fined each time they speak about the materials with anyone else. According to Remini, this fine can go as high as $100,000 for each infraction. Filing a lawsuit and referencing the name xenu.net in court documents could breach this agreement.

Instead Heldal-Lund said the Church sent harassing letters to his job and investigated his friends and former partners. Every time he'd think about stepping away, the church would do something else to keep him invested. In an interview with Dawn Olsen, Heldal-Lund said, "They created me; if they had left me alone and ignored me, I probably would have been doing this for [only] a couple of months."

The church also targeted his ISP, network service providers and filed Digital Millennium Copyright Act (DMCA) takedown notices with both Google and the Wayback Machine to remove links to xenu.net.. Under the law, if the site owner feels the removed links are fair use, they can file a counter notice under the DMCA to have the links restored. Heldal-Lund declined to take this step because he felt that filing the counter notice would subject him to US copyright law. Public outcry from free speech advocates made Google restore some of the links to xenu.net. For a time, this also resulted in Operation Clambake rising to the number two position on Google search results for "Scientology;" just under the church's official website.

When actor Jason Beghe decided to leave Scientology in 2008, he contacted Heldal-Lund, who convinced him to meet with Mark Bunker, a critic of Scientology known to the Anonymous group as "Wise Beard Man". Heldal-Lund and Bunker went to Beghe's house, where Beghe participated in an interview about his experiences as a Scientologist. Bunker published a two-hour portion of the three-hour interview to YouTube on 4 June 2008.

In the aftermath of online acts taken against Scientology by the group Anonymous as part of the protest movement Project Chanology, Heldal-Lund released a statement criticizing the digital assault against Scientology. "People should be able to have easy access to both sides and make up their own opinions. Freedom of speech means we need to allow all to speak – including those we strongly disagree with."

== Awards ==
- Leipzig Human Rights Award, 17 May 2003
- Honorary Award in 2022 from Human-Etisk Forbund
