= Clear (Scientology) =

Status given to some Scientologists

- Type: Status in Scientology
- Description: A status given to Scientologists who are considered free of the influence of mental recordings of trauma and no longer have their own reactive mind
- Key texts: Dianetics: The Modern Science of Mental Health (1950)
- Subjects: Dianetics, Scientology

In Dianetics and Scientology, Clear is a status afforded to followers by the Scientology organization, or by other Scientologists, after they complete certain activities. It is one of the major ostensible "states" practitioners strive to reach on their way up what the Scientologists call the Bridge to Total Freedom. Scientology followers are given the status of Clear when a person is deemed to be free of the influence of engrams – supposed unwanted emotions or painful traumas that Scientology claims are not readily available to the conscious mind. Scientologists believe that human beings accumulate anxieties, psychosomatic illnesses, and aberrations due to receiving engrams throughout their current or past lives, and that by applying Dianetics, every person can obtain the status of Clear.

A Clear is defined by the Church of Scientology as a person who no longer has a "reactive mind" (a pseudoscientific subdivision of the mind), and is therefore free from negative effects purported to be produced by the "reactive mind". A Clear is said to be "at cause over" (that is, in control of) their "mental energy" (their thoughts), and able to think clearly even when faced with the very situations that in earlier times caused them difficulty. The next level of spiritual development is that of an Operating Thetan. A person who has not reached a state of Clear is called a preclear.

Dianetics claims that a person's awareness is influenced by the stimulus-response nature of the "reactive mind". Achieving the state of Clear means a person has supposedly overcome the "reactive mind" and is in complete control of their analytical mind. According to Hubbard: "A Clear is a being who no longer has his own reactive mind, and therefore suffers none of the ill effects the reactive mind can cause. The Clear has no engrams which, when restimulated, throw out the correctness of his computations by entering hidden and false data." Sociologist Roy Wallis noted, "Being Clear meant being able to do all those things which one could currently not do, and to which one aspired so desperately". It is estimated that the cost of reaching the Clear state in Scientology is $128,000.

== The state of Clear ==
In Dianetics, L. Ron Hubbard, founder of Scientology, states that becoming a Clear strengthens a person's native individuality and creativity, and that a Clear is free with his emotions. In The State Of Clear, a Clear is defined as "a being who no longer has his own reactive mind, and therefore suffers none of the ill effects the reactive mind can cause". Hubbard states that merely knowing what the cognition is does not have the effect of realizing it for oneself:

Now, we've known for a long time that a thetan made up his own bank (reactive mind), but telling him so didn't get him over it. And we've just found out again that telling him so didn't get him over it, too. Even when he's almost Clear. We say, "Hey, you're mocking it up," and he'd say, "Hey, am I mocking it up? Yeah, I am mocking it up." And he'll go Clear — pshew! — and he goes off that bottom step that isn't there, you know? And he's got to go back on and finish it up the way he should. It's got to be his cognition.

Hubbard described Clears as having "an awareness which can create energy at will, and can handle and control, erase or re-create an analytical or reactive mind". Hubbard claimed that Clears have complete memories and know why events in their lives have happened, which leaves them free to pursue their goals without hindrances (the "reactive mind") emanating from past experiences. Religious scholar Pat Cook compared being "Clear" to the concept of nirvana in Zen Buddhism: like nirvana in Buddhism, Clear is a state of being that is highly desired and respected in Scientology.

The Clear state is said to be achieved through the Scientology practice of auditing. A person undergoing auditing is called a preclear, often abbreviated to "pc", in Scientology terminology. The Church of Scientology claims that if all individuals in the world were “Clear”, the world would be “free of drugs, war, pollution, crime, mental illness and other ills.”

== Steps after Clear ==
After attaining the state of Clear, a person may go on to study the Operating Thetan levels, which are described in Scientology materials as states where the ability to operate outside the body via "exteriorization" becomes commonplace. Beyond that comes "Cleared Theta Clear", which Hubbard describes this way:

A thetan who is completely rehabilitated and can do everything a thetan should do, such as move MEST (matter, energy, space, and time) and control others from a distance, or create his own universe; a person who is able to create his own universe or, living in the MEST universe is able to create illusions perceivable by others at will, to handle MEST universe objects without mechanical means and to have and feel no need of bodies or even the MEST universe to keep himself and his friends interested in existence.

— L. Ron Hubbard

== Early Clears ==
There are several conflicting accounts of who first attained the state of Clear, and under what circumstances. In August 1950, amidst the success of Dianetics, Hubbard held a demonstration in Los Angeles' Shrine Auditorium where he presented a young woman called Sonya Bianchi to a large audience including many reporters and photographers as "the world's first Clear". Science-fiction author Arthur Jean Cox's April 1952 letter to skeptic Martin Gardner would later claim that the event was a "fiasco", which Gardner repeated: "in the demonstration that followed, she failed to remember a single formula in physics (the subject in which she was majoring) or the color of Hubbard's tie when his back was turned. At this point, a large part of the audience got up and left." Cox had also claimed that Bianchi was unable to answer questions from the audience testing her memory and analytical abilities including the question of the color of Hubbard's tie. Parade magazine, published two months after the event, wrote: "Other reports are even more impressive. Sonya Bianchi, a favorite student of founder Hubbard, and a winsome graduate student at Wellesley College, made this report to 6,000 dianetics enthusiasts in Los Angeles: 'I had violent sinus trouble. I also had a strange and embarrassing allergy to fresh paint for days after I came in contact with it. I had a painful itching in my eyebrows. Both conditions have cleared up, and I feel like a million dollars.' End of Bianchi’s report."

Later, in the late 1950s, Hubbard would claim that several people had reached the state of Clear by the time he presented Bianchi as the world's first; these others, Hubbard said, he had successfully cleared in the late 1940s while working incognito in Hollywood posing as a swami.

In 1966, Hubbard declared South African Scientologist John McMaster to be the first true Clear. McMaster had joined Scientology around 1962, having experienced relief of chronic stomach pain after his first auditing session. He became a leading public spokesman for Scientology and later a member of the Sea Org. He left in November 1969, expressing continuing belief in Scientology techniques, but disapproval of the way Scientology was managed.

== See also ==
- Going Clear (book), a 2013 book on Scientology by Lawrence Wright
- Going Clear (film), a 2015 documentary by Alex Gibney based on the book
