= Dianetics: The Modern Science of Mental Health =

1950 book by L. Ron Hubbard

Dianetics: The Modern Science of Mental Health; A Handbook of Dianetic Therapy
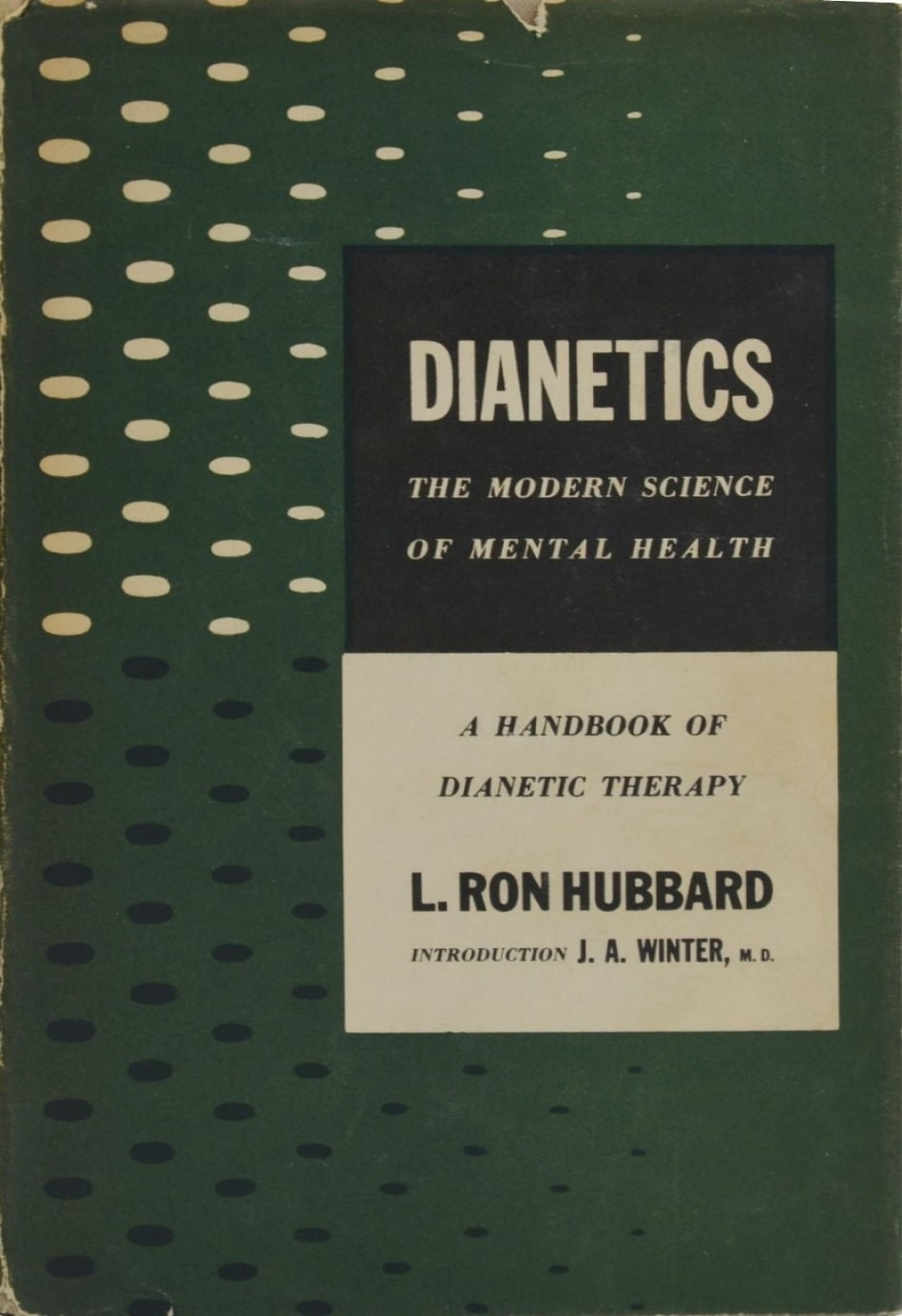
- Cover of the first edition
- Author: L. Ron Hubbard
- Language: English
- Subject: Dianetics
- Publisher: Hermitage House
- Publication date: May 9, 1950
- Publication place: United States
- Media type: Print (hard and paperback)
- Pages: 452

Dianetics: The Modern Science of Mental Health, sometimes abbreviated as DMSMH, is a book by L. Ron Hubbard describing a pseudoscientific set of ideas, Dianetics, that would later become part of Scientology. Hubbard claimed to have developed it from a combination of personal experience, basic principles of Eastern philosophy and the work of Sigmund Freud. The book is considered part of Scientology's canon. It is colloquially referred to by Scientologists as Book One. Published in 1950, the book launched the movement that Hubbard later characterized as a religion. As of 2013, the Scientology organization's publishing arm, New Era Publications, sells the book in English and in 50 other languages.

In the book, Hubbard wrote that he had isolated the "dynamic principle of existence", which he states as the basic command Survive!, and presents his description of the human mind. He identified the source of human aberration as the "reactive mind", a normally hidden but always conscious area of the mind, and certain traumatic memories (engrams) stored in it. Dianetics describes counseling (or auditing) techniques which Hubbard claimed would get rid of engrams and bring major therapeutic benefits.

The work was criticized by scientists and medical professionals, who note that the work has no scientific basis and that the claims presented in the book are written in superficially scientific language but without evidence. Despite this, Dianetics proved a major commercial success on its publication, although B. Dalton employees have stated these figures were inflated by Hubbard's Scientologist-controlled publisher, who had groups of Scientologists each purchase dozens or even hundreds of copies of Hubbard's books and then sold these back to the same retailers. Adam Clymer, a New York Times executive and journalist, said the newspaper examined the sales patterns of Hubbard's books and uncovered no instances in which vast quantities of books were being sold to single individuals.

== Background ==
Before the publication of Dianetics, L. Ron Hubbard was a prolific writer for pulp magazines. He attended George Washington University engineering school, but did not graduate. The Church of Scientology considers the book Dianetics: The Modern Science of Mental Health as a representation of Hubbard's concepts of "the human mind, its functions, and the problems related to these functions." Hubbard presented Dianetics as a "therapeutic technique with which can be treated all inorganic mental ills and all organic psychosomatic ills, with the assurance of complete cure in unselected cases." In this body of work, Hubbard also attested that human beings are motivated "only" by survival.

According to Hubbard, the ideas in Dianetics were developed over twelve years of research, although many of his friends at the time said this claim is false. The first public outline of those ideas was an article in the pulp magazine Astounding Science Fiction, titled "Dianetics: A new science of the mind" appearing a few weeks before the publication of the book but published in the May 1950 issue of the magazine, the same month the book was published; the book-length article was later published as the book Dianetics: The Evolution of a Science. This advance publicity generated so much interest that in April 1950, Hubbard and Astounding editor John W. Campbell with other interested parties established the Hubbard Dianetic Research Foundation. Hubbard claimed to have written Dianetics in three weeks. His writing speed was assisted by a special IBM typewriter which accepted paper on a continuous roll and which had dedicated keys for common words like the or but. An early version of the book, Abnormal Dianetics, intended for the medical profession, was rejected by numerous publishers as well as the medical profession but was passed in mimeograph form from hand to hand and was later sold under the name Dianetics: The Original Thesis; the same book is published at present as The Dynamics of Life. Like other works by L. Ron Hubbard, Dianetics: The Modern Science of Mental Health has been subject to continuous editing since its inception so that at present it hardly resembles the original 1950 edition.

== Content ==
According to religion scholar Dorthe Refslund Christensen, in Scientology, DMSMH represents "the most elaborate of Hubbard's presentations on the human mind, its functions, and the problems related to these functions." The opening chapter presents the context of Dianetics as human beings being preoccupied with "finding a science of the mind that could not only isolate the common denominator of life and the goal of thought" but also isolate the only source of "strange illnesses and aberrations". Hubbard claims that the two answers to the question of human misery across time and civilizations have been religion and magical practices and modern psychotherapy that includes the practice of electroshocks and brain surgeries, which according to him, have turned patients into "helpless zombies". Dianetics, he claims is the answer to this dilemma.

In the section "How to Read this Book", L. Ron Hubbard suggests to read right on through. An "Important Note" appeared in later editions of the book advising the reader to understand every word read.

=== Engram terminology ===
Engrams are considered "mental images or facsimiles of past pain, injury or harm that prevent the believer from being at cause over matter, energy, space, and time."

In the book, Hubbard uses two different definitions for the word engram. In Book One, Hubbard states the Fundamental Axioms of Dianetics, among which is "The engram is a moment of 'unconsciousness' containing physical pain or painful emotion and all perceptions and is not available to the analytical mind as experience". Later in the text, Hubbard writes "The word engram in Dianetics is used in its severely accurate sense as a 'definite and permanent trace left by a stimulus on the protoplasm of a tissue'. It is considered as a unit group of stimuli impinged solely on the cellular being."

Gutfreund and Toulouse in 1994 wrote that "nobody has ever seen a specific memory trace ('engram') in the brain". Karl Lashley spent decades looking for the engram which he abandoned in 1950 for non-localized memory. This was not the same type of engram described by Hubbard. However, Hubbard derived his ideas and the term "engram", from psychology sources, and biology. Richard Semon coined the term "engram" in 1904 and wrote extensively about it in 1921, decades before the publication of Dianetics.

=== The state of Clear ===
According to Flinn, Hubbard describes a Clear as "the optimum individual: no longer possessed of any engrams". In the book, Clears do not catch colds, are unrepressed, have complete recall and keener perceptions, and are free of all aberrations and psychosomatic ills; "the Dianetic Clear is to a current normal individual as the current normal person is to the severely insane".

Science fiction writer Damien Broderick notes that paranormal powers are common sf devices, and that Hubbard turned such idioms into truth-claims about reality. In DMSMH, to explain the abilities of a Clear, Hubbard makes use of tropes and special idioms and draws the attention away by pointing to old colloquialisms as the "mind's eye". In the chapter "The Clear", Hubbard uses such phrases as "optimum recall", "optimum individual", "What a Clear can do easily, quite a few people have, from time to time, been partially able to do in the past", "A clear uses imagination in its entirety", and "Rationality, as divorced from aberration, can be studied in a Cleared person only". After attributing many benefits to the Clear state, Hubbard admits "Until we obtain Clears, it remains obscure why such differences should exist".

=== Claimed illnesses and cures ===
Through Dianetics, Hubbard claimed that most illnesses were psychosomatic and caused by engrams, including arthritis, dermatitis, allergies, asthma, coronary difficulties, eye trouble, bursitis, ulcers, sinusitis and migraine headaches. He further claimed that dianetic therapy could treat these illnesses, and also included cancer and diabetes as conditions that Dianetic research was focused on.

In 1951, Consumer Report announced a one-month $500 course, based on the recently published Dianetics, open to anyone and intended to produce the Clear, the goal of Dianetic therapy. The report on "a new cult" places Dianetics beyond the scope of medical practice.

=== Theory of the mind ===
The book follows the original line of research:

1. The discovery of the dynamic principle of existence and its meaning;
2. The discovery of the source of aberration: the reactive mind;
3. Therapy and its application.

According to Hubbard, the basic discovery is not that man survives, but that he is solely motivated by survival. The book states that the Reactive Mind works solely on a stimulus-response basis and it stores not memories but engrams.

Dianetics purports to reveal revolutionary discoveries about the source of psychosomatic illness, neuroses and other mental ailments, as well as an exact, infallible way of permanently curing them. Hubbard divides the human mind into an "analytic mind" which supposedly functions perfectly, and a "reactive mind" which is incapable of thinking or making distinctions. When the analytic mind is unconscious, the reactive mind physically records memories called "engrams". As a result of all stimuli it receives, the Reactive Mind is a mass of engrams, feeding the otherwise perfect Analytical Mind incorrect data. Misinterpretation of these Reactive Mind engrams by the analytical mind causes damage later in life. Actually, these engrams cause compulsions and repressions in later life. According to Hubbard, a person is affected in later life by the unconscious effects of these engrams. By a process called "Dianetic auditing", the book promises, people can achieve a superhuman state called "Clear" with superior IQ, morally pure intentions and greatly improved mental and physical health. In August 1950, Hubbard predicted that Clears would become the world's new aristocracy, although he admitted that he had not achieved the state himself. In welcoming expectancy, the Theosophist Magazine compares the Dianetic engram to the Theosophic permanent atom as these atoms receive and retransmit impressions received life after life so that as the ego descends to a new birth, the new incarnation receives the stored impressions of engrams from previous lives. As the appearance of a new science, it was not so explicitly stated in DMSMH but eventually, Hubbard would go into the exploration of past lives with Dianetics.

=== Hypnosis and narcosynthesis ===
In Dianetics, Hubbard mentions the post-hypnotic suggestion. This phenomenon of the post-hypnotic suggestion was described as far back as 1787. The development of Dynamic psychiatry dates back to the encounter between the physician Mesmer and the exorcist Johann Joseph Gassner. According to followers of the school of Dynamic Psychiatry, the advent of hypnotism signaled the discovery of the unconscious. At the Oak Knoll Naval Hospital, where he was being treated for ulcers, Hubbard studied hypnosis, psychological theory and other similar subjects; Hubbard was quite adept at hypnotism. According to Hubbard, it was trying to find what makes hypnotism such a wide variable that led to the discovery of the Reactive Mind. Dr. Roy Grinker and Dr. John Spiegel developed Narcosynthesis which was widely used by psychiatrists in World War II. In the book Dianetics Hubbard mentions Narcosynthesis or drug-hypnosis. However, Hubbard states that the technique of drug-hypnosis has been known for ages, both in ancient Greece and in the Orient. The technique of narcosynthesis is not used in Dianetics even though Hubbard may have been trained in it while in Naval Intelligence. A shot of sodium pentothal is administered as a truth serum. The technique is described on page 150 of the 2007 edition of Dianetics: the modern science of mental health.

=== Therapy and auditing ===
The medical establishment completely rejected the new "science" for lack of experimental proof. Dianetics has never passed any scientific rigor. In 1953, Harvey Jay Fischer wrote the report Dianetic Therapy: an experimental evaluation concluding that "Dianetic does not systematically favorably or adversely influence the ability to perform" either intellectually, mathematically or resolving personality conflicts. According to Hubbard's son, DMSMH is not the result of any research whatsoever but a man's obsession with abortion and other phenomena of the unconscious, specially the occult and black magic. The entire Chapter 4 of Book Two in DMSMH is devoted to demonology. To maintain the "scientific" appearance of DMSMH, Hubbard decries the belief in demons. In DMSMH, demons are explained as electronic circuits. However, in Hubbard's later writings, entities begin to appear that possess man's physical body. These entities are spirits which Hubbard calls "thetans". What Hubbard does assert is that demonology is good business. A person is a thetan but the person's physical body is possessed by thetans called body thetans. To be spiritually free, a person would have to audit out all those other thetans in the body and that would take a great deal of time and a great deal of money.

In advising the auditor to be uncommunicative, Hubbard was divorcing Dianetics from other psycho-therapies, as in psychoanalysis, where the therapist most obstinately offers a personal interpretation of what is happening in the patient's mind.

Scientologist Harvey Jackins said of Dianetics therapy: "The results have been nearly uniform and positive. Apparently, the auditor (listener or therapist) can be very forthright and direct in seeking out the past traumatic experiences which are continuing to mar the rationality and well being of the person. Once located, the exhaustion of the distress and re-evaluation of the experience apparently leads uniformly to dramatic improvement in ability, emotional tone and well-being."

Hubbard considered that to maintain silence around unconscious or injured persons is of the utmost importance in the prevention of aberration. After the publication of DMSMH, Hubbard moved to Cuba. There, the signs in every hospital zone are still prominently displayed: Hospital Silence. In a letter dated December 7, 1950, Ernest Hemingway's son Greg writes to his father mentioning that the publisher of Dianetics is coming down to Cuba to present Ernest with a copy in earnest. Hemingway's son's girlfriend is the publisher's daughter; Greg himself is working at the Hubbard Dianetic Research Foundation. On December 14, Hemingway answered: "The Dianetics king never sent the book so I bought one, but Miss Nita borrowed it and it is still outside of the joint. So have not been able to practice jumping back into the womb or any of those popular New York indoor sports and have to just continue to write them as I see them."

According to Martin Gardner, the workability of Dianetics lies in the field of faith healing as most neurotics will react positively to something they have faith in. There is nothing extraordinary about Dianetics case histories as it is something quite common in faith healing.

Finally, Hubbard gives fair warning to those who attempt to self-audit his DIY (do-it-yourself) Dianetic process. It cannot be done, says Hubbard, because every engram contains analytical attenuation. It is better to learn to audit the technique and apply it to others. Anyone engaged in self-auditing will only succeed in getting sick. However, in later developments of technique application Hubbard would develop "Solo Auditing" where auditor and preclear are one and the same except that in the procedure as always Hubbard would be obeyed to the letter. In Dianetics and Scientology, self-auditing always carries a bad connotation while solo auditing does not. As usual, Hubbard's particular use of nomenclature would win the day.

Hubbard says in DMSMH that all civilizations have had two responses to the reality of human misery: first, "religion and magical practices", second, "modern psychotherapy", which according to him, "have exceeded the brutality of magic and religious practices by turning patients into helpless zombies." He also said that because man does not understand himself, he has developed "terrifying weapons", which is the reason that the earth is in war.

=== Hubbard's commentary on psychiatric diagnoses ===
Hubbard was against the diagnosis of psychiatric disorders, saying it "is so much wasted time", since, "on the one hand, detailed diagnoses does not cure the patient and, on the other hand, the things the auditor needs to know to cure the patient will appear to him or her during auditing: the patient will talk about them." According to Christensen, Hubbard claims that there are only three things that need to be established instead of a diagnosis: "(1) Are his or her 'perceptics' over or under optimum? (2) How is the patient's ability to recall by utilizing the different perceptics? and (3) is he or she 'overusing' his or her imagination by recalling too many things or by too many perceptics?"

=== Hubbard's commentary on illness and disease ===
Hubbard believed in the ability of Dianetics to cure illnesses, and also claimed that most pathologies had a psychosomatic origin. "Psychosomatic disorders were estimated by Hubbard to include 70 percent of all illnesses and were exemplified by asthma, arthritis, dermatitis, allergies, some coronary difficulties, eye trouble, bursitis, ulcers, sinusitis, migraine headaches etc., while mental disorders were neuroses, psychoses, compulsions, serious depressions, etc." Hubbard later stated that Dianetics had nothing to do with psychosomatic illness: "Dianetics today is a science of ability. It has no traffic with psychosomatic illness or aberration. It does not care a whit about these two things. Dianetics today can be prepared to expect out of an asylum, or off a mount, alike some benefit to mankind."

== Initial publication ==
Dianetics was first published May 9, 1950, by Hermitage House, at One Madison Ave., a New York-based publisher of psychiatric textbooks whose president, Arthur Ceppos, was also on the Board of Directors of the Hubbard Dianetic Research Foundation. The book became a nationwide bestseller, selling over 150,000 copies within a year. Due to the interest generated, a multitude of "Dianetics clubs" and similar organizations were formed for the purpose of applying Dianetics techniques. Hubbard himself established a nationwide network of Dianetic Research Foundations, offering Dianetics training and processing for a fee. Dianetics blossomed into a national fad and was then denounced by psychologists.

The original edition of the book included an introduction by J. A. Winter, M.D., who became the first medical director of the Hubbard Dianetic Research Foundation, an appendix on "The Philosophic Method" by Will Durant (reprinted from The Story of Philosophy, 1926), another on "The Scientific Method" by John W. Campbell and a third appendix by Donald H. Rogers. These contributions are omitted from editions of Dianetics published since about the start of the 1980s.

== Reception ==
Despite its positive public reception, Dianetics was strongly criticized by scientists and medical professionals for its scientific deficiencies. The American Psychological Association passed a resolution about Dianetics in 1950 referring to "the fact that these claims are not supported by empirical evidence of the sort required for the establishment of scientific generalizations."

Dianetics received very negative reviews from the majority of sources. An early review in The New Republic summed up the book as "a bold and immodest mixture of complete nonsense and perfectly reasonable common sense, taken from long-acknowledged findings and disguised and distorted by a crazy, newly invented terminology" and warned of medical risks: "it may prove fatal to have put too much trust in the promises of this dangerous book." Frederick L. Schuman, political science professor at Williams College in Williamstown, Massachusetts became an ardent follower of Dianetics and wrote indignant letters to those who reviewed Dianetics adversely including the New Republic and The New York Times. Schuman wrote a favorable article on Dianetics in the April 1951 issue of Better Homes and Gardens. Dianetics received two favourable reviews from medical doctors.

Reviewing the book for Scientific American in 1951, physicist Isidor Isaac Rabi criticized the lack of either evidence or qualification, saying it "probably contains more promises and less evidence per page than has any publication since the invention of printing." An editorial in Clinical Medicine summarized the book as "a rumination of old psychological concepts, ... misunderstood and misinterpreted and at the same time adorned with the halo of the philosopher's stone and of an universal remedy", which had initiated "a new system of quackery of apparently considerable dimensions." According to Consumer Reports, the book over-extends scientific and cybernetic metaphors, and lacks the needed case reports, experimental replication and statistical data to back up its bold claims. Both Consumer Reports and Clinical Medicine also warned of the danger that the book would inspire unqualified people to harmfully intervene in others' mental problems.

These warnings were echoed by psychoanalyst Erich Fromm, who contrasted the sophistication of Sigmund Freud's theories with the "oversimplified" and "propagandistic" ideas offered by Dianetics. The latter's extremely mechanistic view of the mind had no need for human values, conscience or any authority other than Hubbard himself. A similar point was made by psychologist Rollo May in The New York Times, arguing that Dianetics unwittingly illustrates the fallacy of trying to understand human nature by invariant mathematical models taken from mechanics.

A review by semantics expert S. I. Hayakawa described Dianetics as fictional science, meaning that it borrows several linguistic techniques from science fiction to make fanciful claims seem plausible. Science fiction, he explained, relies on vividly conveying imaginary entities such as Martians and rayguns as though they were commonplace. Hubbard was doing this with his fantastic "discoveries", and the reviewer refers to the possibility that Hubbard might "succeed in concealing the distinction between his facts and his imaginings from himself."

The review in The American Journal of Psychiatry made similar observations: "[Hubbard's] previous efforts in the realm of scientific fiction writing have subtly prepared him for that nice ignorance of reality without which he could not have developed this epic. Certain bits of internal evidence such as his insistence on the frequency of abortions, his cruel fathers, his unfaithful mothers, his blundering doctors, his arrogance toward authority, may indicate the author's own systematized paranoid delusions."

Science writer Martin Gardner criticized the book's "repetitious, immature style" likening it to the grand pseudoscientific pronouncements of Wilhelm Reich. "Nothing in the book remotely resembles a scientific report", he wrote.

Aleksei Shliapov, a columnist at the Russian paper Izvestia, said about Dianetics, "I think that our politicians should acquaint themselves with this book, since here is, as it were, a technology for how to become popular, how to acquire influence among the masses without having to appear a significant personality."

More recently, the book has been described by Salon as "a fantastically dull, terribly written, crackpot rant", which covers a lack of credible evidence with mere insistence and The Daily Telegraph called it a "creepy bit of mind-mechanics" which would cause rather than cure depression.

When Hubbard wrote the book in 1950, homosexuality was considered a pathological illness and in 1951 the DSM I listed it under Sexual Deviation which stance was reflected in passages of Dianetics where homosexuality is considered a mental illness. Besides the homosexual as sexual pervert, Hubbard also includes things such as lesbianism, sexual sadism and all the catalog of Ellis and Krafft-Ebing as being actually "quite ill physically".

Robert Todd Carroll characterises Hubbard's work as essentially anti-science, in that the claims made in the books are based not on peer-reviewed observation of phenomena, with its attendant blind testing, control groups etc., but rather on an a priori decision that a phenomenon exists–followed by an attempt to prove its validity.

== Publication history ==
It is unclear how many editions there have been, but at least 60 printings are said to have been issued by 1988, almost all having been printed by the Church of Scientology and its related organizations.

Current editions are published by Bridge Publications and New Era Publications, Scientology-owned imprints. Over twenty million copies have been sold according to the cover of the latest paperback books. The following statement is included on the copyright page of all editions: "This book is part of the works of L. Ron Hubbard, who developed Dianetics spiritual healing technology and Scientology applied religious philosophy. It is presented to the reader as a record of observations and research into the nature of mind and spirit, and not a statement of claims made by the author".

According to Bridge Publications, 83 million copies of Dianetics were sold in the forty years after publication. According to Nielsen BookScan, the book has sold 52,000 copies between 2001 and 2005. The book has been very aggressively marketed, often in ways that are unusual for the book industry, for instance appearing as one of the twelve sponsors of the Goodwill Games under a $4 million agreement between Bridge Publications and Turner Broadcasting System. Bridge Publications also sponsors NASCAR racer and Scientologist Kenton Gray, who races as the "Dianetics Racing Team" and whose No. 27 Ford Taurus is decorated with Dianetics logos.

Various sources allege that the book's continued sales have been manipulated by the Church of Scientology and its related organizations ordering followers to buy up new editions to boost sales figures. According to a Los Angeles Times exposé published in 1990, "sales of Hubbard's books apparently got an extra boost from Scientology followers and employees of the publishing firm [Bridge Publications]. Showing up at major book outlets like B. Dalton and Waldenbooks, they purchased armloads of Hubbard's works, according to former employees." Members are asked to contribute by placing Dianetics in public libraries. However, Dianetics was not added to the collection of the Brooklyn Public Library on the basis of a negative review.

== Role in Scientology ==
Scientologists regard the publication of Dianetics: The Modern Science of Mental Health as a key historical event for their movement and the world, and refer to the book as Book One. In Scientology, years are numbered relative to the first publication of the book: 1990, for example, being "40 AD" (After Dianetics). The book is promoted as "a milestone for Man comparable to his discovery of fire and superior to his inventions of the wheel and the arch."

Dianetics is still heavily promoted today by the Church of Scientology and has been advertised widely on television and in print. Indeed, it has been alleged that the Church has asked its members to purchase large quantities of the book with their own money, or with money supplied by the Church, for the sole purpose of keeping the book on the New York Times Best Seller list. Hubbard described the book as a key asset for getting people in Scientology:

People who had read Book One and wanted Dianetics, when delivered enough Book One auditing, training or co-auditing, then started to reach for Scn [Scientology] services. Given sufficient quantity and quality of Book One, these people naturally started to WANT and reach for Scn services!

The Church of Scientology has been explicit about using Dianetics' sponsorship of the Goodwill Games to boost Scientology membership. The Church's internal journal for Scientologists, International Scientology News, has stated that:

In order to create an enormous international impact, Dianetics has become a major sponsor of the upcoming Goodwill Games ... All these dissemination actions are being done with the sole purpose of getting more and more people introduced to LRH's TECH so they will go into orgs [Scientology properties] and rapidly move up The Bridge to Total Freedom [advancing through Scientology's levels].

== Volcano imagery ==
2003 cover, featuring an erupting volcano

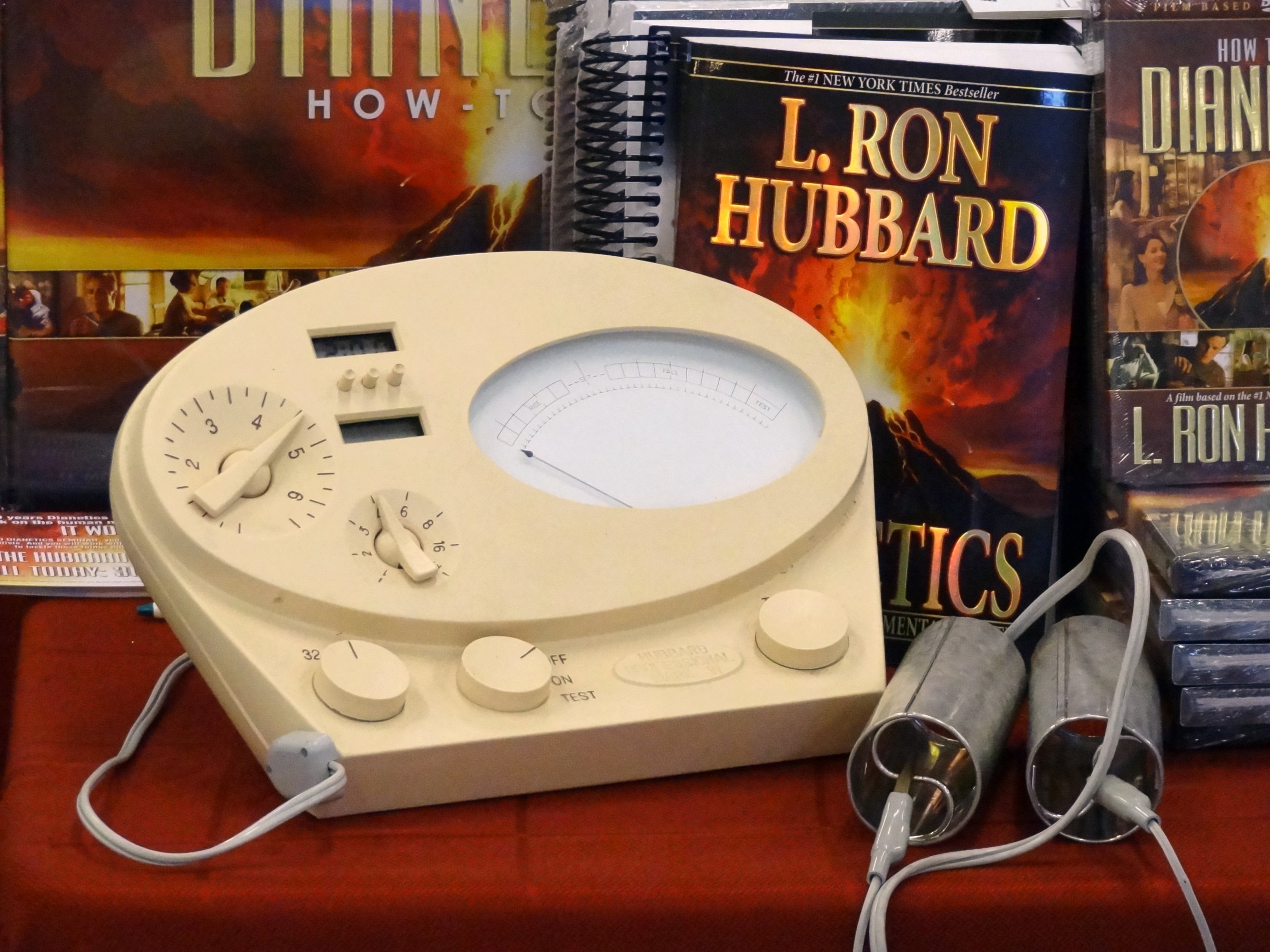
Volcano imagery dominates sidewalk book sales and "stress tests" to promote Dianetics and Scientology

Dianetics uses the image of an exploding volcano, both on the covers of post-1967 editions, and in advertising. In 1996, a giant billboard in Sydney, Australia, measured 33 m (100 ft) wide and 10 m (30 ft) high and depicted an erupting volcano with "non-toxic smoke".

Hubbard told his marketing staff that this imagery would make the books irresistible to purchasers by reactivating unconscious memories. According to Hubbard, the volcano recalls the incident in which galactic overlord Xenu placed billions of his people around Earth's volcanoes and killed them there by blowing them up with hydrogen bombs. Warren McShane, a representative of the Church of Scientology, confirmed in court that the volcano imagery is linked with the "catastrophe" wrought by Xenu.

Bent Corydon, a former Scientology mission holder, recounted that:

A special "Book Mission" was sent out to promote these books, now empowered and made irresistible by the addition of these supposedly overwhelming symbols or images. Organization staff were assured that if they simply held up one of the books, revealing its cover, that any bookstore owner would immediately order crateloads of them. A customs officer, seeing any of the book covers in one's luggage, would immediately pass one on through.

== See also ==
- Bibliography of Scientology
- Scientology beliefs and practices
- A Doctor's Report on Dianetics
