= The Bridge to Total Freedom =

Spiritual journey chart in Scientology

Bridge to Total Freedom
- Chart of the Bridge to Total Freedom
- Type: Spiritual progression system in Scientology
- Description: A hierarchical sequence of training and auditing steps intended to guide a thetan to higher states of awareness
- Introduced: May 5, 1965; 61 years ago
- Components: Training levels, auditing levels, OT levels
- Key texts: Scientology technical bulletins, course materials
- Associated controversies: High cost, secrecy of upper levels, allegations of coercive advancement

The Bridge to Total Freedom, also known as the bridge, is Scientology's primary action plan and road map to guide a person through the sequential steps to attain Scientology's concept of spiritual freedom. The chart which displays the bridge is called the Classification, Gradation and Awareness Chart. Displayed in every Scientology organization as an enormous poster using red ink, the comprehensive chart contains almost every service available within Scientology. Each step on the bridge has a price associated with it, and each level is a prerequisite for the next level above it.

== History ==
In 1950, L. Ron Hubbard wrote Dianetics: The Modern Science of Mental Health. In it, he used the analogy of bridge engineering: "We are here at a bridge between one state of Man and a next. We are above the chasm which divides a lower from a higher plateau and this chasm marks an artificial evolutionary step in the progress of Man. [...] In this handbook we have the basic axioms and a therapy which works. For God's sake, get busy and build a better bridge!"

In 1965, Hubbard codified his "Bridge" as a more systematic approach to moving Scientologists to the state of Clear. Hubbard added a series of steps he called "releases" which handled memory, communication, problems, "overts and withholds" (sins, crimes and secrets), upsets, and justifications for failure. The steps were numbered Grade 0 through Grade IV, and each step had a specific ability gained. (Note: Quotation: "O/Ws: Overts and withholds—crimes and secrets")

== Description ==
The Bridge to Total Freedom is represented by a large wall chart, printed with red ink on white paper. There are two main columns: "Training" on the left and "Processing" on the right.

Scientology's Bridge is divided into two tracks: the auditing track, by which members advance through the various levels of enlightenment, and the training track, by which members learn to audit others. Hubbard envisioned Scientologists progressing on both tracks, often simultaneously, and all Scientologists are required to learn how to audit in order to advance to the upper levels.

— Janet Reitman

A newcomer to Scientology starts the bridge at the bottom of the chart and rises through the levels, perhaps reaching the level of Clear, then continuing upward through the OT Levels to higher states of awareness and ability.

The section near the bottom of the chart covers the various routes onto the bridge which can include a communication course, a life improvement course, introductory auditing, and other basic services. The far left margin lists extra training courses that are available but which are not required for going up the bridge. Likewise, the far right margin lists extra auditing processes that a Scientologist can do that are not part of the steps up the bridge.

The terms "The Bridge to Total Freedom" and "Classification, Gradation and Awareness Chart" are somewhat synonymous, with the chart name being used more to specifically refer to the diagram, and "the bridge" being used more to express the concepts of the steps represented on the diagram. For example, when someone asks "Where are you on the bridge?" they are asking which step have you completed or are in the middle of. The word Classification refers to the large left column, "Training". Once a student has completed one of these training levels, they become a classed auditor. For example, completing the Class II course, a student becomes a Class II auditor. The word Gradation refers to the large right column, "Processing". In the 1965 version of the bridge, a much less comprehensive chart than is used today, the beginning Scientologist would move up through the "grades" to Clear. The word Awareness refers to the center area between the two large columns where there are 52 levels of awareness from Unexistence at the very bottom up to the state of Clear.

The training and processing sides go hand-in-hand for each level of the chart. For example, a student completing the Class III course (left column) is qualified to audit someone on Grade III (right column), and two students can train on a level (left column) and then co-audit each other on that same level (right column). Likewise, a Scientologist wanting to participate in Grade III (right column) will need an auditor who has trained at least to Class III (left column).

Though many Scientologists only ascend the processing side of the bridge, Hubbard maintained that a person needed to receive auditing and give counseling to another, and that 50% of the gains in Scientology were achieved through training as an auditor.

A major point on the bridge is the state of Clear. It is the last non-confidential step on the bridge, and Hugh Urban points out that people take different amounts of time to progress up the bridge depending on their personal circumstances and finances.

=== OT levels ===
The OT levels are confidential and one must be "invited" to do them. Some of the auditing levels are self-audited, and some require another auditor. The training levels for those who will audit others on the OT levels are also confidential and only available to those in the Sea Org. The OT levels are only available at certain organizations.

Although the chart lists 15 OT levels above the state of Clear, only seven were released during Hubbard's lifetime. (Note: Quotation: "Hubbard released the first of these advanced levels, OT I and II, and unveiled five higher levels over the next three years. Although the church lists fifteen of these advanced OT grades on its official "Bridge to Total Freedom," only seven or eight appear to have been completed before Hubbard's death.") OT VIII was released to the public in 1988, two years after Hubbard's 1986 death — to be performed only on Scientology's ship Freewinds. (Note: Quotation: "At that point (Hubbard's death), the highest level possible on the Bridge to Total Freedom was OT VII (OT VIII would not be introduced for another two years).) According to interviews performed by Rinder, Scientologists have described OT VIII as "less than overwhelming".

Many who had spent decades and hundreds of thousands of dollars to reach the pinnacle of the scientology Bridge were so disgusted when they finally got there that it was the last thing they did in scientology.

— Mike Rinder

Since 1986, Church of Scientology leader David Miscavige has dangled the hope of OT levels beyond VIII being released in the future, pending certain conditions, which have shifted over time. However, it has been widely reported that Hubbard never wrote OT IX and above; therefore, these levels do not actually exist. (Note: Quotation: "According to Marty Rathbun, there are no OT 9 and 10, let alone anything higher. The idea of OT 9 and 10 was a creation of Pat Broeker, dreamt up on the heels of the death of LRH to keep the masses from open revolt"—and to keep Miscavige from deposing Broeker immediately. ... He also said that neither OT 9 nor 10 was contained in Hubbard's auditing files.") (Note: Quotation: "Miscavige continues to this day to promise the release of the nonexistent OT IX and X—the 'real' OT levels—as another carrot at the end of the pole dangled in front of the donkeys. Miscavige learned this lesson well from the Hubbard playbook: make promises that give people hope for the future, or even a hope that what they thought they were going to achieve and failed to will soon be possible with another new breakthrough. Hubbard did this from 1950 until 1986, and Miscavige continued the mirage by releasing OT VIII in 1988 and then offering the promise of further OT levels with endless exhortations to the faithful to 'get ready for the release of OT IX and X' and an ever-shifting list of requirements for this to happen.")

== Costs ==
Each step on the bridge costs money, and each step is a prerequisite for the one that follows. (Note: Quotation: "In the scientology world, the carrot of ultimate spiritual enlightenment and happiness keeps the donkeys moving up the Bridge and, of course, paying more money. Nothing is free in scientology. Every level of the Bridge has an exact cost, with prices growing steeper the higher one ascends. [A high level called] NOTs also became a huge moneymaker.") Costs at the lowest (beginning) end of the bridge can be quite inexpensive, with the costs rising the higher you go on the bridge. The cost of going up the bridge has risen drastically over the years. In the late 1960s, shortly after the first OT levels were released, prices ranged from $75 to $875 per OT level. In the 1970s, the price for a complete OT package was around $3,000. By the 1990s, prices had risen to several thousand and even tens of thousands per level, with a conservative estimate of $300,000–$400,000 to complete up to OT VIII (in 1991 dollars).

Costs inflate further when the Church of Scientology orders Scientologists to re-do one or several steps they have already done, inserts a new step or requirement on the bridge, or management releases a new version of an old step, such as was done with the New Era Dianetics reissued in 1978, and OT VIII which was changed almost immediately after its release in 1988. Such practices are fairly common.

Those who cannot afford to pay the high costs are encouraged to join staff where they are promised their training and auditing would be free, called "enhancement". (Note: Quotation: "But most people who join it don't have that kind of money to spend. Many pay for their courses by leaving their jobs and going to work for Scientology in exchange for training units—often for a small salary besides ($40 a week for about 40 hours of work in New York).") The risk is that staff must sign a contract for the full amount of the services, and if they break their contract and leave staff, they are presented with a freeloader bill for the full price of all auditing and training services they received while on staff.

In 1971, Paulette Cooper wrote that the Church of Scientology used to extend credit at 6%, plus a 25% surcharge which would be returned if the loan was paid off on time. (Note: Quotation: "Those who didn't wish to break completely from their outside contacts, were able to get credit at one time, which the Church extended at six percent interest with a twenty-five percent surcharge returned if the note was paid on time.") In 1986, Stewart Lamont wrote that in the early to mid-1980s a Scientologist in England would loan money at 25%-30% to other Scientologists; he only loaned for bridge levels over £5,000 and that "every loan agreement is checked and approved by the Church of Scientology officially".

Members are told that refunds are possible if they are not satisfied, however refunds are difficult to obtain, come with conditions and, once paid, bar the members for any further services because demanding returns of money is considered a high crime, a suppressive act, and leads to being declared a suppressive person. (Note: Quotation: "Demanding the return of any or all donations made for standard training or processing actually received or received in part and still available but undelivered only because of departure of the person demanding (the donations must be refunded but this policy applies).") (Note: Quotation: "Scientologists get people to pay substantial fees by promising to refund their money if they are dissatisfied with Scientology—and they are quick to point out that no psychotherapist returns money if therapy proves unsuccessful (although they are just as quick to point out that they are not a form of therapy). In fact, the Scientologists haven't always returned the money either, and have sometimes set up certain conditions that have made it difficult for people to collect...")

Mike Rinder wrote in his book that promises of ultimate spiritual enlightenment and happiness are the "carrots" that keep people on the bridge.

== See also ==
- Auditing - the counseling processes in Scientology
- Clear - the state of a person without a reactive mind
- Operating Thetan - a state of being with a high level of ability and awareness
