= Alt.religion.scientology =

Usenet newsgroup

alt.religion.scientology, also known as a.r.s or ARS, was a Usenet newsgroup started in 1991 to discuss the controversial beliefs of Scientology and the activities of the Church of Scientology. The newsgroup became the focal point of an aggressive campaign known as Scientology versus the Internet, which took place online and in the courts.

== History ==
On July 17, 1991, the alt.religion.scientology newsgroup was created by Scientology-critic Scott Charles Goehring after a discussion with his then girlfriend and a third party. Goehring describes starting the newsgroup "because I felt Usenet needed a place to disseminate the truth about this half-assed religion" and in part as a joke.

The original Usenet newgroup message used to create the newsgroup was formatted in a manner to disguise the actual identity of the poster. A bogus email address, "miscaviage@flag.sea.org" (a misspelling of "David Miscavige", the leader of Scientology), was inserted into the newsgroup creation message. Because of this, persons speaking in favor of Scientology frequently claim that "a forgery" was used to create the newsgroup. Scientology has used this argument in its requests to have the entire newsgroup removed from Usenet, but this argument has been nearly unanimously rejected by system administrators and ISPs alike.

ARS was a popular online forum in the 1990s, and at the time was the largest organized cult opposition. The Church of Scientology tried everything it could to shut down the group, but failed. In the early 2000s, ARS became available through Google Groups with their acquisition of Deja News, and as of 2024 ARS was still available online as an archive.

In the mid-2000s, a proliferation of new websites, blogs, and internet forums made ARS functionally obsolete. The persistence of ARS showed that online groups could survive attempts at deletion, accommodate anonymous participation that could not be silenced, and equip users with a platform for the release of documents. ARS "provided the first proof that 'leaderless resistance' organizations could have an impact on Scientology".

Additionally, attempts to disrupt ARS simply added to the anti-Scientology movement additional groups dedicated to "upholding truth, transparency, freedom of information, and other lofty ideological goals".

== Disruption by Scientology ==
=== Attempts to delete the group ===
In 1995, Scientology lawyers tried to get ARS removed from the internet. Scientology lawyer Helena Kobrin attempted to remove the entire newsgroup from Usenet. On January 11, 1995, an rmgroup message (a command designed to remove a newsgroup) was posted to Usenet containing the following statement:

We request that you remove the alt.religion.scientology newsgroup from your site. The reasons for requesting its removal are: (1) It was started with a forged message; (2) not discussed on alt.config; (3) it has the name "scientology" in its title which is a trademark and is misleading, as a.r.s. is mainly used for flamers to attack the Scientology religion; (4) it has been and continues to be heavily abused with copyright and trade secret violations and serves no purpose other than condoning these illegal practices.

— Helena K. Kobrin, Counsel for trademark and copyright owner

This message was largely ignored (and openly protested) by system administrators who carried the newsgroup. It also led to a declaration of war by hacker group Cult of the Dead Cow. Rather than being removed from Usenet, the newsgroup exploded in popularity due to the not-yet-named Streisand effect phenomenon. For a period during the first half of 1995, the newsgroup was one of the most popular and active on the entire Internet, with message traffic greater than the vast majority of newsgroups, averaging 65,000-75,000 users a month and 500-600 posts a day.

=== Cancel bots ===
Articles posted to Usenet could be canceled by a special control message (normally from the original sender). Starting in 1995, large numbers of rogue cancels were posted to ARS by a cancelbot dubbed "Cancelbunny", mainly against critical articles containing portions of the "Advanced Technology" documents. To counteract this, a program called "Lazarus" was created to alert original posters of the deletion, suggesting they repost their canceled message. A group of techies nicknamed the Rabbit Hunters traced the cancel requests to a single user, who got shut down, and later to a few others that had posted pro-Scientology content, leading to a report to the FBI.

Kobrin took to emailing users, threatening them with legal action if they didn't remove their posts and stop posting copyrighted material. The demands went unanswered, postings of even more extensive excerpts of Church of Scientology material ensued, and more non-usenet websites were created.

According to the main Rabbit Hunter, "Half of the people on a.r.s. now are there because they're outraged about the cancel messages".

=== Flooding the newsgroup ===
In an attempt to "drown out criticism of the church", pro-Scientology forces tried to effectively disable ARS by flooding it with messages until it was unusable or too expensive to read for those with slow connections. The first floods started in May 1996 and were articles containing excerpts from the public relations book What is Scientology? Later, the messages simply repeated earlier posts. One of the flooders was tracked as originating through Yale, and Yale blocked the spammer account. In a nine-day period, an estimated 20,000 messages were sent and Yale blocked access to ARS.

== Activity ==
In 2006, alt.religion.scientology was one of the more popular newsgroups on Usenet, averaging three to four hundred messages per day. The total number of readers is unknown, but Google reports over 8,800 subscribers to the newsgroup through Google Groups.

Critics of Scientology claim that Scientologists are forbidden from reading or accessing the newsgroup. As evidence, they point to the software package sometimes dubbed "Scieno Sitter" by critics. This software package, described as an "Internet filter", was part of a "Web starter kit" distributed by the Church. The stated purpose of the starter kit was to make it as easy as possible for Scientologists to create personal websites (hosted by the Church) promoting Scientology. The Church did not disclose the other purpose of the starter kit: the "Scieno Sitter" program blocks users from accessing the newsgroup alt.religion.scientology, as well as many Web sites containing information critical of Scientology, and references to the names of many vocal critics of the organization. If terms matching the software's list of forbidden words appear, the software may blank them from a web page, kick the user from the chatroom where the words appeared, or even shut down their browser altogether.

== See also ==
- Scieno Sitter
- Sporgery, common Usenet phenomenon named by an a.r.s. regular
