= Timeline of Scientology =

This is a Timeline of Scientology and its forerunner Dianetics, particularly its foundation and development by author L. Ron Hubbard as well as general publications, articles, books and other milestones.

== 1938 ==
- L. Ron Hubbard authors a manuscript called Excalibur which contains ideas incorporated into Dianetics and, later, Scientology.

== 1949 ==
- First published work on Dianetics appeared in the Winter/Spring issue of The Explorers Journal entitled "Terra Incognita: The Mind". At this time, he offered his findings on the mind to both the American Medical Association and the American Psychiatric Association. Both organizations rejected them.

== 1950s ==
=== 1950 ===
- April: Hubbard Dianetic Research Foundation formed by Hubbard and John W. Campbell.
- May: Dianetics: Evolution of a Science was published in Astounding Science Fiction, whose editor was John W. Campbell, an early Dianetics enthusiast.
- May 9: Book Dianetics: The Modern Science of Mental Health published.
- June: Hubbard Dianetic Research Foundation established in Elizabeth, New Jersey.
- August: Hubbard held a failed demonstration to a Los Angeles audience where he unsuccessfully presented a young woman (Note: The woman's name was variously reported as Sonya/Sonia/Sonja Bianci/Bianca or Ann Singer) as the world's first Dianetics Clear.
- October: Medical doctor and Dianetics enthusiast Joseph A. Winter resigns from HDRF over the issue of past lives.

=== 1951 ===
- Joseph A. Winter's book A Doctor's Report on Dianetics is published.
- January: HDRF accused of "operating a school for treatment of disease without a license" in New Jersey.
- August: Science of Survival book is published.
- Hubbard begins using E-Meter.

=== 1952 ===
- February: After learning that the Hubbard Dianetic Foundation of Wichita, Kansas would be liable for the debts of the defunct Hubbard Dianetic Research Foundation of Elizabeth, New Jersey, the board of directors, led by Don Purcell, voted to file for voluntary bankruptcy over Hubbard's objections. Hubbard forms a rival Hubbard College, also in Wichita, and disputes control of the copyrights of the Dianetics materials.
- May: Hubbard publicly announces the formal establishment of the philosophy of Scientology and the formation of the Hubbard Association of Scientologists, demonstrates the E-meter, and moves to Phoenix, Arizona. Phoenix is considered the "birthplace of Scientology."
- July: What to Audit (later renamed to Scientology: A History of Man) is published.
- September: Early Dianetics supporter Joseph Winter M.D. breaks with Hubbard, convinced "that it is dangerous for laymen to try to audit each other".

=== 1953 ===
- Church of Scientology, Church of American Science and Church of Spiritual Engineering incorporated in Elizabeth, New Jersey by L. Ron Hubbard. Co-signatories were Henrietta Hubbard, L. Ron Hubbard Jr., John Galusha, Verna Greenough and Barbara Bryan. Named as trustees of the Church of Scientology were L. Ron Hubbard, Mary Sue Hubbard (not present), and John Galusha.

=== 1954 ===
- February 18: First incorporation of a Church of Scientology in California (changes its name in 1956 to Church of Scientology of California).
- December 24: Hubbard announced Scientology is a religion.

=== 1955 ===
- April: The Hubbard Association of Scientologists International holds the First Australian Scientology Congress in Prahran, Victoria, Australia.
- July: The Founding Church of Scientology was organized in Washington, D.C.

=== 1956 ===
- Publication of Fundamentals of Thought

=== 1957 ===
- The Internal Revenue Service grants a tax exemption to the Church of Scientology of California (CSC).

=== 1959 ===
- Hubbard moved to England and bought Saint Hill Manor in Sussex, from which he would direct international operations and expansion until 1967.
- Ronald DeWolf, aka "Nibs", Hubbard's oldest son leaves Scientology.

== 1960s ==
=== 1960 ===
- April 30: David Miscavige is born.

=== 1963 ===
- January 4: The US Food and Drug Administration raided the Founding Church of Scientology and seized approximately 100 of their E-meters as illegal medical devices. The devices are now required to carry a disclaimer saying that they are a purely religious artifact. They are used in a Scientology counseling technique known as "auditing".

=== 1964 ===
- Harry Thompson creates "amprinistics" and touts it as a better technique than Scientology without the heavy ethics; promotes it directly to Scientologists; Jack Horner joins; Hubbard declares the group "fair game".

=== 1965 ===
- The Church of Scientology was banned in several Australian states, starting with Victoria. The ban was based on the Anderson Report, which found that the auditing process involved "command" hypnosis, in which the hypnotist assumes "positive authoritative control" over the patient."
- Classification, Gradation and Awareness Chart released in East Grinstead, United Kingdom

=== 1966 ===
- British inquiry starts, which led to the Foster Report.
- Narconon program founded.
- Guardian's Office founded.
- August 1966 - OT I released.
- September 1966 - OT II released.
- John McMaster announced as first true clear.

=== 1967 ===
- The IRS strips the Church of Scientology in California, Scientology's headquarters, of its tax-exempt status, asserting that its activities are commercial and operated for the benefit of Mr. Hubbard, rather than charitable or religious reasons.
- OT III is made available to Scientologists. This level of Operating Thetan contains the story of Xenu, which becomes a source of enormous controversy for Scientology from the 1990s onward.
- The Sea Organization (or Sea Org) officially established.

=== 1968 ===
- January 1: The first Advanced Organization, offering the advanced levels of Scientology to the public, was established aboard the Royal Scotman, the flagship of the Sea Organization. (This ship was later renamed the Apollo.)
- Introduction to Scientology Ethics is published.
- August 1968 – Freedom Magazine Founded by Church of Scientology.
- OT IV, V and VI released.

=== 1969 ===
- FDA wins decision ordering destruction of E-meters seized in 1963. The U.S. court of appeals reversed on appeal recognizing e-meters as a "religious artefact" as long as they're labelled as ineffective in treating illness.
- Standard Dianetics released.
- Citizens Commission on Human Rights (CCHR) founded in the United States.
- South African government starts a Commission of Inquiry into Scientology.

== 1970s ==
=== 1970 ===
- OT VII released.
- February 22: Celebrity Centre in Los Angeles founded.
- Criminon founded.
- November: Hubbard begins delivery of Flag Executive Briefing Course (FEBC)
- Personal Spiritual Freedoms Foundation – later called Dianology and then Eductivism, established by Jack Horner
- Scientology: The Now Religion published by journalist George Malko

=== 1971 ===
- June 25: Suspicious death of Susan Meister aboard the Apollo.
- The FDA is ordered to return the materials and E-meters seized during the 1963 raid.
- Foster Report (British inquiry) is published.
- Paulette Cooper publishes her book The Scandal of Scientology.

=== 1972 ===
- Applied Scholastics founded.

=== 1973 ===
- Rehabilitation Project Force established.
- FDA returns seized materials.

=== 1974 ===
- January 23, 1974 – Introspection Rundown released.

=== 1975 ===
- Scientologists buy former Fort Harrison Hotel and old Bank of Clearwater.
- Relocated Flag management from sea to Clearwater.
- Scientology is recognized as a non-profit organization in South Africa, despite the 1972 report of a formal government Commission of Inquiry that recommended otherwise.

=== 1976 ===
- Suicide of Quentin Hubbard.

=== 1977 ===
- July 7: Various locations of the Church of Scientology are raided by the FBI.

=== 1978 ===
- New Era Dianetics released.
- New OT V released.
- Gilman Hot Springs property purchased.
- Hubbard writes training films.

=== 1979 ===
- As a result of FBI raids, eleven senior staff of the Guardian's Office were convicted of obstructing justice, burglary of government offices, and theft of documents and government property. (See Operation Snow White)
- March: Hubbard Mark VI E-meter released.
- December: An estimated 3,000 gather at Clearwater City Hall to protest the Church of Scientology coming to Clearwater. Across the street, Scientologists stage a counter rally, dressed as clowns and wearing animal costumes.
- December: Purification Rundown released.

== 1980s ==
=== 1980 ===
- St. Petersburg Times publishes a series of articles on Scientology.
- Acquisition of the former White Rats Club building at 227 West 46th in the Broadway Theater District in New York City. The building was built in 1912 and the Church of Scientology acquired it from the Seventh-day Adventist Church.
- January – New OT IV released.
- August – Golden Era Productions established.
- September – New OT VI and OT VII released.

=== 1981 ===
- February – The Way to Happiness is published.
- November 19 – Church of Scientology International (CSI) founded.
- December – Scientology Missions International founded.
- Gerry Armstrong leaves the Church of Scientology.

=== 1982 ===
- Clearwater's government holds hearings to explore allegations that the Church of Scientology is a cult.
- May – Church of Spiritual Technology Incorporated.
- Battlefield Earth published.

=== 1983 ===
- The High Court of Australia overturns the Scientology ban, declaring that "The applicant has easily discharged the onus of showing that it is religious. The conclusion that it is a religious institution entitled to the tax exemption is irresistible."
- The Church of Scientology of Toronto is raided. (See R. v. Church of Scientology of Toronto)
- December – Office of Special Affairs International formed.

=== 1985 ===
- The Church of Scientology acquires yacht "Bohème" and renames it to "Freewinds".
- October: First of ten volumes of Mission Earth published.

=== 1986 ===
- January 24: Hubbard dies at his ranch near San Luis Obispo, California.

=== 1987 ===
- David Miscavige becomes Chairman of the Board of RTC.

== 1990s ==
=== 1991 ===
- After the completion of a 4-year long program to reissue the books and courses of Dianetics and Scientology, a general amnesty is declared for members.
- September – Streamlined Bridge to Total Freedom released (grade chart).

=== 1992 ===
- June: The Church of Scientology is found guilty on two counts of breach of the public trust in Ontario, Canada in R. v. Church of Scientology of Toronto and fined $250,000. Seven members are also convicted.

=== 1993 ===
- December: The Internal Revenue Service of the United States grants full religious recognition and tax exemption to all Scientology Churches, missions and social betterment groups in that country.

=== 1994 ===
- December 24: a number of Scientology's confidential Operating Thetan documents are published on the newsgroup alt.religion.scientology through an anonymous remailer. This marks the beginning of Scientology's online activities, often referred to as Scientology versus the Internet.

=== 1995 ===
- July 20: The Supreme Court of Canada upholds the largest libel award in Canadian history against the Church of Scientology. (See Hill v. Church of Scientology of Toronto)
- December 5: Lisa McPherson, a 36-year-old Scientologist dies after 17 days under the care of Church of Scientology Flag Service Organization. Police begin an investigation the following day.

=== 1996 ===
- The Church of Scientology releases the Golden Age of Tech program with the express goal of improving and speeding up the training of its practitioners.
- On 21 November 1996, Don Jason, a Scientology Chief Officer with prior authority over hundreds of staff in Clearwater, Florida, escaped from the Church of Scientology by jumping off their 440-foot-long ship named Freewinds that was docked at the time in the Bahamas. As he had escaped the Church of Scientology (Scientology vernacular: "blown") earlier that year in August, he was barred from leaving the Freewinds and his passport confiscated. Running from the ship, he jumped into a waiting taxicab, closing the door on a Scientology guard's hand, and screamed to the driver: "I'm being held against my will! Take me to a g-- d---airport!"

=== 1997 ===
- February: Lisa McPherson's family files a wrongful-death lawsuit against the Church of Scientology.
- The Church of Scientology, operating as the Greek Center of Applied Philosophy, is ordered closed in Greece. Decision upheld in 1998.

=== 1998 ===
- Late summer: Scientologists are mailed software on CDs, and told that the program was for building "I am a Scientologist" web sites. The CD covertly installed censorship software on their computers which would block web access to sites critical of Scientology. (See Scieno Sitter)
- November: After reviewing the Lisa McPherson case for 11 months, State Attorney Bernie McCabe charges the Church of Scientology with two felonies: practicing medicine without a license and abuse of a disabled adult.
- November: The Church (Note: Use of "Church" or "the Church" is a common shortened form of "Church of Scientology"; see The Church (Scientology).) begins construction of the Flag Building, launching a $160-million construction project in downtown Clearwater, Florida.

=== 1999 ===
- The Charity Commission for England and Wales denies the Church of Scientology's application for charitable status, ruling that it is not a religion and that there is no established "public benefit arising out of the practice of Scientology". The Church does not appeal the decision.
- November: The government of Sweden declares that the Church of Scientology is a charitable, non-profit organization with a religious purpose. A year later, the Church's ministers are granted the right to perform marriages, completing official recognition as a church in Sweden.
- Bob Minton, a banker critical of Scientology, starts a protest organization called the Lisa McPherson Trust. The organization picketed Scientology buildings on the anniversary of Lisa McPherson's death. The group was disbanded in November 2001.

== 2000s ==
=== 2000 ===
- March: The Italian Supreme Court upholds Scientology's religious status in Italy while reaffirming that Narconon is a non-tax-exempt for-profit business.
- Scientology ministers are granted the right to perform marriages in South Africa.
- In the United Kingdom, the Church of Scientology is exempted from value added tax on the basis that it is a not-for-profit body.
- June: McCabe drops the criminal case against the Church of Scientology, noting that the medical examiner's change of opinion about the cause of Lisa McPherson's death undercuts the prosecution's effort to prove the criminal case beyond a reasonable doubt.

=== 2002 ===
- The government of New Zealand issues an official decree fully recognizing the Church of Scientology of New Zealand as an exempt religious and charitable organization.
- The Austrian tax office concludes that the work of the Church of Scientology in Vienna is for the public benefit rather than anyone's personal profit, and grants that church tax-exempt status as a charitable religious organization.
- July: A Paris judge rules that a 13-year-old case against the Church of Scientology alleging fraud and illegal practice of medicine cannot go to trial, due to lack of progress in the investigation. The judge rules that the statute of limitations has expired.

=== 2003 ===
- March: The National Ministry of the Interior for Taiwan recognizes the Church of Scientology of Taiwan as a charitable religious institution, officially adding it to the rolls of the country's recognized religions.

=== 2004 ===
- May: The Church of Scientology and the estate of Lisa McPherson reach a private settlement.

=== 2005 ===
- The U.S. Department of State's 2005 Report on International Religious Freedom announces that the Church of Scientology has been registered as a religious group by the Kyrgyzstan State Commission on Religious Affairs.
- David Miscavige announces the Golden Age of Knowledge, a Church program intended to make all Scientology materials available. It starts with the release of 18 congresses.

=== 2006 ===
- Scientology applies for status as a religious confessional community in Austria, but later withdraws its application.

=== 2007 ===
- In the next major step of the Golden Age of Knowledge program, 18 revised books and 11 lecture series are released.
- April: In Church of Scientology Moscow versus Russia, the European Court of Human Rights rules against Russia for repeatedly refusing to consider the Moscow Church of Scientology's application for the status of a legally valid religious association. The court finds that the reasons given to deny re-registration of the Church of Scientology by the justice department and endorsed by the Moscow courts have no legal basis.
- A Belgian state prosecutor recommends that a case should be brought against 12 physical persons associated with Scientology and two legal entities – the Belgian Church of Scientology and Scientology's Office of Human Rights – on counts of extortion, fraud, organized crime, obstruction of medical practice, illegal medical practice, invasion of privacy, conspiracy and commercial infractions like abusive contractual clauses. The proposal is referred to an administrative court who is to decide at a later date whether charges will be brought.
- October 31: Scientology is formally recognized as a religion in Spain
- November: Scientology is officially recognized as a religion in Portugal.
- December 3: South Africa grants the Church of Scientology tax exemption and issues a certificate recognizing it as a "Public Benefit Organisation".
- December 7: German federal and state interior ministers formally express the view that the Scientology organization continues to pursue anti-constitutional goals and ask Germany's domestic intelligence agencies to collect and evaluate the necessary information that would be required for a possible judicial inquiry aimed at banning the organization. The move is criticized by politicians from all parts of the political spectrum, with legal experts expressing concern that an attempt to ban the organization would most likely fail in the courts. This view is echoed by the German intelligence agencies, who warn that a ban would be doomed to fail.
- March: Mike Rinder, former senior executive, escapes Scientology.

=== 2008 ===
- January 14: A video created by the Church of Scientology was posted on YouTube featuring Tom Cruise talking about various Scientology topics including "Keeping Scientology Working" or KSW". More details are visible with "Project Chanology".
- January 15: "Tom Cruise: An Unauthorized Biography" by Andrew Morton is released.
- June 4: Mark Bunker, American politician, broadcast journalist, videographer and documentary filmmaker, conducts and uploads an interview with Actor Jason Beghe who defected the Church of Scientology in 2007.
- Internet-based group Anonymous launches Project Chanology, a worldwide protest against the Church of Scientology, which drew about 7,000 people in more than 93 cities on February 10, 2008.
- November: Germany drops its attempt to ban Scientology, after finding insufficient evidence of illegal or unconstitutional activity. However, monitoring of Scientology's activities by the German intelligence services continues.

=== 2009 ===
- June 21: The Tampa Bay Times publishes the first article of The Truth Rundown with multiple parts including alleged physical abuse, verbal abuse, imprisonment and torture by the leader David Miscavige and details on the Lisa McPherson Case.
- October 26: Paul Haggis goes public with resigning from the Church of Scientology primarily over the policy of disconnection and Scientology's views on homosexuality based on their policies. In 1950, Hubbard had published Dianetics: The Modern Science of Mental Health, introducing his "science of the mind". In the book, Hubbard classified homosexuality as an illness or sexual perversion, citing contemporary psychiatric and psychological textbooks to support his view:
  "The sexual pervert (and by this term Dianetics, to be brief, includes any and all forms of deviation in Dynamic II [i.e. sexuality] such as homosexuality, lesbianism, sexual sadism, etc., and all down the catalog of Ellis and Krafft-Ebing) is actually quite ill physically...he is very far from culpable for his condition, but he is also far from normal and extremely dangerous to society..."
  Hubbard further defined perversion in his 1951 book Science of Survival, where he introduced the concept of the "tone scale", a means of classifying individuals and human behavior on a chart running from +40 (the most beneficial) to −40 (the least beneficial).
- October 27: Six Scientology officials are convicted of fraud in France.
- November 5: The book Blown for good: Behind the Iron Curtain of Scientology by Marc Headley is released.

== 2010s ==
=== 2010 ===
- Scientology churches open in Brussels, Quebec, Las Vegas, Johannesburg, Los Angeles, Mexico City, Pasadena and Washington State.

=== 2011 ===
- Lawrence Wright's story on the New Yorker reporting on the Church of Scientology is published.

=== 2012 ===
- March 25: After 42 years Ronald T. Miscavige, Father of the leader David Miscavige, escapes from the Gold base.
- September: Tony Ortega, Blogger, Journalist & Author, launches freelance blog entitled "The Underground Bunker" that is focused solely on Scientology, after reporting on the Church of Scientology since 1995.

=== 2013 ===
- January 17: "Going Clear: Scientology, Hollywood and the Prison of Belief" by Lawrence Wright is released.
- Scientology Ideal Org in Kaohsiung, Taiwan opens.
- Flag Building unveiled in Clearwater, Florida after 15 years of construction.
- Scientology released its largest training program – The Golden Age of Tech Phase II.
- UK recognizes Scientology as a religion and allows Scientology wedding.
- Leah Remini goes public with leaving the Church of Scientology.

=== 2014 ===
- November 13: Upload Video "Scientologists celebrity centre gala 2005" on YouTube. In the video Giovanni Ribisi states (at 2:08) that Scientology is a "pragmatic religion" and members can have any religious denomination. This statement contradicts the required criteria that Scientology confirmed to the IRS US, that Scientology was in fact its own religion and solely based on the works of L. Ron Hubbard.

=== 2015 ===
- The film documentary Going Clear by Alex Gibney is released.
- May: Tony Ortega released his book about Paulette Cooper entitled The Unbreakable Miss Lovely. Cooper is an American author and journalist who in 1968 wrote an article about Scientology for British magazine Queen. Despite receiving death threats, she went ahead and published a book titled The Scandal of Scientology. Cooper uploaded the book on her homepage as a free read.
- The documentary My Scientology Movie by Louis Theroux is released in London.
- The book Troublemaker: Surviving Hollywood and Scientology by Leah Remini is released.

=== 2016 ===
- May 3: Ruthless: Scientology, My Son David Miscavige, and Me by Ronald T. Miscavige is released.
- August 8: Joe Rogan Experience #835 uploads podcast episode with Louis Theroux in which his documentary on Scientology is explained.
- November 29: "Leah Remini: Scientology and the Aftermath" a documentary series about the Church of Scientology explained through personal experiences of various defectors, journalists and others, is released via A&E. A statement regarding the docuseries by the Church of Scientology was published on their website, scientologynews.org, on November 26, 2016.

=== 2017 ===
- January 31: On an episode of the Joe Rogan Experience (episode #908) guest star Leah Remini explains her experience with OT III, a level on The Bridge to Total Freedom. The Bridge to Total Freedom is a chart or process used by the Church of Scientology to describe members advancement).
- February 2: Documentary and upload by Real Stories "Scientology: Mysterious Deaths (Religious Documentary) | Real Stories".
- February 4: In an interview Giovanni Ribisi describes Scientology as an "applied religious philosophy".

=== 2018 ===
- March 12: The Scientology Network is launched and made available on Apple TV, Amazon's Fire TV, Roku and Google Chromecast.

=== 2019 ===
- February 11: "Where is the missing wife of Scientology's ruthless leader?" documentary by 60 Minutes Australia is released
- April 3: A convicted murderer named Kenneth Wayne Thompson blames upbringing as a Scientologist as reason for murders.

== 2020s ==
=== 2020 ===
- April: The Church of Scientology announced an online prevention center in response to the COVID-19 pandemic.

=== 2021 ===
- August 17: Laura Prepon has not practiced Scientology since 2016.

=== 2022 ===
- October 11: Danny Masterson's criminal trial for the alleged sexual assault against three women started. Before and during the trial many possible aspects of the involvement of the Church of Scientology were discussed in and out of court.

=== 2023 ===
- May: Danny Masterson is convicted on two of the three counts of forcible rape in a second trial.
- September 7: Masterson sentenced to an indefinite period of 30 years to life in prison.
- November: The Church of Scientology holds its first major event in four years, after a hiatus starting during the COVID-19 pandemic. The Church routinely holds four major events per year: a New Year's event in Los Angeles; the LRH Birthday event (March 13 in Clearwater, Florida); a week aboard the Freewinds ship in the summer; and the IAS event in England.

== See also ==
- History of Dianetics and Scientology
- Timeline of L. Ron Hubbard
