= Life of L. Ron Hubbard from 1950 to 1953 =

From 1950 to 1953, Hubbard led the Dianetics Movement, which published, promoted, and provided an alternative talk therapy called "auditing".

In 1950 L. Ron Hubbard published his Dianetics: The Modern Science of Mental Health and started lecturing to audiences about Dianetics technique. The related organizations fell into debt and filed for bankruptcy, during which he lost the rights to Dianetics and his book. Hubbard introduced the "electropsychometer" (or E-meter). Having lost Dianetics, he invented Scientology and Operating Thetan, a level above the Clear state he said Dianetics could achieve. Hubbard decided Scientology was religious in nature and reorganized his Scientology companies into religious organizations. During this time period, Hubbard's [second] wife Sara gave birth to a daughter, Hubbard started showing signs of mental problems, including kidnapping his daughter, after which Sara divorced him, claiming abuse. Hubbard then married Mary Sue with whom he eventually had four more children.

By 1953, Hubbard rebranded his efforts as the Church of Scientology.

== Origins of Dianetics in science-fiction "supermen" and false medical claims ==
Hubbard wrote in January 1949 that he was working on a "book of psychology" about "the cause and cure of nervous tension", which he was going to call The Dark Sword, Excalibur or Science of the Mind.

Inspired by science-fiction of his friend Robert Heinlein, Hubbard announced plans to write a book which would claim to "make supermen". On March 8, 1949, Hubbard wrote to Robert A. Heinlein from Savannah, Georgia; In that letter, Hubbard connected his upcoming book to Heinlein's earlier work Coventry, in which a utopian government has the technology to psychologically "cure" criminals of violent personality traits, turning them into psionic supermen called "nul-A's". He wrote to Heinlein:

Well, you didn't specify in your book what actual reformation took place in the society to make supermen. Got to thinking about it other day. The system is Excalibur. It makes nul A's.

Hubbard announced to the public that there existed a superhuman condition which he called the state of "Clear". He claimed people in that state would have a perfectly functioning mind with an improved IQ and photographic memory. The "Clear" would be cured of physical ailments ranging from poor eyesight to the common cold, which Hubbard asserted were purely psychosomatic.

In a 1949 letter to Forrest Ackerman, Hubbard promises his upcoming work will give Ackerman the power to "rape women without their knowing it, communicate suicide messages to your enemies as they sleep, sell the Arroyo Seco Parkway to the mayor for cash, evolve the best way of protecting or destroying communism". Hubbard admits he has "not decided whether to destroy the Catholic church or merely start a new one." Hubbard discussed returning to the concepts of his 1938 unpublished manuscript Excalibur, writing: "Don’t know why I suddenly got the nerve to go into this again and let it loose. It’s probably either a great love or an enormous hatred of humanity.[...] I would now and then decide [to] use it and start right in to apply and I would lose my nerve. But lo! courage rose and the book is going out before it sinks again."

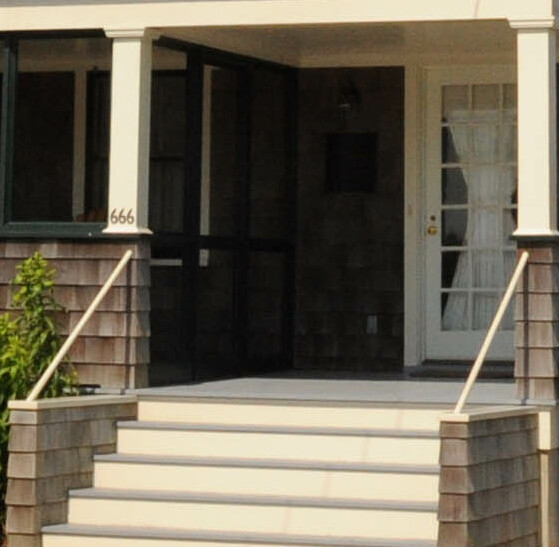
Hubbard and Sara moved into a cottage at Bay Head, New Jersey to finish writing Dianetics. The cottage at 666 East Avenue is now on the National Register of Historic Places. In a 1983 interview, Hubbard's son Nibs explained: "[My father] thought of himself as the Beast 666 incarnate..."

To promote his upcoming book, Hubbard enlisted his longtime-editor John W. Campbell, who had a long-standing fascination with fringe psychologies and psychic powers ("psionics"). Campbell invited Hubbard and Sara to move into a cottage at Bay Head, New Jersey, not far from his own home at Plainfield. Campbell, in turn, recruited an acquaintance, medical doctor Joseph Winter, to help promote the book. Campbell wrote Winter to extoll Hubbard, claiming that Hubbard had worked with nearly 1000 cases and cured every single one, healing "Institutionalized schizophrenics, apathies, manics, depressives, perverts, stuttering, neuroses—in all.. ulcers, arthritis, [and] asthma."

Journalist Charlie Nairn, who filmed an interview with Hubbard in 1968, claimed that in a prior off-camera meeting, Hubbard acknowledged that 'it started out purely as a way to make money' but 'he became fascinated by catching people, especially clever people' (Nairn's words). Nairn recalled: "I remember him specifically talking about two medical doctors, [who got involved in Dianetics] as if they should have known better. I remember a sense of triumph from him over this idea – as if he felt some of his victims were maybe brighter than he was – but that they were needy, gullible – that he understood the human animal and its ‘needs’ – exploitable needs – backwards."

The birth of Hubbard's second daughter Alexis Valerie, delivered by Winter on March 8, 1950, came in the middle of the preparations to launch Dianetics. In an editorial, Campbell said: "Its power is almost unbelievable; it proves the mind not only can but does rule the body completely; following the sharply defined basic laws set forth, physical ills such as ulcers, asthma and arthritis can be cured, as can all other psychosomatic ills."

The basic content of Dianetics was a rehash of Psychoanalysis. Like Freud, Hubbard taught that the brain recorded memories (or "engrams") which were stored in the unconscious mind (which Hubbard restyled "the reactive mind"). Past memories could be triggered later in life, causing psychological, emotional, or even physical problems. By sharing their memories with a friendly listener (or "auditor"), a person could overcome their past pain and thus cure themselves. Through Dianetics, Hubbard claimed that most illnesses were psychosomatic and caused by engrams, including arthritis, dermatitis, allergies, asthma, coronary difficulties, eye trouble, bursitis, ulcers, sinusitis and migraine headaches. He further claimed that dianetic therapy could treat these illnesses, and also included cancer and diabetes as conditions that Dianetic research was focused on.

== Initial success of Dianetics and subsequent collapse ==
Dianetics was launched in Astounding's May 1950 issue and on May 9, Hubbard's companion book Dianetics: The Modern Science of Mental Health was published by Hermitage House. Dianetics was an immediate commercial success and sparked what Martin Gardner calls "a nationwide cult of incredible proportions". Five hundred Dianetic auditing groups had been set up across the United States.

Dianetics was poorly received by the press and the scientific and medical professions. Scientific American said that Hubbard's book contained "more promises and less evidence per page than any publication since the invention of printing", while The New Republic called it a "bold and immodest mixture of complete nonsense and perfectly reasonable common sense, taken from long acknowledged findings and disguised and distorted by a crazy, newly invented terminology". Some of Hubbard's fellow science fiction writers also criticized it; Isaac Asimov considered it "gibberish" while Jack Williamson called it "a lunatic revision of Freudian psychology".

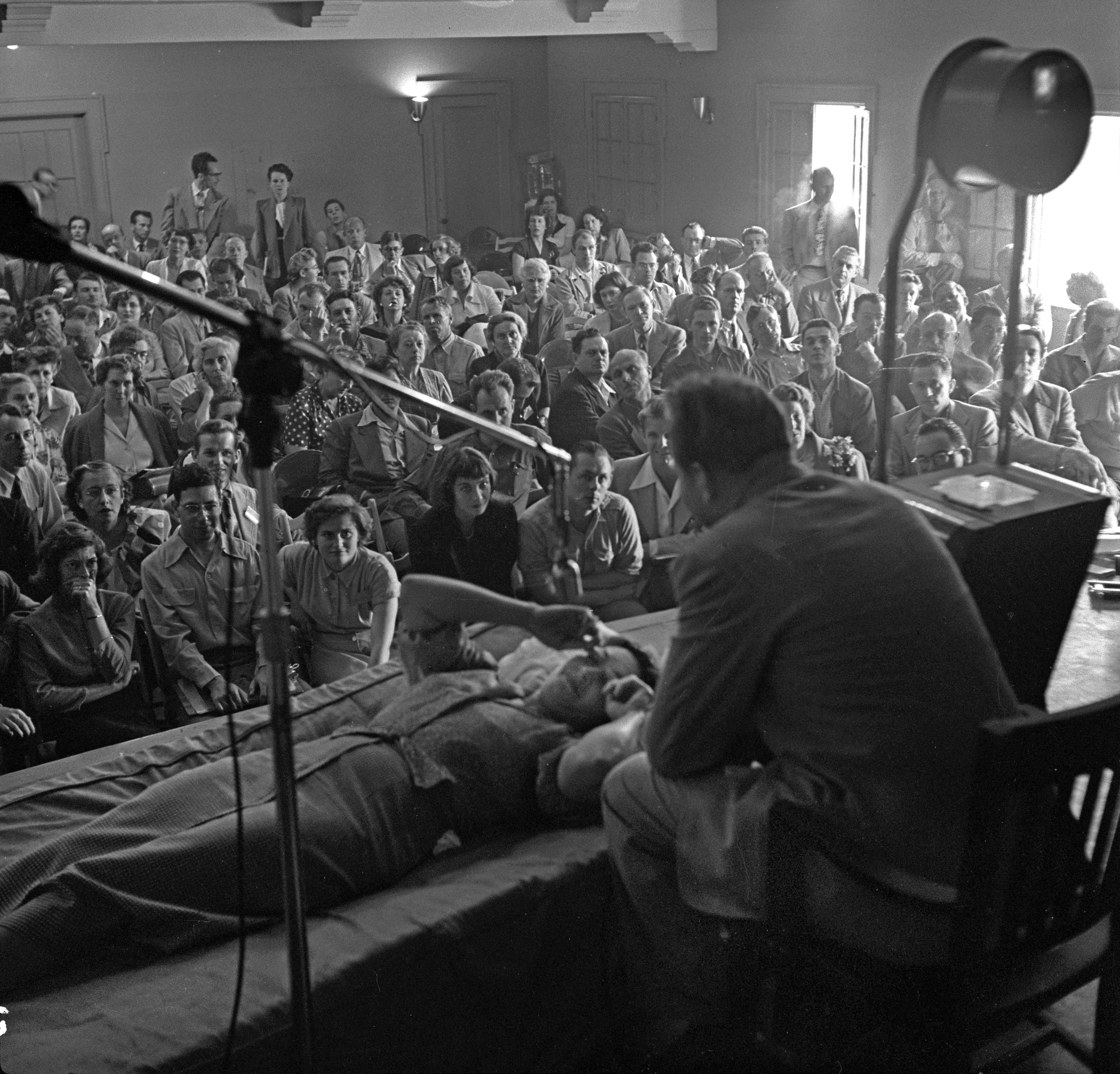
Hubbard conducting a Dianetics seminar in Los Angeles, 1950

In April 1950, a "Hubbard Dianetic Research Foundation" was established in Elizabeth, New Jersey, with Hubbard, Sara, Winter and Campbell on the board of directors. Hubbard abandoned freelance writing in order to promote Dianetics, writing several books about it in the next decade, delivering lectures, and founding Dianetics organizations.

Although Dianetics was not cheap, a great many people were nonetheless willing to pay; van Vogt later recalled "doing little but tear open envelopes and pull out $500 checks from people who wanted to take an auditor's course". Financial controls were lax. Hubbard himself took large sums with no explanation of what he was doing with it. On one occasion, van Vogt saw Hubbard taking a lump sum of $56,000 out of the Los Angeles Foundation's proceeds. One of Hubbard's employees, Helen O'Brien, commented that at the Elizabeth, N.J. branch of the Foundation, the books showed that "a month's income of $90,000 is listed, with only $20,000 accounted for".

Years later, Sara would argue that while Hubbard had initially aimed merely to create religion for profit, the success affected Hubbard: "We were surrounded by sycophants. He began to believe that he was a saviour and hero; that he really was this God figure." Dianetics lost public credibility on August 10, 1950, when a presentation by Hubbard before an audience of 6,000 at the Shrine Auditorium in Los Angeles failed disastrously. He introduced a Clear named Sonya Bianca and told the audience that as a result of undergoing Dianetic therapy she now possessed perfect recall. In fact, she "failed to remember a single formula in physics (the subject in which she was majoring) or the color of Hubbard's tie when his back was turned. At this point, a large part of the audience got up and left." Popular science writer Martin Gardner publicized the outcome of the catastrophic meeting in his writings.

By late 1950, the Elizabeth, N.J. Foundation was in financial crisis and the Los Angeles Foundation was more than $200,000 in debt. Winter and Art Ceppos, the publisher of Hubbard's book, resigned under acrimonious circumstances. Campbell also resigned, criticizing Hubbard for being impossible to work with and blaming him for the disorganization and financial ruin of the Foundations. In December 1950, the American Psychological Association publicly criticized Hubbard's claims as "not supported by empirical evidence". In 1951, Winter publicly wrote that he had never seen a single convincing Clear.

External videos
- Interview with Barbara Klowden, Hubbard's public relationship assistant and lover

In late 1950, Hubbard had begun an affair with his 20-year-old public relations assistant Barbara Klowden, prompting Sara to start a relationship with Dianetics auditor Miles Hollister. On December 20, Hubbard paid a $50 fine for leaving his 8-month-old daughter Alexis locked in a car. On February 9, 1951, the bodies of David Cary and his wife Helen were found after about two weeks. Both had recently been involved in the Dianetics Institute in Los Angeles, David serving as an instructor there. Police concluded Helen shot her husband and then turned the gun on herself.

== Public claims of paranoid schizophrenia amid kidnapping scandal ==
On February 23, 1951, Sara Hubbard contacted Jack Maloney, the national executive officer of the Elizabeth foundation, informing him "that competent medical advisors recommended that [L. Ron] Hubbard be committed to a private sanitarium for psychiatric observation and treatment of a mental ailment known as paranoid schizophrenia". Maloney informed L. Ron Hubbard. That night, L. Ron Hubbard, accompanied by Foundation staffers Frank Dessler and Richard De Mille, kidnapped Hubbard's year-old daughter Alexis and wife Sara and forcibly took them to San Bernardino, California, where he attempted unsuccessfully to find a doctor to examine Sara and declare her insane. He let Sara go but took Alexis to Havana, Cuba.

Hubbard denounced Sara and her lover to the FBI in March 1951, portraying them in a letter as communist infiltrators. The FBI did not take Hubbard seriously: an agent annotated his correspondence with the comment, "Appears mental".

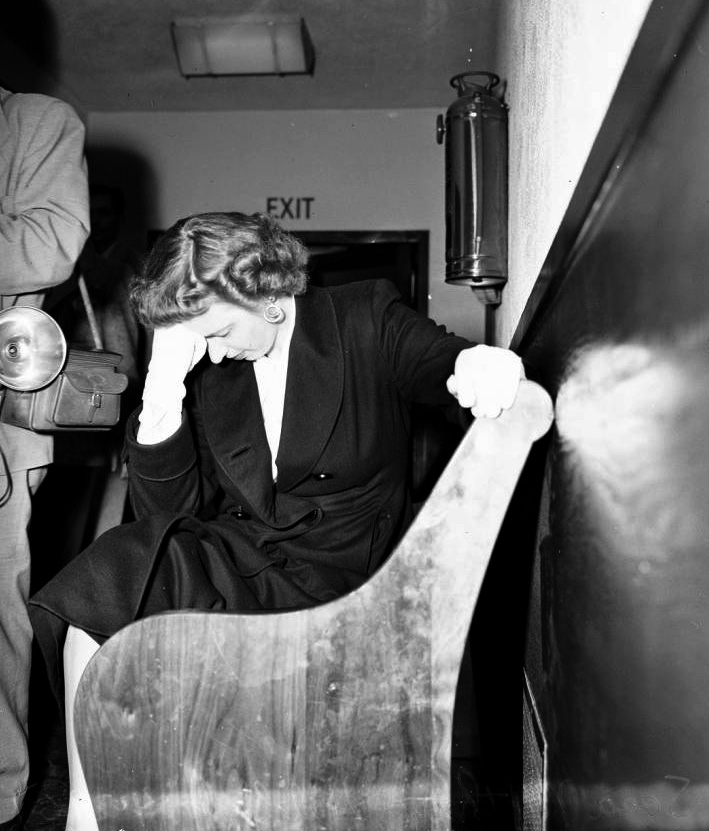
Hubbard's wife, Sara, at a 1951 custody hearing

On April 12, Sara's story was published in the press. On April 15, Hubbard wrote to Sara from Cuba claiming that he was "being transferred to the United States... as a classified scientist immune from interference of all kind" and that "Dianetics will last 10,000 years — for the Army and Navy have it now." Sara filed a divorce suit on April 23 that accused him of marrying her bigamously and subjecting her to sleep deprivation, beatings, strangulation, kidnapping, and exhortations to commit suicide. The case led to newspaper headlines such as "Ron Hubbard Insane, Says His Wife". Hubbard's first wife Polly evidently saw the headlines and wrote to Sara on May 2 offering her help, saying "Ron is not normal... Your charges probably sound fantastic to the average person – but I've been through it – the beatings, threats on my life, all the sadistic traits you charge – twelve years of it."

After her release, Sara filed for divorce, charging Hubbard with causing her "extreme cruelty, great mental anguish and physical suffering". Her allegations produced more lurid headlines: not only was Hubbard accused of bigamy and kidnapping, but she had been subjected to "systematic torture, including loss of sleep, beatings, and strangulations and scientific experiments". Because of his "crazy misconduct" she was in "hourly fear of both the life of herself and of her infant daughter, who she has not seen for two months".

On April 23, 1951, it was publicly reported that Sara had consulted doctors who "concluded that said Hubbard was hopelessly insane, and crazy, and that there was no hope for said Hubbard, or any reason for her to endure further; that competent medical advisers recommended that said Hubbard be committed to a private sanatorium for psychiatric observation and treatment of a mental ailment known as paranoid schizophrenia." The San Francisco Chronicle coverage used the headline "Ron Hubbard Insane, Says His Wife".

Hubbard's lover, Barbara Klowden, recorded in her journal:

He [Hubbard] talked about what he was going to do to psychiatrists.

How he brought psychotic into present time in psychiatrists office and how that psychiatrist said to him "If you think you've cured this woman you're crazy. If you claim to cure people by doing that, if you're not careful, we'll lock you up." He laughed and laughed.

Then, tearing indignantly at chicken leg, he said "They all came to me and said I was a psychotic. Hah. They called me a paranoid. Can you imagine?"

My blood ran cold as he was saying that and it was all I could do to keep from weeping. Wouldn't it tear your heart out coming from the one you love when you knew all the time was a psychotic and a paranoid?

On May 14, Hubbard again wrote to the FBI, this time claiming Sara had tried to kill him by thrusting a needle into his heart, injecting air, and shocking him. In June, Sara finally secured the return of her daughter by agreeing to a settlement with her husband in which she signed a statement, written by him, declaring that she had been misrepresented in the press and that she had always believed he was "fine and brilliant man."

== Pivot to Scientology after losing rights to Dianetics ==
During the Dianetics and Scientology era, Hubbard regularly relocated across the country, living in Elizabeth, New Jersey (1950); Los Angeles (1950-51), Wichita (1951-52), Phoenix (1952-53), Philadelphia (December 1952), Camden, New Jersey (1953-55); and D.C. (1955-59). In 1959, after losing tax-exemption in the US, Hubbard relocated to England.

Popular science writer Martin Gardner observed "The dianetics craze seems to have burned itself out as quickly as it caught fire, and Hubbard himself has become embroiled in a welter of personal troubles". Dianetics appeared to be on the edge of total collapse. However, it was temporarily saved by Don Purcell, a millionaire who agreed to support a new Foundation in Wichita, Kansas.

In August 1951, Hubbard published Science of Survival. In that book, Hubbard introduced concepts as the immortal soul (or "Thetan") and past-life regressions (or "Whole Track Auditing"). The Wichita Foundation underwrote the costs of printing the book, but it recorded poor sales when first published, with only 1,250 copies of the first edition being printed.

The Wichita Foundation became financially nonviable after a court ruled that it was liable for the unpaid debts of its defunct predecessor in Elizabeth, N.J. The ruling prompted Purcell and the other directors of the Wichita Foundation to file for voluntary bankruptcy in February 1952. Hubbard resigned immediately and accused Purcell of having been bribed by the American Medical Association to destroy Dianetics. Hubbard emptied the Wichita foundation's bank accounts, in part through forgery.

Hubbard established a "Hubbard College" on the other side of town in Wichita where he continued to promote Dianetics while fighting Purcell in the courts over the Foundation's intellectual property. Non-Scientologist writers have suggested that Hubbard aimed "to reassert control over his creation", that he believed "he was about to lose control of Dianetics", or that he wanted to ensure "he would be able to stay in business even if the courts eventually awarded control of Dianetics and its valuable copyrights to ... the hated Don Purcell." Scientology was a very small-scale movement at first. Hubbard started off with only a few dozen followers, generally dedicated Dianeticists.

In March 1952, Hubbard married Mary-Sue Whipp, seen here five years later.

At a convention of about 80 followers assembled in a Wichita hotel banquet hall, Hubbard introduced a device called an "electropsychometer" (or e-meter) which had been constructed by inventor Volney Mathison. The device, which called for users to hold two soup-cans in their hands, measures changes in skin conductivity due to variance in sweat or grip. Roughly similar devices had been in experimental use by psychologists for decades. Rather than a mundane biofeedback device, Hubbard presented the e-meter as having "an almost mystical power to reveal an individual's innermost thoughts".

Hubbard announced that he had discovered a new science beyond Dianetics which he called "Scientology". Whereas the goal of Dianetics had been to reach a superhuman state of "Clear", Scientology promised a chance to achieve god-like powers in a state called Operating Thetan.

Only six weeks after setting up the Hubbard College and marrying a staff member, 18-year-old Mary Sue Whipp, Hubbard closed it down and moved with his new bride to Phoenix, Arizona. In April 1952, Hubbard arrived in Phoenix, and began operating out of a small office he dubbed the headquarters of the "Hubbard Association of Scientologists". That summer, Hubbard was joined in Phoenix by his 18-year-old son Nibs, who moved into his father's home and went on to become a Scientology staff member and "professor". Nibs would later claim the Phoenix organization had been taken over by blackmailing the original owner.

In July, Hubbard published "What to Audit" (later re-titled Scientology: A History of Man), which teaches that individuals have subconscious memories of past lives as clams, sloths, and cavemen, and that those memories result in neuroses. Nibs later reported that he helped create the book while under the influence of the amphetamine Benzedrine.

On September 10, 1952, Hubbard incorporated the Hubbard Association of Scientologists — he could not use the term Dianetics in the name as he no longer owned it. Scientology was organized in a very different way from the decentralized Dianetics movement — The Hubbard Association of Scientologists (HAS) was the only official Scientology organization. Branches or "orgs" were organized as franchises, rather like a fast food restaurant chain. Each franchise holder was required to pay ten percent of income to Hubbard's central organization. They were expected to find new recruits, known as "raw meat", but were restricted to providing only basic services. Costlier higher-level auditing was only provided by Hubbard's central organization. On September 24, 1952, while in London, Hubbard's wife Mary Sue gave birth to her first child, a daughter whom they named Diana Meredith de Wolfe Hubbard.

== Occult lectures and "the religion angle" ==
"I’m going to send him back a letter. Uh... so... uh... you say you have some connection with the Prince of Darkness out there and you’re very worried about this.
Who do you think I am?"

— L. Ron Hubbard (December 1952)

In November 1952, Hubbard published Scientology 8-80, followed up in December with Scientology 8-8008. Hubbard summarized his thinking in the later, writing: "It is now considered that the origin of MEST lies with theta itself, and that MEST, as we know the physical universe, is a product of theta." Quoting that line, Malko writes, "Put another way, colloquially, all matter, energy, space, and time are, well, a figment of our imagination. It is all here because we are thinking it."

In December, Hubbard gave a seventy-hour series of lectures in Philadelphia that was attended by 38 people. In the lectures, Hubbard connects Crowleyite magical rituals and the practice of Scientology. Hubbard explains the use of Tarot, and discusses "the magic cults" of the 8th–12th centuries. Hubbard discusses astral projection which he terms "going exterior". He recommends The Master Therion as "the only modern work that has anything to do with them". He describes the book's author, Aleister Crowley, as "my very good friend," though there is some question about his intent in this remark because Hubbard never met Crowley personally. Hubbard also explains that Crowley signs himself "The Beast"; "The Mark of the Beast, 666." Hubbard's eldest son Nibs, wrote that "In preparation for the next day's lecture, [Hubbard]'d pace the floor, exhilarated by this or that passage from Aleister Crowley's writings." In 1983, Nibs recalled: "[My father] thought of himself as the Beast 666 incarnate... The Antichrist. Aleister Crowley thought of himself as such. And when Crowley died in 1947, my father then decided he should wear the cloak of the beast and become the most powerful being in the universe... you've got to realize that my father did not worship Satan. He thought he was Satan."

During the Philadelphia course, Hubbard jokes that he is "the prince of darkness", which is met with laughter from the audience. On December 16, 1952, Hubbard was arrested in the middle of a lecture for failing to return $9,000 withdrawn from the Wichita Foundation. He eventually settled the debt by paying $1,000 and returning a car that he had borrowed from Wichita financier Don Purcell.

In April 1953, Hubbard authored a letter outlining plans for transforming Scientology into a religion. In that letter, Hubbard proposed setting up a chain of "Spiritual Guidance Centers" as part of what he called "the religion angle". The letter's recipient, Helen O'Brien, resigned the following September. Nibs Hubbard later recalled using violence to intimidate O'Brien and take control of her organization. Years later, O'Brien criticized Hubbard for creating "a temperate zone voodoo, in its inelasticity, unexplainable procedures, and mindless group euphoria".

Despite objections, on December 18, 1953, Hubbard incorporated the Church of Scientology, in Camden, New Jersey. Hubbard, his wife Mary Sue and his secretary John Galusha became the trustees of all three corporations. The reason for the religious transformation was explained as a way to protect Scientologists from charges of practicing medicine without a license.

The idea may not have been new; Hubbard has been quoted as telling a science fiction convention in 1948: "Writing for a penny a word is ridiculous. If a man really wants to make a million dollars, the best way would be to start his own religion." Harlan Ellison has told a story of seeing Hubbard at a gathering of the Hydra Club in 1953 or 1954. Hubbard was complaining of not being able to make a living on what he was being paid as a science fiction writer. Ellison says that Lester del Rey told Hubbard that what he needed to do to get rich was start a religion.

== Sources ==
- Atack, Jon (1990). A Piece of Blue Sky: Scientology, Dianetics and L. Ron Hubbard Exposed. Lyle Stuart Books. ISBN 081840499X. OL 9429654M.
- Gardner, Martin (1986). Fads and Fallacies in the Name of Science. Dover Publications. ISBN 978-0-486-20394-2. OCLC 18598918. OL 22475247M.
- Miller, Russell (1987). Bare-faced Messiah : The True Story of L. Ron Hubbard. Henry Holt and Company. ISBN 0805006540. OCLC 17481843. OL 26305813M.
- O'Brien, Helen (1966). Dianetics in Limbo: A Documentary About Immortality. Whitmore Publishing. OCLC 4797460.
- Streeter, Michael (2008). Behind closed doors: the power and influence of secret societies. New Holland Publishers. ISBN 9781845379377. OCLC 231589690. OL 25446794M.
- Streissguth, Thomas (1995). Charismatic cult leaders. The Oliver Press. ISBN 978-1-881508-18-2. OCLC 30892074.
- Tucker, Ruth A. (1989). Another Gospel: Cults, Alternative Religions, and the New Age Movement. Zondervan. ISBN 0310259371. OL 9824980M.
- Urban, Hugh B. (2012). "The Occult Roots of Scientology? L. Ron Hubbard, Aleister Crowley, and the Origins of a Controversial New Religion". In Bogdan, Henrik; Starr, Martin P. (eds.). Aleister Crowley and Western Esotericism. Oxford and New York: Oxford University Press. pp. 335–68. ISBN 978-0-19-986309-9. OCLC 820009842.
- Whitehead, Harriet (1987). Renunciation and reformulation: a study of conversion in an American sect. Cornell University Press. ISBN 978-0-8014-1849-5. OCLC 14002616. OL 2722663M.
- Winter, Joseph A (1951). A Doctor's Report on Dianetics: Theory and Therapy. Julian Press. ISBN 0517564211. OCLC 1572759.
