= History of Dianetics and Scientology =

History of Dianetics and Scientology begins around 1950. During the late 1940s, L. Ron Hubbard began developing a mental therapy system which he called Dianetics. Hubbard had tried to interest the medical profession in his techniques, including the Gerontological Society, the Journal of the American Medical Association, and the American Journal of Psychiatry, but his work was rejected for not containing sufficient evidence of efficacy to be acceptable.

In April 1950, he published his ideas in Astounding Science Fiction where he was well-known as a science fiction writer. The article generated a lot of interest and the following month Hubbard published the book Dianetics: The Modern Science of Mental Health. The book brought in money and Hubbard began teaching courses through the Hubbard Dianetic Research Foundation.

The scientific and medical communities were critical of Dianetics — the American Psychological Association called on psychologists to not use the techniques and complaints were made against local Dianetics practitioners for allegedly practicing medicine without a license. Financial problems ensued, but despite the influx of financial support from some wealthy followers, the first foundations resulted in bankruptcy and the loss of the name and copyrights to Dianetics.

Around 1952, Hubbard went on to create Scientology, eventually regaining the rights to Dianetics which he incorporated into Scientology. Today, Dianetics is a part of Scientology and is used as a beginning promotion to new people.

== Origins ==
The Church of Scientology claims that during a near-death experience it was revealed to L. Ron Hubbard that "the primary law of all existence is Survive!", after which he wrote a manuscript in 1938 called Excalibur—which he was never able to get published—but which formed the foundation for Dianetics and Scientology.

During Hubbard's service in the United States Navy, in 1945 he was admitted to the Oak Knoll Naval Hospital in Oakland, California. While there, he claimed to have carried out research into endocrinology "to determine whether or not structure monitors function or function monitors structure ... using nothing but Freudian Psychoanalysis and using a park bench as a consulting room", spending a great deal of time in the hospital's library, where he would have encountered the work of Sigmund Freud and other psychoanalysts.

== The emergence of Dianetics ==
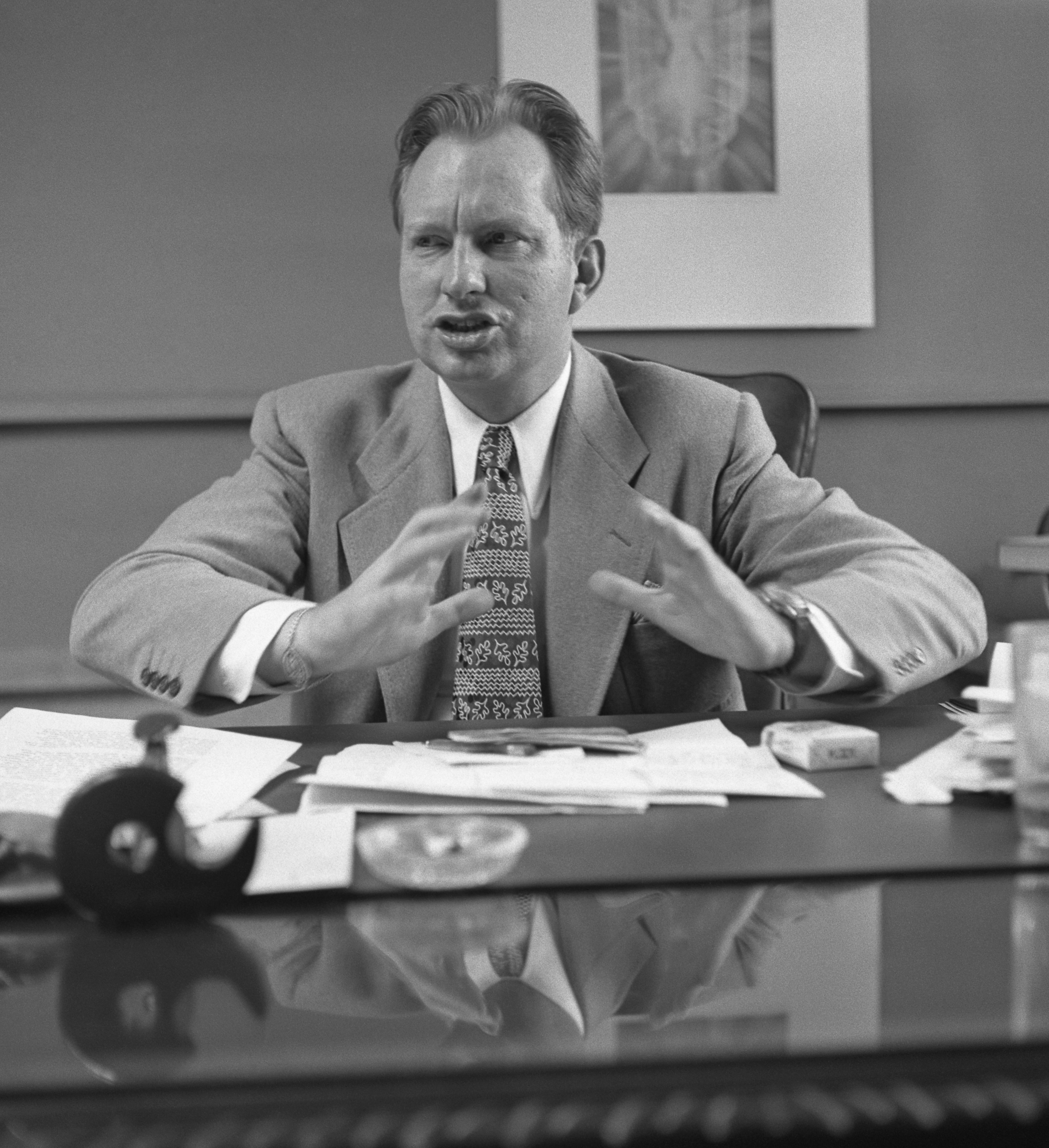
L. Ron Hubbard in 1950

In January 1949, Hubbard informed his literary agent, Forrest J. Ackerman, that he was writing a book on the "cause and cure of nervous tension", which he was going to call either The Dark Sword or Excalibur or Science of the Mind, and assured Ackerman that the book had "more selling and publicity angles than any book of which I have ever heard". In the same month, he told Writers' Markets and Methods magazine that he was working on a "book of psychology".

In April 1949, Hubbard told the Gerontological Society at Baltimore City Hospital that he was preparing a paper with the somewhat unwieldy title of Certain Discoveries and Researches Leading to the Removal of Early Traumatic Experiences Including Attempted Abortion, Birth Shock and Infant Illnesses and Accidents with an Examination of their Effects Physiological and Psychological and their Potential Influence on Longevity on the Adult Individual with an Account of the Techniques Evolved and Employed. Hubbard's letter was "politely received", but the Society apparently declined involvement. He also wrote to the American Medical Association and the American Psychiatric Association. These letters, and their responses, have not been published, though Hubbard later said that they had been negative.

In 1949, Hubbard told his friend John W. Campbell, the editor of Astounding Science Fiction magazine and publisher of many of Hubbard's short stories, about his work. Campbell had been one of Hubbard's early test subjects and believed that Hubbard's techniques had cured his persistent sinusitis, so he was an enthusiastic supporter. In a letter to one of Astounding's contributors, Jack Williamson, he wrote: "I know dianetics is one of, if not the greatest, discovery of all Man's written and unwritten history. It produces the sort of stability and sanity men have dreamed about for centuries."

In July 1949, Campbell wrote to another contributor, Joseph A. Winter, a physician from Michigan. Winter was intrigued by Campbell's claims about Hubbard's work, but initially skeptical; Hubbard sent him what he called "an operator's manual for your use" which convinced Winter that Dianetics had some promise. Winter later wrote:

With cooperation from some institutions, some psychiatrists, he [Hubbard] has worked on all types of cases. Institutionalized schizophrenics, apathies, manics, depressives, perverts, stuttering, neuroses - in all, nearly 1000 cases. But just a brief sampling of each type; he doesn't have proper statistics in the usual sense. But he has one statistic. He has cured every patient he worked with. He has cured ulcers, arthritis, asthma.

In October 1949, Winter, Hubbard, and Campbell met at Hubbard's home in Bay Head, New Jersey, to continue work. Winter attempted to interest some medical colleagues and psychiatrists in Dianetics, with little success, and suggested to Hubbard that he publish an article to stimulate interest in his work. Perhaps mindful of the rejection of his earlier efforts, Hubbard told Winter that "the articles you suggest would be more acceptable coming from another pen than mine." Accordingly, in late 1949, Winter wrote a paper "giving a brief resumé of the principles and methodology of dianetic therapy" which he submitted informally to an editor of the Journal of the American Medical Association. However, the editor told Winter that "the paper as written did not contain sufficient evidence of efficacy to be acceptable and was, moreover, better suited to one of the journals which dealt with psychotherapy." He revised the paper, added case histories provided by Hubbard, and submitted it to the American Journal of Psychiatry, which rejected it on the same grounds.

According to the Church of Scientology, Hubbard issued his early research in the form of a manuscript entitled Dianetics: The Original Thesis in 1948; Hubbard gives the year as 1949. It received a wider public release in 1951 and is now published as the book The Dynamics of Life. The original text is not available for comparison with the 1951 publication, but it may have comprised the "operator's manual" written by Hubbard for Winter, which is the first independently attested codification of Dianetics.

== Dianetics in print ==
At the end of 1949, Hubbard and Campbell agreed to announce Dianetics in the upcoming May issue of Astounding, to be followed by a full-length book. Campbell arranged for Hermitage House, a small New York City medical and psychiatric textbook publisher, to publish the book. Hubbard also published an article in The Explorers Journal called "Terra Incognita: The Mind". Dianetics was not quite finished at this stage; engrams were called comanomes, a neologism proposed by Winter that was later abandoned.

In April 1950, Hubbard, Campbell, Winter and several others established a Hubbard Dianetic Research Foundation in Elizabeth, New Jersey to coordinate work related to the forthcoming publication. Hubbard wrote Dianetics: The Modern Science of Mental Health at that time, allegedly completing the 180,000-word book in six weeks.

Hubbard first published his ideology of mental health techniques in the third week of April 1950 in Astounding, followed by publishing as a book in May 1950. It quickly sold out its first run of 8,000 copies. Only two months after the book's publication, Newsweek reported that over 55,000 copies had been sold and enthusiasts had established 500 Dianetics clubs across the United States. In July, Time magazine reported that it was climbing the U.S. bestseller lists. Campbell reported in the August 1950 Astounding that the magazine was receiving up to a thousand letters a week about Dianetics. Sales reached 150,000 copies by the end of the year.

Campbell's endorsement had proven invaluable; Astounding Science Fiction had over 150,000 readers, many of whom were familiar with Hubbard's science fiction and had a strong interest in new scientific discoveries. Among the wider population, Dianetics gained popularity as a cheaper, simpler and apparently more effective means of self-improvement than conventional psychotherapies. Hubbard's optimistic view that Dianetics could alleviate the Cold War climate of tension and fear also struck a chord. One of his supporters, Frederick L. Schuman, wrote in a letter to The New York Times that "History has become a race between Dianetics and catastrophe".

The success of Dianetics brought in a flood of money. Hubbard offered teaching courses for Dianetic "auditors" through the Hubbard Dianetic Research Foundation, costing $500 per person for four to six weeks of instruction and thirty-six hours of Dianetic therapy. Hubbard recruited his friend and fellow science fiction writer A. E. van Vogt to act as the Foundation's treasurer, and five other Foundations were soon established in Washington, DC, New York City, Chicago, Los Angeles and Honolulu. The Foundation's Los Angeles property alone was valued at $4.5 million.

== Opposition to Dianetics ==
The scientific and medical communities were far less enthusiastic about Dianetics, viewing it with bemusement, concern, or outright derision. Nobel Prize–winning physicist I.I. Rabi, reviewing Dianetics for Scientific American, declared that "this volume probably contains more promises and less evidence per page than has any publication since the invention of printing." He noted that the publication of Dianetics had coincided with that of Worlds in Collision, a notorious work of pseudoscience by Immanuel Velikovsky, with which Dianetics shared the top of the best-seller lists. This, Rabi said, illustrated "the most frightening proof of the confusion of the contemporary mind and its tendency to fall prey to pseudo-scientific concepts."

The Nation pointed out the lack of documentation in Dianetics: "No case histories are offered to substantiate his claims, nor is there documentation of any kind to indicate that any previous thinker, medical or otherwise, ever made a significant contribution to the subject of human behavior." The Individual Psychology Bulletin also criticized Hubbard for "not offer[ing] any other evidence than a vague reference to hundreds of cured patients, without furnishing case histories or other specific data. The book is crammed with bragging and swaggering, pseudoscientific bombast, platitudes and vulgarities, and a great deal of sheer nonsense." British health minister Kenneth Robinson, among others, expressed concern at the possible dangers of unskilled amateurs practicing therapy on patients, and skepticism about Hubbard's claims that Dianetics could be effective in dealing with illnesses.

In September 1950, the American Psychological Association issued a resolution calling on psychologists not to use Hubbard's methods for treatment purposes unless and until they had been shown effective through scientific testing. Complaints were made against local Dianetics practitioners for allegedly practicing medicine without a license. This eventually prompted Dianetics advocates to disclaim any medicinal benefits in order to avoid regulation.

Hubbard explained the backlash as a response from various entities trying to co-opt Dianetics for their own use. He claimed that "just about the time [Dianetics] hit the stands" (i.e. April–May 1950), a "very high-ranking officer" of the US Navy had approached him to sound him out about "using what you know about the mind to make people more suggestible." Hubbard apparently avoided this by resigning from the Navy. He also told the FBI in a 1952 interview that "the Soviets apparently realized the value of Dianetics because as early as 1938 an official of Amtorg [the Soviet trade organization], while at The Explorers Club in New York, contacted him to suggest that he go to Russia and develop Dianetics there." The FBI agent conducting the interview was not convinced, describing Hubbard as "a mental case".

Hubbard blamed the hostile press coverage in particular on a plot by the American Communist Party, working through the Authors League of America. According to Hubbard,

These people in the early days of Dianetics said, "We can use Dianetics." They were all my friends. Everywhere I looked, every writer I knew who had ever been a member of the Communist Party was right there alongside of me pumping my hand, saying, "Good going, Ron. We knew you had it in you." ... And when they finally got it through their thick skulls in October 1950 that I didn't care to have Dianetics and Scientology covertly used by any other organization on Earth for their own special purposes, Dianetics and Scientology in the public presses had it.

In later years, Hubbard decided that the psychiatric profession was the origin of all of the criticism of Dianetics, as he believed it secretly controlled most of the world's governments. Current church head David Miscavige has also propagated this theory:

At stake were all of [psychiatrists'] vested interest dollars. How could they get research grants? Millions, or even billions - if the problems of the mind were already solved? And how could they hide the fact of LRH's discoveries if the whole country was talking about them? Their initial attacks have been mentioned over the years by us. First they got "technical reviews" by psychiatrists hatcheting Dianetics. They published these critical reviews in their psychiatric trade magazines ... Then they took these published reviews and handed them out to the press where they were promptly requoted as authority in magazines like "Slime" and "Tripe" [i.e. Time and Life].

== Fragmentation and transformation ==
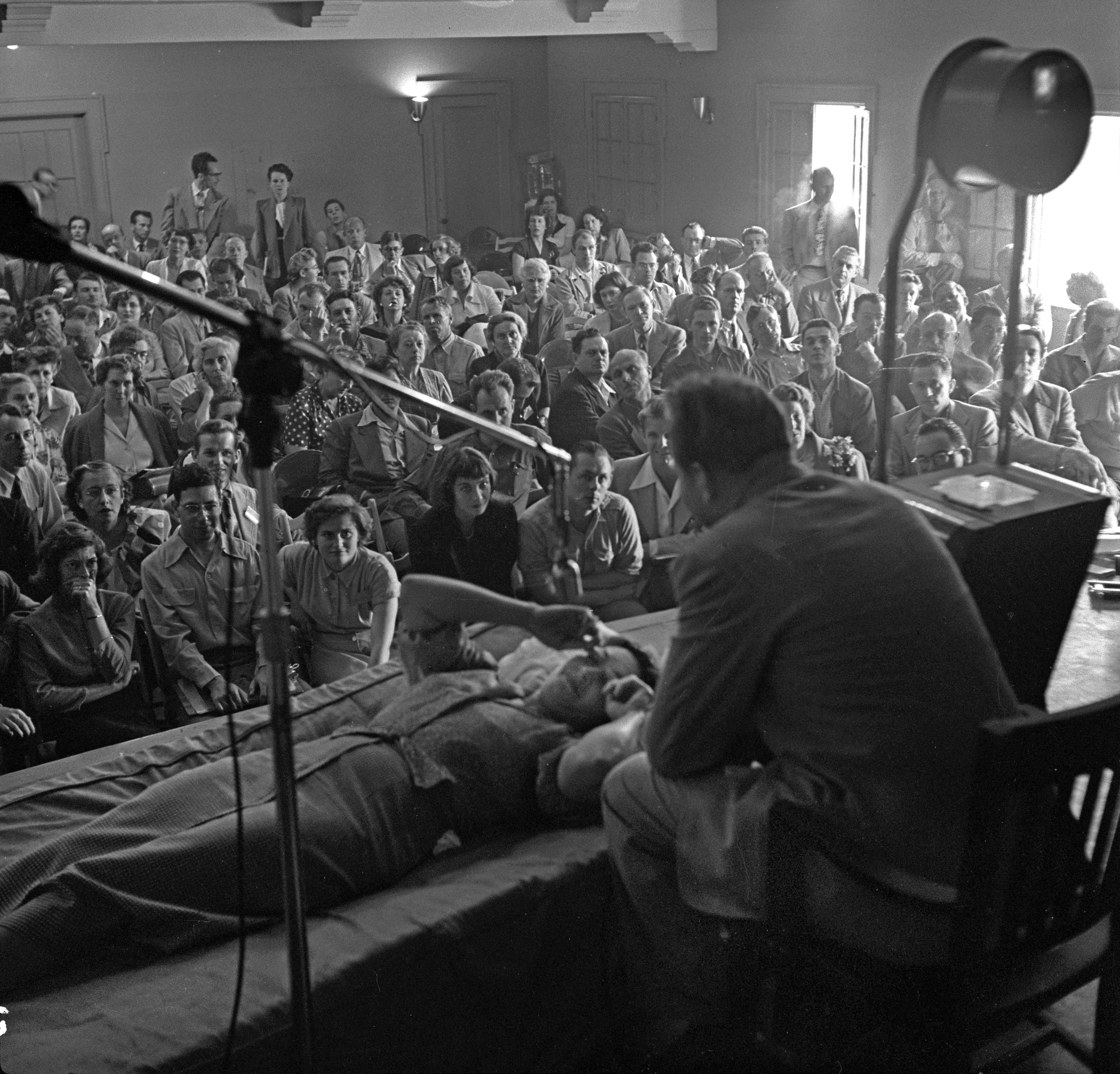
L. Ron Hubbard conducting Dianetics seminar

By the autumn of 1950, financial problems had developed. Book sales, lectures and auditor training still generated revenue, but financial controls were lax; Hubbard described the situation as "something on the accounting system of dumping it all in a barrel outside the door and hauling the barrel down to a bank every once in a while". Hubbard's treasurer, A. E. van Vogt, said that Hubbard personally withdrew large sums from Foundation accounts, apparently without any prior notice or explanation of his purpose; van Vogt calculated that, by November 1950 the six Foundations had spent around one million dollars and were more than $200,000 in debt.

Matters were not improved by Hubbard's experiments with a cocktail of benzedrine, vitamins and glutamic acid, called GUK after the rifle cleaning fluid used by the US Marine Corps, which he believed would provide a chemical alternative to auditing. The Foundation purchased a 110-room building in Los Angeles for the project, but Winter writes that it proved a "dismal, expensive failure".

Disagreements emerged over the direction of the Dianetic Foundation's work, and relations between the board members became strained, with several leaving, even to support causes critical of Dianetics. One example was Harvey Jackins, founder of Re-evaluation counseling, originally a sort of discrete reworking of Dianetics, which L Ron Hubbard later declared suppressive to Scientology. Hubbard's interest in past lives was a particular cause of tension, as he noted in his 1951 book Science of Survival:

The subject of past deaths and past lives is so full of tension that as early as last July (1950-Ed) the board of trustees of the Foundation sought to pass a resolution banning the entire subject. And I have been many times requested to omit any reference to these in the present work or in public for fear that a general impression would get out that Dianetics had something to do with spiritualism.

Winter recorded his dissatisfaction with the state of affairs, believing that "Foundation dianetics was becoming crystallized, ritualistic and sterile", characterized by a "none-too-subtle antagonism towards the medical profession in general and the psychiatric field in particular". He commented that "any attempts to force the medical profession to accept it solely on the basis of the affirmation, 'It works!' and deriding those who request more conclusive proof, is more than likely to jeopardize whatever possible benefits there might be." Having failed to steer the Foundation onto "a more reasoned and conservative basis", he resigned in October 1950. Art Ceppos, the publisher of Dianetics, also resigned at this time, cutting off the Foundation's supply of books; he went on to publish Winter's critical book on Dianetics, A Doctor's Report on Dianetics: Theory and Therapy.

John W. Campbell became dissatisfied as well, accusing Hubbard of "dogmatism and authoritarianism" after the latter insisted that only the Hubbard-approved "Standard Procedure" of Dianetics be used and condemned all other methods as dangerous "Black Dianetics". This was a departure from Hubbard's previously liberal outlook, when he had rejected any attempt to monopolise Dianetics. Campbell resigned from the board in March 1951; although he remained interested in Dianetics for several years afterwards, he eventually moved on to other causes.

The most serious breach occurred with Hubbard's wife Sara, the Foundation's librarian and formerly his personal auditor and research subject. According to Barbara Klowdan, his public relations assistant, both had had affairs—Sara with Miles Hollister, a Dianetics instructor in Los Angeles, and Hubbard with Klowdan herself. Sara was suspended from the Foundation's board of directors and her official post. She filed divorce papers in March 1951, and her claims of "systematic torture" allegedly suffered at Hubbard's hands attracted widespread media attention. A few weeks later, Hubbard told the FBI that Sara had tried to kill him: "I was knocked out, had a needle thrust into my heart to give it a jet of air to produce "coronary thrombosis" and was given an electric shock with a 110 volt current". Hubbard later characterized the suit as "a gal I wasn't even married to was suing me for divorce."

Hubbard appears to have believed that his organization was under sustained attack from Communist interests. From March 2, 1951, all employees of the Dianetic Foundations were "requested to sign a strong oath of loyalty to the U.S. government, a denial of Communism and that their fingerprints be taken and forwarded to the F.B.I." Those who had left the organization, he claimed, were Communist agents; he called Winter a "psycho-neurotic discharged officer of the US Army Medical Corps... Winter seemed to have Communist connections." In one letter to the FBI, he claimed that Ceppos was "connected with Communists" and had tried to obtain the Foundation's mailing list of sixteen thousand names for purposes of distributing Communist literature. In another, he denounced Sara Hubbard and Miles Hollister as "Communist Party members or suspects", describing Hollister as having a "broad forehead, rather Slavic". He complained that "the Communist Party or members of the Communist Party have in the past year wiped out a half a million operation for me, have cost me my health and have considerably retarded material of interest to the United States Government."

In January 1951, the New Jersey Board of Medical Examiners instituted proceedings against the Hubbard Dianetic Research Foundation in Elizabeth for teaching medicine without a licence. The Foundation closed its doors, causing the proceedings to be vacated, but its creditors began to demand settlement of its outstanding debts. Don Purcell, a millionaire Dianeticist from Wichita, Kansas, offered a brief respite from bankruptcy, but the Foundation's finances failed again in 1952. Because of a sale of assets resulting from the bankruptcy, Hubbard no longer owned the rights to the name "Dianetics", but its philosophical framework still provided the seed for Scientology to grow.

== Dianetics in Kansas ==
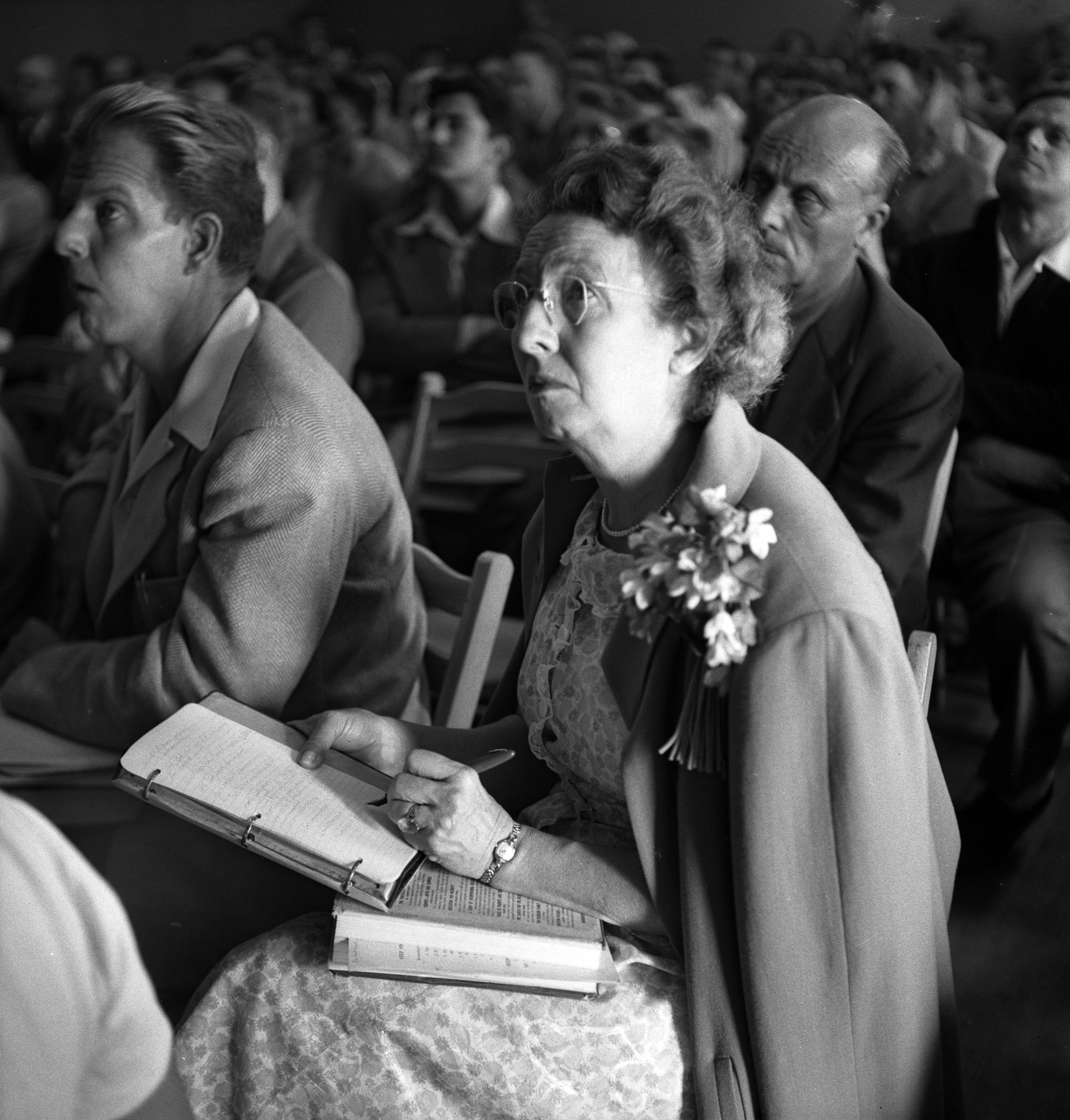
Audience at a Dianetics lecture

Purcell bankrolled a new Hubbard Dianetic Research Foundation in Wichita and paid to print a new edition of Dianetics, along with several new books—Self Analysis, Science of Survival, Notes on the Lectures, Advanced Procedure and Axioms, Child Dianetics, and a range of other Dianetics pamphlets and publications.

The new Foundation soon found itself pursued by creditors, however, as the other Foundations collapsed under the weight of unpaid debts. The income of the Wichita Foundation was far more modest than the earlier Foundations had enjoyed, as public interest in Dianetics had waned. Only 112 people attended the first major conference held at Wichita, and only 51 students attended a subsequent lecture series in October 1951. Science writer Martin Gardner observed that "the dianetics craze seems to have burned itself out as quickly as it caught fire".

In 1952, creditors forced the Wichita Foundation into bankruptcy. Hubbard sold his holdings to Purcell for a nominal sum and established a "Hubbard College" on the other side of Wichita, leaving Purcell to sort out the bankruptcy proceedings. The remaining assets of the Foundation, comprising the copyright of all the tapes, books, techniques, processes and paraphernalia of Dianetics, including the name, went to the auction block; Purcell bought them outright, but Hubbard's financial straits were not improved. One of his staff, James Elliot, sent out an appeal on his behalf: "Somehow Mr. Hubbard must get funds to keep Dianetics from being closed down everywhere. ... He is penniless", and wrote of Hubbard's wish to establish a "free school in Phoenix for the rehabilitation of auditors". This school was launched around April 1952 as the Hubbard Association of Scientologists; he could not use the name "Dianetics", as he no longer owned it.

In May 1952, Purcell's Foundation sent its members a set of accounts showing that it had earned $141,821 but was overspent by $63,222. Hubbard responded angrily, alleging that the American Medical Association had paid Purcell $500,000 to wreck Dianetics. He later claimed that the Communist Party had paid Purcell "to do in a Central Organization". On December 16, 1952, Hubbard was arrested in the middle of a lecture for failing to return $9,000 withdrawn from the Wichita Foundation. He eventually settled the debt by paying $1,000 and returning a car that he had borrowed from Purcell. Purcell finally tired of pursuing Hubbard over the bankruptcy and handed back the Dianetics copyrights in 1954.

== History of Scientology ==
Dianetics provided the seed from which the philosophical framework of Scientology grew. Scientologists refer to the book Dianetics: The Modern Science of Mental Health as "Book One". Hubbard referred to his own calendar based on the publication date of Dianetics; a date of "A.D. 13" signifies "Year 13 After Dianetics", or 1963.

In 1952, Hubbard published a new set of teachings as "Scientology, a religious philosophy". Scientology did not replace Dianetics but extended it to cover new areas, augmenting the Dianetic axioms with new, additional, Scientology axioms. Where the goal of Dianetics is to rid the individual of his reactive mind engrams, the stated goal of Scientology is to rehabilitate the individual's spiritual nature so that he may reach his full potential.

In 1975, Dianetics Today was published, an all-inclusive volume of over 1000 pages. The book introduced the use of the E-Meter, the Original Assessment or standardized interview and a rote routine (referred to as "R3R") for the application of Dianetics. This was known as Standard Dianetics.

In 1978, Hubbard released New Era Dianetics (NED), an e-meter auditing version, and the official step on The Bridge to Total Freedom to attain the level of Clear.

=== Dianetics and the origins of Scientology: 1950–1954 ===
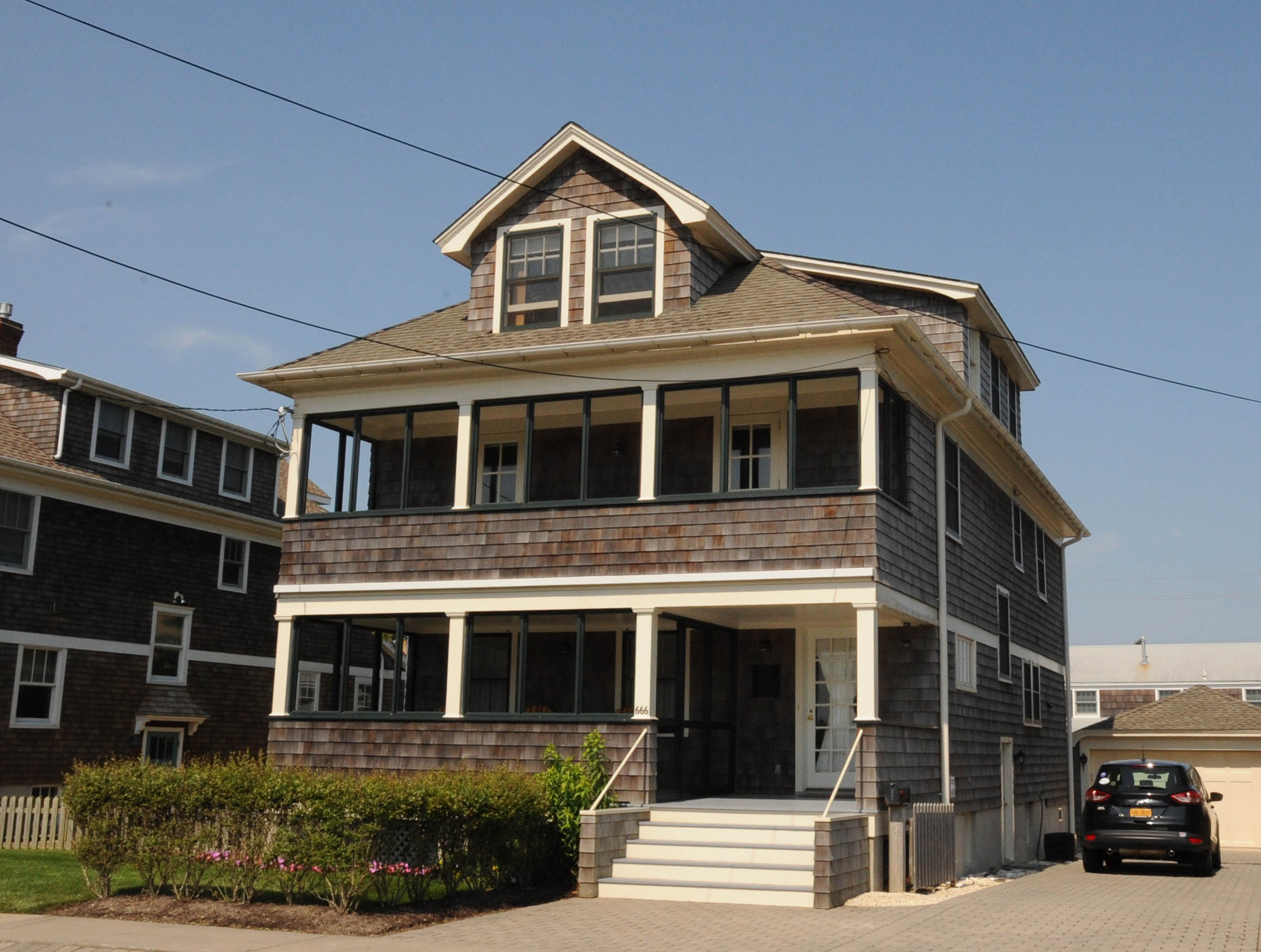
The house at Bay Head in Ocean County, New Jersey where Hubbard finished writing Dianetics in late 1949. The Church of Scientology later declared it an L. Ron Hubbard Landmark Site.

During the late 1940s, Hubbard began developing a therapy system, first producing an unpublished manuscript on the subject in 1948. He subsequently published his ideas as the article "Dianetics: The Evolution of a Science" in Astounding Science Fiction in May 1950. The magazine's editor, John W. Campbell, was a proponent.

Later that year, Hubbard published his ideas as the book, Dianetics: The Modern Science of Mental Health. Published by Hermitage House, the first edition contained an introduction from medical doctor Joseph A. Winter and an appendix by the philosopher Will Durant. Dianetics subsequently spent 28 weeks as a New York Times bestseller. (Note: June 18 to December 24, 1950) Urban suggested that Dianetics was "arguably the first major book of do-it-yourself psychotherapy".

Dianetics describes a "counseling" technique known as "auditing" in which an auditor assists a subject in conscious recall of traumatic events in the individual's past. It was originally intended to be a new psychotherapy. The stated intent is to free individuals of the influence of past traumas by systematic exposure and removal of the engrams (painful memories) these events have left behind, a process called clearing.

In April 1950 Hubbard founded the Hubbard Dianetic Research Foundation (HDRF) in Elizabeth, New Jersey. He began offering courses teaching people how to become auditors and lectured on the topic around the country. Hubbard's ideas generated a new Dianetics movement, which grew swiftly, partly because it was more accessible than psychotherapy and promised more immediate progress. Individuals and small groups practicing Dianetics appeared in various places across the U.S. and United Kingdom.

Hubbard continually sought to refine his Dianetics techniques. In 1951, he introduced E-Meters into the auditing process. The original "Book One Auditing", which Hubbard promoted in the late 1940s and early 1950s, did not use an E-Meter, but simply entailed a question and answer session between the auditor and client.

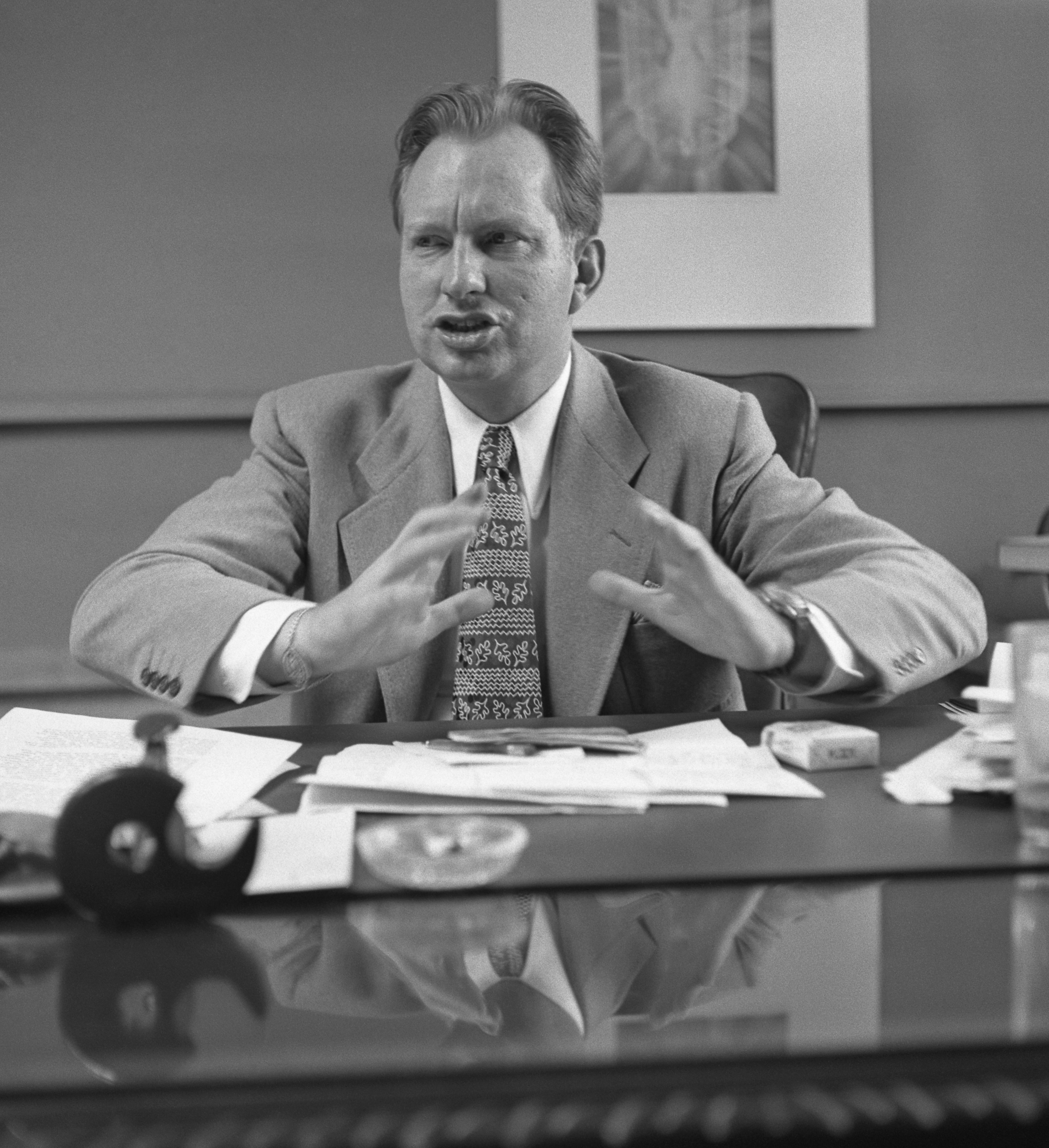
L. Ron Hubbard in 1950

Hubbard labelled Dianetics a "science", rather than considering it a religion. At that time his expressed views of religion were largely negative. He approached both the American Psychiatric Association and the American Medical Association, but neither took Dianetics seriously. Dr. Winter, hoping to have Dianetics accepted in the medical community, submitted papers outlining the principles and methodology of Dianetic therapy to the Journal of the American Medical Association and the American Journal of Psychiatry in 1949, but these were rejected. Much of the medical establishment and the Food and Drug Administration (FDA) were skeptical and critical of Dianetics; they regarded his ideas as pseudomedicine and pseudoscience. During the early 1950s, several Dianetics practitioners were arrested, charged with practicing medicine without a license.

Hubbard explicitly distanced Dianetics from hypnotism, claiming that the two were diametrically opposed in purpose. However, he acknowledged having used hypnotism during his early research, and various acquaintances reported observing him engaged in hypnotism, sometimes for entertainment purposes. Hubbard also acknowledged certain similarities between his ideas and Freudian psychoanalysis, although maintained that Dianetics provided more adequate solutions to a person's problems than Sigmund Freud's ideas. Hubbard's thought was parallel with the trend of humanist psychology at that time, which also came about in the 1950s.

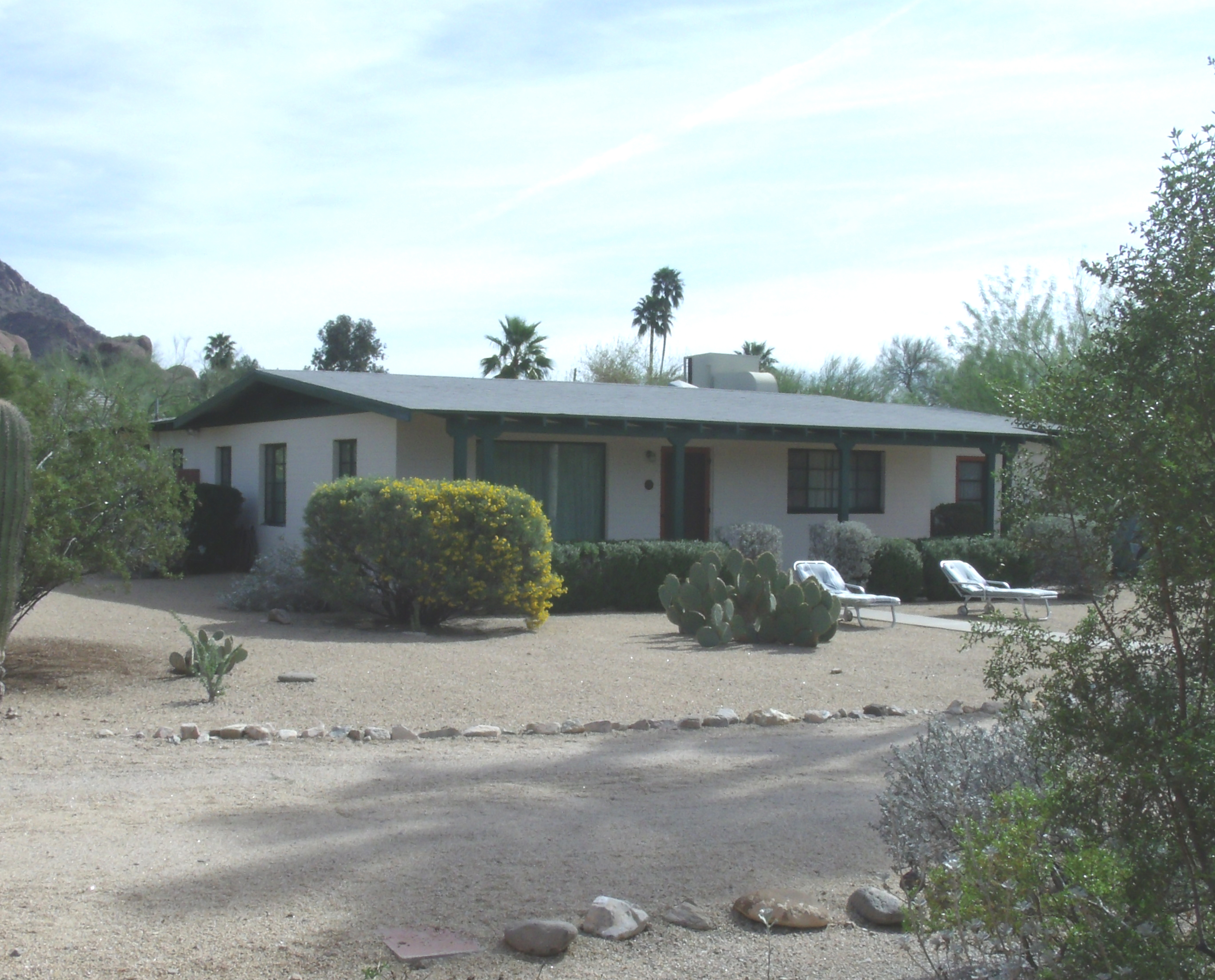
Hubbard's house in Phoenix, Arizona

As Dianetics developed, Hubbard began claiming that auditing was revealing evidence that people could recall past lives and thus provided evidence of an inner soul or spirit. This shift into metaphysical territory was reflected in Hubbard's second major book on Dianetics, Science of Survival (1951). Some Dianetics practitioners distanced themselves from these claims, believing that they veered into supernaturalism and away from Dianetics' purported scientific credentials. Several of Hubbard's followers, including Campbell and Winter, distanced themselves from Hubbard, citing the latter's dogmatism and authoritarianism.

By April 1951, Hubbard's HDRF was facing financial ruin and in 1952 it entered voluntary bankruptcy. Following the bankruptcy, stewardship of the Dianetics copyrights transferred from Hubbard to Don Purcell, who had provided the HDRF with financial support. Purcell then established his own Dianetics center in Wichita, Kansas. Hubbard distanced himself from Purcell's group and moved to Phoenix, Arizona, where he formed the Hubbard Association of Scientologists. Westbrook commented that Hubbard's development of the term "Scientology" was "born in part out of legal necessity", because Purcell owned the copyrights to Dianetics, but also reflected "Hubbard's new philosophical and theological practices". In the early texts written that year, Hubbard presented Scientology as a new "science" rather than as a religion. In March 1952 he married his third wife, Mary Sue Whipp, who became an important part of his new Scientology movement.

=== Establishing the Church of Scientology: 1951–1965 ===
As the 1950s developed, Hubbard saw the advantages of having his Scientology movement legally recognised as a religion. Urban noted that Hubbard's efforts to redefine Scientology as a religion occurred "gradually, in fits and starts, and largely in response to internal and external events that made such a definition of the movement both expedient and necessary". These influences included challenges to Hubbard's authority within Dianetics, attacks from external groups like the FDA and American Medical Association, and Hubbard's growing interest in Asian religions and past life memories.

Several other science-fiction writers, and Hubbard's son, have reported that they heard Hubbard comment that the way to make money was to start a religion. Harlan Ellison has told a story of seeing Hubbard at a gathering of the Hydra Club in 1953 or 1954. Hubbard was complaining of not being able to make a living on what he was being paid as a science fiction writer. Ellison says that Lester del Rey told Hubbard that what he needed to do to get rich was start a religion.

L. Ron Hubbard originally intended for Scientology to be considered a science, as stated in his writings. In May 1952, Scientology was organized to put this intended science into practice, and in the same year, Hubbard published a new set of teachings as Scientology. Marco Frenschkowski quotes Hubbard from Fundamentals of Thought, to show that he never denied that his original approach was not a religious one: "Probably the greatest discovery of Scientology and its most forceful contribution to mankind has been the isolation, description and handling of the human spirit, accomplished in July 195[2], (Note: Earlier versions of Fundamentals of Thought mentioned 1951, however later versions changed it to 1952 which more correctly matches the timeline of Hubbard's movements around the United States.) in Phoenix, Arizona. I established, along scientific rather than religious or humanitarian lines that the thing which is the person, the personality, is separable from the body and the mind at will and without causing bodily death or derangement."

Following the prosecution of Hubbard's foundation for teaching medicine without a license, in April 1953 Hubbard wrote a letter proposing that Scientology should be transformed into a religion. As membership declined and finances grew tighter, Hubbard had reversed the hostility to religion he voiced in Dianetics. His letter discussed the legal and financial benefits of religious status. Hubbard outlined plans for setting up a chain of "Spiritual Guidance Centers" charging customers $500 for 24 hours of auditing ("That is real money ... Charge enough and we'd be swamped."). Hubbard wrote:

I await your reaction on the religion angle. In my opinion, we couldn't get worse public opinion than we have had or have less customers with what we've got to sell. A religious charter would be necessary in Pennsylvania or NJ to make it stick. But I sure could make it stick.

In December 1953, Hubbard incorporated three organizations – a "Church of American Science", a "Church of Scientology" and a "Church of Spiritual Engineering" – in Camden, New Jersey. On February 18, 1954, with Hubbard's blessing, some of his followers set up the first local Church of Scientology, the Church of Scientology of California, adopting the "aims, purposes, principles and creed of the Church of American Science, as founded by L. Ron Hubbard".

In 1955, Hubbard established the Founding Church of Scientology in Washington, D.C. The group declared that the Founding Church, as written in the certificate of incorporation for the Founding Church of Scientology in the District of Columbia, was to "act as a parent church for the religious faith known as 'Scientology' and to act as a church for the religious worship of the faith".

During this period the organization expanded to Australia, New Zealand, France, the United Kingdom and elsewhere. In 1959, Hubbard purchased Saint Hill Manor in East Grinstead, Sussex, United Kingdom, which became the worldwide headquarters of the Church of Scientology and his personal residence. During Hubbard's years at Saint Hill, he traveled, providing lectures and training in Australia, South Africa in the United States, and developing materials that would eventually become Scientology's "core systematic theology and praxis.

With the FDA increasingly suspicious of E-Meters, in an October 1962 policy letter Hubbard stressed that these should be presented as religious, rather than medical devices. In January 1963, US Marshals with an FDA warrant raided offices of the organization, seizing over a hundred E-meters and tons of books and literature. The original suit by the FDA to condemn the literature and E-meters did not succeed, but the court ordered the organization to label every meter with a disclaimer that it is purely religious artifact, to post a $20,000 bond of compliance, and to pay the FDA's legal expenses.

In the course of developing Scientology, Hubbard presented rapidly changing teachings that some have seen as often self-contradictory. According to Lindholm, for the inner cadre of Scientologists in that period, involvement depended not so much on belief in a particular doctrine but on unquestioning faith in Hubbard.

With the Church often under heavy criticism, it adopted strong measures of attack in dealing with its critics. In 1966, the Church established a Guardian's Office (GO), an intelligence unit devoted to undermining those hostile towards Scientology. The GO launched an extensive program of countering negative publicity, gathering intelligence, and infiltrating hostile organizations. In "Operation Snow White", the GO infiltrated the IRS and several other government departments and stole, photocopied, and then returned tens of thousands of documents pertaining to the Church, politicians, and celebrities.

=== Hubbard's later life: 1966–1986 ===
In 1966, Hubbard resigned as executive director of the Church. From that point on, he focused on developing the advanced levels of training. In 1967, Hubbard established a new elite group, the Sea Organization or "Sea Org", the membership of which was drawn from the most committed members of the Church. With its members living communally and holding senior positions in the Church, the Sea Org was initially based on three ocean-going ships, the Diana, the Athena, and the Apollo. Reflecting Hubbard's fascination for the navy, members had naval titles and uniforms. In 1975, the Sea Org moved its operations from the ships to the new Flag Land Base in Clearwater, Florida.

In 1972, facing criminal charges in France, Hubbard returned to the United States and began living in an apartment in Queens, New York. In July 1977, police raids on Church premises in Washington, DC, and Los Angeles revealed the extent of the GO's infiltration into government departments and other groups. Eleven officials and agents of the Church were indicted; in December 1979 they were sentenced to between 4 and 5 years each and individually fined $10,000. Among those found guilty was Hubbard's then-wife, Mary Sue Hubbard. Public revelation of the GO's activities brought widespread condemnation of the Church. The Church responded by closing down the GO and expelling those convicted of illegal activities. A new Office of Special Affairs replaced the GO. A Watchdog Committee was set up in May 1979, and in September it declared that it now controlled all senior management in the Church.

At the start of the 1980s, Hubbard withdrew from public life, with only a small number of senior Scientologists ever seeing him again. 1980 and 1981 saw significant revamping at the highest levels of the Church hierarchy, with many senior members being demoted or leaving the Church. By 1981, the 21-year old David Miscavige, who had been one of Hubbard's closest aides in the Sea Org, rose to prominence. That year, the All Clear Unit (ACU) was established to take on Hubbard's responsibilities. In 1981, the Church of Scientology International was formally established, as was the profit-making Author Services Incorporated (ASI), which controlled the publishing of Hubbard's work. In 1982, this was followed by the creation of the Religious Technology Center, which controlled all trademarks and service marks. The Church had continued to grow; in 1980 it had centers in 52 countries, and by 1992 that was up to 74.

Some senior members who found themselves side-lined regarded Miscavige's rise to dominance as a coup, believing that Hubbard no longer had control over the Church. Expressing opposition to the changes was senior member Bill Robertson, former captain of the Sea Org's flagship, Apollo. At an October 1983 meeting, Robertson claimed that the organization had been infiltrated by government agents and was being corrupted. In 1984 he established a rival Scientology group, Ron's Org, and coined the term "Free Org" which came to encompass all Scientologists outside the Church. Robertson's departure was the first major schism within Scientology.

During his seclusion, Hubbard continued writing. His book The Way to Happiness was a response to a perceived decline in public morality. He also returned to writing fiction, including the sci-fi epic Battlefield Earth and the 10-volume Mission Earth. In 1980, Church member Gerry Armstrong was given access to Hubbard's private archive so as to conduct research for an official Hubbard biography. Armstrong contacted the Messengers to raise discrepancies between the evidence he discovered and the Church's claims regarding Hubbard's life; he duly left the Church and took Church papers with him, which they regained after taking him to court. Hubbard died at his ranch in Creston, California on January 24, 1986.

=== After Hubbard: 1986–present ===
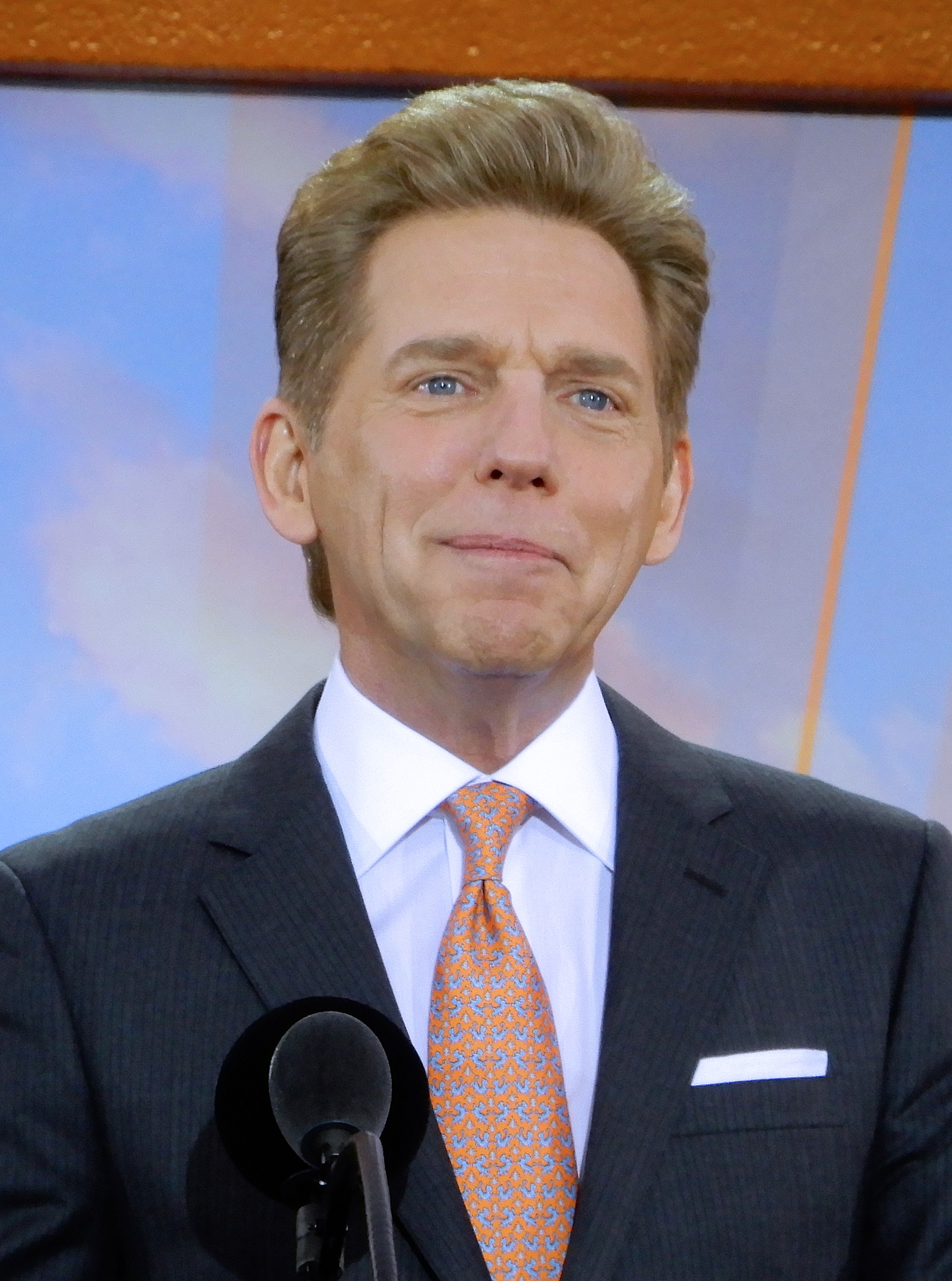
David Miscavige succeeded Hubbard as the head of the Church of Scientology.

Miscavige succeeded Hubbard as head of the Church. In 1991, Time magazine published a frontpage story attacking the Church. The latter responded by filing a lawsuit and launching a major public relations campaign. In 1993, the Internal Revenue Service dropped all litigation against the Church and recognized it as a religious organization, with the UK's home office also recognizing it as a religious organization in 1996. The Church then focused its opposition towards the Cult Awareness Network (CAN), a major anti-cult group. The Church was part of a coalition of groups that successfully sued CAN, which then collapsed as a result of bankruptcy in 1996.

In 2008, the online activist collective Anonymous launched Project Chanology with the stated aim of destroying the Church; this entailed denial of service attacks against Church websites and demonstrations outside its premises. In 2009, the St Petersburg Times began a new series of exposes surrounding alleged abuse of Church members, especially at their re-education camp at Gold Base in Gilman Hot Springs, California. As well as prompting episodes of BBC's Panorama and CNN's AC360 investigating the allegations, these articles launched a new series of negative press and books presented as exposés of the Church.

In 2009, the Church established relations with the Nation of Islam, after which thousands of the latter's members received introductory Dianetics training. In 2012, Lewis commented on a recent decline in Church membership. Those leaving for the Freezone included large numbers of high-level, long-term Scientologists, among them Mark Rathbun and Mike Rinder.

== Dianetics today ==
Dianetics is part of Scientology, and the Church of Scientology views the original Dianetics techniques as an introduction into Scientology. They promote the book in commercials, and streetside where promotion and recruitment events mix Scientology and Dianetics. Church of Scientology buildings are dual-named as Dianetics Foundations, and Book One auditing services are sold to newcomers. The organization opens outreach locations called Dianetics and Scientology Life Improvement Centers which sell beginning books, show films, and hold introductory classes on topics such as communication and marriage.

In the 1990s, DMSMH was heavily advertised because it was not readily associated with the Scientology's fringe-group image. As of 2001, the Church of Scientology continued to run television advertisements promoting the DMSMH book. In spite of this, an analysis of the approximate annual sales of DMSMH that was based on the Church's published data indicated that 2002 sales of DMSMH were similar to sales levels of the book in the early 1970s, and sales of the book reached its peak in the late 1980s. In 1991, Time magazine, alleged that the Church asked its members to purchase large quantities of the book with their own money, or with money supplied by the Church, for the sole purpose of keeping the book on The New York Times Best Seller list.

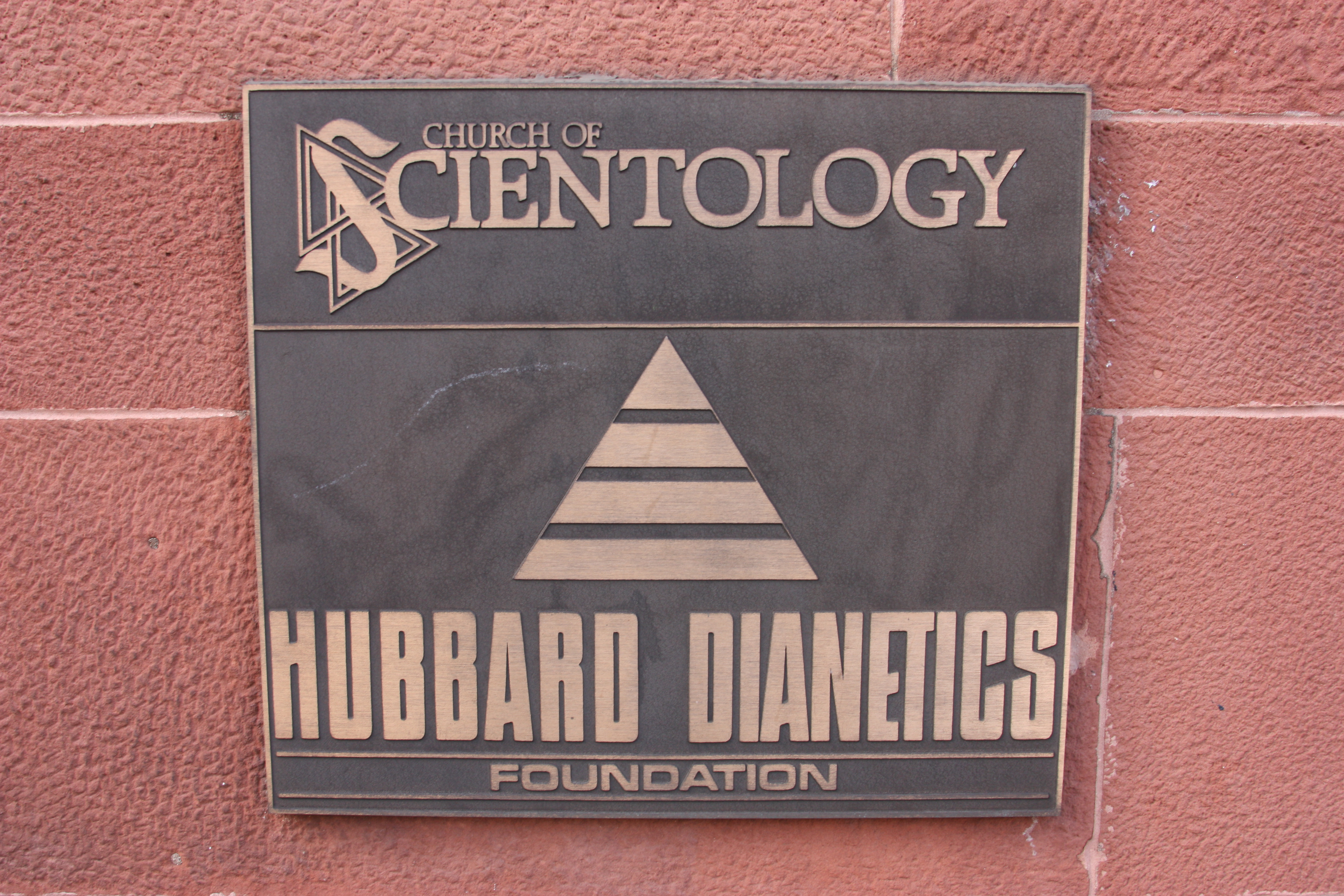
Sign on Church of Scientology in Boston (2011)

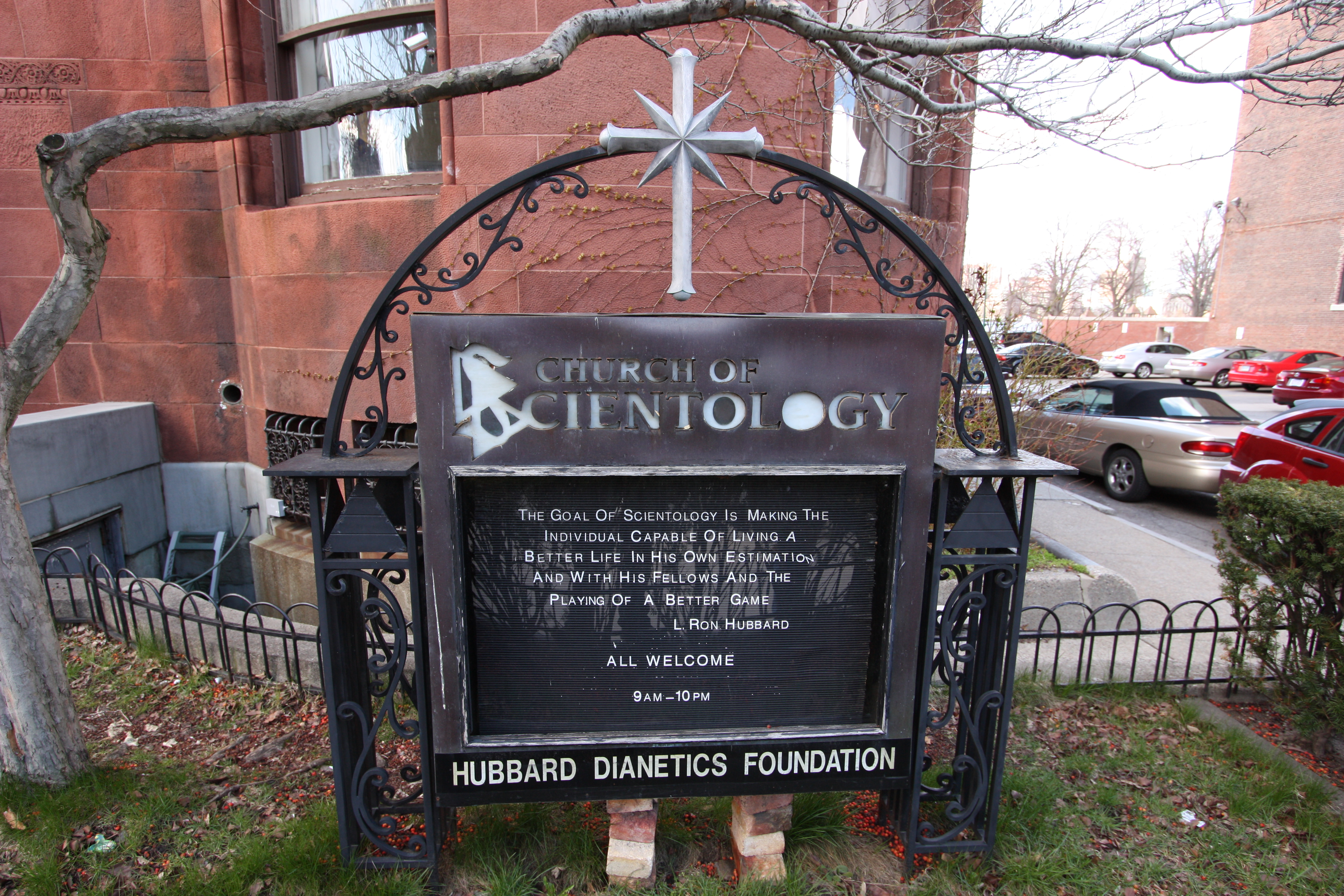
Sign outside Church of Scientology in Boston (2011)

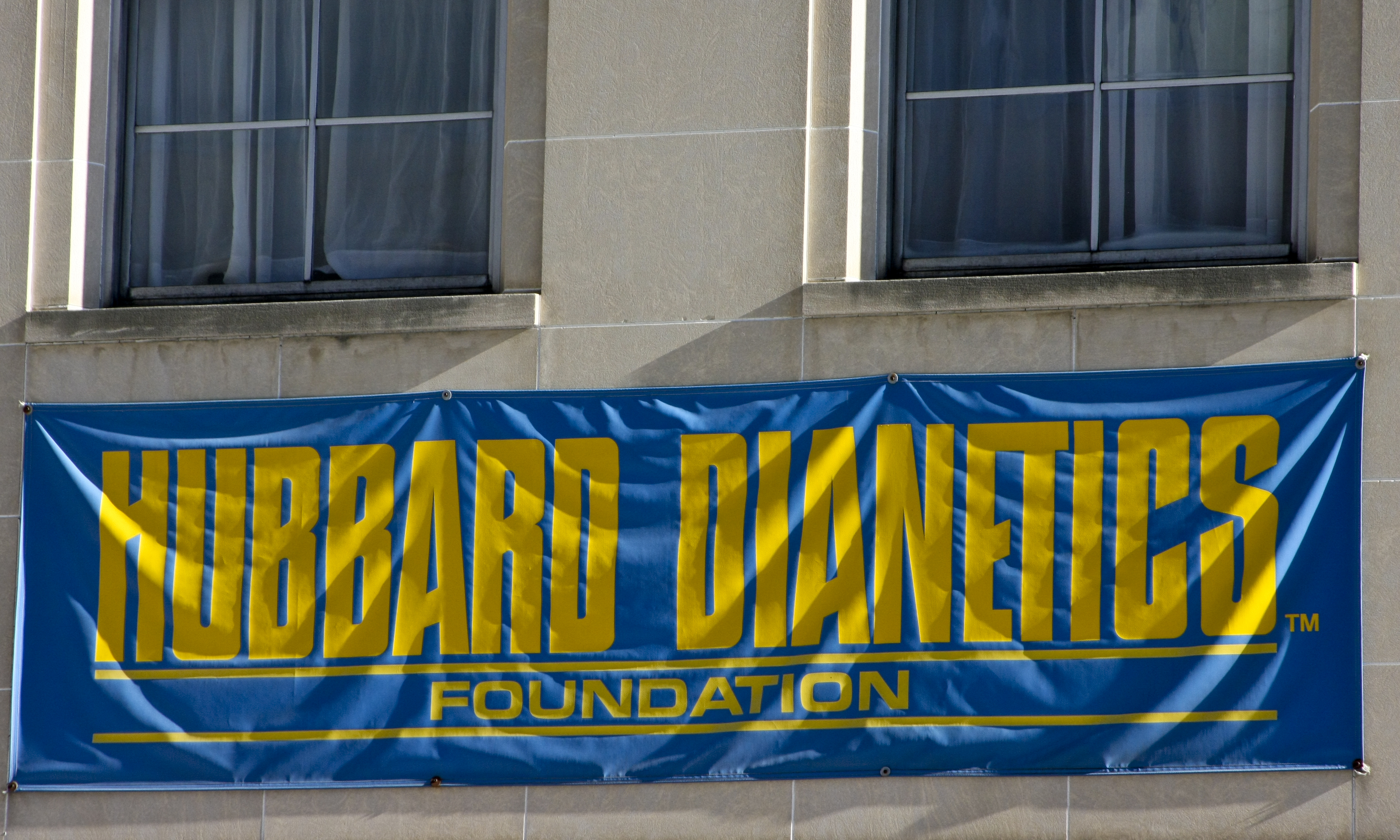
Banner hung on Minnesota Church of Scientology (2008)

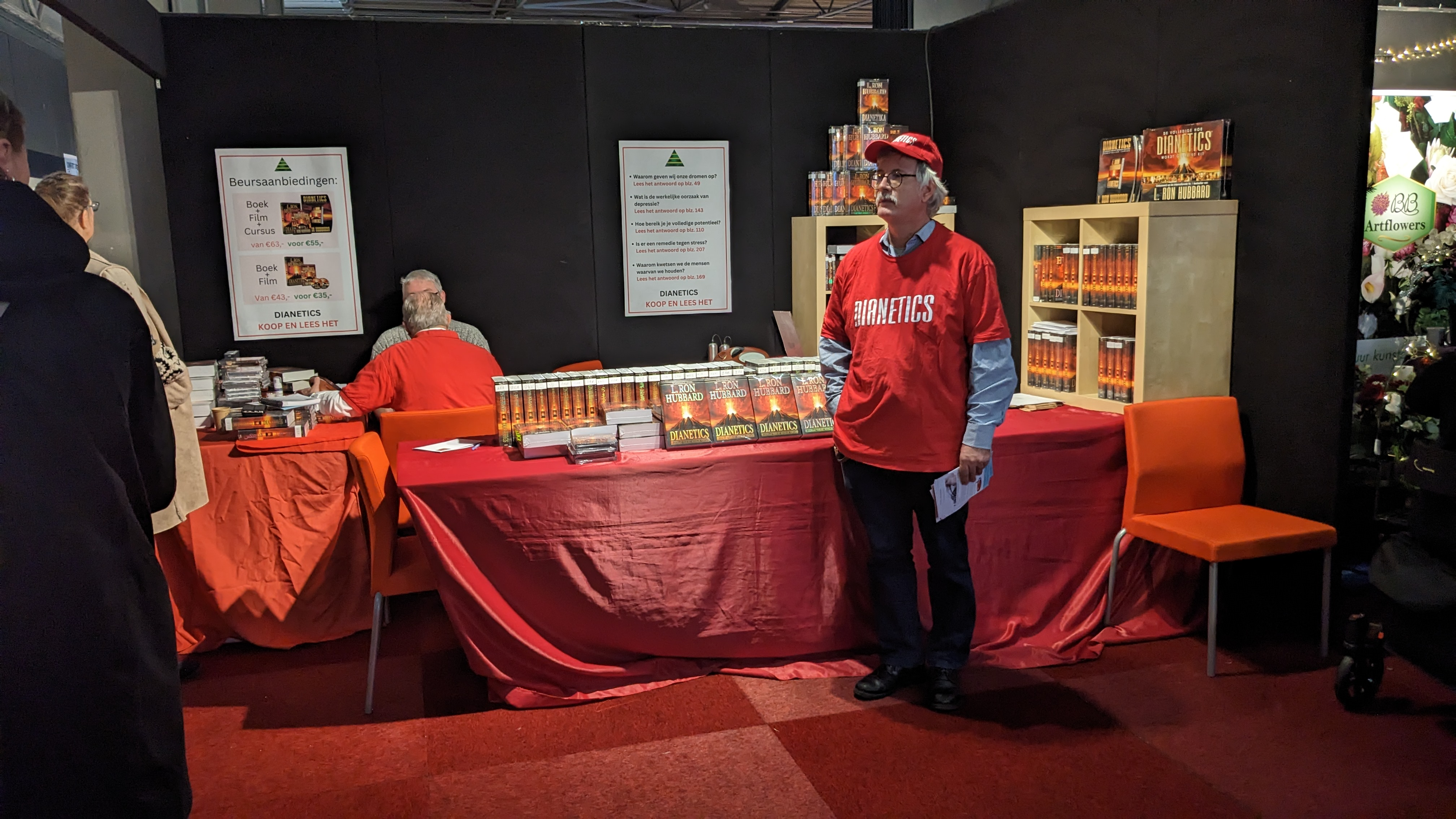
Promotional stand in Rotterdam, Netherlands (2022)

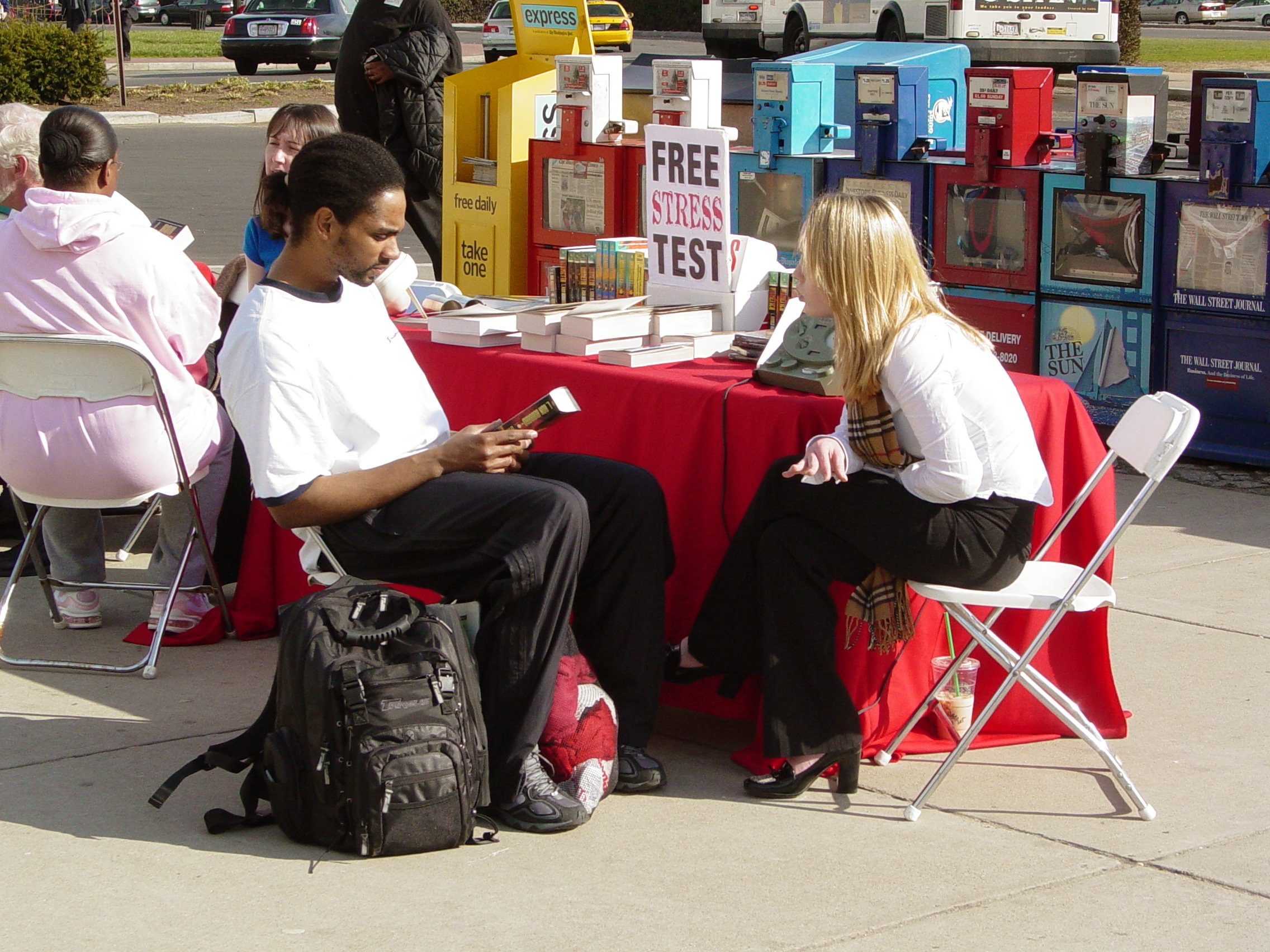
Streetside Scientology stress tests selling Dianetics books (2007)

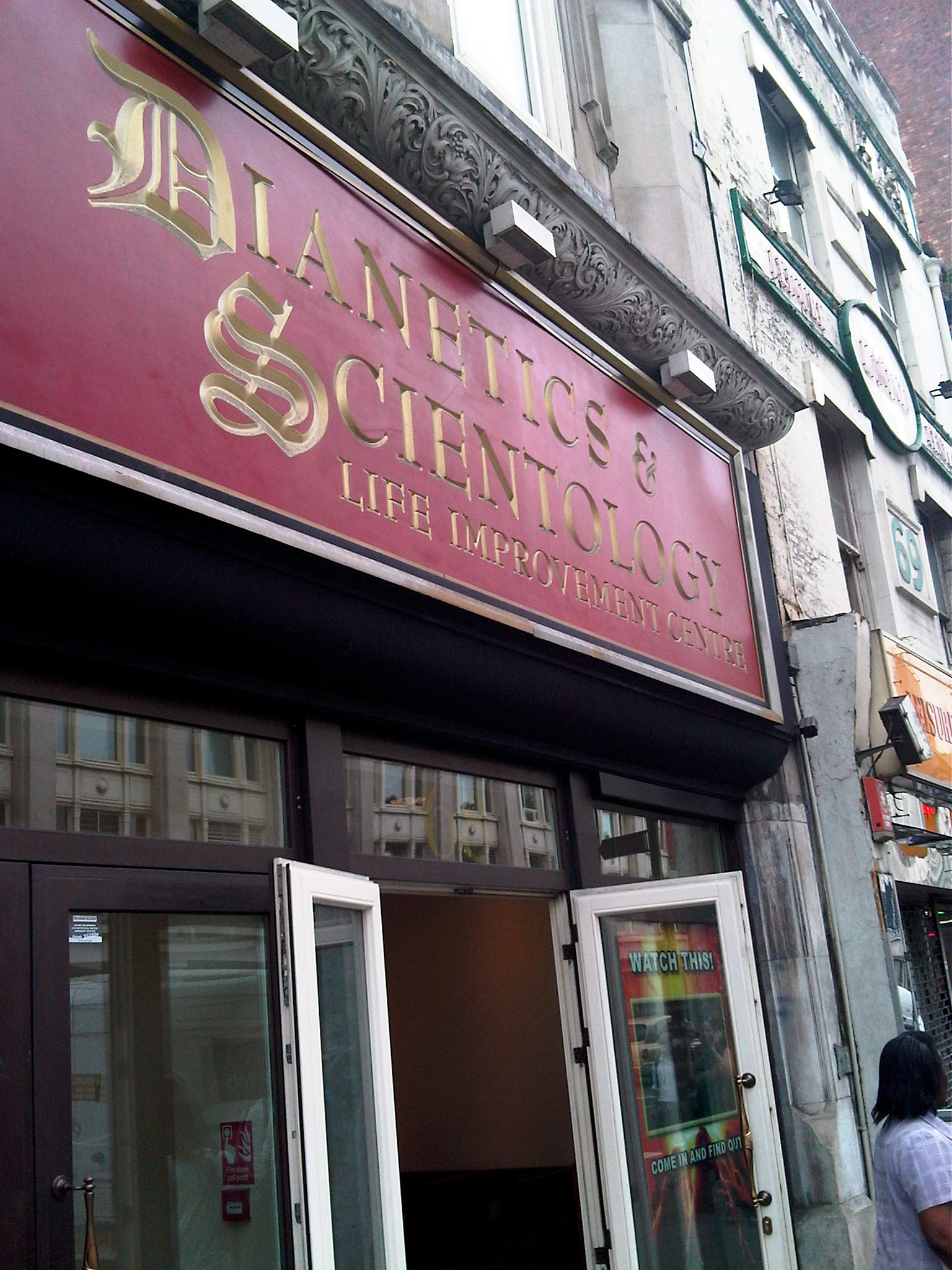
London's Dianetics and Scientology Life Improvement Centre (2010)
