= Dianetics: The Evolution of a Science =

Early book by L. Ron Hubbard

- Early edition
- Author: L. Ron Hubbard
- Language: English
- Publisher: Hubbard Association of Scientologists International Ltd (1955), Bridge Publications (2007)
- Publication date: May 1955
- Media type: Print book
- ISBN: 9781403144188

Dianetics: The Evolution of a Science is a pseudoscientific book written by L. Ron Hubbard. Originally published in May 1950 as an article in Astounding Science Fiction #234, and immediately preceding the publication of his book Dianetics: The Modern Science of Mental Health, it was expanded and republished as a 48-page book in 1955 by Hubbard Association of Scientologists International Ltd. In 2007, it was republished by Bridge Publications as a 213-page book — part of the re-release of the "basic books" of Scientology. The book is considered part of Scientology's canon.

In Dianetics: The Evolution of a Science, Hubbard describes how he defined the reactive mind and developed the procedures to get rid of it. The book includes Hubbard's account of the reasoning behind his development of Dianetics.

== See also ==
- Bibliography of Scientology
- Scientology beliefs and practices
- History of Dianetics and Scientology
