= A Doctor's Report on Dianetics =

1951 critique of L. Ron Hubbard's thesis

- First edition
- Author: Joseph A. Winter
- Language: English
- Subject: Dianetics
- Publisher: Julian Messner; Crown Publishing Group
- Publication date: 1951, 1987
- Publication place: United States
- Media type: Print (hardcover)
- ISBN: 0-517-56421-1

A Doctor's Report on Dianetics: Theory and Therapy is a non-fiction book analyzing Dianetics. The book was authored by physician Joseph A. Winter, with an introduction by German gestalt therapy research psychiatrist Frederick Perls. The book was first published in hardcover by the Julian Press Julian Messner, in 1951, and published again in 1987, by Crown Publishing Group. The work was the first book published that was professionally critical of L. Ron Hubbard.

== About the author ==
Joseph Augustus Winter, an American medical doctor and "psychosomatacist", had previously served on the board of directors and as the medical director of L. Ron Hubbard's Hubbard Dianetic Research Foundation (HDRF). He also wrote the 1950 original introduction to Hubbard's Dianetics: The Modern Science of Mental Health. Winter resigned from the HDRF in October 1950, stating "there was a difference between the ideals inherent within the dianetics hypothesis and the actions of the Foundation". He also felt that Dianetic techniques were potentially dangerous if performed without medical training and disapproved of the lack of scientific evidence supporting Hubbard's claims. Prior to their falling out, Winter had stated that the Dianetic technique of auditing had cured his six-year-old son of fears of ghosts and the dark.

== Main points ==
According to a 1951 article in Time magazine, in A Doctor's Report on Dianetics "Winter tries to filter Hubbard's strange mixture and pick out the scraps fit for human consumption". Winter wrote that auditing could be a useful technique for psychiatrists to use during psychoanalysis and agreed with Hubbard's conceptualization of prenatal "engrams" that traumatic memories can be formed and stored during the prenatal stage, but Winter was skeptical about "sperm dreams", stating they were likely imagined and not true memories.

Winter also objected to patients recalling deaths from previous reincarnations, Hubbard's authoritarian attitude and disregard for using the scientific method, and Hubbard's view that anyone could become an auditor without medical training. Winter wrote that Hubbard's techniques sometimes harmed clients, and that he had yet to observe a single "Clear" (Hubbard's term for people with an allegedly "optimum brain" after being cleared of all engrams). Though Hubbard claimed that a Clear had been obtained after twenty-four hours of therapy, Winter wrote that he never observed an individual reach the state of Clear or display any of the unique abilities Hubbard attributed to a Clear. Winter also believed that some people became psychotic due to their involvement with Dianetics, and he included a case study in the book.

Winter also rebuked Hubbard's "Guk" program, which was a combination of vitamins and glutamic acid that was meant to make Dianetics subjects "run better".

== Critical reception ==
The Princeton Theological Seminary called it an important new book on psychotherapy, in Pastoral Psychology.

Martin Gardner analyzes the book extensively in Fads and Fallacies in the Name of Science. Gardner wrote that the "most revealing" material in A Doctor's Report on Dianetics, were the records of the author's own auditing sessions, which showed that the auditor effectively relied on loaded questions to produce from the client responses validating the Dianetic theory, while ignoring those that did not. Gardner chastised the technique for obscuring the real roots of psychological and psychosomatic troubles.

Pitirim Sorokin wrote in The Ways and Power of Love that though Winter wrote an enthusiastic introduction to Hubbard's Dianetics, his own book exposed some of Hubbard's more "charlatanish" claims.

The book was also reviewed in The American Journal of Psychology and The American Journal of Psychiatry. In a review of the book in Psychosomatic Medicine, Frank Egloff wrote that Winter did a "relatively good, factual job" and provided a "fairly clear, dispassionate view of dianetics".

The book is referenced in Rodney Stark's The Future of Religion, and in Frank Gerbode's Beyond Psychology.

== See also ==
- Bibliography of books critical of Scientology
