= Excalibur (L. Ron Hubbard) =

1938 work by L. Ron Hubbard

- Author: L. Ron Hubbard
- Language: English
- Subject: Scientology
- Publication date: Unreleased
- Publication place: United States

Excalibur (alternate titles: Dark Sword, The One Command) is an unpublished manuscript written in 1938 by L. Ron Hubbard, later the founder of Scientology. The contents of Excalibur formed the basis for Dianetics: The Modern Science of Mental Health (1950) and some of Hubbard's later publications.

== Hubbard on Excalibur ==
Although Hubbard never published Excalibur, he made frequent references to the work as part of his role in Scientology.

In April 1938, Hubbard reportedly underwent a dental procedure and reacted to the drug used in the procedure. According to his account, this triggered a revelatory near-death experience. Allegedly inspired by this experience, Hubbard composed a manuscript, which was never published, with working titles of The One Command or Excalibur. The contents of Excalibur formed the basis for some of his later publications.

By 1957, Hubbard had advertised a "very limited edition" of Excalibur at a price of $1,500 per copy. Hubbard's ad cautions that "four of the first fifteen people who read it went insane". He promised that the work contained "data not to be released during Mr. Hubbard's stay on earth".

In 1962, Hubbard wrote a letter addressed to President Kennedy in which he claimed Soviet agents had stolen a manuscript copy of Excalibur in 1950. In 1964, Hubbard gave an interview claiming that Soviet agents had "offered him $100,000 and laboratory facilities he needed in the USSR, so that he could complete his work".

In an introduction published in 1991, Hubbard writes about his near-death experience. Under the influence of the gas, he speculates that "my heart must have stopped beating". He described his experience as "slipping through the Curtain and into the land of shades".

A published excerpt introduced a story: "Once upon a time, according to a writer in The Arabian Nights, there lived a very wise old man." The old man attempts to collect and distill all the knowledge in the world. After narrowing the work from a massive volume down to a single page and finally a single sentence: "All life is directed by one command and one command only—SURVIVE!"

== Witnesses ==
Multiple witnesses attest to the existence of Excalibur manuscripts.

=== Arthur J. Burks ===
Arthur J. Burks, who read the work in 1938, later recalled it discussed the "one command": to survive. This theme would be revisited in Dianetics. Burks also recalled the work discussing the psychology of a lynch mob. Hubbard would later cite Excalibur as an early version of Dianetics.

In 1938, Burks wrote "The Great Amen", a story about a red-haired soldier who claimed to have come back from the dead. In 1939, Burks published a story entitled "Survival" in Marvel Science Stories.

In 1961, Burks published an account publicly confirming the existence of Excalibur.

=== Forrest J. Ackerman ===
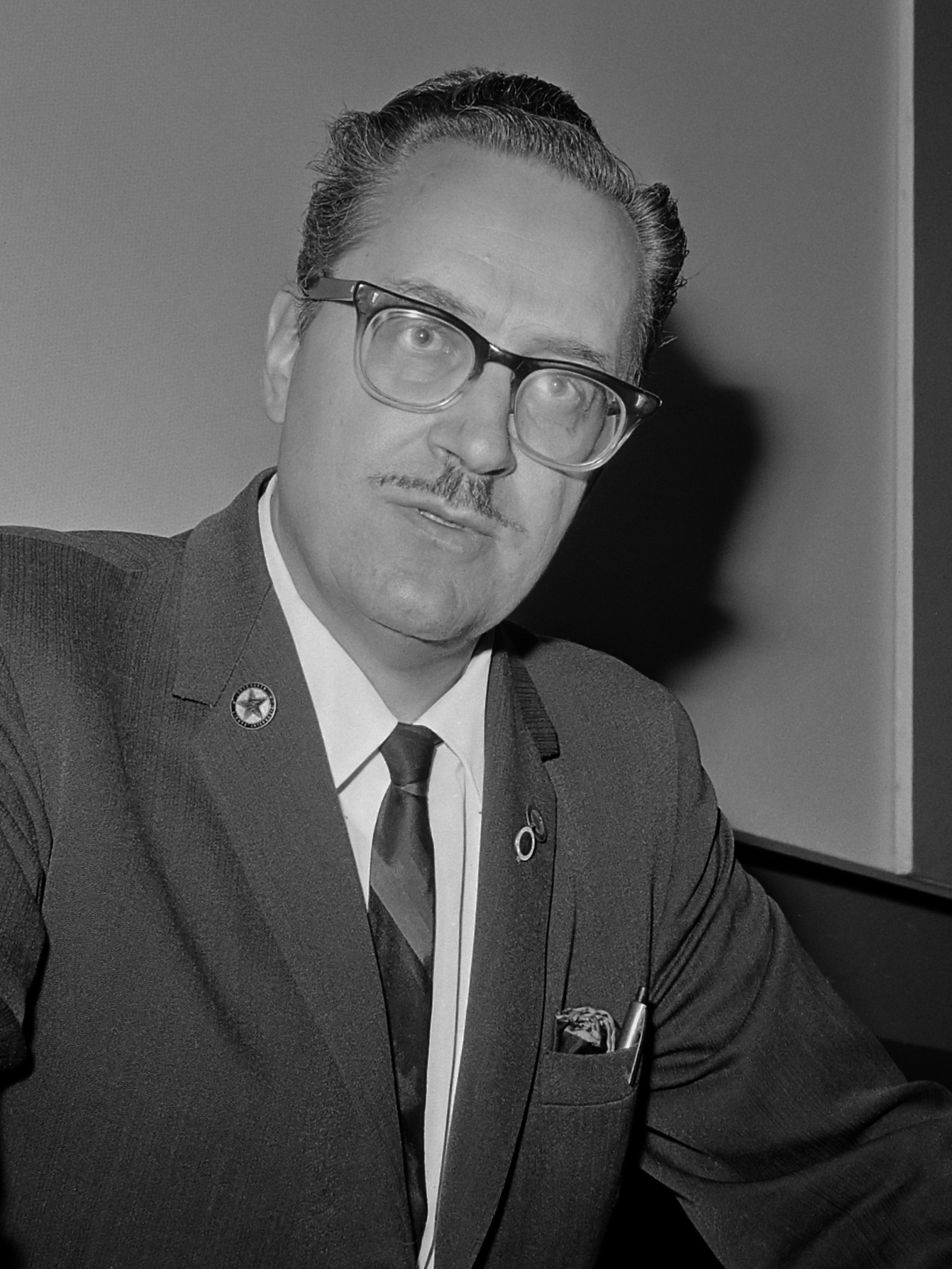
Hubbard literary agent Forrest Ackerman

Forrest J. Ackerman was Hubbard's literary agent in the late 1940s. By Ackerman's account, Hubbard claimed the near-death experience had occurred not in a dentist's office but on an "operating table" sometime "during the war". Finding himself outside of his body, he was drawn to a "great ornate gate". Ackerman recalled that "on the other side of this gate spread out like an intellectual smorgasbord as the SUM TOTAL OF HUMAN KNOWLEDGE!"

In a 1949 letter to Ackerman, Hubbard discusses his work "DARK SWORD -cause and cure of nervous tension – properly – THE SCIENCE OF MIND, really EXCALIBUR". Hubbard promises that the work will give the reader the power to "rape women without their knowing it, communicate suicide messages to your enemies as they sleep, sell the Arroyo Seco Parkway to the mayor for cash, evolve the best way of protecting or destroying communism, and other handy house hold hints." Hubbard assured Ackerman that the book had "more selling and publicity angles than any book of which I have ever heard." In the same month, he told Writers' Markets and Methods magazine that he was working on a "book of psychology". Hubbard cautions his friend "If you go crazy, remember you were warned", adding that a "good publishing trick" is to require that buyers sign a legal waiver "releasing the author of all responsibilities if the reader goes nuts".

=== Gerry Armstrong ===
In 1980, the Church assigned Gerry Armstrong, then a member of the Church's elite Sea Org, to organize Hubbard's personal papers. Armstrong reported the existence of three drafts of Excalibur. Armstrong recalled that "Hubbard had a couple of teeth extracted, and it was while under the effect of nitrous oxide that he came up with Excalibur". Robert Vaughn Young also reported the existence of three manuscript copies of Excalibur among the archives.

== Influence on Dianetics ==
On March 8, 1949, Hubbard wrote to friend and fellow science-fiction author Robert Heinlein from Savannah, Georgia. Hubbard referenced Heinlein's earlier work Coventry, in which a utopian government has the ability to psychologically "cure" criminals of violent personality traits. Wrote Hubbard:

Well, you didn’t specify in your book what actual reformation took place in the society to make supermen. Got to thinking about it other day. The system is Excalibur. It makes nul A’s.

== "Excalibur" symbolism ==
Scientology purchased a ship and Hubbard renamed it "the Excalibur". Hubbard named his youngest son Arthur.
