= Hubbard Association of Scientologists International =

Scientology umbrella corporation 1950s, 1960s

In the 1950s and 1960s, a HASI (short for Hubbard Association of Scientologists International) was an organization where people would go for Scientology training, auditing, books, tapes, and e-meters. There were HASI organizations across the western world. The use of the word "HASI", pronounced "hah-zee" or "ha-zee", could refer to either a local organization or the international management corporation.

[L. Ron Hubbard] is governing director of Hubbard Association of Scientologists International, the operative company of the HASI, over which he exercises complete and autocratic control.

— The Anderson Report (1965)

== Corporate history ==
The Hubbard Association of Scientologists (HAS) was an American corporation formed by L. Ron Hubbard in 1952 in Phoenix, Arizona. HAS was a secular (non-religious) organization for operating a training facility, publishing books, and selling e-meters.

Soon after the birth of HASI and the Church of Scientology, Hubbard began "franchising" (a term he used frequently) new churches through the United States and the United Kingdom. As one former member put it, Scientology had become the "McDonald's hamburger chain of religion," increasingly adopting the mass-production and marketing aspects of American Commerce.

In 1954, the HAS was dissolved and the Hubbard Association of Scientologists International (HASI) was formed as a non-profit religious fellowship to operate as an umbrella organization (the Mother Church) for all of the separately incorporated churches and franchises under it. The HASI sold memberships, and general members would receive 10% discount on books, tape lectures and other items. HASI membership was a requirement to take services at a local HASI.

In the 1960s, management of the Scientology network of corporations was transferred to the Church of Scientology of California (CSC)—which had been incorporated in 1954 under a different name, then renamed "Church of Scientology of California" in 1956. Then in 1981 management was transferred to the new Mother Church, Church of Scientology International. Having lost tax-exempt status for HASI over time, this shifting of corporations and headquarters was designed to transfer management control back under a tax-exempt umbrella, which it finally accomplished in 1966 when Hubbard transferred all HASI assets to the then tax-exempt CSC. It was short-lived, as the Internal Revenue Service stripped CSC of its tax exempt status and all the other Scientology corporations related to it.

As Hugh Urban wrote, "The complex corporate structure of Scientology helped make it perhaps the most lucrative and powerful new religion in the United States from the 1970s onward. ... Scientology's corporate structure was also closely tied to the obsessions with secrecy, surveillance, and information control that characterized the cold war period as a whole."

== Related organizations ==
Hubbard Association of Scientologists International Incorporated
HASI Inc. was incorporated to handle similar functions over operations in England, Australia and South Africa.

Hubbard Association of Scientologists International Limited
HASI Ltd. was incorporated in England and was to receive the assets of HASI Inc. but was unable to obtain non-profit status in England and was abandoned. Shares had been sold to help create HASI Ltd., but when the corporate transfer was abandoned, no refunds were given. Instead, the shareholders were given a lifetime membership in HASI which granted them a 20% discount on services and books.

Hubbard Communications Office (HCO)
HCO was a separate corporation, though frequently occupied the same premises as a local HASI. In the 1960s, a former scientologist described the HCO to the Board of Inquiry into Scientology in Victoria, Australia: "[HCO] is a police force which governs the HASI. It is Hubbard's own police force which governs the HASI organizations throughout the universe. It is separate from the HASI and it ensures that the policy of the HASI is carried out, and it has power to hire and fire members of the HASI. Whether it was on paper this way, I do not know."

International Association of Scientologists (IAS)
Though HASI sold "memberships" to Scientologists, the memberships were just a side business to their main operations. In October 1984, the Church of Scientology started the International Association of Scientologists which differed from HASI in that the IAS was only a membership organization and did not also deliver Scientology services or sell books.
