= Scientology in the United States =

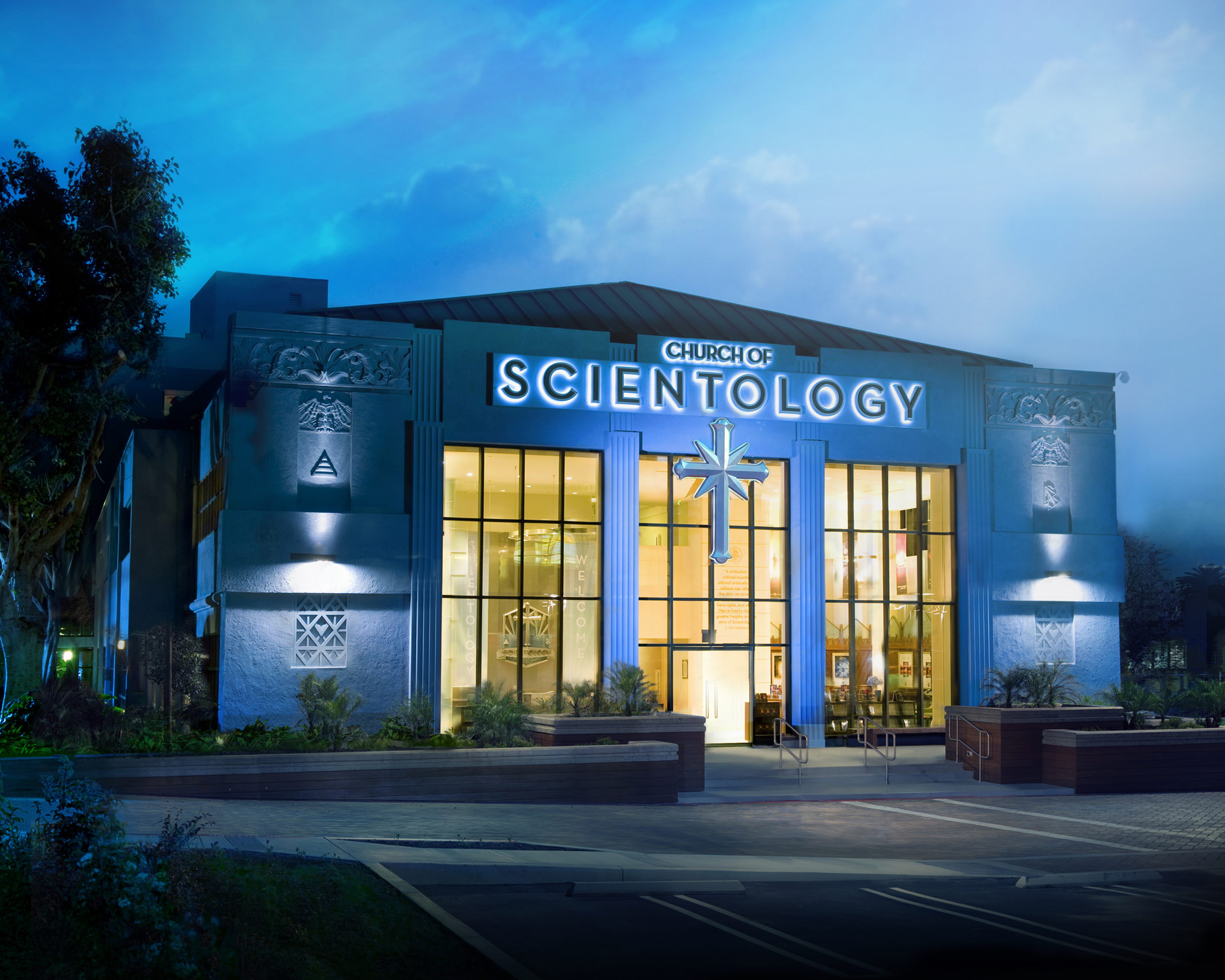
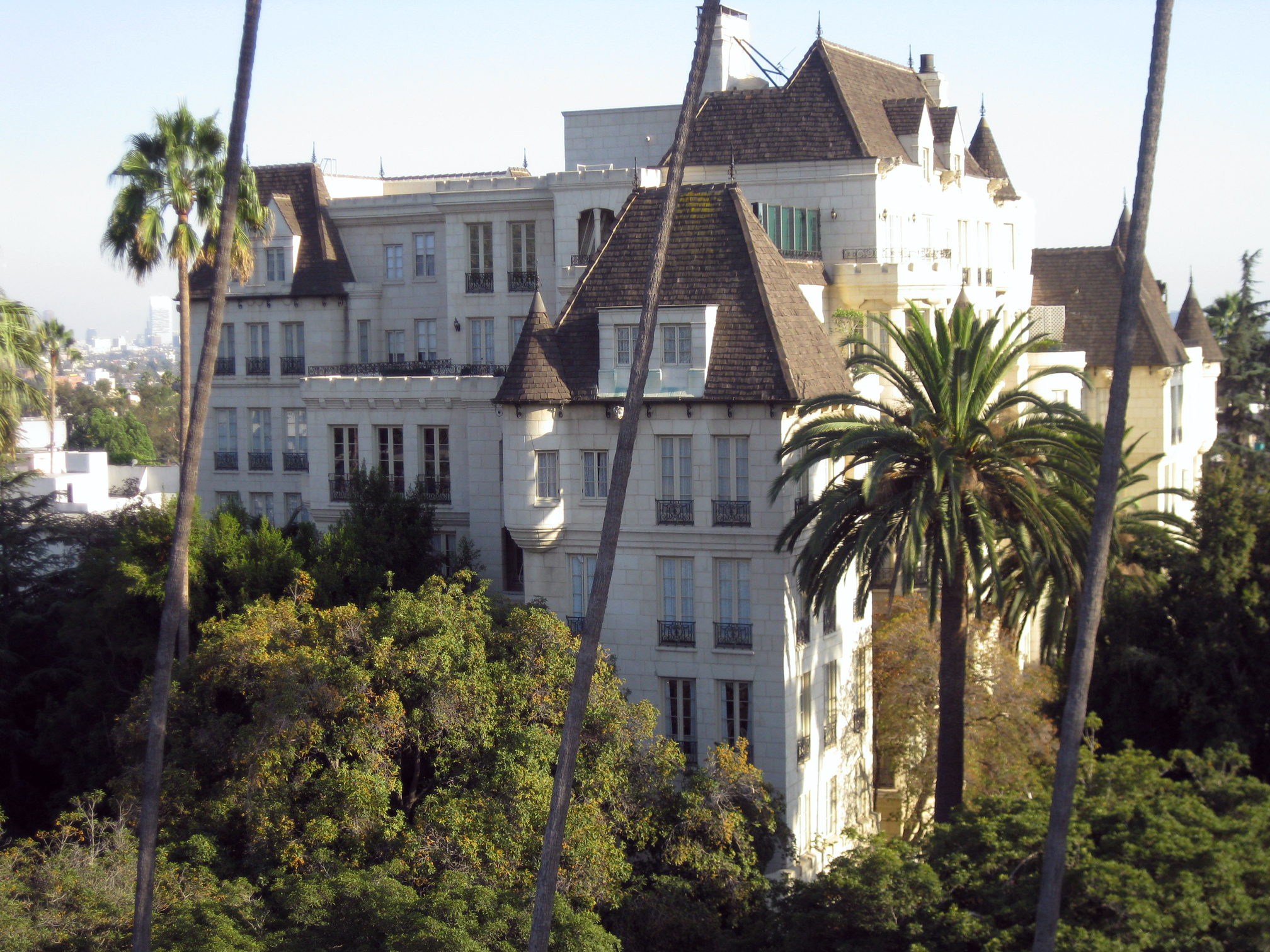
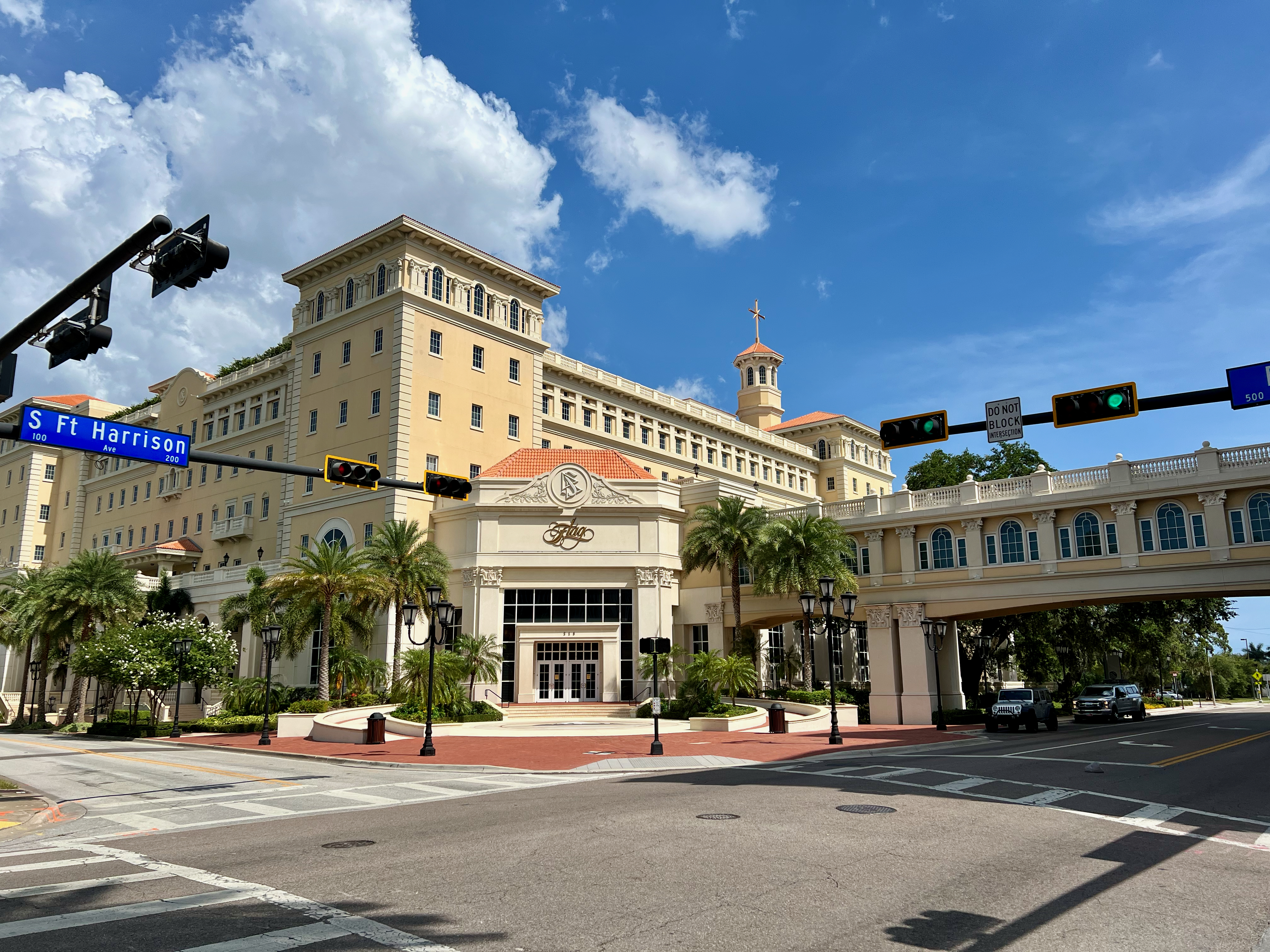
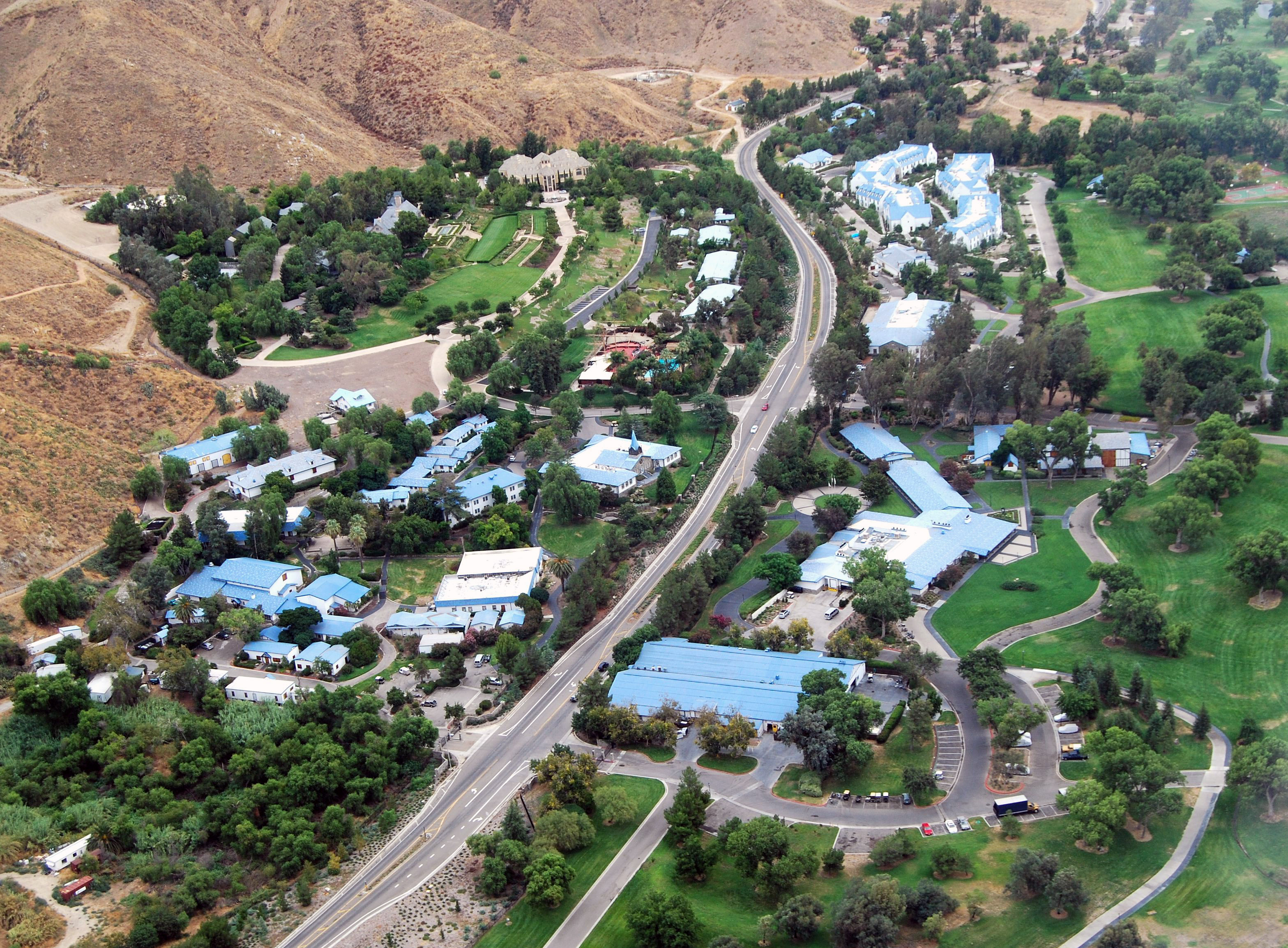
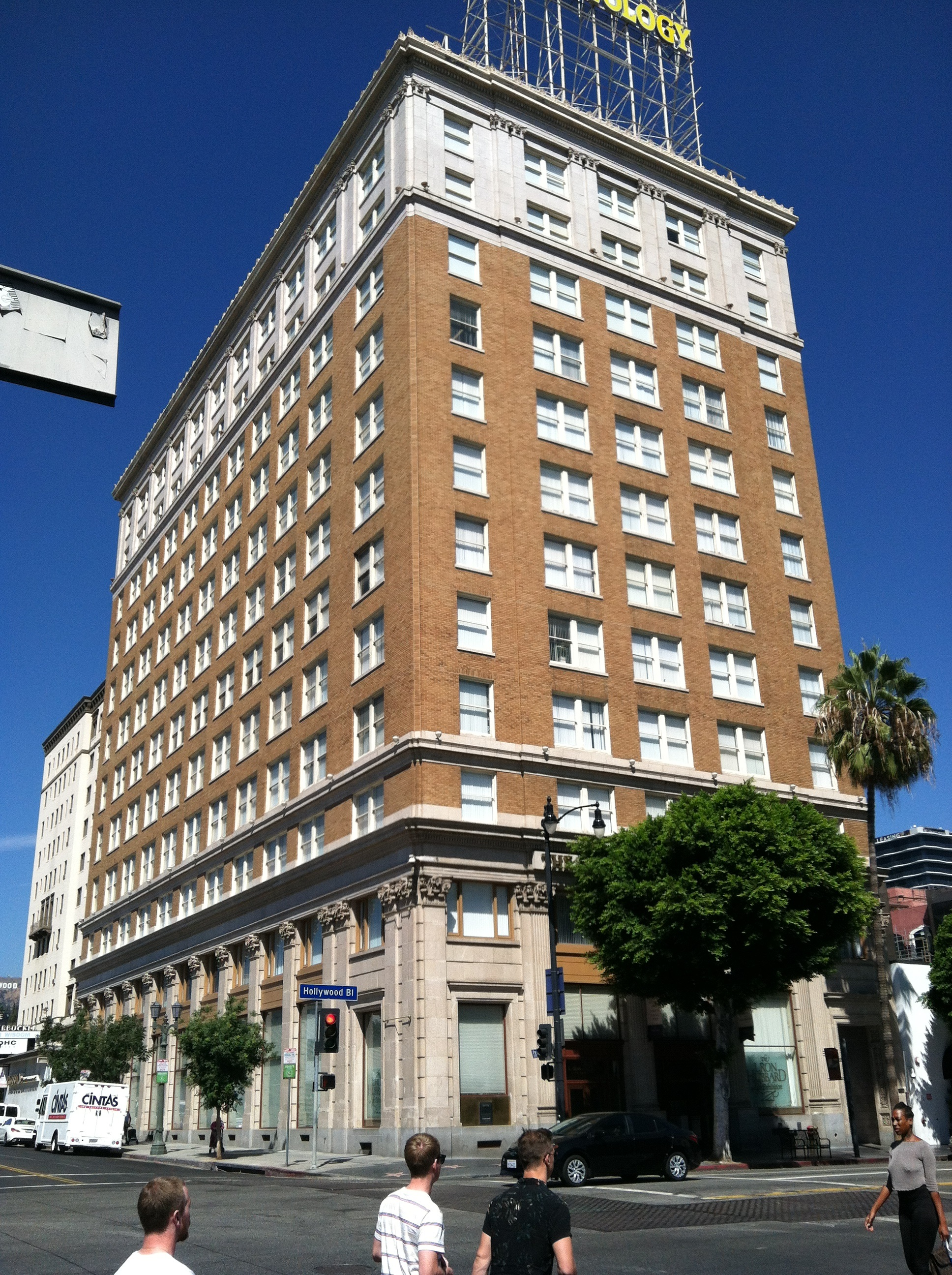
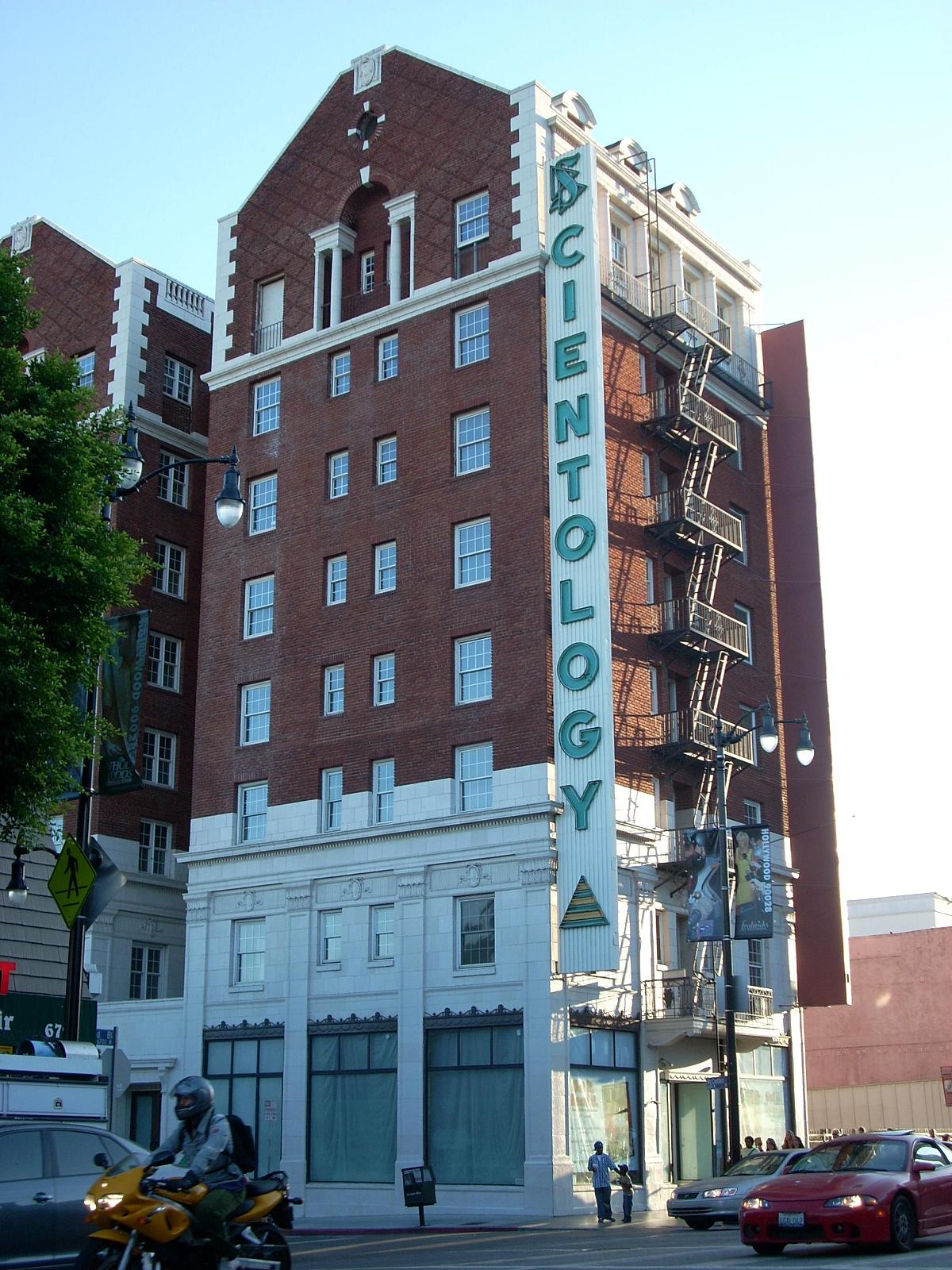
Some of the Scientology owned properties around the country: Church of Scientology of Los Angeles, Celebrity Centre, Flag Building, Gold Base, Hollywood Guaranty Building, Scientology building in Hollywood

Scientology was founded in the United States by science fiction author L. Ron Hubbard and is now practiced in many other countries.

== History ==
Hubbard characterized Scientology as a religion, and in 1953 incorporated the first Church of Scientology in New Jersey.

== Adherents ==
In 2007 an official claimed 3.5 million members in the United States but, according to a 2001 survey published by the City University of New York, 55,000 people in the United States would, if asked to identify their religion, have stated Scientology.

Tom Cruise is the most well known Scientologist in the United States as well as other countries. The organization has an emphasis on recruiting celebrities as L. Ron Hubbard himself said that if an organization has more celebrities, people will follow and offices designed for this use are called "Celebrity Centres".

== Legal status ==
After being recognized as a tax-exempt religious organization in 1957, Scientology's tax-exempt status was lost in a 1967 IRS audit. As part of the effort to regain tax exemption during the late 1970s, Scientologists repeatedly infiltrated the IRS, copying large numbers of documents and at one point placing an electronic bugging device in an IRS conference room. These actions took place within a program code-named "Operation Snow White". Eleven high-ranking Scientologists, including Hubbard's wife Mary Sue Hubbard, were sentenced to time in prison for acts surrounding this operation. Hubbard himself was named as an unindicted co-conspirator as investigators could not link him to the crimes.

The Church then embarked on an aggressive, but more legal course, the church's hundreds of affiliated entities filing a steady stream of lawsuits against the IRS in an attempt to have their tax-exempt status approved. In addition, members of the Church started filing thousands of lawsuits against the IRS, claiming that they were entitled to tax deductions for auditing and training expenses.

They were finally rewarded in October 1993, when the IRS formally announced that the Church of Scientology and all its related organizations (whether for-profit or not) had been granted tax exemption again. Since then, the U.S. Department of State has formally criticized several European countries, including Germany and France, for religious discrimination against Scientologists. In March 1997, the New York Times published an article chronicling "Scientology's puzzling journey from tax rebel to tax exempt" in the United States.

== Controversies ==
- On January 4, 1963, more than one hundred E-meters were seized by US marshals at the Founding Church of Scientology building located in Washington, D.C. The church was accused of making false claims that the devices effectively treated some 70 percent of all physical and mental illness. The FDA also charged that the devices did not bear adequate directions for treating the conditions for which they were recommended.
- The FBI raid on the Church's headquarters revealed documentation that detailed Scientology actions against various critics of the organization. Among these documents was a plan to frame Gabe Cazares, the mayor of the city of Clearwater, Florida, with a staged hit-and-run accident; plans to discredit the skeptical organization CSICOP by spreading rumors that it was a front for the CIA; and a project called "Operation Freakout," aimed at ruining the life of author Paulette Cooper, author of an early book critical of the movement, The Scandal of Scientology.
- The Church of Scientology long considered the Cult Awareness Network (CAN) as one of its most important enemies, and many Scientology publications during the 1980s and 1990s cast CAN (and its spokesperson at the time, Cynthia Kisser) in an unfriendly light, accusing the cult-watchdog organization of various criminal activities. After CAN was forced into bankruptcy and taken over by Scientologists in the late 1990s, Scientology proudly proclaimed this as one of its greatest victories.

=== Washington Post lawsuit ===
In a 1995 lawsuit against The Washington Post newspaper et al., Religious Technology Center (RTC), the corporation that controls L. Ron Hubbard's copyrighted materials, sued to prevent a Post reporter from describing church teachings at the center of another lawsuit, claiming copyright infringement, trade secret misappropriation, and that the circulation of their "advanced technology" teachings would cause "devastating, cataclysmic spiritual harm" to those not prepared.

=== Operation Snow White ===
Operation Snow White was the Church of Scientology's name for a project during the 1970s to purge unfavorable records about Scientology and its founder L. Ron Hubbard. This project included a series of infiltrations and thefts from 136 government agencies, foreign embassies and consulates, and private organizations critical of Scientology, carried out by Church members, in more than 30 countries; the single largest infiltration of the United States government in history with up to 5,000 covert agents. This was also the operation that exposed 'Operation Freakout', because this was the case that brought the government into investigation on the Church.

Under this program, Scientology operatives committed infiltration, wiretapping, and theft of documents in government offices, most notably those of the U.S. Internal Revenue Service. Eleven highly placed Church executives, including Mary Sue Hubbard (wife of founder L. Ron Hubbard and second-in-command of the organisation), pleaded guilty or were convicted in federal court of obstructing justice, burglary of government offices, and theft of documents and government property. The case was United States vs. Mary Sue Hubbard et al., 493 F. Supp. 209 (D.D.C. 1979).

=== Lisa McPherson and the "Introspection Rundown" ===
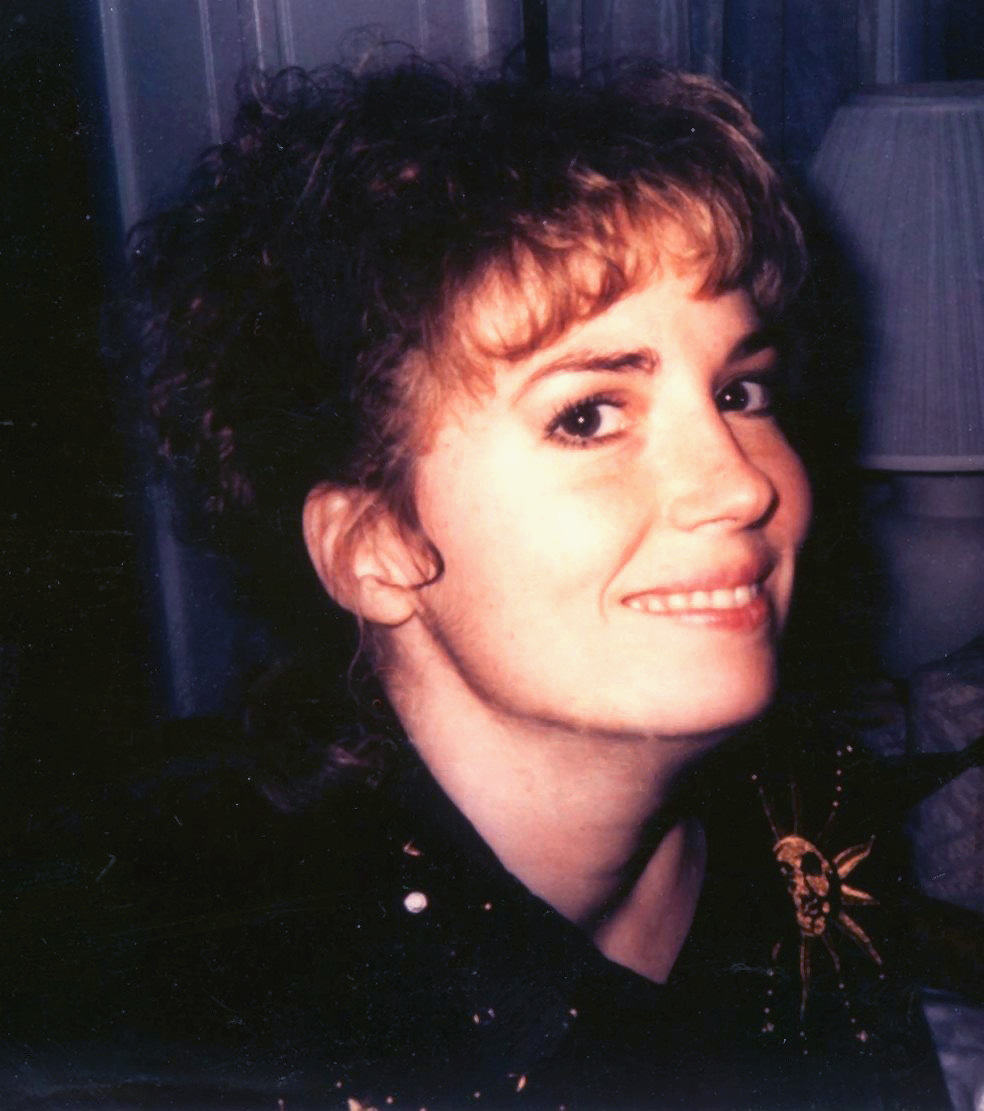
Lisa McPherson

The most widely publicized death of one of the organization's members involved the 1995 death of 36-year-old Lisa McPherson, while in the care of Scientologists at the Scientology-owned Fort Harrison Hotel, in Clearwater, Florida. Despite McPherson's having experienced symptoms usually associated with mental illness (such as removing all of her clothes at the scene of a minor traffic accident), the Church intervened to prevent McPherson from receiving psychiatric treatment, and to return her to the custody of the Church of Scientology. Records show that she was then placed in isolation as part of a Scientology program known as the Introspection Rundown. Weeks later, she was pronounced dead on arrival at a hospital. Her body was covered in cockroach bites. A later autopsy showed that she had died of a pulmonary embolism.

=== Noah Lottick ===
Noah Lottick was an American student of Russian studies who committed suicide on May 11, 1990, by jumping from a 10th-floor hotel window, clutching his only remaining money in his hands. After his death, a controversy arose revolving around his parents' concern over his membership in the Church of Scientology.
