= Wes Johnson =

American actor, cartoonist, comedian and voice artist

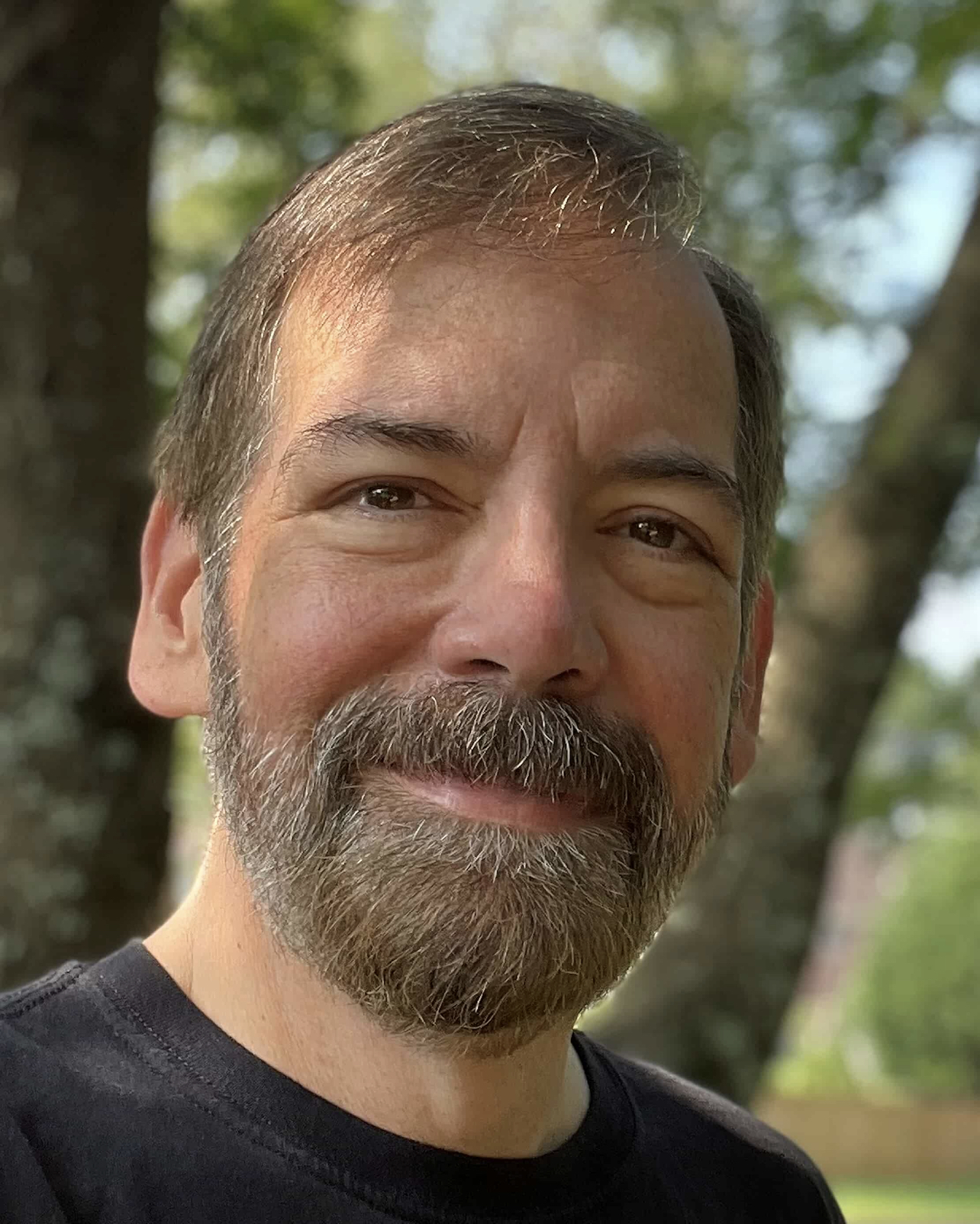
- Johnson in 2021
- Born: June 6, 1961 (age 65); Arlington, Virginia
- Occupations: Actor; cartoonist; comedian; voice artist
- Years active: 1989–present
- Spouse: Kim Barrett
- Children: 3

Wes Johnson (born June 6, 1961) is an American actor, cartoonist, comedian and voice artist, who has appeared in such films as A Dirty Shame, Head of State, The Invasion, For Richer or Poorer and Hearts in Atlantis. He has appeared on television in Homicide: Life on the Street, The Wire, and Veep.

== Career ==
Johnson co-presented with the legendary Wolfman Jack for two years on his last nationally syndicated radio show, writing comedy sketches and performing them with the Wolfman live on a weekly basis. Johnson has written for and appeared in various comedy troupes including Fresh Victims, Gross National Product, and The Loyal Opposition. He also created the comic strips Martini 'N Clyde and Joe Fan, which have been published in The Washington Times and Sports Fan Magazine, respectively.

Johnson is the P.A. announcer for the National Hockey League's Washington Capitals.

Johnson was the series announcer for America's Most Wanted on FOX until December 2009, replacing the late Don LaFontaine in September 2008.

Johnson filmed the pilot Bennie's with Ed Asner in summer 2016. He portrayed a character named "Walter".

Johnson's voice has appeared in cartoons, commercials and video games.

He provided voice acting for three installments of The Elder Scrolls: Morrowind, Oblivion, and Skyrim. He voiced Lucien Lachance, the Gray Fox, the Arena Announcer, Sheogorath, Hermaeus Mora, Emperor Titus Mede II and was the default voice for Imperial males in Oblivion. In 2014, Johnson reprised the role of Sheogorath for the YouTube series Elder Scrolls Lore by the channel ShoddyCast.

He also lent his voice to Star Trek: Legacy, which features the voices of all five original TV Captains, and the video game Star Trek: Conquest.

He appeared in Fallout 3 as the nefarious Mister Burke as well as the Super Mutants Fawkes and Uncle Leo, the Protectrons, Sentry Bots, and Scribe Bigsley. In Fallout 4 he reprised the Protectrons, as well as playing The Silver Shroud and Moe Cronin. In 2015 he voiced the super mutant King Ludd as well as Scribe Bigsley in ShoddyCast's The storyteller: A Fallout Lore Series.

He plays Z'aanta in Square Enix's Octopath Traveller.

Johnson has appeared on The Shari Elliker Show on WBAL in Baltimore, Maryland, Broadminded on XM 155, and reviewed movies weekly for The Chip Franklin Show on KOGO in San Diego, California.

He appeared as a guest narrator for symphonic black metal band Epicland on the album Bound for Greatness.

He appeared in the short films Oblivion in Real Life and Oblivion in Real Life II on the LaFave Bros YouTube channel. Johnson declined payment for his appearances, instead asking viewers to consider donating to the Alzheimer's Association.

He also has a YouTube channel.

== Personal life ==
Johnson is married to his childhood sweetheart Kim Barrett Johnson. They are the parents of three sons.

In January 2025, Johnson suffered a medical emergency while in Georgia to host a benefit event for the National Alzheimer's Association. He was hospitalized in an Atlanta intensive care unit after being found unresponsive in his hotel room. It was reported on January 31 that Johnson had recovered from an induced coma and that he had been released from the hospital.

== Filmography ==
=== Film ===
Year	Title	Role	Notes
1997	For Richer or Poorer	Tourist Man	
1998	The Yard	The Wood Guy	
2001	Hearts In Atlantis	Sports Announcer	
2003	Head of State	Teamster	
2004	A Dirty Shame	Fat Fuck Frank	
2004	Ted's 12	Pete Palmer	
2007	The Invasion	News Stand Vendor	
2015	Sally Pacholok	Dr. Dubrowski	
2020	Volkov Origin	Father O'Malley	Post-production

=== Television ===
Year	Title	Role	Notes
1996	Space Ghost Coast to Coast	Himself	Season 3, Episode 9: "Surprise"
1996	Unsolved Mysteries	Richard	Series 8, Episode 18
1998	Homicide: Life on the Street	Victor Resnick	Episode: "Abduction"
1998–2009	America's Most Wanted: America Fights Back	Announcer / BTK Killer / Prescott Sigmund / Trevor Mitchell	20 Episodes
2001	Sketch Pad	Announcer	
2003	The Wire	Security Supervisor	Episode: "Storm Warnings"
2009	Phineas and Ferb	Additional voices	Episode: "The Chronicles of Meap"
2011	Police P.O.V.	Announcer	
2012	Downunder Horsemanship	Narrator	11 Episodes
2013	Veep	Peter	Episode "Signals" / TV short
2016	Bennie's	Walter	Episode: "Elevator"
2016–2017	The Grindhouse Radio	Himself	3 Episodes
2019–	Urgablob Audio Adventure	Urgablob	1 Episode

=== Video games ===
Year	Title	Role	Notes
2002	The Elder Scrolls III: Morrowind	Boethiah, Malacath, Molag Bal	
2003	Unreal II: The Awakening	Additional voices	
2005	Hammer & Sickle	Additional voices	English Dub
2006	The Elder Scrolls IV: Oblivion	Lucien Lachance, Sheogorath, Imperial Watch and other roles	
2006	Night Watch	Additional voices	
2006	Star Trek: Legacy	Menvek, Klingon Captain, Borg	
2007	The Elder Scrolls IV: Shivering Isles	Sheogorath, Bruscus Dannus, Dyus	
2007	Star Trek: Conquest	Cardassian Officer, Federation Officer, Klingon Admiral #1	
2007	AMF Bowling Pinbusters!	Big Money	
2008	Fallout 3	Mr. Burke, Fawkes, Protectrons, Sentry Bots, Super Mutants, Scribe Bigsley, Swampfolk, Various unnamed NPCs	
2011	The Elder Scrolls V: Skyrim	Hermaeus Mora, Emperor Titus Mede II, Sheogorath, Lucien Lachance, Dremora	
2015	Fallout 4	Moe Cronin, Protectron, The Silver Shroud, Super Mutants	
2017	The Elder Scrolls: Legends	Sheogorath, Arena Announcer	
2018	World of Warcraft: Battle for Azeroth	Maghar Orc (Male)	Archive sound reused in base game
2018	Fallout 76	Protectrons, Mister Fluffy, Boomer	
2020	Fallout 76: Wastelanders	Professor-bot, Sunny, Boomer	
2020–2024	The Elder Scrolls Online	Ard Caddach, Hermaeus Mora	
2023	Starfield	Ron Hope	

=== Short film ===
Year	Title	Role
1999	The Pitch	Pitcher
2003	48 Hours to Romance	Buck Conway / Buddy Johnson
2007	Mr. Comedy	Pie Investigator No. 1
2008	Last Call	Donald Pettiway
2018	Oblivion in Real Life	Voices
2019	Oblivion in Real Life II	Voices
2019	65 Years of the Big Go!	Voices
