= Murder of Elli Perkins =

2003 murder in Buffalo, New York

Elli Perkins
- Born: Elli Present; 1949; Rochester, New York, U.S.
- Died: March 13, 2003; Buffalo, New York, U.S.
- Cause of death: Multiple stab wounds
- Occupation: Glass artist
- Known for: Circumstances of her death
- Spouse: Don Perkins
- Children: 2

Elli Perkins (née Present; 1949 – March 13, 2003) was an American glass artist and a Scientologist who lived in western New York State, working as a senior auditor at the Church of Scientology branch in Buffalo.

When her son, Jeremy, began to show signs of schizophrenia, Perkins attempted to treat him in accordance with Scientology instead of seeking proper psychiatric care. Jeremy's condition progressed to the point where he felt his mother was poisoning him with the vitamin supplements she forced him to take. After a suicide attempt, Jeremy murdered his mother.

The killing received substantial press coverage, with the implication being that Perkins' refusal to allow Jeremy to be treated by a psychiatrist caused his eventual outburst, and her death.

== Early life ==
Elli Perkins, born Elli Present, was raised Jewish; she married Don Perkins, who was brought up with a Christian background. Elli met Don shortly after taking a Scientology course. Before moving to Buffalo, Elli had lived in Rochester and attended the Rochester Institute of Technology. She crafted handmade glass art and traveled to the Sterling Renaissance Festival, an annual renaissance fair in upstate New York of which she was a member, to sell her wares. She also helped to run the Niagara Craft Association.

In 1979, Don and Elli Perkins, both Scientologists, reached the state of "Clear" after taking Scientology courses and receiving auditing processes. The family then moved to California and lived there during the 1980s, where Elli worked at the Church of Scientology's Celebrity Centre in Los Angeles. By the late 1980s, the family had moved back to Buffalo. Elli and Don had a daughter and a son named Jeremy, the latter of whom lived at home and worked for Don's contracting company. In addition to contracting work, Don is a cabinetmaker and carpenter.

== Declining mental health of her son ==
At age 24, Jeremy began to show changes in behavior, telling his father that he was hearing voices in his mind. At that time, Jeremy's parents sent him to join Scientology's Sea Org in California, which they hoped would help resolve his troubling behavior. His treatment did not succeed with the Sea Org, so he returned to his parents within a few months, resuming his job at his father's business.

A family friend said, "Elli strongly believed that psychiatry was an evil", so she would not consult a psychiatrist about her son's mental illness. Scientologists believe that psychiatry "doesn't work". Court-ordered psychiatric evaluations of Jeremy showed that he was displaying symptoms of schizophrenia in 2001. His defense attorney, John Nuchereno, said that his condition declined over the summer of 2002, and that his father had to terminate his employment. His deterioration exhausted the Church's efforts to cure him; they classified Jeremy as a level III "potential trouble source" and banned him from further Scientology courses.

== Search for alternatives to psychiatry ==
After being found trespassing outside of the University at Buffalo on August 14, 2001, Jeremy was arrested and remanded to a local hospital after a court-ordered psychiatric exam confirmed that he had a diagnosis of schizophrenia. Perkins later convinced the court to release her son into her custody. She began to seek out alternative methods of treatment to psychiatry, and refused to allow her son to be treated with anti-psychotic medications. In the fall of 2002, the Perkins family consulted with Dr. Conrad Maulfair, an osteopathic physician and Scientologist. According to Nuchereno, Maulfair concluded that "he was suffering from certain digestive problems, that he had certain chemical toxins in his body, and he needed to be purged of it." Maulfair said he needed to be "energized" through vitamin therapy.

Perkins gave Jeremy the recommended vitamins, but he became highly suspicious of his mother. In a recorded interview, after being asked what concerns he had about taking these vitamins, Jeremy stated: "Well, concerns just that maybe she's trying to poison me or something." In February 2003, Perkins took Jeremy to see Albert Brown, a self-taught "natural healer". Jeremy told Brown in a session: "Sometimes I think I'm Jesus Christ." Perkins wanted to send Jeremy to live with Brown for treatment, but days beforehand Jeremy began to act more aggressive. After consulting with her son-in-law Jeff Carlson, the executive director of the Buffalo Church of Scientology, she was told to give Jeremy "MEST work", or busy-work around the house in order to get him tired.

== Killing ==
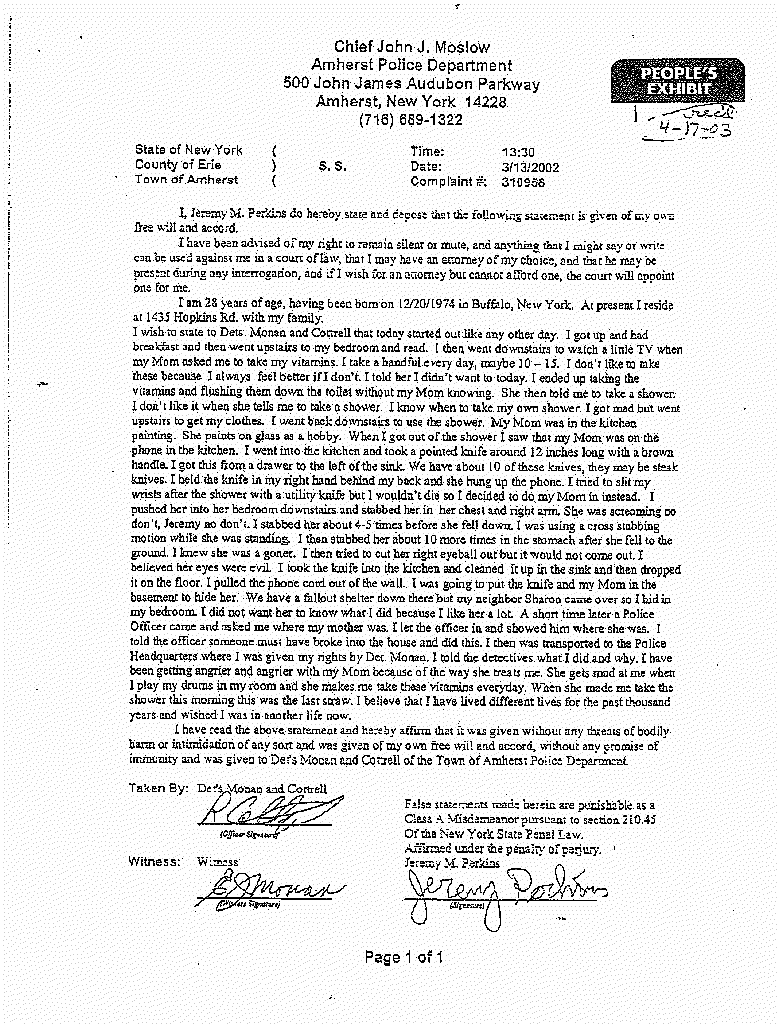
Jeremy Perkins' statement to police

Jeremy was 28 years old when his parents agreed that he should stay with Brown, whose treatment regimen was acceptable to Scientology doctrines. Jeremy had agreed that Brown might be able to help him, and was to leave in the afternoon of March 13, 2003. That morning, Don had to return from work briefly in order to settle an argument between Jeremy and his mother. Later, Elli told Jeremy to take a shower, which he did. When he finished his shower, Jeremy found his mother in the kitchen talking on the phone. He retrieved a steak knife and attacked Elli as she spoke to her friend. According to a statement given to the police, Jeremy stated:

I tried to slit my wrists after the shower ... but I wouldn't die so I decided to do my mom in instead ... She was screaming, 'No, Jeremy, don't.' I stabbed her about four to five times before she fell down. ... I then stabbed her about ten more times in the stomach after she fell to the ground. I knew she was a goner. ... I believe that I have lived different lives for the past thousand years, and wished I was in another life now.

Jeremy said he attempted to cut out her right eye because he thought it was evil but the attempt was unsuccessful. He also made statements like, "She gets mad at me when I play my drums in my room and she makes me take these vitamins everyday. When she made me take the shower this morning this was the last straw." Jeremy's police statement led to a court-ordered psychiatric examination.

Autopsy reports showed that Perkins was stabbed 77 times. In June 2003, Jeremy pleaded not guilty to charges of criminal weapons and second degree murder in a court in Erie County. The district attorney in the case stated that death by stabbing is not unusual in homicides, but 77 stab wounds is "really rare." The court ordered another psychiatric examination for Jeremy.

== Aftermath ==
Jeremy was found not responsible by reason of mental disease or defect on July 29, 2003, and was placed on probation. Six months later, on January 29, 2004, a commitment order was issued which assessed him as "Dangerously Mentally Ill", authorizing him to be committed in a "secure facility of your choosing" by the New York State Office of Mental Health.

According to Rich Dunning, a former deputy director of the Buffalo Church of Scientology, there "was a panic" among the Church's international leadership after the killing, and that there was an effort "to distance the church as far away as they could from Jeremy Perkins." He also stated that the killing was a public relations fiasco as it exposed the dangers of Scientology's ban against consulting psychiatrists, and the belief that members who attain high Operating Thetan levels achieve special powers. Jeremy was later placed on psychiatric medications, which court psychiatrists state have stabilized his condition. Nuchereno said, "Jeremy himself told me that he firmly believes that if he had been taking these medications [earlier] that it would not have happened." After Nuchereno was interviewed on the CBS program 48 Hours, Jeremy was visited by a senior Church of Scientology staff member; Nuchereno was replaced by an attorney whose law firm had worked previously for Scientology.

In March 2006, an advertisement in LA Weekly blamed Tom Cruise and the Church of Scientology for the killing. The ad stated: "Thanks, Tom Cruise and the Church of Scientology, for your expert advice on mental health." The ad recounted the story of Perkins' death, saying she was killed "by the schizophrenic son she was told to treat with vitamins instead of psychiatric care." The advertisement also cited the Web site "PerkinsTragedy.org", as did Salon.

On October 28, 2006, 48 Hours aired a segment on Perkins' death. CBS later reported on the background behind the production of the program, and wrote that they had received complaints from Scientologists: "The Scientology community was not happy with the story, which raised the possibility that Perkins might not have been murdered had her son been given psychiatric treatment." According to CBS, the Church did not provide the 48 Hours production staff with an official spokesman, and attempted to influence the broadcast itself. Scientologists said that CBS had a conflict of interest because pharmaceutical companies advertise on the network's television programming. However, CBS News Senior Vice President, Standards and Special Projects Linda Mason stated: "Nothing could be further from the truth ... At CBS the sales department and the news department – there is a Chinese wall between them. And we just don't cross. And we've done numerous stories on the ill effects of drugs of various sponsors that are on CBS." When questioned about the litigious nature of the Church of Scientology, Mason said that this history of litigation did not influence the show's production, saying: "We do stories that we feel stand on their own grounds in the court of law."

== See also ==
- Death of Lisa McPherson
