= Dedham =

Dedham may refer to:

== Places ==
=== United Kingdom ===
- Dedham, Essex, a village in England
  - Dedham Vale, a designated Area of Outstanding Natural Beauty in the surrounds of Dedham, Essex

=== United States ===
- Dedham, Iowa, a city in Carroll County
- Dedham, Maine, a town in Hancock County
- Dedham, Massachusetts, the county seat of Norfolk County
- Dedham, Wisconsin, an unincorporated community in Douglas County

== People ==
- Molly Dedham, XM Radio host

== Other ==
- Dedham Pottery, a pottery company
