= The Profit (film) =

2001 film by Peter N. Alexander

- The Profit movie poster
- Directed by: Peter N. Alexander
- Written by: Peter N. Alexander
- Produced by: Robert S. Minton; Patricia Greenway
- Starring: Eric Rath; Christine Eads; Jeff Hughes; Jerry Ascione; Ryan Paul James
- Cinematography: Mark Woods
- Edited by: Cole Russing
- Music by: Kevin Storey
- Distributed by: Human Rights Cinema Society
- Release date: 2002
- Running time: 128 minutes
- Country: United States
- Language: English
- Budget: US$2,000,000

The Profit is a feature film written and directed by Peter N. Alexander. The film premiered at the Cannes Film Festival in France in 2001. Distribution of the film was prohibited by an American court order which was a result of a lawsuit brought by the Church of Scientology, although the filmmaker says that the film is not about Scientology. As a result, The Disinformation Book Of Lists and The Times have characterized The Profit as a banned film in the United States.

The film was described by its producers as a work of fiction, meant to educate the public about cults and con men. It was widely seen as a parody of the Church of Scientology and its founder, L. Ron Hubbard. The main character, L. Conrad Powers, leads an organization called the "Church of Scientific Spiritualism", and many elements about both the Church and Powers' life portrayed in the film have been compared to Scientology and Hubbard. The film was mainly produced and shot in the Tampa Bay area, and the cast included actors from the area and cameos from a few Scientology critics.

Representatives from a Scientology affiliated group, the Foundation for Religious Tolerance of Florida came to protest against the film, and the film's producers asserted that they were harassed by Scientologists. Initially, representatives of the Church stated the film had no resemblance to Scientology, but later the Church initiated litigation to block the film's distribution. As a result of a 2002 court order from the Lisa McPherson case, a Pinellas County judge blocked further distribution of the film in the United States. According to the film's attorney the injunction was lifted in 2007, but distribution was blocked due to a conflict with one of the producers, Bob Minton. The film generally did not receive positive reviews from local press, and reviews in the St. Petersburg Times criticized over-the-top acting, and noted that the director should have instead produced a non-fiction documentary piece if he wanted to educate others about cults.

== Plot synopsis ==
Eric Rath plays a paranoid cult leader named L. Conrad Powers (a parody of L. Ron Hubbard), whose organization is called the "Church of Scientific Spiritualism." The narrative starts with Leland Conrad Powers getting interested in cults and he watches a Black Mass from behind a tree being performed by Zach Carson. Carson invites Powers to perform the "Caliban Working" and afterwards Carson gives Powers $20,000 to sell sailboats. Powers sails off with the boat, the money, and Helen Hughes. In retribution, Carson evokes Satan to summon a typhoon.

The film often takes the form of parody. One of the church followers in the film creates a device that can read thoughts, called a "Mind Meter." Scientologists use a similar-looking device, the e-meter, as an aid in Scientology counseling, claimed to measure the "mass of a thought". Other elements in the film that have been cited as similar to L. Ron Hubbard and Scientology include conflict with the Internal Revenue Service, an infiltration of the Federal Bureau of Investigation, usage of military uniforms and science fiction theology. L. Conrad Powers is supported in the film by a "Tom Cruise-style celebrity," before eventually becoming a "reclusive demagogue."

== Production ==
The film's director stated that the script was based upon a fictional character he had created with "many parallels to reality." Filming took place over the course of eight weeks during the summer of 2000, with locations near Fort De Soto Park, Ybor City and Tampa Bay, Florida. Half of the cast came from Tampa Bay, Florida, and cameo appearances by Scientology critics included Bob Minton, Stacy Brooks, Jesse Prince and Ken Dandar. Costume and design themes hearkened back to the Citizen Kane period. Bob Minton funded the film, and invested almost US$2.5 million into the piece.

According to the director, the film's cast and crew faced harassment from Scientologists throughout production. Representatives from the Foundation for Religious Tolerance of Florida — a Scientology front group — came to the shooting sites of the film and handed out fliers which demeaned the film's financial backers. They followed crew members home in order to "press them for information about the content of the film." In addition to the protests, promotional videos shipped to Cannes, France were reported to have disappeared, and Alexander believed that an individual disguised as himself came to pick up the videos.

The founder of the Foundation for Religious Tolerance of Florida, Mary DeMoss of Clearwater, Florida, characterized the movie as a "hate propaganda film," denied that anyone from her foundation followed crewmembers home and stated that the fliers were passed out in order to let crew members know "who was behind this."

== Church of Scientology's response ==
Initially in response to the film, Church of Scientology spokesman Ben Shaw agreed with the film's director that "the movie is fiction and has nothing to do with Scientology." Notwithstanding the fictional elements of the film, the Church of Scientology took legal action against the film makers after a handful of test screenings in Florida. The Church said that the film was intended to influence the jury pool in the wrongful death case of a Scientologist, Lisa McPherson, who died while in the care of the Church of Scientology in Clearwater, Florida. In response to the lawsuit, Pinellas County, Florida, Judge Robert Beach issued a court order in April 2002 enjoining The Profit from worldwide distribution for an indefinite period. As part of the decision, Church of Scientology attorneys were barred from seeking any information about the film's production.

In November 2002, Bob Minton, one of the film's producers, filed a lawsuit against Peter Alexander in order to see the financial accounts of the film's production. According to the St. Petersburg Times, "Minton went from being Scientology's archenemy to a cooperating witness who wanted out of an expensive fight against the church." Though a contract signed by Minton and Alexander guaranteed either partner to demand an accounting of the film's finances, Alexander would not let Minton see the books. Peter Alexander's attorney "accused Minton of doing the church's bidding by attacking Alexander and a movie that could be interpreted as being critical of Scientology." A spokesman for the Church of Scientology denied any involvement in Minton's lawsuit. The court issued an order, compelling the two parties to arbitration. In 2003, Alexander filed in state court in Florida, seeking a writ of certiorari in the matter, and the court found in Alexander's favor and reversed the decision of the lower court.

== Reception ==
Tampa Bay's 10 reported on the opening of the film at the Cinema Cafe in Clearwater, Florida on August 24, 2001, noting the film's controversial nature, and the fact that it appeared to be an exposé of the Church of Scientology. The report stated that a subtle message of the film was director Alexander's critique of Scientology and his motivation to bring information about it to the public. In an interview with Tampa Bay's 10, Alexander stated he was trying to expose a hoax, and give others insight into "what it is that makes people join cults." Fox 13 News called the film's portrayal of the Church of Scientific Spirituality as "oddly similar to the real world's Church of Scientology," while reporting that Alexander asserted character L. Conrad Powers was actually a composite character, based on several "alleged cult leaders." Alexander stated in an interview with FOX 13 News, that he felt he could better inform others about cults through a fictional portrayal than he could have through a documentary.

The film was not well received in a review in the St. Petersburg Times. The reviewer described the movie as "stilted", debunked Alexander's statements that the film was not based on the life of L. Ron Hubbard, and drew several parallels between the plot of the film and Hubbard's life. The review critiqued the length the story went to make a point, stating "Cultists may be capable of the acts The Profit describes, but this story comes across as farfetched rather than convincing." Eric Rath's performance as "L. Conrad Powers" was seen as "over the top", and the review characterized the film on the whole as "National Enquirer-style entertainment."

In a separate review in the St. Petersburg Times, Steve Persall did not view the film in high regard. Persall noted that although Peter Alexander stated the film was a "warning against the influence of religious cults," and not based on Scientology specifically, he thought that "The Profit is a rant against Hubbard and Scientology, no matter how many cults the filmmakers claim to have researched and incorporated into the story." Persall expressed frustration when Alexander did not answer specific questions about his inspiration and influences used in the film, citing concerns that: "the evil empire will jump all over whoever else is going to show it next." Though the review was not favorable, Persall wrote that the film would have been a more powerful piece as a truthful documentary, and not a parody, writing: "The Profit would make a stronger statement if Alexander used his Scientology experience to produce a documentary or a no-holds-barred version of Hubbard's life that calls him Hubbard."

The film is cited in Russ Kick's 2004 work, The Disinformation Book of Lists, as one of "16 Movies Banned in the U.S.," in between the 1987 film Superstar: The Karen Carpenter Story and Ernest and Bertram, from 2002. Kick described the film as "obviously based on L. Ron Hubbard and the Church of Scientology." He recounted how the Church of Scientology changed tactics midstep, writing that "Lawyers and spokespeople for the Church professed that the movie bore absolutely no resemblance to Scientology, then turned around and sued the filmmakers after it had been showing for a few weeks." Kick ended his segment on the film by writing that "The litigation continues..." In October 2007, The Times discussed The Profit as part of an article on blasphemy in film. The Times noted that the film depicted a con man who had started a religion in order to become wealthy, and noted that the film is "banned in the US because of a lawsuit taken out against it by The Church of Scientology," even though the filmmaker stated the film does not depict L. Ron Hubbard. In October 2010, Andre Soares of Alt Film Guide noted that the Spanish website Cineol.net included The Profit in "a list of the top ten movies censored and/or banned in Spain". José Hernández of Cineol.net noted that the film was banned due to a court order, and might never be seen other than in a clandestine manner.

== Cast ==
- Eric Rath as Leland Conrad Powers
- Cliff Roca as Mitchell Cabot
- Jeff Hughes as Zack Carson
- Christine Eads as Helen Hughes
- Margaret Mary Bastick as Dr. Mary Kimbrough
- Lanny Fuettere as Jack Hunt
- Jane Eaton as Babs Lewis
- Cheryl Bourque as Sally Ann Semple
- David Abrams as Vern Maffitt

== See also ==
- Banned films
- List of fictional religions
- Parody religion
- Religious satire
- Scientology in popular culture
