= Broadminded =

Broadminded may refer to:

- Broadminded (radio program), a daily talk and entertainment show on SIRIUS XM
- Broadminded (film), a 1931 American Pre-Code comedy film
