= Stacy Brooks =

Former Scientologist turned critic

Stacy Brooks recounts her story about the time she and her husband were trying to leave Scientology's Sea Org ten years before.

Stacy Brooks (born April 8, 1952) was a Scientologist for over 20 years, working in the Sea Org in Los Angeles for almost fifteen. In 1985, Stacy Brooks was the managing editor of Freedom magazine.

Previously married to Vaughn Young, in 1997 Stacy described being assigned to be a guard for a woman in 1988 who was being run through the Introspection Rundown. The woman "thought she was a butterfly and a dog", and she was being "kept for two months in a shack with a bare mattress and dirt floors in a Scientology compound east of Los Angeles."

== Critic of Scientology ==
Some time after leaving Scientology in 1989, Brooks joined the Lisa McPherson Trust where she was president.

Brooks served as an expert witness in many high-profile Scientology lawsuits, and has made many television appearances criticizing Scientology, on programs including Dateline, 20/20 and 60 Minutes.

== See also ==
- Bob Minton
- Lisa McPherson Trust
- Death of Lisa McPherson
