= Bob Minton =

Critic of Scientology

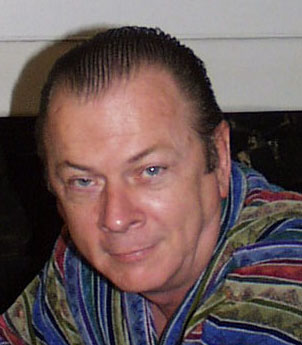
- Born: Robert Schenk Minton Jr. October 3, 1946; Nashville, Tennessee, U.S.A.
- Died: January 20, 2010 (aged 63); Clonbur, Ireland
- Occupations: Retired banker; human rights activist
- Notable work: Founder, Lisa McPherson Trust
- Awards: Leipzig Human Rights Award; Leo J. Ryan Award

Minton receives Leipzig Human Rights Award, 2000

Minton receives Leo J. Ryan Award, 2001

Robert Schenk Minton (October 3, 1946 – January 20, 2010) was a millionaire who helped finance lawsuits against the Church of Scientology.

== Criticism of Scientology ==
Minton became a critic of Scientology after reading about its attacks on critics and internet free speech. He appeared on several news programs discussing his criticism of Scientology and the harassment from the Church of Scientology. This included a featured appearance on the June 16, 1998, broadcast of the television news program Dateline NBC. Later that year, he appeared in an A&E "Investigative Reports" installment called "Inside Scientology" which aired in December.

Minton spent over $10 million fighting Scientology. This included about $2 million he spent on the Lisa McPherson wrongful death case; Minton also offered a reward of $360,000 to anyone who would leave Scientology with enough information to cause the organization to lose its federal tax exemption. The amount of money was based on the amount of money critics say Scientology charges for courses. In November 1997, he spent $260,000 to buy a house for a cat sanctuary for former Scientologists Vaughn and Stacy Young.

Minton also gave money to a number of other church critics, including three people whom Scientology accuses of infringement of its copyrights. Minton also distributed $25,000 or $30,000 to a Swiss ex-Scientologist called Jean-Luc Barbier, who was suing the cult, and gave $250,000 to a French attorney. He also participated in demonstrations in front of the Boston Headquarters of the Church of Scientology near his Beacon Hill home.

After reports by Scientology alleging fraud in his Nigerian businesses, Minton successfully sued two German Scientology entities and a spokeswoman for a permanent injunction preventing them from repeating the libel. The decision was confirmed on appeal.

== Lisa McPherson Trust ==
In 1999, Minton founded the Lisa McPherson Trust (LMT) which brought a civil suit against the Church of Scientology for the wrongful death of Lisa McPherson and provided legal assistance to former Scientologists who alleged maltreatment or abuse by the Church.

The trust operated out of Clearwater, Florida, home to Flag Land Base, Scientology's spiritual headquarters. Supporters of the Lisa McPherson Trust engaged in picketing outside Church of Scientology buildings in Clearwater, and there were frequent confrontations between the LMT and Scientologists.

In 2000, Minton was the first recipient of the "Alternative Charlemagne Award" from the European-American Citizens Committee for Human Rights and Religious Freedom.

In 2001, for his work with LMT, Bob Minton received the Leo J. Ryan Award from the Leo J. Ryan Education Foundation "in recognition of his extraordinary courage, tenacity and perseverance in the battle against tyranny over the mind of man."

== Hubbard parody film ==
Minton produced and funded the film The Profit, costing him about $2.5 million. The film was a presented as a work of fiction, meant to educate the public about cults and con men, but was widely seen as a parody of the Church of Scientology and its founder, L. Ron Hubbard.

== Opposition from Scientology ==
In his 2022 book A Billion Years: My Escape From a Life in the Highest Ranks of Scientology, Mike Rinder writes how he and Marty Rathbun were pressured daily by David Miscavige to do anything and everything to "Stop Minton". Miscavige even blamed them for failure to stop Minton from moving to Clearwater in the first place. They brought in a number of private investigators and began a massive international campaign to silence Minton, to which funding was no barrier.

The main private investigator employed by the church was Dave Lubow, who flew all over the country contacting Minton's family, friends and associates, picketing Minton's other businesses, and even got his Swiss bank account frozen. They also arranged to goad Minton into swatting at a Scientologist by getting right up into his face and yelling at him; the swat of Minton's picket sign and the overdramatic 'fall' of the victim got him arrested. Although he was acquitted, Scientology thereafter called Minton a criminal who had been arrested for a violent assault.

In October 2009, Rinder and Rathbun told the St. Petersburg Times that Scientology eventually silenced Minton by digging into his financial details and secretly recording conversations. This included allegations about his Nigeria dealings in 2000. Rinder told the Times: "There were things that, really, he was worried about and had caused problems for him in the investigation that we had done" and that Minton and the church had reached a private settlement. Rinder, after leaving the church in 2007, described Minton as a friend in a 2009 interview.

== Minton switches sides ==
Minton changed his testimony in the McPherson case after a Scientology probe into his financial affairs. Minton was repeatedly ordered to attend depositions and questioned by Scientology lawyers about his alleged financial dealings. In addition, years later, former church officials detailed how they had investigated Minton, recording their conversations with him, obtaining his phone records and bank records, and finding information he was "worried about".

Critics of Scientology believe that Minton was blackmailed by the Church of Scientology. On March 16, 2002, Minton called Mike Rinder and on April 6 of that year they met. At that meeting Minton told Rinder that there were lies told in the case and he feared Scientology would uncover those lies in court and he would be sent to jail for perjury.

I don't want my life defined by Scientology anymore. I just want some peace.

— Bob Minton

During an April 20, 2002, hearing in the Lisa McPherson wrongful death lawsuit against the Church of Scientology, Minton spoke against Ken Dandar, the attorney representing McPherson's family. In a 26-page affidavit, Minton stated that Tampa attorney Ken Dandar asked him to lie, drew up false court records for him to sign and urged him to generate bad publicity for the Church of Scientology to prejudice potential jurors in the McPherson wrongful death case as Scientology tried to get the wrongful death case dismissed on grounds of serious misconduct by Ken Dandar and his client. Minton's affidavit gave new details about how involved Minton was in the wrongful death case from the start, stating that he gave Dandar more than $2 million to finance the case and paying witnesses to testify against the church. Dandar took the witness stand to explain the origin of Swiss bank checks totaling $750,000 that Minton allegedly gave him. Minton also testified about two financial arrangements in which $800,000 of his money was transferred from Europe to the Lisa McPherson Trust and that he had kept a portion of that money because he wanted to hide the source of the Trust's funding from the Church of Scientology.

Despite the allegations the presiding judge declined to remove attorney Dandar from the case, stating that she did not believe Minton's testimony, and that he had lied in an attempt to escape paying income taxes. Six months before she had already remarked that it was irrelevant how much money Minton had put into the case.

In August 2009, John Fashanu, who in 2000 accused Minton and Ibrahim Babangida of stealing money from Nigeria, apologized, saying, "I can say it again and again, that there was nothing like debt buy-back or any billions stacked away in any account anywhere." In 2000, Minton said that Fashanu was given false information by the Church of Scientology to attack him.

== Death ==
Minton died in Clonbur, Ireland of a heart ailment on January 20, 2010, at the age of 63. His funeral was held on the following Monday, at St. Mary of the Rosary Church, Cong, County Mayo, Ireland. He is buried in Lisloughrey Cemetery.
