= Robert Vaughn Young =

Critic of Scientology (1938–2003)

Robert Vaughn Young (April 23, 1938 – June 15, 2003) commonly known by his initials RVY, was an American whistleblower against the Church of Scientology after previously having worked as a top Scientology spokesman.

== In Scientology ==
Young had been a national spokesman for the Church of Scientology. Of his years with the organization, Young said:

I have held nearly every type of position at every echelon. I have worked at the local, the regional, the national and the international levels. I have been a Scientology representative and spokesman before governmental bodies, the media and the courts. I have trained others on how to handle the media and governmental agencies. I have been the most senior public relations executive for Scientology world wide. I worked for years at the echelon that handles critics, "enemies," the media, judges, the courts and the government. I have been privy to documents and tactics of the most secret nature, including illegalities committed by Scientology executives and the means of cover-up.

Young edited L. Ron Hubbard's ten-volume Mission Earth series. Young said that Hubbard had written the main text of the series, but that he had ghostwritten the introduction of each volume, as well as other writings in Hubbard's name.

In 1989, Young was removed from his job as head of worldwide public relations for the Church of Scientology and sent to the RPF — Rehabilitation Project Force — Scientology's manual labor re-education camp.

== After leaving ==
After leaving the Church of Scientology in 1989, Young became prominent as an expert in court cases regarding Scientology such as CSI v. Fishman and Geertz, BPI v. FACTNet, the Lisa McPherson civil trial, cited by the press, and as an Internet-based critic of the organization.

David Miscavige had sent Mike Rinder and Mike Sutter to Seattle to try to silence Vaughn Young and his then-wife Stacey by "making peace" with them. They had almost clinched a deal when Miscavige ordered them to change the terms. That derailed the negotiations and the couple continued to be a thorn in Scientology's side for many years. Other harassments by the Church came to the attention of Bob Minton, a wealthy financier who was interested in free speech on the internet. He took up the couple's cause and paid to relocate them to a house outside of Seattle. Through his contact with the Youngs, Minton learned more about Scientology and eventually founded the Lisa McPherson Trust with Stacey.

Young was diagnosed with prostate cancer on November 23, 1999, and turned his energies to Phoenix5, a non-profit organization that runs a website on the disease. He died on June 15, 2003.

== Books ==
- Young, Vaughn; Meldal-Johnsen, Trevor (1979). Interpol Connection: An Inquiry into the International Criminal Police Organization. Dial Press. ISBN 0803740891.
