= Church of Scientology Flag Service Organization =

Organization in Clearwater, Florida

Church of Scientology Flag Service Organization, Inc.
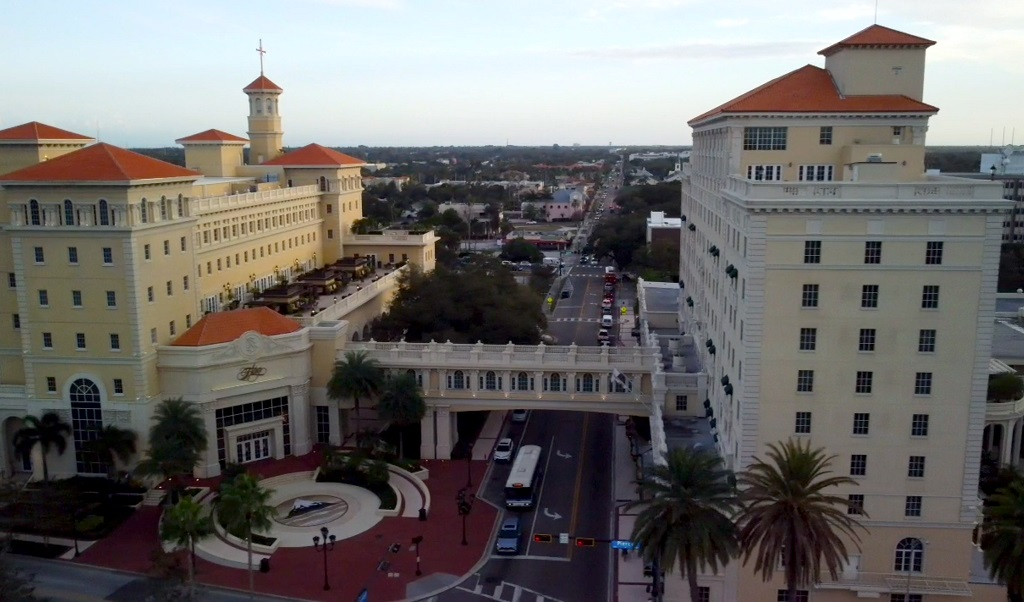
- Flag Building and Fort Harrison Hotel in Clearwater, Florida - operated by the Flag Service Organization
- Formation: 1981
- Type: Religious
- Location: Clearwater, Florida, United States
- President: Lena Lind
- Website: scientology-fso.org

The Church of Scientology Flag Service Organization, also known as Flag or FSO, is an American 501(c)(3) non-profit corporation. Within the worldwide network of Scientology corporations and entities, the FSO is officially referred to as the "spiritual headquarters" of the Church of Scientology. The organization is located in Clearwater, Florida.

According to the official website of the Church of Scientology, "the Flag Service Organization (FSO) is a religious retreat which serves as the spiritual headquarters for Scientologists from all over the world. It is the hub of the Scientology worldwide community, a dynamic, multilingual organization and is the largest single Church of Scientology in the world" and has well over 1,000 staff members Additionally, the FSO "delivers Dianetics and Scientology services from the very bottom of The Bridge to the top, as well as certain specialized auditing services only available here".

In a memorandum provided to the Internal Revenue Service, the Church of Scientology International explained the role and the functions of the FSO as follows:

'Flag' in CSFSO's name originates from the Flag Service Organization's earliest ecclesiastical beginnings in 1967 aboard the Flagship Apollo and the name was maintained as tradition when the land-based organization was established. CSFSO ministers the highest levels of auditor training through Class XII and auditing through New OT VII. It serves as the spiritual headquarters for Scientologists from all over the world who travel there to participate in religious services.

— Application for Recognition of Exemption Under Section 501(c)(3) of the Internal Revenue Code, 1993

In another 1993 memorandum by the Church of Scientology International, the following information was provided to the Internal Revenue Service with regards to FSO's personnel and its income:

"[...] CSFSO [...] ministers high levels of religious services to parishioners from around the world from facilities in Clearwater, Florida. This church has a staff of approximately 449 individuals and an annual budget of approximately $ 81.3 million, based on its annual disbursements for the most recent year for which financial statements are available. [...]"

== Corporate information ==
The FSO was incorporated in Florida on May 19, 1981. On September 21, 1993, the following individuals held corporate positions at the organization: The Board of Trustees was composed of Sue Price, Pam Hubbert and Richard Reiss. The members of the Board of Directors at that time were Catherine Probst, Allen Hubbert and Debbie Cook. The corporation's President was Alicia Danilovich, its Secretary and Treasurer Catherine Probst. As of April 28, 2009, FSO's corporative officers were Lena Lind (President), Harvey Jacques (Director), Peter Mansell (Director), Glen Stilo (Secretary) and Barbara Meador (Treasurer & Director). FSO's registered agent is currently Robert V. Potter.

On August 18, 1993, the FSO filed an application for tax exemption under section 501(c)(3) of the Internal Revenue Code. The Internal Revenue Service granted FSO's request for exemption through an official recognition letter on October 1, 1993.

The Religious Technology Center (RTC) holds the trademarks and service marks of Scientology. As such, RTC entered an organizational covenant with the FSO on January 1, 1982, granting FSO the right to sell and deliver the "Advanced Technology" to its public members while guaranteeing weekly payments to the RTC of 6% of the monetary value of the "Advanced Technology"-services delivered by the FSO.

The Church of Scientology International (CSI) presents itself as the mother church of the Church of Scientology worldwide. As such, it has the right to use and sub-license various Scientology trademarks and service marks. Consequently, CSI has entered a number of agreements with other subordinate organizations in the Scientology hierarchy, such as the FSO:

- "License Agreement". This agreement from May 26, 1982, regulates the use of the service marks and trademarks by the FSO.
- "Ecclesiastical Support Agreement". This agreement from January 1, 1992, acknowledges CSI's dominant role and control over all the functions and activities of the FSO and guarantees a steady, weekly payment of 12.5% of the organizations' net income towards CSI.
- "Motion Picture Exhibition Agreement". It guarantees CSI the weekly payment of 11% of the revenue by the FSO for their use of Scientology training courses. It also forces the organizations to use certain equipment, such as tape recorders, which CSI provides.

== Organizational structure and management ==
According to its 1993 application for tax exemption, the corporation "Church of Scientology Flag Service Organization, Inc." consisted at that time of the following four different sub-organizations or sub-entities:

"[...] 1. Flag Service Org. Flag Service Org ministers religious services to CSFSO's parishioners. This ecclesiastical body includes all of the auditors, case supervisors, course supervisors and other staff directly involved in ministering services, as well as executive and administrative staff that perform necessary support functions such as personnel, communications, ethics, treasury and finances, administration and dissemination. The highest ecclesiastical position in the Flag Service Org is its Captain, who, together with her deputies and other top executives form its executive council, the highest ecclesiastical body in the organization. Beneath the executive council is an advisory council, comprising the heads of each of the Flag Service Org's divisions. These two bodies, subject to ecclesiastical management advice and direction from senior ecclesiastical organizations [...], direct the day-to-day and week-to-week activities of the Flag Service Org."

"2. Flag Crew Org. The Flag Crew Org performs direct support functions for Flag Service Org and other ecclesiastical bodies within CSFSO. The Flag Crew Org maintains the buildings and property of CSFSO; maintains and operates the accommodations and food facilities of CSFSO's religious retreat; and berths, feeds and otherwise communally supports CSFSO's staff. The Flag Crew Org has its own captain, executive council and advisory council which direct its activities."

"3. Flag Land Base. Flag Land Base is an ecclesiastical body within CSFSO that is senior to both the Flag Service Org and Flag Crew Org. Flag Land Base is composed of a number of executive CSFSO staff personnel responsible for the overall direction and coordination of CSFSO as a whole. This body is headed by the Commanding Officer Flag Land Base, who is the highest ecclesiastical official in CSFSO's hierarchy. Whereas the Captains of the Flag Service Org and Flag Crew Org are primarily concerned with the activities of their respective ecclesiastical organizations, the Commanding Officer Flag Land Base and his staff consider CSFSO's activities as a whole."

"4. Commodore's Messenger Org Clearwater (CMO CW). CMO CW oversees and ensures the implementation of programs that CSFSO receives from the Commodore's Messenger Org International, an ecclesiastical body within CSI. These programs can relate to all facets of CSFSO's activities from the conduct of religious services to the acquisition and renovation of buildings, and unusual or ongoing legal or financial matters. [...]"

Corporate management

During the past years, CoSFSO Inc. was managed by the following corporate officers. The column "Year" of the following table refers to the date of the filing of the annual report for not-for-profit corporations with the Secretary of State for the State of Florida.

Year	President	Vice-president	Directors
2019	Lena (Lind) Pirak	-	Harvey Jacques, Christine Revell, Ben Shaw,
2018	Lena (Lind) Pirak	-	Harvey Jacques, Christine Revell, Ben Shaw,
2017	Lena (Lind) Pirak	-	Harvey Jacques, Christine Revell, Ben Shaw,
2016	Lena (Lind) Pirak	-	Harvey Jacques, Christine Revell, Ben Shaw,
2015	Lena (Lind) Pirak	-	Harvey Jacques, Christine Revell, Ben Shaw,
2014	Lena (Lind) Pirak	-	Harvey Jacques, Peter Mansell, Barbara Meador
2013	Lena (Lind) Pirak	-	Harvey Jacques, Peter Mansell, Barbara Meador
2012	Lena (Lind) Pirak	-	Harvey Jacques, Peter Mansell, Barbara Meador
2011	Lena (Lind) Pirak	-	Harvey Jacques, Peter Mansell, Barbara Meador
2010	Lena (Lind) Pirak	-	Harvey Jacques, Peter Mansell, Barbara Meador
2009	Lena (Lind) Pirak	-	Harvey Jacques, Peter Mansell, Barbara Meador
2008	Mary Shaw	-	D. Cook, Harvey Jacques, Peter Mansell, B. Meador, K. True
2007	Mary Shaw	-	Debbie Cook, Barbara Meador, Ben Shaw, Kathy True
2006	Mary Shaw	Mary Story	Debbie Cook, Barbara Meador, Ben Shaw
2005	Mary Voegeding	Mary Story	Debbie Cook, Barbara Meador, Ben Shaw
2004	Mary Voegeding	Mary Story	Debbie Cook, Barbara Meador, Ben Shaw
2003	Mary Voegeding	Mary Story	Debbie Cook, Barbara Meador, Ben Shaw
2002	Mary Voegeding	Mary Story, Tom DeVocht	Debbie Cook, Barbara Meador, Ben Shaw
2001	Mary Voegeding	Mary Story, Tom DeVocht	Debbie Cook, Barbara Meador, Ben Shaw
2000	Mary Voegeding	Mary Story	Debbie Cook, Barbara Meador, Ben Shaw
1999	Mary Voegeding	Brian Anderson	Debbie Cook, Barbara Meador, Ben Shaw
1998	Mary Voegeding	Brian Anderson	Brian Anderson, Debbie Cook, Barbara Meador, Ben Shaw
1997	Mary Voegeding	Brian Anderson	Brian Anderson, Debbie Cook, Barbara Meador, Ben Shaw
1996	Mary Voegeding	Brian Anderson	Brian Anderson, Debbie Cook, Barbara Meador
1995	Mary Voegeding	Brian Anderson	Brian Anderson, Debbie Cook, Barbara Meador, Mary Story
1993	Alicia Danilovich	-	Debbie Cook, Allen Hubbert, Catherine Probst

In 1993, Catherine Probst held both the position of Treasurer and Secretary. During the years 1995 and 1996 Barbara Meador and Marsha Lovering held the positions of Treasurer and Secretary. In 1997 Glen Stilo replaced Lovering as Secretary, while Meador continued as Treasurer. Since then, these two positions remained unchanged.

== Lisa McPherson controversy ==
Lisa McPherson (February 10, 1959 – December 5, 1995) was an American Scientologist who died in the care of the Church of Scientology in Clearwater, Florida. After a minor traffic accident where McPherson seemed unharmed, she removed her clothes in the street and paramedics transported her to a local hospital. In order to avoid psychiatric intervention, local Scientologists convinced her to leave the hospital and seek care at the nearby Church of Scientology Flag Service Organization (FSO). There she was held against her will for 17 days without any medical care, while her physical and mental condition rapidly deteriorated and she died. Following the report by the state medical examiner that indicated that McPherson was a victim of negligent homicide, FSO was indicted on two felony charges, "abuse and/or neglect of a disabled adult" and "practicing medicine without a license." The charges were dropped after the state's medical examiner changed the cause of death from "undetermined" to an "accident" on June 13, 2000. A civil suit brought by McPherson's family was settled on May 28, 2004.

== See also ==
- Church of Scientology § FSO
- List of Scientology organizations
