= Scientology and celebrities =

Church of Scientology recruiting

The Church of Scientology has recruited celebrities for their endorsement of Scientology as a public relations strategy. The organization has had a written program governing celebrity recruitment since at least 1955, when L. Ron Hubbard created "Project Celebrity", offering rewards to Scientologists who recruited targeted celebrities. Early interested parties included former silent-screen star Gloria Swanson and jazz pianist Dave Brubeck. The Scientology organization has a particular interest in international focus on wealthy businesspeople and influencers to help promote its ideals. A Scientology policy letter of 1976 states that "rehabilitation of celebrities who are just beyond or just approaching their prime" enables the "rapid dissemination" of Scientology.

== Hubbard's views on celebrities ==
The Church of Scientology has a long history of seeking out artists, musicians, writers and actors, and advertises that Scientology can help them in their lives and careers. According to religious historian Carole M. Cusack, "L. Ron Hubbard was fascinated by Hollywood, and actively pursued "stars" by promoting the Church of Scientology among the rich and famous. That celebrities joined the Church (Note: Use of "Church" or "the Church" is a common shortened form of "Church of Scientology"; see The Church (Scientology).) became a powerful draw card for Scientology, in that it rendered membership desirable." According to Mike Rinder, Hubbard frequently name-dropped, "claiming association and interaction especially with Hollywood figures", soon envisioning their role as helping him gain publicity and acceptance, ultimately making up a list of celebrities to target for recruitment. It was in 1955 when Hubbard started Project Celebrity in order to recruit people he considered "opinion leaders" in the fields of art, sports, management, and government. As Hubbard put it, "Celebrities are very Special people and have a very distinct line of dissemination. They have comm[unication] lines that others do not have and many medias [sic] to get their dissemination through".

== Celebrity Centres ==
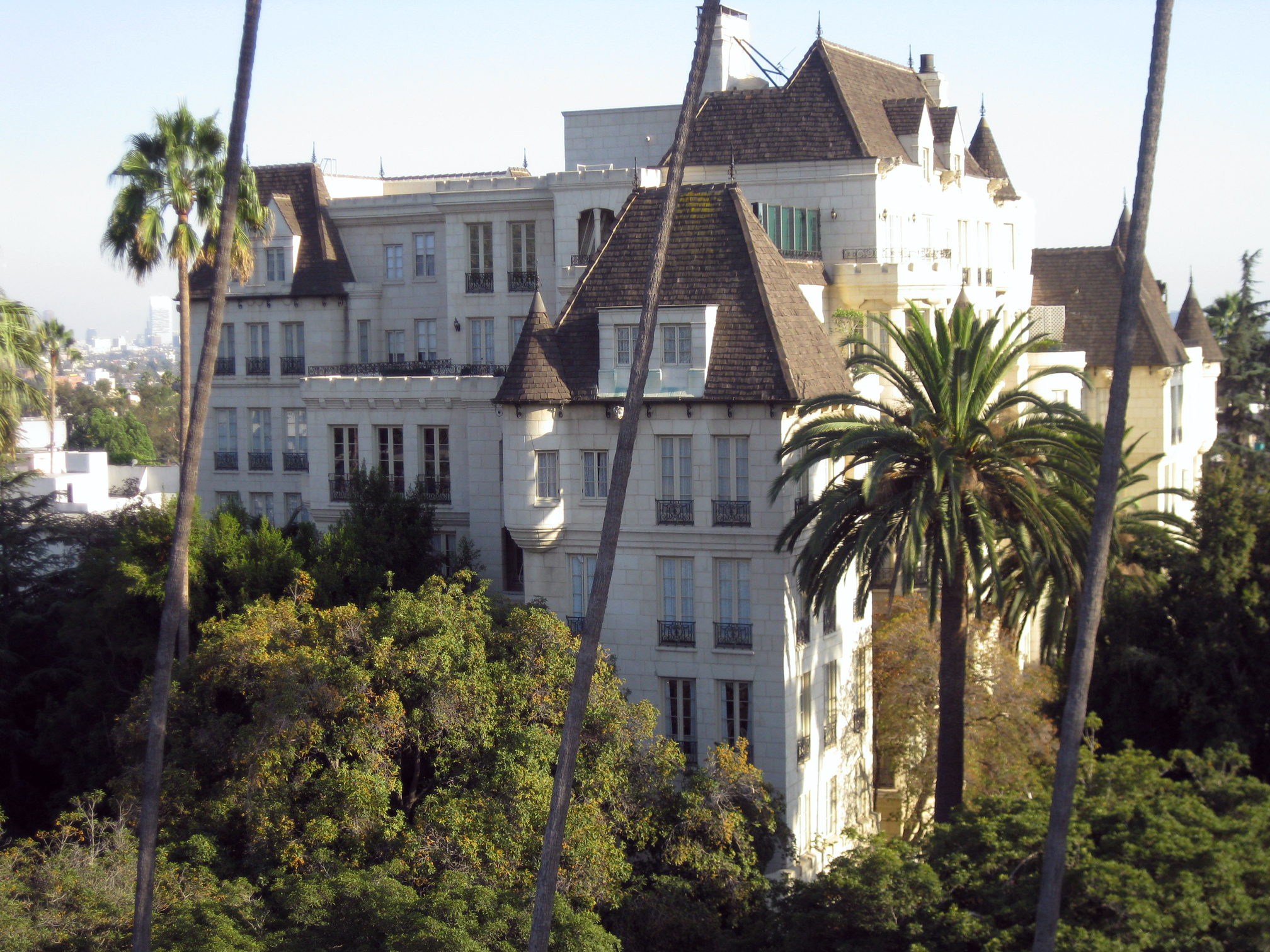
Celebrity Centre International in Hollywood

Certain Churches of Scientology have been designated as Celebrity Centres, particularly those in cities with a large entertainment industry that attracts artistic hopefuls, such as Hollywood, Nashville, New York City, and Paris. Celebrity Centre policies state that "one of the major purposes of the Celebrity Centre is to expand the number of celebrities in Scientology", with the goal of "broad public into Scientology from celebrity dissemination". Each Celebrity Centre has a division for planning celebrity events and directing general public onto Scientology services as a result of celebrity involvement.

== Recruiting celebrities ==
Scientology actively tries to recruit celebrities and aspiring actors in Hollywood. They have tried such tactics as standing outside the gates of Central Casting passing out flyers offering workshops in finding an agent and how to get ahead in the film industry, advertising in magazines such as Variety, Backstage and The Hollywood Reporter, and displaying posters of film stars saying "I am a Scientologist... come in and find out why". The approach is to promote Scientology as professional development.

Aspiring actors would often be referred to Milton Katselas for acting lessons. Katselas, a Scientologist who kept L. Ron Hubbard's photograph on his desk, ran his Beverly Hills Playhouse with strict Scientology principles, and the acting school was "an unofficial feeder" to Celebrity Centre in the 1990s and 2000s.

Professor of religious studies Hugh Urban spoke about Scientology's appeal to celebrities in an interview:

But then I think the reason that celebrities would be interested is because it's a religion that fits pretty well with a celebrity kind of personality. It's very individualistic. It celebrates your individual identity as ultimately divine. It claims to give you ultimate power over your own mind, self, destiny, so I think it fits well with an actor personality. And then the wealth question: These aren't people who need more wealth, but what they do need, or often want at least, is some kind of spiritual validation for their wealth and lifestyle, and Scientology is a religion that says it's OK to be wealthy, it's OK to be famous, in fact, that's a sign of your spiritual development. So it kind of is a spiritual validation for that kind of lifestyle.

Scientology isn't the only new religion to seek out celebrities to help promote their movement. Sociologists have posited that emulating celebrities is an important part of an individual's identity formation, explaining the significance of a group having celebrity members. Journalistic and media sources claim that Scientology is "The Church of the Stars" or a "star-studded sect," although there are likely more Hollywood celebrities in other religious traditions. One reason for this is the Celebrity Centres, which are unique to Scientology. Most members in these facilities are not celebrities, however many of the members are part of the entertainment industry.

== Expectation to proselytize ==
Celebrities are expected to proselytize. Before 2008, Tom Cruise had been one of the most outspoken. In 2003, Cruise's publicist wanted him to tone down his proselytizing because the movie studios wanted him to "sell movies, not Scientology". After firing his publicist and hiring his sister in the role, Cruise drew public criticism for behavior such as jumping on Oprah Winfrey's couch in 2005 and targeting Brooke Shields for taking certain medications. After the controversy, Cruise has not spoken about Scientology and has forbidden interviewers from asking him about it since 2008.

Scientology routinely gets their celebrity members to hold seminars and workshops for their peers, pointing out how Scientology had helped them achieve success in the industry, which was used to recruit new members for Scientology.

Celebrity members are constantly being pressed to add their names to petitions, being showcased at workshops and galas, or having their photos posted over the logo "I'm a Scientologist." Their fame greatly magnifies the influence of the church. They are deployed to advance the social agendas of the organization, including attacks on psychiatry and the pharmaceutical industry, and the promotion of Hubbard's contested theories of education and drug rehabilitation. They become tied to Scientology's banner, which makes it more difficult to break away if they should become disillusioned. — Lawrence Wright in Going Clear

== Special treatment ==
The most famous celebrities would get special treatment from Sea Org members, and might be assigned their own personal assistant to attend to them. In case it didn't work, the responsible Sea Org member would be punished, sometimes quite harshly.

== Notable celebrity members ==
=== Members ===
- Kirstie Alley, actress (deceased)
- Anne Archer, actress
- Catherine Bell, actress
- Nancy Cartwright, actress
- Chick Corea, musician (deceased)
- Erika Christensen, actress
- Tom Cruise, actor
- Jason Dohring, actor
- Jenna Elfman, actress
- Doug E. Fresh, music industry
- Isaac Hayes, singer/songwriter (deceased)
- Vivian Kubrick, film industry
- Alanna Masterson, actress
- Christopher Masterson, actor
- Danny Masterson, actor
- Elisabeth Moss, actress
- Michael Peña, actor
- Giovanni Ribisi, actor
- John Travolta, actor
- Greta Van Susteren, news anchor
- Grant Cardone, businessman/writer

=== Former members ===
The following celebrities have announced at some point that they were no longer members of the Church of Scientology or no longer practiced Scientology.

- Beck, musician/singer/songwriter
- Jason Beghe, actor
- Nazanin Boniadi, actress
- William S. Burroughs II, writer (deceased)
- Paul Haggis, filmmaking
- Katie Holmes, actress
- Nicole Kidman, actress
- Jason Lee, actor
- Juliette Lewis, actress
- Vince Offer, pitchman/independent film producer
- Laura Prepon, actress
- Lisa Marie Presley, singer/songwriter (deceased)
- Leah Remini, actress
- Mimi Rogers, actress
- John Stamos, actor
- Jeffrey Tambor, actor
- Robert Vaughn Young, writer (deceased)
