= Christine Eads =

Christine Eads is television and radio personality from the United States.

== Career ==
Eads hosted a daily talk and entertainment radio program, Broadminded, on XM Radio's Take 5 Channel. Then on SiriusXM Stars Channel 107 from October 2005 – March 2013. She launched The Mom Squad in January 2014 with Kyra Philips and Chaz Kelly, a daily podcast that comments on parenting and family issues.

Eads has worked in a number of jobs in television, radio, and stage, including commercials, voice-over work, and as a traffic reporter. She has also hosted the Washington DC show Hot on Homes seen on WUSA Channel 9. Prior to hosting Broadminded, Eads worked as a traffic reporter for XM Radio covering the Los Angeles and Detroit areas.

In 2001 she starred in the controversial film The Profit as Leland Conrad Powers' wife, Helen Hughes. The film premiered at the Cannes Film Festival and was banned from release by court order in 2002 due to legal action by the Church of Scientology.

Eads is also the founder of The Duffy House, a nonprofit organization which helps survivors of domestic and sexual violence.

== Personal life ==
Eads has one son.
