= International Foundation for Human Rights and Tolerance =

Scientology front group

- Formation: 1997
- Type: Human rights group affiliated with Scientology
- Legal status: Non-profit
- Headquarters: California, United States
- Website: humanrightsandtolerance.org

The International Foundation for Human Rights and Tolerance is a Scientology front group, the stated aim of which is to "provide easy-to-understand human rights education to adults and children so that they are able to grasp what fundamental human rights are as aligned with the United Nations Universal Declaration of Human Rights." The group's secondary objective is to "effectively combat violations of human rights, focusing on the issues of children and religious freedom."

The foundation, established in 1997 as the Foundation for Religious Tolerance at 1332 L. Ron Hubbard Way in Los Angeles, California, changed its name in 2002 and moved to 4845 Fountain Ave in 2003.

== Florida ==
The Foundation for Religious Tolerance of Florida was a relatively short-lived Scientology organization founded by Mary DeMoss, which, in 2000, protested against the production of the anti-Scientology film, The Profit.

== See also ==
- Youth for Human Rights International
