= Lisa McPherson Trust =

Organization to help victims of Scientology

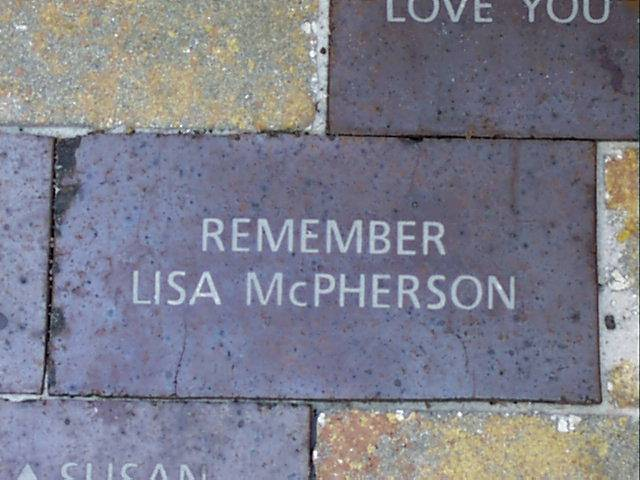
- A commemorative brick laid by the trust
- Formation: 1999
- Founder: Bob Minton
- Type: Educational
- Legal status: For-profit
- Purpose: Scientology controversies
- Headquarters: Clearwater, Florida, United States

The Lisa McPherson Trust was an organisation created in 1999 by Bob Minton. The trust was named after Lisa McPherson, a Scientology member who died in 1995 after being in the Church of Scientology’s care for 17 days. Their stated goal was to "expose the deceptive and abusive practices of Scientology and help those victimized by [the Church of Scientology]."

Of the five staff members at the Lisa McPherson trust, four were former members of Scientology.

== History ==
Bob Minton learned of the Church of Scientology's attempt to shut down the Internet newsgroup alt.religion.scientology. Minton was an advocate of free speech on the Internet and a member of the Electronic Frontier Foundation, and was alarmed at the Church's strong-arm tactics against its opponents, including raiding their homes and confiscating computer equipment over alleged copyright infringement for publishing documents on the Internet.

== Staff ==
The LMT staff included Stacy Brooks (President), Jesse Prince (Vice-President), Teresa Summers (Vice-President), Mark Bunker (Videographer), Jeff Jacobsen (Librarian), Robert Peterson (Office Manager), and Ingrid Wagner (Reception).

== Controversy ==
=== Location ===
Bob Minton discusses the difficulties of getting an office space in Clearwater

The company's headquarters were located in downtown Clearwater, Florida. Many property managers denied the group access to their buildings after being contacted by members of Scientology. Eventually, the group purchased a building at 33 N Fort Harrison Ave, which was situated 30 feet (9 meters) from Scientology buildings. Scientology offered to buy the building out from Minton but the property manager declined.

=== Picketing ===
The company frequently engaged in pickets in downtown Clearwater. On the anniversary of Lisa McPherson’s death in 1999, the group used a projector to beam a message on the side of the Fort Harrison Hotel which read: "Lisa McPherson: We will never forget you." An injunction was quickly sought against the group and a no-picket zone was established in front of Scientology buildings. Church members and trust members were also ordered to keep 10 feet (3 meters) away from each other at all times.

In 2001 this injunction was expanded by a county judge. The new order prevented either side from yelling, shouting, whistling, singing, blowing a horn whistle or other noisemaker, or otherwise creating noise which would disturb "reasonable persons of ordinary sensibilities." It also expanded the no-picket zone to include the area across the street from Scientology's dining hall.

The new order also required trust members to inform the police of any picket an hour in advance of the event.

To enforce this ruling, Clearwater city painted two white lines across Watterson Avenue, stating that while Scientologists were loading or unloading buses in the area, the trust staff and members could not enter it.

=== Legal problems ===
In late 2001, Scientology named the Lisa McPherson Trust as co-defendants in a case they had brought against the estate of Lisa McPherson.

=== For-profit status ===
Bob Minton claimed that the trust had a for-profit status to allow them to hide financial and other records from the Church of Scientology. Scientologists claimed that the for-profit status was proof that the group was created in order to allow Minton to recuperate the almost $2.5 million that he had put towards creating the group.

== Reaction from the Church of Scientology ==
The Church vehemently opposed the creation of the trust. They levelled many accusations against it including allegations that the trust was violently attempting to deprogram ex-Scientologists. Scientology hired off-duty police officers, who were paid close to $150,000 over the course of 15 months, to ensure that trust members stayed 10 feet (3 meters) away from Scientology buildings and parishioners at all times.

== Bennetta Slaughter ==
In 1995, Slaughter, an influential Scientologist, was caught up in controversy surrounding the death of an employee and friend, Lisa McPherson, in Clearwater, Florida.

McPherson was a long-time Scientologist who moved in 1994 from Dallas to Clearwater with her employer, AMC Publishing. The company is operated and staffed largely by Scientologists who want to be close to the Church of Scientology's spiritual headquarters in downtown Clearwater. Bennetta Slaughter was her supervisor and friend for 12 years. In 1995 Lisa McPherson died of a pulmonary embolism, weeks after leaving the hospital against medical advice with a group of Scientologists, while under the care of the Flag Service Organization (FSO), a branch of the Church of Scientology. Following her death the Church of Scientology was indicted on two felony charges "abuse and/or neglect of a disabled adult and practicing medicine without a license", putting under trial the nature of Scientology beliefs and practices. According to Slaughter's own court testimony, McPherson officially listed Slaughter as "next of kin" on her medical record, and Slaughter was the only person Lisa identified to be contacted in case of an emergency.

Of Lisa's death, Slaughter was quoted as saying: "I think she got sick and she died. There's nothing else there." She later took an active role in defending Scientology from the wrongful death lawsuit for the death of Lisa McPherson, and she explained her role as such: "I will, in fact, counter any hate that will come from them and I will handle that" Slaughter also tried to counter the efforts of prominent Scientology critic Bob Minton to set up a foundation to help Scientology victims. After Minton announced plans to name his group after Lisa McPherson, Slaughter quickly registered and became the head of the Lisa McPherson Foundation (with 300 members according to Slaughter), the Lisa Foundation, the Friends of Lisa McPherson Foundation, and the Lisa McPherson Educational Foundation. All these organisations were dissolved in September 2003 for failing to file the annual report. Her actions were against the wishes of Lisa's family, who supported Minton's organization, the Lisa McPherson Trust. In December 1997, Bennetta Slaughter and AMC Publishing were added as additional defendants in the wrongful death lawsuit. Charges in the criminal case were dropped on June 13, 2000, when the state's medical examiner changed the cause of death from "undetermined" to an "accident". A civil suit brought by McPherson's family against the Church was settled on May 28, 2004.

== Closure of the trust ==
The trust was disbanded in November 2001. Minton cited mounting legal pressure from Scientology as the official reason. The closure of the trust was delayed for some months as a judge ordered that Scientology could conduct an official review of all of the Trust’s records. This included phone records and financial records which were later produced in court.

In 2006, Bob Minton signed over the ownership of the building at 33 N Ft. Harrison Ave, Clearwater to the Church of Scientology.

== See also ==
- Death of Lisa McPherson
