= Shari Elliker =

American voice actress and radio host

- Occupations: Voice actress and radio host
- Known for: Work on a number of radio stations, primarily in the Washington, D.C. and Baltimore metropolitan areas

Shari Elliker is an American voice actress and radio host who has worked on a number of radio stations, primarily in the Washington, D.C., and Baltimore metropolitan areas.

== Biography ==
=== Career ===
Elliker hosted her own morning radio show on WBAL in Baltimore from 9:00 a.m. to 12:00 p.m. starting in 2007, but later moved to afternoons once the station went to a news format in the afternoons and moved their veteran talk show host Ron Smith to mornings. Elliker then hosted "The Afternoon News Journal with Shari Elliker" through August 2011, when WBAL chose not to renew her contract.

She is the recipient of the "Outstanding Talk Show" awards from the Associated Press, Chesapeake Region for 2007 and 2008 and has received two "Achievement in Radio" Awards.

Prior to WBAL, Elliker's work history included hosting the Broadminded radio program on XM Radio through December 21, 2007, hosting her own morning show for a number of years on WHFS, 99.1 FM in Washington, D.C., and Baltimore, working from 1992–1996 on The Don and Mike Show, doing traffic and sitting in the "fourth chair", and at WUSA as the on camera afternoon traffic reporter. In May 2024 she was laid off as co-host of the John Curley and Shari Elliker Show on KIRO-FM in Seattle every afternoon from 3–6 p.m. PST, due to budget cuts. Shari had a recurring role on the HBO series Veep as anchorwoman Andrea Tandy.

In voice acting, she voiced multiple characters in the 2008 video game Fallout 3.

=== Personal life ===
Elliker is married.

== Film ==
- Sally Pacholok (2015) – Anchorwoman

=== Television ===
- Veep (2014–2015) – Andrea Tandy (three episodes)
- Homicide: Life on the Street (1997) – Woman on the Street ("Subway")

=== Video games ===
- The Elder Scrolls III: Morrowind (2002) – Azura / Female Imperials (voice)
- The Elder Scrolls III: Tribunal (2002) – Azura / Laurina Maria / Female Imperials (voice)
- The Elder Scrolls III: Bloodmoon (2003) – Gaea Artoria / Female Imperials (voice)
- Star Trek: Legacy (2006) – Vorel / Romulan / TNG Captain (voice)
- Star Trek: Conquest (2007) – Federation Computer Voice / Romulan Admiral #2 (voice)
- Fallout 3 (2008) – Beatrice Armstrong / Reilly / Star Paladin Cross (voice)
- Fallout 3: Broken Steel (2009) – Officer Lorin / Rosa Meitner / Project Purity Scientist (voice)
