= Introspection Rundown =

Scientology procedure of detention for psychosis

The Introspection Rundown is a controversial Church of Scientology auditing process that is intended to handle a psychotic episode or complete mental breakdown. Introspection is defined for the purpose of this rundown as a condition where the person is "looking into one's own mind, feelings, reactions, etc." The result is "the person extroverted, no longer looking inward worriedly continuously without end."

The Introspection Rundown came under public scrutiny after the death of Lisa McPherson in 1995. The rundown was created by L. Ron Hubbard, founder of Scientology, and released 24 January 1974.

== Overview ==
In Scientology, a rundown is a procedure set out as a series of steps to produce a particular result or phenomenon. Hubbard outlined the Introspection Rundown in three technical bulletins.

The first step of the Introspection Rundown is to "isolate the person wholly with all attendants completely muzzled (no speech)." Auditing sessions are given frequently. Otherwise, the person is not spoken to.

To determine the end of isolation, the supervisor in charge of the person being isolated tests the person's condition by writing a note, such as "Dear Joe. What can you guarantee me if you are let out of isolation?" If Joe's answer shows continued irresponsibility, the supervisor must write back something like, "Dear Joe. I'm sorry but it is no go on coming out of isolation yet," including the reasons why not. When it is obvious the person is out of his psychosis and up to the responsibility of living with others, his isolation is ended.

To administer this rundown, a Scientologist requires an education in Scientology beliefs and practices (which the Church dubbed "technologies"). This education includes all of the technical bulletins (17 large volumes), the many Scientology books, and hundreds of hours of recorded lectures, all of which must be demonstrated as proficiency in them.

The technical bulletin goes on: "This Rundown is very simple but cannot be flubbed, as that will compound the errors and cause further introspection in the pc". It "is very precise and even touchy business. There must be no mistakes and you cannot be heavy-handed on them."

Hubbard declared about the Introspection Rundown: "This means the last reason to have psychiatry around is gone" because "I have made a technical breakthrough which possibly ranks with the major discoveries of the Twentieth Century."

== Lisa McPherson controversy ==
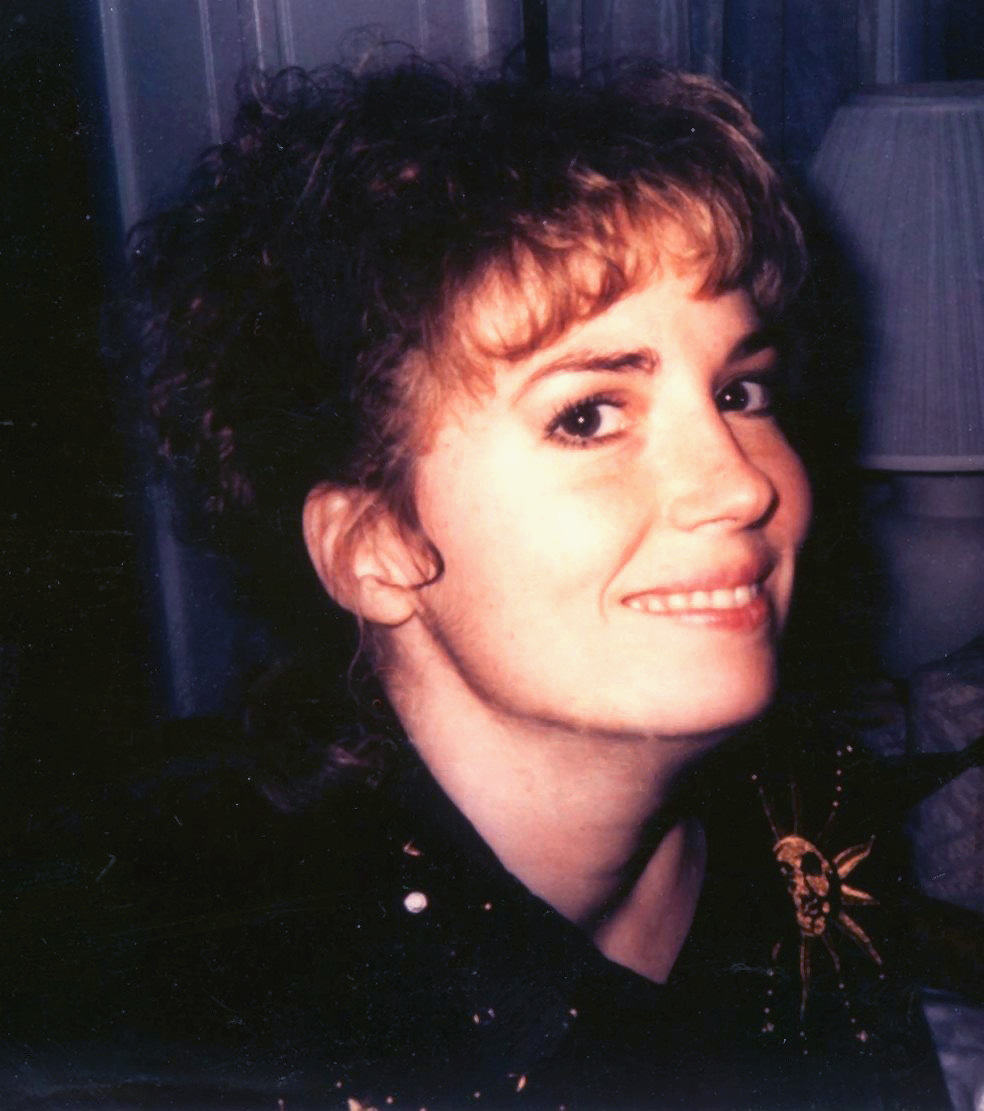
Lisa McPherson

Scientology adherent Lisa McPherson had a car accident in Clearwater, Florida, on 18 November 1995 while studying at Scientology headquarters. She disrobed by the side of the road in front of the paramedics, who were there for a routine traffic accident report. She was taken to a hospital for a psychiatric evaluation, but some Scientologists arrived and stated that McPherson did not believe in psychiatry. She checked out after a short evaluation and left with the Scientologists.

McPherson was put on the Introspection Rundown after her accident on 18 November. It was her second time on the rundown, her first time having been in June. Her appearance after death was that of someone who had been denied water and food for quite some time, being both underweight and severely dehydrated. Additionally, her skin was covered with over a hundred insect bites, presumably from cockroaches. She was locked in a room for 17 days. The Church has repeatedly denied any wrongdoing and now makes members sign a waiver before the Introspection Rundown stating that they (or anyone on their behalf) will not bring any legal action against the organization over injury or death.

== See also ==
- Scientology controversies
- Scientology in the United States
