= Celebrity Centre =

Scientology church branch for celebrities, politicians, artists & leaders

Church of Scientology Celebrity Centre

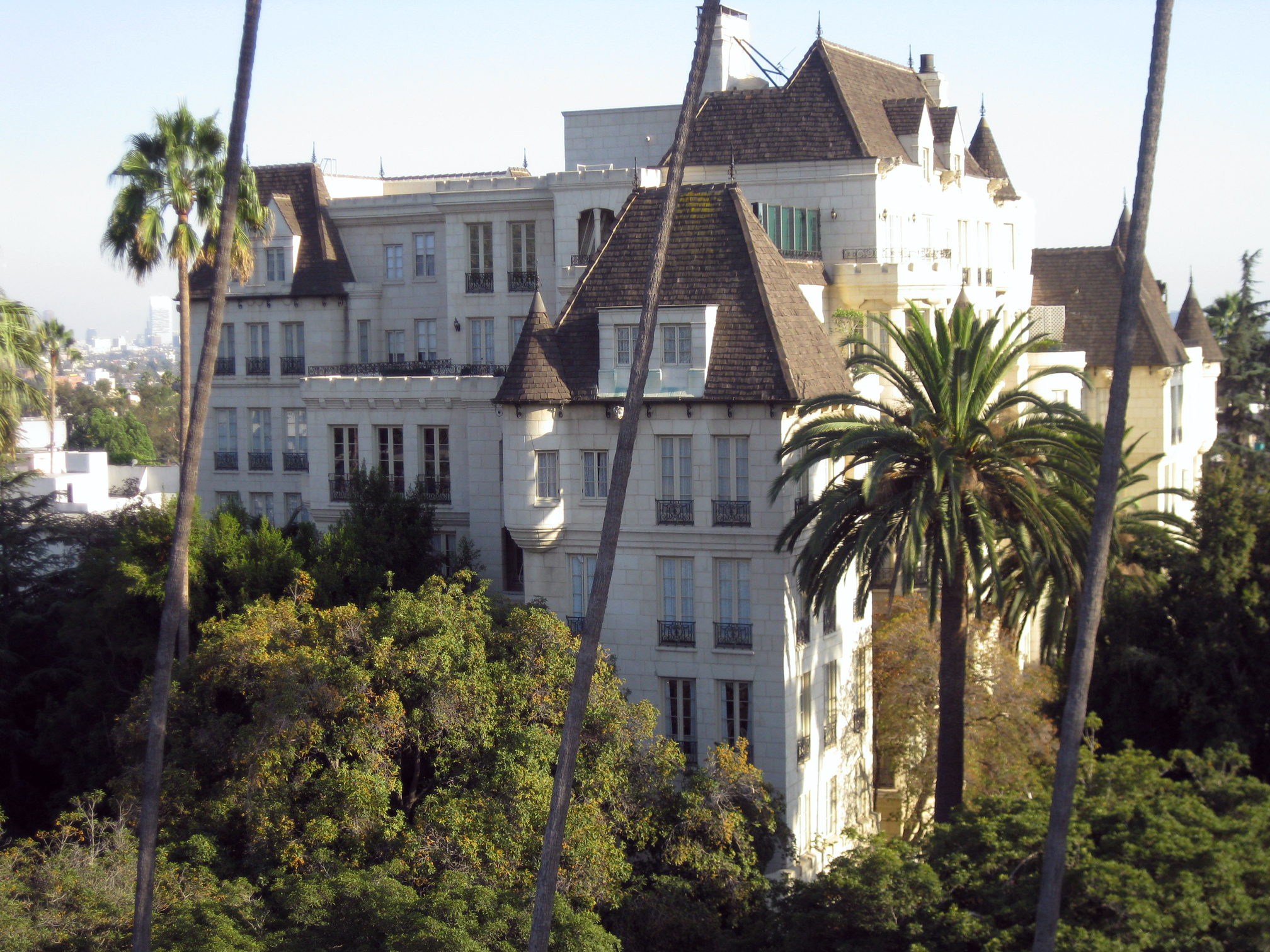
- Celebrity Centre International in Hollywood, California
- Formation: 1969
- Headquarters: 5930 Franklin Ave, Los Angeles, California, United States
- Owner: Church of Scientology
- Commanding Officer: Dave Petit
- Website: scientology.cc

Church of Scientology Celebrity Centres are Churches of Scientology that are open to the general public but are intended for "artists, politicians, leaders of industry, and sports figures".

== Overview ==
The Celebrity Centre was first established in 1969 by Yvonne Gillham and Heber Jentzsch in the Château Élysée, a 1920s building that had been built to replicate a 17th century French-Normandy chateau, and which the Church of Scientology purchased in 1973. Other Celebrity Centre organizations have since been established around the USA and in Europe. As of 2024, there are eight Celebrity Centres open: Los Angeles, Las Vegas, Nashville and New York in the USA, and Vienna, Düsseldorf, Florence, and Paris in Europe.

Critics of Scientology point to L. Ron Hubbard's launch of "Project Celebrity" in 1955 to recruit celebrities into the church, and that the centres were established as an extension of this initial purpose.

"A culture is only as great as its dreams, and its dreams are dreamed by artists."
— L. Ron Hubbard

Though the Church of Scientology denies the existence of a policy to recruit high-ranking celebrities, The New York Times reported, "internal church documents show that their primary purpose is to recruit celebrities and use the celebrities' prestige to help expand Scientology," and the Los Angeles Times wrote, "The Church of Scientology uses celebrity spokesmen to endorse L. Ron Hubbard's teachings and give Scientology greater acceptability in mainstream America." Mike Argue of the band Chester said, "We made a lot of money for the church", referring to the original Celebrity Centre in Los Angeles which attracted "a boatload of notables" in the 1970s.

== Violent incident ==
On November 23, 2008, Mario Majorski arrived at the Los Angeles Celebrity Centre wielding dual samurai swords and threatening to injure people. Majorski was shot by Celebrity Centre security guards, and was later pronounced dead at Los Angeles County-USC Medical Center. Police regard the guards' actions as justifiable. Majorski was a Scientologist in the early 1990s; however, he left the group fifteen years prior to the incident, according to church spokesperson Tommy Davis. When he was still a member of the church, Majorski had filed lawsuits, later dismissed, against Louis West, a psychiatrist who was critical of Scientology.

== See also ==
- Scientology and celebrities
- Château Élysée
