= Broadminded (radio program) =

Broadminded was a daily talk and entertainment show in the United States. The show broadcast on Sirius XM Satellite Radio Channel 107 – Sirius XM Stars, hosted by Christine Eads and Molly Dedham, friends who met at George Mason University in the early 1990s. The pair referred to themselves as "Broads", and discussed a range of topics including sex, men, entertainment, and everyday life.

== History ==
The show debuted on XM Radio channel 105 TAKE 5 in October 2005. It was originally broadcast from 8pm to 10pm eastern time, but was moved to the evening drive time slot, from 5pm to 8pm Eastern time. In September 2007, the show was moved to the 12pm–3pm EST slot, with encore re-broadcasts at 9pm EST.

The original Broadminded show was presented by Dedham, Eads, and Shari Elliker. Elliker left the show on December 21, 2007. Jason Moore of Panacea was the Board Operator and occasional contributor.

After the merger between Sirius and XM satellite radio companies, Broadminded went on hiatus for six weeks from the beginning of 2009, returning on March 17, 2009, to Sirius 102 and XM 155 The Stars channels, broadcasting Monday-Friday at 12pm–2pm EST, with replays from 8pm–10pm EST.

From November 3, 2009, Broadminded aired live from 2pm–4pm EST, with replays 10pm–12am EST. From January 3, 2011, it switched to the morning drive time slot, 8am–10am EST.

In March 2013, the show was cancelled.
