= Death of Lisa McPherson =

Medical case

Lisa McPherson
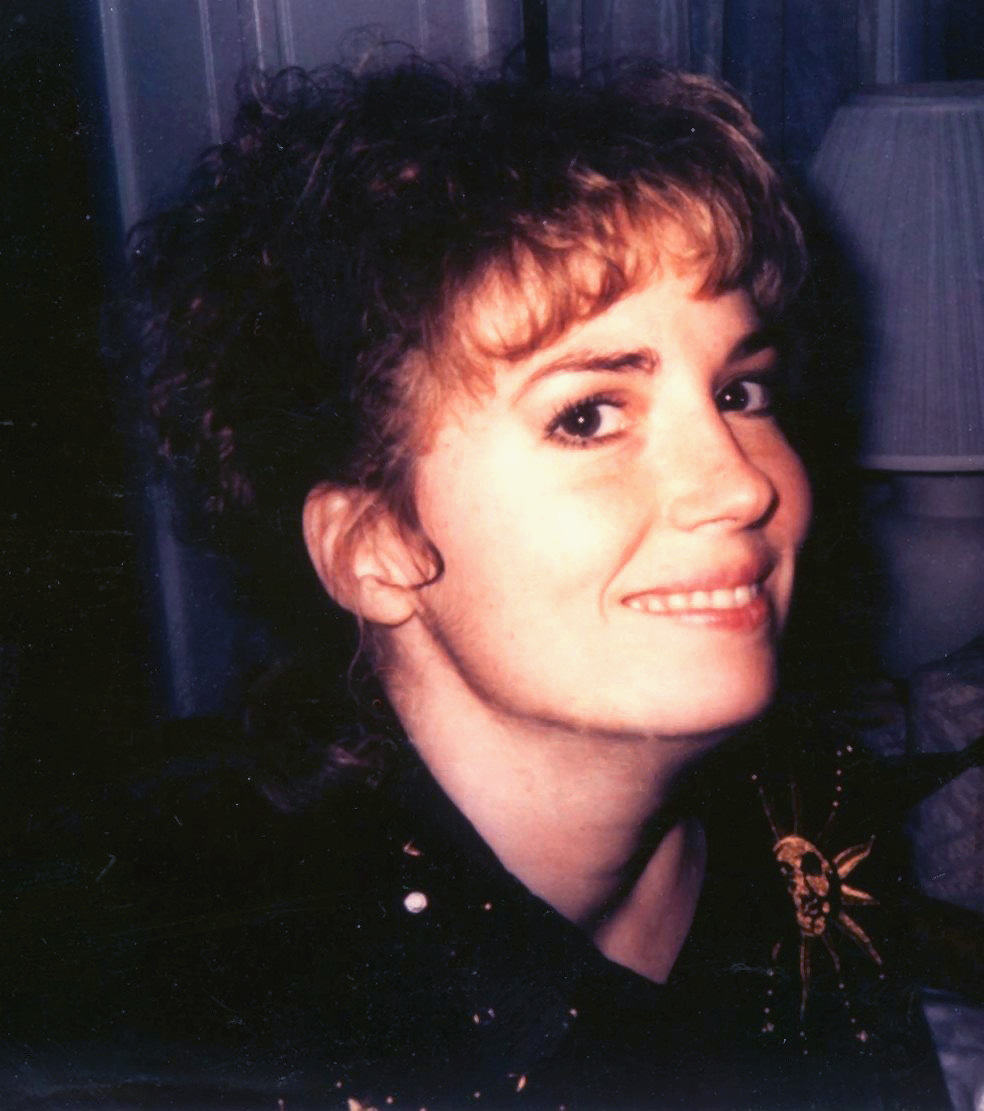
- Born: February 10, 1959; Dallas, Texas
- Died: December 5, 1995 (aged 36); Clearwater, Florida
- Cause of death: Pulmonary embolism; Negligent homicide

Lisa McPherson (February 10, 1959 – December 5, 1995) was an American Scientologist who died in the care of the Church of Scientology in Clearwater, Florida. After a minor traffic accident where McPherson seemed unharmed, she removed her clothes in the street and paramedics transported her to a local hospital. In order to avoid psychiatric intervention, local Scientologists convinced her to leave the hospital and seek care at the nearby Church of Scientology Flag Service Organization (FSO). There she was held against her will for 17 days without any medical care, while her physical and mental condition rapidly deteriorated and she died. Following the report by the state medical examiner that indicated that McPherson was a victim of negligent homicide, FSO was indicted on two felony charges, "abuse and/or neglect of a disabled adult" and "practicing medicine without a license." The charges were dropped after the state's medical examiner changed the cause of death from "undetermined" to an "accident" on June 13, 2000. A civil suit brought by McPherson's family was settled on May 28, 2004.

== Background ==
In 1994, Lisa McPherson, who became a Scientology adherent at age 18, moved from Dallas, Texas, to Clearwater, Florida, with her employer, AMC Publishing, which was at that time owned by Bennetta Slaughter and operated and staffed primarily by Scientologists. During June 1995, the Church of Scientology placed McPherson in an "Introspection Rundown" due to perceived mental instability. McPherson completed the process, and she attested to the state of "Clear" in September.

On November 18, 1995, McPherson was involved in a minor car accident. Paramedics initially left her alone because she was ambulatory, but after she began to remove her clothes, the paramedics decided to take her to the hospital. McPherson remarked to the paramedics that she had taken off her clothes in hopes of obtaining counseling. Hospital staff agreed that she was unharmed, but recommended keeping her overnight for observation. Following intervention by fellow Scientologists, McPherson refused psychiatric observation or admission at the hospital and checked herself out after a short evaluation. Pinellas-Pasco Circuit Judge Frank Quesada later stated that "Lisa McPherson refused psychiatric observation or admission at the hospital; she expressly stated her desire to receive the religious care and assistance from her fellow congregants that she and they wanted her to have."

McPherson was then taken to the Fort Harrison Hotel, also known as the Flag Land Base, where she was put under the care of staffers belonging to the Church's Flag Service Organization (FSO). According to Scientology, McPherson was brought to the Fort Harrison Hotel for "rest and relaxation". However, sworn statements demonstrate that she was brought there for another Introspection Rundown. Mark McGarry, an attorney with the Florida Office of the State Attorney, characterized McPherson's care under the FSO as an "isolation watch":

My understanding now is, from talking to many, many witnesses, the purpose of her being there in the Church, correct me if I'm wrong, she was experiencing some mental problems, and you guys were going to stabilize her through an isolation watch. And after that watch occurred, there was going to be a procedure run on her, and the procedure was an introspection rundown. —Mark McGarry

Scientology accommodated McPherson in a cabana and kept a "24 hours' watch" over her. Detailed logs were kept on her day-to-day care. These logs were handwritten on plain white paper. Most of these logs were kept, but the logs for the last three days were summarized from the originals and the originals were shredded. Brian J. Anderson, the then Commanding Officer of the Church's Office of Special Affairs (OSA) in Clearwater, said in his sworn statement:

I saw the handwritten notes, gave a cursory look to see if the summary—see if they matched and matched, and I threw the handwritten reports in my shred basket, and I had the report, kept the report.

McPherson's "care logs" narrate the last seventeen days of her life: she was incoherent and sometimes violent, her nails were cut so she would not scratch herself or the staff, and she bruised her fists and feet while hitting the wall. McPherson was given natural supplements and the drug chloral hydrate to help her sleep. A Church staffer noted that she "looked ill like measles or chicken pox on her face." On repeated occasions, McPherson refused food and protein shakes that the staff offered. On November 26 and 30 and December 3 to 4, Church staff attempted to force feed her, noting that she spat the food out. McPherson was noted to be very weak, not standing up nor on some days moving at all. Scientologists who questioned this handling were told to "butt out".

On December 5, 1995, Church staffers contacted David Minkoff, a Scientologist medical doctor who twice prescribed McPherson Valium and chloral hydrate without examining her. They requested for him to prescribe an antibiotic to McPherson because she seemed to have an infection. Minkoff refused, stating that she should be taken to a hospital and he needed to see her before prescribing anything. They objected, expressing fear that McPherson would be put under psychiatric care. Dr. Janice Johnson, a senior medical officer at the Fort Harrison Hotel who was assigned to care for McPherson, stated that she had been gasping and had labored breathing while en route. However, they passed a total of four hospitals along the way to their ultimate destination.

When they arrived at Minkoff's hospital forty-five minutes north of Clearwater, McPherson exhibited no vital signs. Hospital staff attempted to resuscitate her for twenty minutes before declaring her dead.

Scientologists called McPherson's family to say that she had died of meningitis or a blood clot while at the Fort Harrison Hotel for "rest and relaxation". A suspicious death investigation began the next day and an autopsy was performed. One year later, in response to a Clearwater Police Department website request for information on her death, Clearwater media began speculating about the causes of McPherson's death. Regular pickets have taken place outside Scientology offices on or around the anniversary of her death in the years since.

At the time of McPherson's death, Mike Rinder was a Sea Org member and an official with the church's Office of Special Affairs. He left the church in 2007 and later claimed that church leader David Miscavige personally supervised McPherson's case before her death, quoting Miscavige's sister-in-law as stating that "he was the one who ordered she be declared Clear before she had her psychotic episode." Rinder wrote that, during the legal proceedings that followed, Miscavige targeted Sea Org members who knew of his involvement with McPherson's case, reassigning them to geographically-isolated posts, in order to keep them from testifying or responding to subpoenas.

== Coroner's report and review ==
=== First coroner's report ===
On December 5, 1995, McPherson's autopsy was conducted by assistant medical examiner Robert Davis. Davis never completed McPherson's autopsy report because he was asked to resign from his position. The report identified McPherson's cause of death as a thromboembolism of the left pulmonary artery caused by "bed rest and severe dehydration", ruling the manner of death as "undetermined". The report also identified multiple bruises, an abrasion on the nose, lesions and insect bites that appeared consistent with that of a cockroach. The autopsy report was completed by Davis’s supervisor, medical examiner Joan Wood.

On January 21, 1997, Wood appeared on the news program Inside Edition and stated that the autopsy showed McPherson's condition had deteriorated slowly, going without fluids for five to ten days, was underweight, had cockroach bites and was comatose from 24 to 48 hours before she died. Scientology's legal team proceeded to sue Wood to gain access to her files; including tissue, organ and blood samples from McPherson's body. The lawsuit argued that Wood waived any right to keep her records on the case closed when she spoke openly about the case with news reporters. Scientology alleged that the records were needed to start their legal defense. These records were previously denied to the Church because they were part of an ongoing criminal investigation.

=== Independent opinion ===
The St. Petersburg Times contacted five medical experts for their opinions about the report, and they confirmed Wood's opinion. Scientology responded that the five doctors should have been given the entire autopsy report, not just the vitreous fluid tests, which pathologists use to determine the composition of blood at the time before death.

=== Scientology hired forensic pathologists ===
Scientology hired its own team to oppose Wood's findings, including two nationally known forensic pathologists: Dr. Michael Baden, a former chief medical examiner for New York City; and Dr. Cyril Wecht, a county coroner from Pittsburgh, Pennsylvania. Baden and Wecht concluded that McPherson died suddenly and unpredictably of a blood clot in her left lung that originated from a knee bruise she suffered in the minor car accident seventeen days earlier.

This scientific evidence was then sent to Wood for review. The scientific evidence sent to Wood included:

- Research on compounds known as ketones, which people produce when they are dehydrated, starving or even fasting. Tests of McPherson's bodily fluids showed no ketones according to the pathologists.
- Findings from a body measurement expert hired by the church. The Church-hired expert compared autopsy photos of McPherson with those taken shortly before the accident. The expert concluded from the photographs there was "no appreciable weight loss", countering the prosecution's view that McPherson lost 20 pounds (9.1 kg) to 40 pounds (18 kg) while in Scientology's care.
- A report by a Morton Plant Hospital doctor and Church officials who saw McPherson just before she entered the Fort Harrison Hotel, stating McPherson was already thin with protruding cheek bones.
- A report by Robert D. Davis, the pathologist who conducted the autopsy for Wood's office, concluded McPherson's body was of average nutritional status.
- Medical literature and sworn testimony gathered by the church that it says proves the eye fluid samples were improperly handled by Wood's office, incompetently tested at an independent lab and ultimately contaminated.

The plaintiff's response was that the chain of custody of evidence was not broken (also corroborated by assistant State Attorney Douglas Crow's memo to State Attorney Bernie McCabe).

Due to the vitreous fluid tests, Baden and Wecht maintained that McPherson was dehydrated. Chemical pathologists Calvin Bandt and Werner Spitz concurred with the initial coroner's report in their affidavits. Plaintiff witness Dr. Alan Wu also testified that ketones need not be present for dehydration in a special case like McPherson where she was fed proteins and therefore didn't create measurable ketones. The plaintiffs maintained that McPherson did lose water weight to result in 108 pounds (49 kg) with respect to the vitreous fluid.

=== Final coroner's report ===
In light of the new scientific evidence provided by Scientology, a review was mandated. The policy stated that the medical examiner will "readdress key issues" in a case if "credible new evidence is presented, regardless of its source." After the review, Wood changed the cause of death from "undetermined" to an "accident." Wood stated that McPherson's psychosis and auto accident were major factors to the development of the fatal pulmonary embolism.

== Criminal case review ==
Wood's revised report caused the review and subsequent dismissal of the criminal case concerning McPherson's death. The review was done by assistant State Attorney Douglas Crow and was outlined in the 31-page memo that he sent to State Attorney Bernie McCabe, with a recommendation to drop the criminal case against Scientology.

=== The initial autopsy ===
Crow stated that there were credibility issues with the original autopsy, including that Wood signed the autopsy herself, five months after Davis's departure, she failed to examine tissue samples and did not consult clinical experts before reaching her conclusion. He also pointed out two other mistakes made by Wood, such as, she released the autopsy report on an active-criminal case and went public on national media.

=== Robert Davis's testimony ===
Davis changed his testimony from a 1997 deposition given in the civil case to strongly disagree that McPherson was severely dehydrated. He also made a series of accusations against the Medical Examiner Office's handling of the case and questioned its motive. Davis stated that Wood was not present during the autopsy and did not consult him when she signed the autopsy.

=== Destruction of evidence ===
Crow noted that Wood's credibility would be attacked due to the Medical Examiner Office's failure to follow its own policies; to preserve evidence, for the release of the body for cremation before a cause of death had been determined, and for the destruction of Davis’s autopsy notes.

=== Wood's explanation of the autopsy changes ===
The primary reason Wood gave for changing her findings was her realization that the microscopic slides of the popliteal vein and the photographs of muscle tissue in the surrounding area provided evidence of trauma which could explain the thrombus formation. She could not explain why she had not seen this before. Crow was highly critical of Wood in his memo, stating:

Her explanations concerning the reasoning behind the changes have been illogical and inconsistent. She vacillated in her conclusions even as she prepared the amended certificate. After talking to Joe Davis she executed a notarized change in the death certificate to accident and removed dehydration and bed rest as causative factors. She then reconsidered that decision and resolved to change the manner of death to homicide with dehydration listed as one of multiple factors and then again changed her mind the next morning, deciding to follow Joe Davis' initial advice.

— Douglas E. Crow

Crow also mentioned a unique set of circumstances that put Wood under tremendous pressure and might have affected the quality of her judgment. These being:

1. Wood's appearance on Inside Edition left her more vulnerable to litigation and committed her to a forensic position that would make any modification professionally embarrassing.
2. The fact that Davis, the forensic examiner that actually did the autopsy, was critical of her conclusions.
3. The defense suggestion that if forced to litigate it would reveal information extremely damaging to Wood's office and her career.

=== Conclusion ===
Crow concluded that even though there was probable cause, the actions and testimony of Wood had so muddied the facts that there wasn't enough credible evidence to prove the case beyond reasonable doubt, and recommended the dismissal of all charges.

While nothing in the review has caused me to believe that the central premises behind the prosecution are erroneous, our ability to establish these necessary facts beyond a reasonable doubt has clearly been compromised. While Dr. Wood is an extremely intelligent and knowledgeable expert who is a formidable witness when defending a valid position, her inability to coherently explain her decision even under benign questioning by me is completely perplexing. Because of Wood's admission of a serious forensic error, her illogical and unfortunately inconsistent justifications of her decision to change the death certificate and autopsy report, the inconsistency between the changes made in the death certificate and the forensic basis for our charges, her continuing equivocation on issues central to the criminal case, and the very real possibility that the cause of death listed by the Medical Examiner's Office is incorrect, I have come to the conclusion that presentation of the Medical Examiner's current testimony to a jury will create a reasonable doubt on crucial forensic issues. When combined with existing problems in the case, it is my recommendation that we should not continue to pursue the prosecution.

— Douglas E. Crow

== Timeline ==
1995

- December 5 – Lisa McPherson died while in the care of Flag Service Organization (FSO), a branch of the Church of Scientology.

1997

- February 19 – McPherson's family sued the Church of Scientology and the individuals involved for wrongful death, while the Church claimed it did nothing wrong toward McPherson.

1998

- September 15 – Dr. David Minkoff settled his portion of the wrongful death suit by having his malpractice insurance pay $100,000 to the estate.
- November 13 – Scientology was indicted on two felony charges in McPherson's death; abuse or neglect of a disabled adult, a second-degree felony, and unauthorized practice of medicine, a third-degree felony; the first criminal charges ever filed in the U.S. against Scientology. These charges were brought against Scientology as a corporation, not against any individuals, and the maximum penalty, had the charges been pursued and the Church found guilty, would have been a $15,000 fine plus costs.

1999

- December 6 – Florida State Attorney Bernie McCabe presented a response to Scientology's attempt to get the case dismissed.

2000

- February 23 – Wood changed McPherson's cause of death to an "accident". "Gone from the new report is the original reference to the bed rest and dehydration. Wood still traces the death to a blood clot behind McPherson's knee. But she lists McPherson's psychosis and a minor auto accident as major factors."
- March 8 – A group of more than 200 Scientologists moved to have the criminal case dismissed on the claim that it had "chilled the religious rights of every Scientologist" and that other Scientologists were now being treated with concern, suspicion or ridicule by non-Scientologists. A central point of the motion was that McPherson had undergone the Introspection Rundown, which the brief putting forth the motion called an "entirely religious" practice.
- April 4 – Scientology moved to have the entire criminal case dismissed. "The entire basis for the state's prosecution of this case has now collapsed," begins one of the many Scientology legal briefs arguing the case should be dismissed.
- June 12 – On the advice of Assistant State Attorney Douglas Crow, State Attorney Bernie McCabe dropped the criminal charges against the Church. According to a memo by Crow, medical examiner Joan Wood could not be counted on to confidently testify.

2001

- August 3 – Minkoff had his license suspended for one year and was fined $10,000 for prescribing medicine to McPherson at the request of her FSO caretakers without having ever seen her.

2002

- April 29 – Scientology accused McPherson attorney Ken Dandar of professional misconduct and perjury and tried to get him removed from the case.
- June 22 – Pinellas-Pasco Circuit Judge Frank Quesada dismissed the count alleging that McPherson was falsely imprisoned on the McPherson's civil suit.

2003

- August – Scientology sued Dandar for breach of contract, for having added Church leader David Miscavige to the wrongful death lawsuit despite a mutual agreement not to add additional defendants. In a 2003 jury trial, Scientology asked for over $2 million in damages, but received only $4,500 in attorney fees and no punitive damages.

2004

- May 28 – Under terms undisclosed to the public, the civil suit was settled out of court.

2009

- June 22 – Mark Rathbun, a former member of Scientology, admitted that he had instructed the Church to destroy files related to the case.

2012

- October 31 – Dandar filed a federal lawsuit against Scientology and its attorneys, asking for injunctive relief from the church's litigation, which he claimed was a violation of his civil rights.
- November 17 – In support of Dandar's lawsuit, Rathbun claimed in sworn testimony that Scientology spent $30 million to influence Florida judges and defame Dandar during the criminal and civil lawsuits concerning McPherson's death. Rathbun also claimed that Scientology influenced Wood's ruling of McPherson's death as "accident" by bribing her lawyer, Jeffrey Goodis, with Super Bowl tickets and other gifts. Goodis denied the charges.
- November 24 – Dandar added Miscavige as a defendant in his federal lawsuit against Scientology.
- November 28 – Mat Pesch, the former treasury secretary of the FSO, claimed that he witnessed the OSA dumping $20 million in FSO reserves into Scientology's legal defense over McPherson's death.

== Legacy ==
=== Memorial brick ===
In 2001, a group called Citizens for a Better Clearwater decided to renovate an unused alley owned by the City of Clearwater. They called the project Cleveland Street Gas Light Alley, and their fundraising efforts included soliciting donations for engraved paver bricks that would be laid in the walkway. The alley abutted the Coachman Building, owned by the Church of Scientology. Several Scientology critics ordered bricks, including a memorial brick for Lisa McPherson ordered by staff members of the Lisa McPherson Trust, an advocacy organization dedicated to "expose the deceptive and abusive practices of Scientology and help those victimized by [the Church of Scientology]". The committee reversed their initial decision to reject the brick donations from the critics and the bricks were placed. However, over the years, the Lisa McPherson brick has been vandalized many times and replaced.

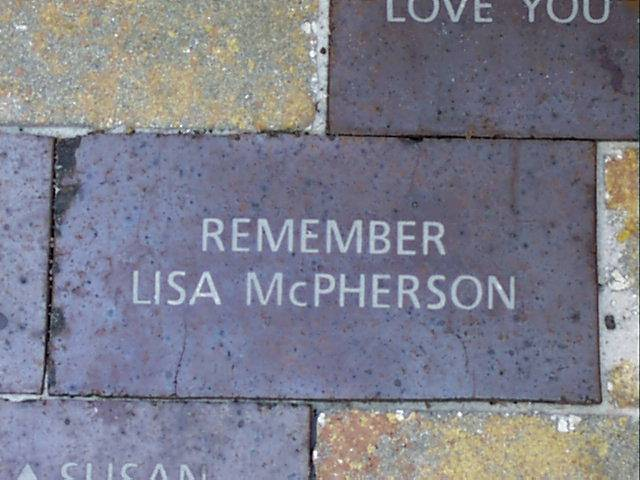
Memorial brick (2001)

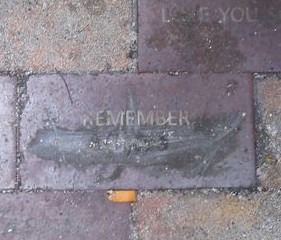
Brick defaced (2004)

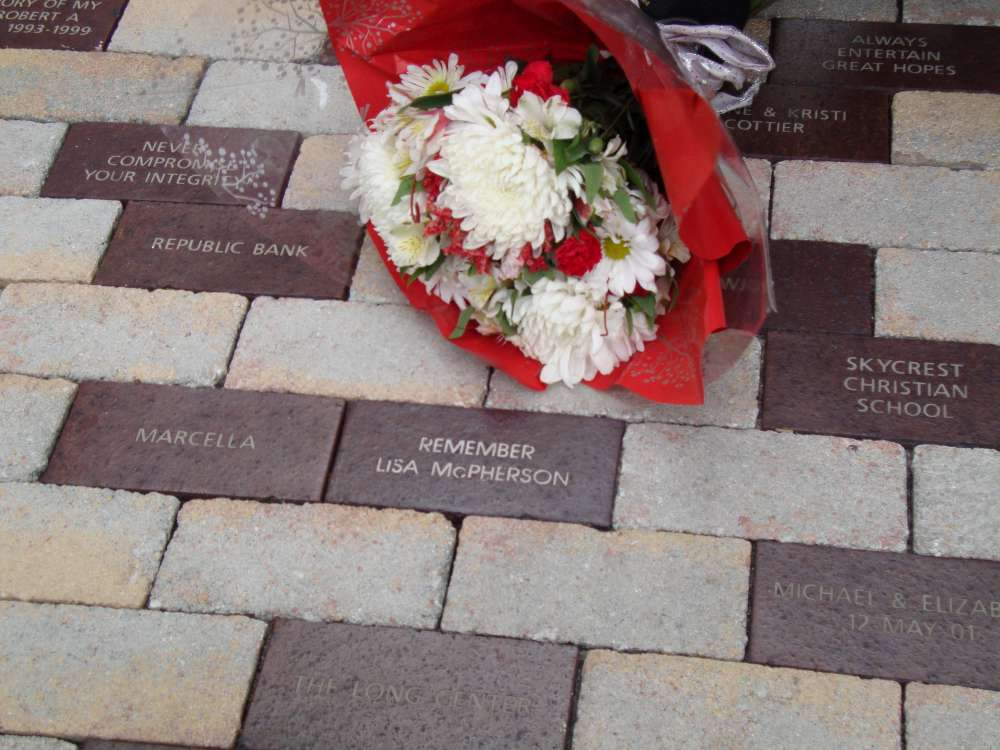
Replacement brick (2009)

=== Lisa McPherson Clause ===
As a result of the controversy surrounding McPherson's death, the Church of Scientology now requires members to sign a general release form each time they register for a new service, whereby they make certain agreements, such as acknowledging that Scientology is a religion and not intended to treat medical issues, promising not to sue the Church for any reason unless criminal negligence is assured, or disavowing psychiatric treatment. In the event a Scientologist is involuntarily placed into a psychiatric ward or institution, the form also grants permission to allow the Church to intervene on their behalf and have them released into the care of other Scientologists in order to undergo the Introspection Rundown or any other Scientology services deemed necessary.

=== Injunction against the film The Profit ===
During the civil suit against Scientology brought by McPherson's family members, an injunction was sought and obtained to keep the Scientology-critical film The Profit from being shown to avoid prejudicing the jury pool against Scientology.

== See also ==
- Lisa McPherson Trust – 1999–2001 organization that protested Scientology in Clearwater
- Project Chanology – worldwide protests held against Scientology on February 10, 2008, Lisa McPherson's birthday
- Death of Kaja Ballo
- Murder of Elli Perkins – a senior auditor at the Church of Scientology in Buffalo, New York, murdered by her schizophrenic son, Jeremy, on March 13, 2003
- Scientology and psychiatry
