= Timeline of L. Ron Hubbard =

Chronology of Scientology's founder

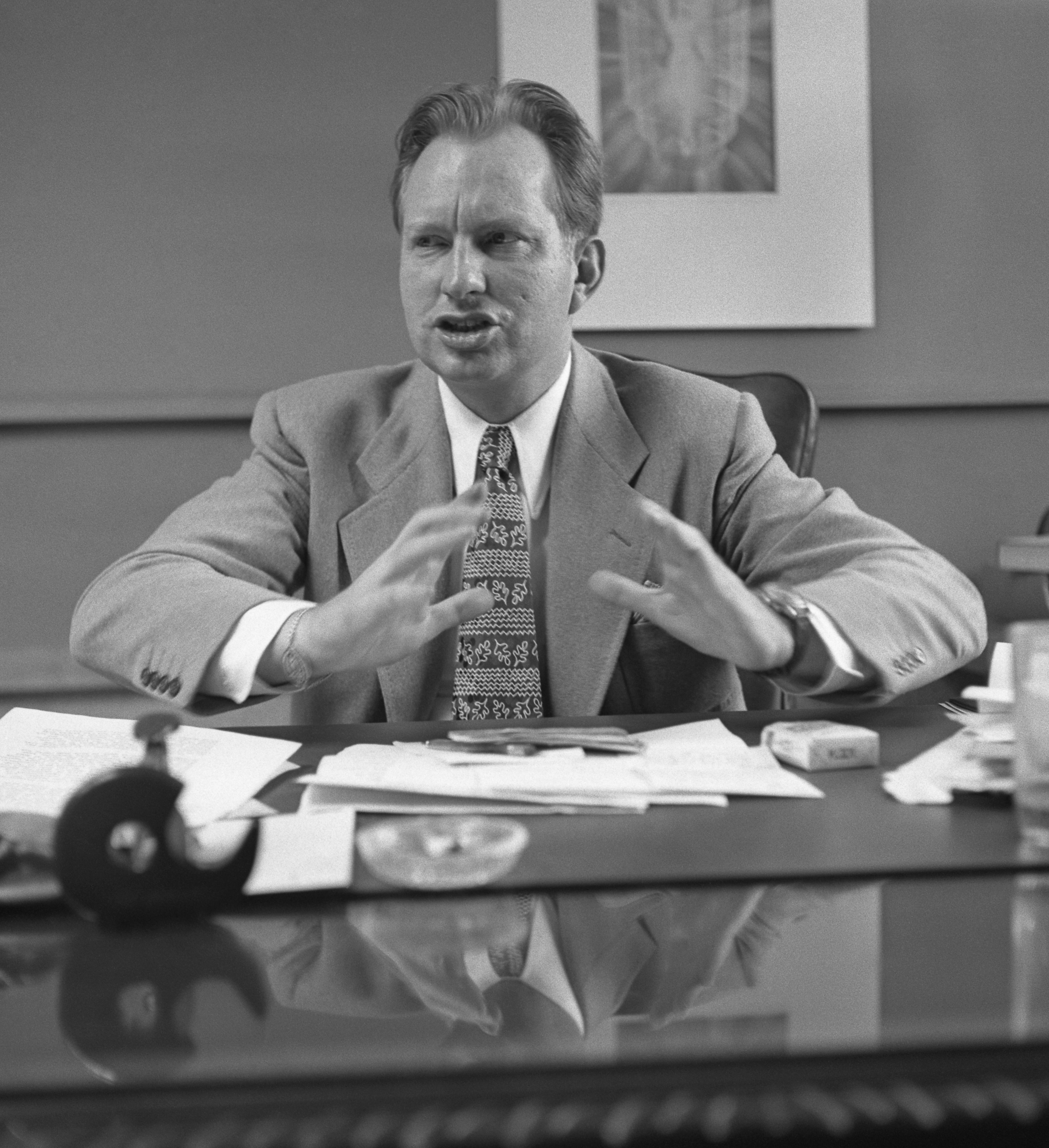
Scientology founder L. Ron Hubbard in 1950

This is a timeline of L. Ron Hubbard, founder of Scientology.

== Early life ==
=== 1910s ===
==== 1911 ====
- March 13, 1911, Lafayette Ronald Hubbard born in Tilden, Nebraska.

=== 1920s ===
==== 1922 ====
- 18 Feb 1922 - Harry Ross Hubbard visit to Helena recorded in local paper as USS Oklahoma undergoes repairs.
- 12 Mar 1922 - Harry Ross Hubbard assigned "assistant to disbursing" aboard USS Oklahoma.
- 16 Jul 1922 - Ron and mother leave Montana.

==== 1923 ====
- July 5 - Hubbard advances to First Class Scout in Tacoma, Washington Boy Scout Troop 31.
- October 20 - Hubbard's father detached from USS Oklahoma.
- November 1 - Hubbard and family travel depart San Francisco aboard USS U.S. Grant, traveling through the Panama Canal.
- December 11 - Awarded merit badges by Boy Scout Troop 10 of Washington DC.

==== 1924 ====
- March 28: Awarded Eagle Scout badge, was one of forty boys presented to President Calvin Coolidge.
- Hubbard enrolled at Union High School, Bremerton.

==== 1926 ====
- 1926-27: studied at Queen Anne High School in Seattle.
- June 12, 1926 - Approval of relief for $942.25 for Harry Ross Hubbard.

==== 1927 ====
- April - leaves Queen Anne.
- April 5: Hubbard's father sails for Guam; Weeks later, Hubbard and mother traveled to Guam aboard the President Madison and USS Gold Star via Hawaii, China, and the Philippines. Hubbard spent about six weeks on the island before returning to the United States.
- June 6: Hubbard arrives in Guam aboard USS Gold Star.
- July 16: Hubbard departs Guam aboard USS Nitro, while his parents remain behind.
- August 6: Hubbard arrives in Bremerton, Washington.
- September 6: Enrolled at Helena High School, Helena, Montana.
- October 1927: Hubbard joined Montana Army National Guard at 16, falsely stating he was 18. Enlisting at the State Armory in Helena, he served as a private in the Headquarters Company of 163rd Infantry.

==== 1928 ====
- May 1928 - Abandoned school and went back west to stay with his aunt and uncle in Seattle.
- June 31: Departed San Diego for Guam aboard USS Henderson.
- July 25: Hubbard arrives in Guam.
- October 6: Hubbard family departs for China.
- October to December 1928: Hubbard and parents visit China via the Philippines aboard the USS Gold Star.

==== 1929 ====
- 07 Jun 1929 - Harry Ross Hubbard detached from receiving ship at San Francisco and assigned to Washington Navy Yard.
- 18 Sep 1929 - Helena paper reports family statement that Harry Ross Hubbard has been placed in charge of "the supply and disbursing department at the naval hospital in Washington".

=== 1930s ===
==== 1930 ====
- February 1930 - enrolled at Woodward School for Boys in Washington, D.C. to earn credits for admission to George Washington University, thereby avoiding the university's entrance examination.
- June 1930 - Graduated from Woodward.
- September 1930 - entered George Washington University.
- October 5, 1930 - An article titled "What has Senator Walsh Done for Montana? Here is the Answer", lists a bill which "relieved Harry Hubbard from liability on account of the loss of money in his hands as an officer of the navy"

==== 1931 ====
- Enlisted as a Private in the United States Marine Corps Reserve, stating his age as 21 and listing his profession as "photographer". He was promoted to First Sergeant only six weeks later, a development that Jon Atack attributes to the fact that the unit he joined – the 20th Marine Corps Reserve – was actually a training unit connected with George Washington University. His character was rated "excellent".
- September 1931 - placed on academic probation.
- September 4, 1931 - Michigan newspaper reports Hubbard staying with local aviator Phillip W. Browning and attempting to revive two local glider clubs.
- September 8, 1931 - Michigan newspaper reports Hubbard injured in hit-and-run.
- Wrote for the George Washington University student newspaper, The University Hatchet, as a reporter for a few months in 1931.
- October 22: discharged from Marine Corps Reserve with the notation, "Not to be re-enlisted".

==== 1932 ====
- April 10, 1932 - Hubbard reportedly elected president of student chapter of American Society of Civil Engineers at GWU.
- Spring 1932 - Completed first year at GWU where he received a D average grade, earning an A for physical education, B for English, C for mechanical engineering, D for general chemistry and Fs for German and calculus.
- During his second year, he enrolled in a class on atomic and molecular physics – the "nuclear physics" course cited in his official biographies – but earned an F grade. His other grades were also poor, ranging from a B for English to D in calculus and electrical and magnetic physics.
- May 1932 - Hubbard announced the "Caribbean Motion Picture Expedition" in The University Hatchet aboard the schooner Doris Hamlin to explore and film the pirate "strongholds and bivouacs of the Spanish Main" and to "collect whatever one collects for exhibits in museums".
- June 23, 1932 - Hubbard and classmates depart from Baltimore. The ship was blown far off course, making an unplanned first landfall at Bermuda, before the ship sailed on to its intended first port of call, Martinique. As the expedition was critically short of money, the ship's owners ordered it to return to Baltimore,
- August 11, 1932 - Papers report the students have become stranded. Lt. Hubbard tells press he cabled $300 but his son would not accept the funds.
- August 25-29, 1932 - Hubbard travels from San Juan Puerto Rico to New York aboard SS Caomo. He lists his address as that of the US Naval Hospital in D.C.
- Fall 1932 - Hubbard refuses to return to university.
- November 4: Hubbard arrived in Puerto Rico aboard USS Kittery.

==== 1933 ====
- February 16: A letter describes Hubbard as field representative for Washington D.C. firm "West Indies Minerals" who had accompanied the letter's author on a survey of a small property near the town of Luquillo, Puerto Rico.
- March 30: Harry Ross Hubbard reassigned from "naval hospital, Washington" to Destroy division.
- April 13: Hubbard married Margaret "Polly" Grubb.
- August 18: Hubbard featured in the Washington Daily News, described as having "left here last year for Antilles, West Indies, in search of gold so that he might return and marry the girl he met shortly before his departure".
- Hubbard turned to full-time fiction writing to support himself and his new wife; six of his pieces were published commercially during 1932 to 1933

==== 1934 ====
- 1934 - Hubbard's first story, “The Green God”, appeared in Thrilling Adventures.
- May 7: Birth of Hubbard's first child, Lafayette Ronald Hubbard, Jr. ("Nibs").

==== 1936 ====
- January 15: Hubbard's second child, Katherine May, born. The Hubbards lived for a while in Laytonsville, Maryland.
- Spring 1936 - Hubbard family moves to Bremerton, Washington to live with Hubbard's aunts and grandmother, later settling in nearby South Colby.
- Hubbard spent an increasing amount of time in New York City, working out of a hotel room where his wife suspected him of carrying on affairs.

==== 1938 ====
- 1938 - Hubbard authors a manuscript called "Excalibur" which contains ideas that were later incorporated into Scientology.

==== 1939 ====
- 1939 - According to Barbara Klowden, Hubbard told her: "In 1939, I was very much in love with a girl. She felt that way too. When I knew she had a boyfriend coming up, I waited on the stairway with a gun, just for a moment. Then I said they are flies. I realized who and what I was and left. I told her I would leave her free to marry a sharpie with a cigar in his mouth from Muncie, Indiana."

=== 1940s ===
==== 1940 ====
- February 1940, Hubbard joined The Explorers Club and carried its flag on an "Alaskan Radio-Experimental Expedition". consisting of himself and his wife aboard his ketch Magician.
- July 1940, Magician's engine broke down only two days after setting off.
- August 30, 1940, the Hubbards reached Ketchikan after many delays following repeated engine breakdowns. The Ketchikan Chronicle reported that Hubbard's purpose in coming to Alaska "was two-fold, one to win a bet and another to gather material for a novel of Alaskan salmon fishing". Having underestimated the cost of the trip, he did not have enough money to repair the broken engine. He raised money by writing stories and contributing to the local radio station and eventually earned enough to fix the engine.
- Hubbard told The Seattle Star in a November 1940 letter that the expedition was plagued by problems and did not get any further than Ketchikan near the southern end of the Alaska Panhandle, far from the Aleutian Islands.
- December 27, 1940 Hubbards make it back to Puget Sound.

== Military career ==
=== 1941–1945 ===
==== 1941 ====
- March: Hubbard applied to US Navy.
- July 19: Hubbard was commissioned as a Lieutenant (junior grade) in the U.S. Naval Reserve.
- November: Hubbard entered permanent active duty.
- December 18: Hubbard sent to the Philippines via Australia.

==== 1942 ====
- January 11: Hubbard put ashore in Brisbane
- February 14: U.S. Naval Attaché to Australia on Hubbard: "By assuming unauthorized authority and attempting to perform duties for which he has no qualifications, he became the source of much trouble. ... This officer is not satisfactory for independent duty assignment. He is garrulous and tries to give impressions of his importance. He also seems to think that he has unusual ability in most lines. These characteristics indicate that he will require close supervision for satisfactory performance of any intelligence duty."
- February: He was ordered back to the United States aboard the transport vessel USS Chaumont the following month at the instigation of the US Naval Attaché to Australia, who cabled Washington to complain about him.
- March 9, 1942 - Hubbard boards MV Pennant bound for US.
- March, returning to the US at the end of March 1942, Hubbard was posted to the Office of the Cable Censor in New York City.
- June: Hubbard was sent instead to the shipyard of George Lawley & Sons of Neponset, Massachusetts, where the fishing trawler MV Mist was being converted for military use as a naval yard patrol (YP) vessel.
- July 28: USS YP-422 commissioned.
- August: The YP-422 put to sea from the Boston Navy Yard to carry out a 27-hour training exercise.
- Hubbard fell out with a senior officer at the shipyard and sent a critical memorandum to the Vice-Chief of Naval Operations (VCNO) in Washington, D.C..
- September 25: The Commandant of the Navy Yard writes Hubbard is "not temperamentally fitted for independent command" and requesting that Hubbard be removed and ordered to "other duty under immediate supervision of a more senior officer."
- October 1: Hubbard loses command, ordered to New York.
- November: Hubbard sent to the Submarine Chaser Training Center in Florida.

==== 1943 ====
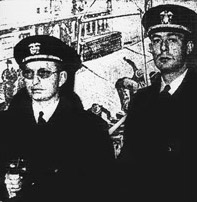
Lts (jg) L. Ron Hubbard and Thomas S. Moulton in Portland, Oregon in 1943

- January 17: posted to the Albina Engine & Machine Works in Portland, Oregon, where he was to take command of the subchaser USS PC-815 when she was commissioned.
- April 21: USS PC-815 commissioned with Hubbard in command.
- May 18: USS PC-815 departs Portland for Astoria, Oregon. After participating for a day in an air-sea rescue operation, USS PC-815 was ordered to sail to San Diego to commence its shakedown cruise.
- May 19: PC-815's sonar detected what the crew believed to be an enemy submarine off Cape Lookout Over the next two and a half days, Hubbard fired a total of 35 depth charges and a number of gun rounds to target what Hubbard believed to be two Imperial Japanese Navy submarines.
- May 21: PC-815 was ordered back to Astoria. Following its return to Astoria, the USS PC-815 was ordered to escort a new aircraft carrier to San Diego, where the subchaser was to participate in exercises.
- June 28: Hubbard ordered his crew to fire in the direction of the Coronado Islands. He did not realize that the islands belonged to Mexico, an ally, and were garrisoned by Mexican Navy personnel.
- June 30: Hubbard appears before a naval Board of Investigation in San Diego.
- July 7 - Hubbard reprimanded and removed from command, after being found to have disregarded orders by carrying out an unsanctioned gunnery practice and violating Mexican waters
- On the same day that Hubbard was sent a formal letter of admonition, he reported sick with complaints of epigastric pains and possible malaria. Spent 77 days on the sick list.
- October: Hubbard sent on a six-week training course at the Naval Small Craft Training Center in San Pedro, California.
- December: Hubbard assigned to crew of USS Algol.

==== 1944 ====
- July: Vessel was commissioned with Hubbard in the role of Navigation and Training Officer.
- September 27, 1944 - 4:30 PM: Aboard the USS Algol, Hubbard reported that he had discovered "an attempt at sabotage" consisting of a Coke bottle filled with gasoline with a cloth wick inserted, concealed among the ship's cargo. At 10:14 the following day, Hubbard was ordered to depart the ship.
- Hubbard failed his examinations for an overseas posting.

==== 1945 ====
- January 1945 - Hubbard posted to the Naval Civil Affairs Staging Area in Monterey, California.
- April 1945 - Reported sick with stomach pains in Oak Knoll Naval Hospital in Oakland, California.
- August 1945 - Hubbard moved into the Pasadena mansion of John "Jack" Whiteside Parsons.
- October 1945 - Naval Board found that Hubbard was "considered physically qualified to perform duty ashore, preferably within the continental United States".
- December 4, 1945 - Discharged from hospital.

== After the war ==
=== 1946–1948 ===
==== 1946 ====
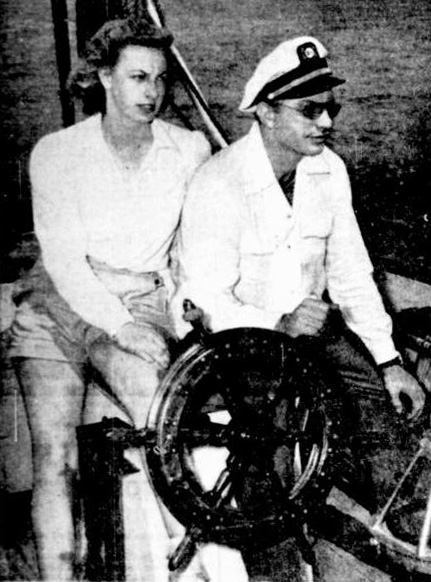
Hubbard and second wife Sara

- January 4: Hubbard and Parsons begin Babalon Working.
- February 17: Hubbard transferred to inactive duty.
- July 1: Parsons files suit against Hubbard.
- August 10: Hubbard married Sara, while still married to Polly.

==== 1947 ====
- April 14: Polly files for divorce on the grounds of "desertion and non-support".
- October 15: Hubbard writes to Veterans Administration (VA): "My last physician informed me that it might be very helpful if I were to be examined and perhaps treated psychiatrically or even by a psychoanalyst. Toward the end of my service I avoided out of pride any mental examinations, hoping that time would balance a mind which I had every reason to suppose was seriously affected. I cannot account for nor rise above long periods of moroseness and suicidal inclinations, and have newly come to realize that I must first triumph above this before I can hope to rehabilitate myself at all."
- December 2: Death of Aleister Crowley is national news in US. According to Hubbard's son Ronald DeWolf, the death of Aleister Crowley was a pivotal event that led Hubbard to "take over the mantle of the Beast".
- December 24: Divorce from Polly finalized.

==== 1948 ====
- Hubbard told a 1948 convention of science fiction fans that Excalibur's inspiration came during an operation in which he "died" for eight minutes
- June 1948 - Nationally syndicated wire service United Press runs story on American Legion-sponsored hospital in Savannah, Georgia which sought to keep mentally-ill war veterans out of jail.
- August: Hubbard arrested in San Luis Obispo for check fraud.
- August 19: Hubbard arraigned in San Gabriel Township Justice Court, pleaded not guilty.
- August 31: At trial, Hubbard entered a plea of guilty to a charge of petty theft, for which he was ordered to pay a $25 fine.
- In late 1948 Hubbard and Sara moved to Savannah, Georgia. Hubbard later wrote of having volunteered in a psychiatric clinic observing a "Dr. Center" in Savannah.
- November 24, 1948 - Letter to Heinlein promises "a book risen from the ashes of old Excalibur which details in full the mathematics of the human mind, solves all the problems of the ages and gives six recipes for aphrodisiacs and plays a mouth organ with the left foot."

== Dianetics era ==
=== 1949–1951 ===
==== 1949 ====
- First published work on Dianetics ("Terra Incognita: The Mind") appeared in the Winter/Spring issue of the Explorers Club Journal.
- January 1949 - Hubbard writes that he is composing a "book of psychology" about "the cause and cure of nervous tension" with working titles of The Dark Sword, Excalibur or Science of the Mind.
- Spring 1949—Editor John W. Campbell invited Hubbard and Sara to move into a cottage at 666 East St, Bay Head, New Jersey, not far from his own home at Plainfield.
- July 1949, Campbell recruits acquaintance Dr. Joseph Winter to help with "Dianetics".

==== 1950 ====
- March 8: The birth of Hubbard's second daughter Alexis Valerie, delivered by Winter.
- April 1950: "Hubbard Dianetic Research Foundation" established in Elizabeth, New Jersey, with Hubbard, Sara, Winter and Campbell on the board of directors.
- May 9: Dianetics: The Modern Science of Mental Health published, alongside companion article in May issue of Astounding's.
- August 10: At Los Angeles' Shrine Auditorium, Hubbard presents a young woman called Sonya Bianca (a pseudonym) to a large audience as "the world's first Clear." Bianca proved unable to answer questions from the audience testing her memory and analytical abilities, including the question of the color of Hubbard's tie.
- October 30: Hubbard resigned his commission effective Oct 30.
- By late 1950, the Elizabeth, N.J. Foundation was in financial crisis and the Los Angeles Foundation was more than $200,000 in debt. Winter and Art Ceppos, the publisher of Hubbard's book, resigned under acrimonious circumstances. Campbell also resigned, criticizing Hubbard for being impossible to work with, and blamed him for the disorganization and financial ruin of the Foundations. By the summer of 1951, the Elizabeth, N.J. Foundation and all of its branches had closed.
- December 20: In Los Angeles, Hubbard pays $50 fine for leaving 8-month-old daughter Alexis locked in car.

==== 1951 ====
- February 9: Bodies of David Cary and his wife Helen were found after about two weeks. Both had recently been involved in the Dianetics Institute in Los Angeles, David serving as an instructor there. Police conclude Helen shot her husband and then turned the gun on herself.
- February 23:
  - Sara Hubbard contacted Jack Maloney, the national executive officer of the Hubbard Dianetic Research Foundation in Elizabeth, New Jersey. Sara informed Maloney "that competent medical advisors recommended that said Hubbard be committed to a private sanitarium for psychiatric observation and treatment of a mental ailment known as paranoid schizophrenia". Maloney informed L. Ron Hubbard.
  - That night, L. Ron Hubbard, accompanied by Foundation staffers Frank Dessler and Richard De Mille, kidnap Hubbard's year-old daughter Alexis and wife Sara. Hubbard attempted unsuccessfully to find a doctor to examine Sara and declare her insane. He let Sara go but took Alexis to Havana, Cuba.
- March 1951 - Hubbard writes to the FBI denouncing Sara and Miles of being Communist infiltrators. An agent annotated his correspondence with the comment, "Appears mental."
- April 11: Sara's story published in press.
- April 15: Hubbard writes letter to Sara "I have been in the Cuban military hospital and I am being transferred to the United States next week as a classified scientist immune from interference of all kind... I may live a long time and again I may not. But Dianetics will last 10,000 years-for the Army and Navy have it now."
- April 23: Sara files divorce suit on that accuses him of marrying her bigamously and subjecting her to sleep deprivation, beatings, strangulation, kidnapping and exhortations to commit suicide. The case led to newspaper headlines such as "Ron Hubbard Insane, Says His Wife." Her claims of "systematic torture" allegedly suffered at Hubbard's hands attracted widespread media attention.
- May 14: Hubbard writes to the FBI that Sara had tried to kill him: "I was knocked out, had a needle thrust into my heart to give it a jet of air to produce "coronary thrombosis" and was given an electric shock with a 110 volt current."
- June 1951: Sara finally secures the return of daughter by signing a retraction of her earlier statements.
- June 1951: Science of Survival was published.
- September 3: Time Magazine reports that early Dianetics supporter Joseph Winter M.D. has now concluded "that it is dangerous for laymen to try to audit each other".

== Scientology era ==
=== 1950s ===
==== 1952 ====
- February: After learning that the Hubbard Dianetic Foundation of Wichita, Kansas would be liable for the debts of the defunct Hubbard Dianetic Research Foundation of Elizabeth, New Jersey, the board of directors, led by Don Purcell, voted to file for voluntary bankruptcy over Hubbard's objections. Hubbard forms a rival Hubbard College, also in Wichita, and disputes control of the copyrights of the Dianetics materials.
- March 1952: Hubbard marries Mary Sue.
- May: Hubbard publicly announces the formal establishment of the philosophy of Scientology and the formation of the Hubbard Association of Scientologists International, demonstrates the E-meter, and moves to Phoenix, Arizona.
- July: Scientology: A History of Man published.
- December: Arrest in Philadelphia.

==== 1953 ====
- February 27: Hubbard telegraphs Scientologist Richard de Mille urging de Mille to procure him a Ph.D. from a degree mill.
- February 1953: Hubbard acquires a doctorate from the unaccredited Sequoia University.
- April 10: Hubbard writes to Helen O'Brien: "I await your reaction on the religion angle. In my opinion, we couldn't get worse public opinion than we have had or have less customers with what we've got to sell. A religious charter would be necessary in Pennsylvania or NJ to make it stick. But I sure could make it stick."
- July 19: Letter to Helen O'Brien requests construction of hypnosis-inducing briefcase to cure insanity. He writes: 'This would mean the immediate end of psychiatric resistance to Scientology.'
- December: Church of Scientology, Church of American Science and Church of Spiritual Engineering incorporated in Elizabeth, New Jersey by L. Ron Hubbard. Co-signatories were Henrietta Hubbard, L. Ron Hubbard Jr., John Galusha, Verna Greenough and Barbara Bryan. Named as trustees of the Church of Scientology were L. Ron Hubbard, Mary Sue Hubbard (not present), and John Galusha.
- September, Hubbard addresses the three-day International Congress of Dianeticists and Scientologists in Philadelphia.
- October & November, lectures to Hubbard Association in Camden, New Jersey.

==== 1954 ====
- The Church of Scientology is incorporated (renamed to Church of Scientology of California in 1956).
- The Internal Revenue Service grants a tax exemption to the Church of Scientology of California (CSC).

==== 1955 ====
- April: The Hubbard Association of Scientologists International holds the First Australian Scientology Congress in Prahran, Victoria, Australia.
- July: The Founding Church of Scientology was organized in Washington, D.C.

==== 1959 ====
- February 23: Ron DeWolf leaves the church.
- Hubbard moved to England and bought Saint Hill Manor in Sussex, from which he would direct international operations and expansion until 1967.

=== 1960s ===
==== 1963 ====
- January 4: The US Food and Drug Administration raided the Founding Church of Scientology and seized approximately 100 of the Church's E-meters as illegal medical devices.

==== 1965 ====
- The Church of Scientology was banned in several Australian states, starting with Victoria. The ban was based on the Anderson Report, which found that the auditing process involved "command" hypnosis, in which the hypnotist assumes "positive authoritative control" over the patient."

==== 1966 ====
- Narconon founded.
- Hubbard declared South African Scientologist John McMaster to be the first true Clear. (McMaster left the Sea Org in November 1969)
- 7 April - report of Hubbard having entered Rhodesia
- 15 July - Hubbard departs Rhodesia after being ordered out of the country.
- November - Hubbard travels to Tangier, Morocco.

==== 1967 ====
- Hubbard travels from Tangiers to Las Palmas, Canary Islands.
- OT III is made available to Scientologists.
- The Sea Organization (or Sea Org) officially established.
- December 27: The first Advanced Organization, offering the advanced levels of Scientology to the public, was established aboard the Royal Scotman, the flagship of the Sea Organization. (This ship was later renamed the Apollo.)

==== 1968 ====
- Hubbard films an interview with Daily Mail's Peter Smith in Bizerta, Tunisia.

=== 1970s ===
==== 1972 ====
- September: Hubbard travels to New York and goes into hiding.

==== 1973 ====
- December: Hubbard injured in motorcycle accident.
- Rehabilitation Project Force is established.

==== 1975 ====
- Summer - In Curaçao, Hubbard suffered a heart attack and pulmonary embolism. Hubbard spends two days in the ICU, three weeks in hospital.
- December 5 - The Hubbards move to King Arthur's Court, a condominium in Dunedin, near Clearwater, Florida. When moving out, they leave behind a "cache" of unregistered weapons, including a short-barreled rifle, cleared mistakenly by US Customs. The Assistant US Attorney declines to prosecute, leaving ATF "furious."

==== 1976 ====
- October - Hubbards move to La Quinta.
- November 12 - Quentin Hubbard dies by suicide.

==== 1977 ====
- July 15 - Hubbard flees with Pat Broeker to Sparks, Nevada.

==== 1978 ====
- August 18: Hubbard collapses while filming in the desert. Hubbard had a pulmonary embolism, falling into a coma, but recovered.

==== 1979 ====
- March: Hubbard moves to Hemet
- October 26: Eleven senior people in the church's Guardian's Office were convicted of obstructing justice, burglary of government offices, and theft of documents and government property. (See Operation Snow White)

=== 1980s ===
==== 1980 ====
- February: Hubbard departs with Annie and Pat Broeker.

==== 1982 ====
- Battlefield Earth was published.

==== 1985 ====
- December: Hubbard allegedly attempts suicide by e-meter, according to caretaker Sarge Pfauth.

==== 1986 ====
- January 17: Hubbard suffers a stroke.
- January 24: Hubbard dies at his ranch near San Luis Obispo, California.
