= L. Ron Hubbard =

American writer and Scientology founder (1911–1986)

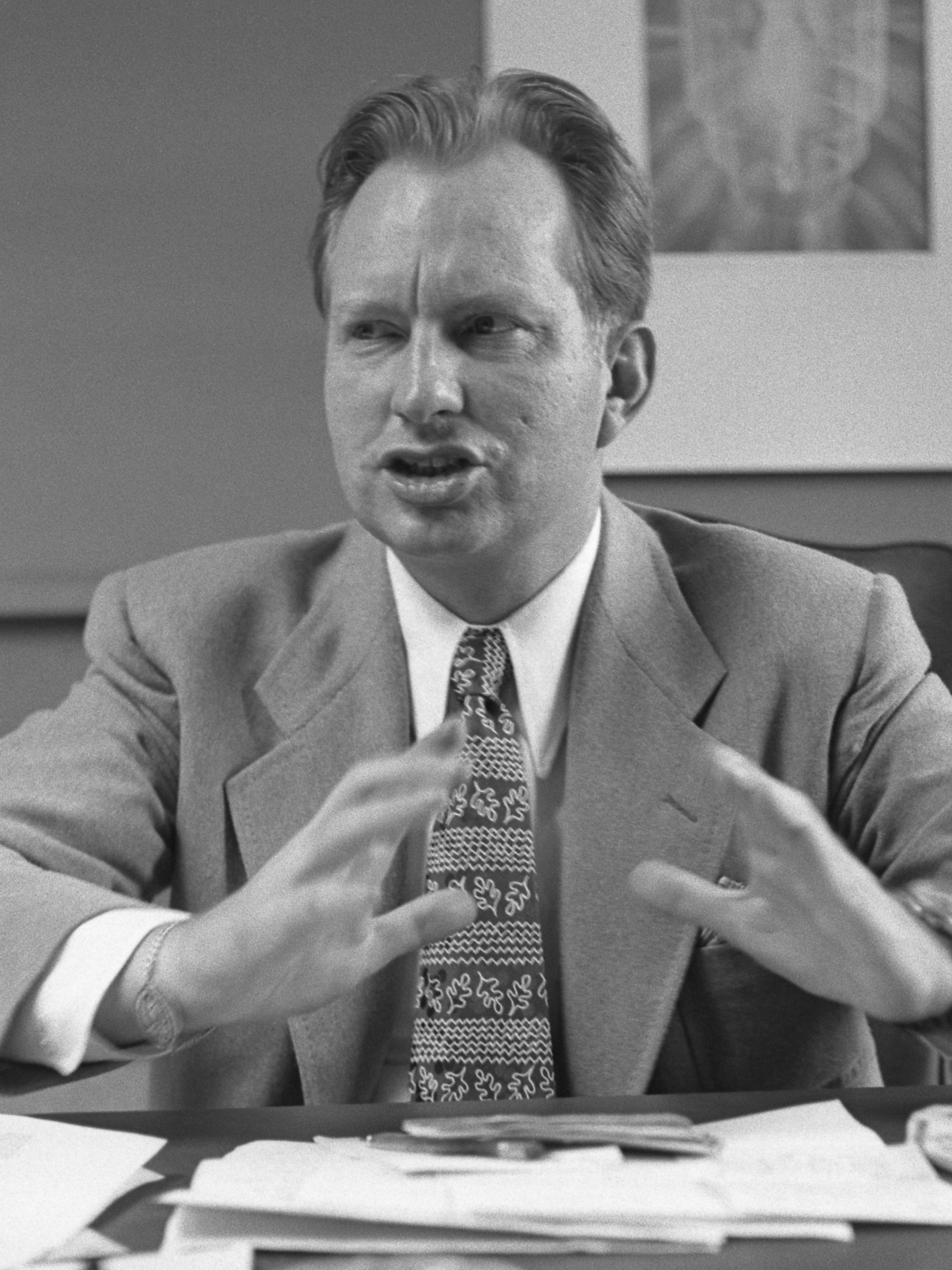
- Hubbard in 1950
- Born: Lafayette Ronald Hubbard; March 13, 1911; Tilden, Nebraska, U.S.
- Died: January 24, 1986 (aged 74); Creston, California, U.S.
- Other name: LRH
- Education: George Washington University (dropped out)
- Occupation: Author
- Known for: Inventor of dianetics, founder of Scientology
- Notable work: Dianetics: The Modern Science of Mental Health (1950); Battlefield Earth (1982)
- Criminal charges: Petty theft (1948); Fraud (in absentia, 1978)
- Criminal penalty: Fine of ₣35,000 and four years in prison (unserved)
- Spouses: Margaret "Polly" Grubb (m. 1933; div. 1947) Sara Northrup Hollister (m. 1946; div. 1951) Mary Sue Whipp (m. 1952)
- Children: 7, including Ronald, Diana and Quentin
- Relatives: Jamie DeWolf (great-grandson)
- Military career
- Branch: United States Navy
- Service years: 1941–1945 (Active); 1945–1950 (Reserve)
- Rank: Lieutenant
- Commands: USS YP-422 and USS PC-815
- Conflicts: World War II; Pacific Theater
- Awards: Navy Pistol Marksmanship Ribbon; Navy Rifle Marksmanship Ribbon; American Defense Service Medal; Asiatic–Pacific Campaign Medal; American Campaign Medal; World War II Victory Medal

Lafayette Ronald Hubbard (March 13, 1911 – January 24, 1986) was an American science fiction author and the founder of Scientology. A prolific writer of pulp science fiction and fantasy novels in his early career, in 1950 he authored the pseudoscientific book Dianetics: The Modern Science of Mental Health and established organizations to promote and practice Dianetics techniques. Hubbard created Scientology in 1952 after losing the intellectual rights to his literature on Dianetics in bankruptcy. He would lead the Church of Scientology – variously described as a cult, a new religious movement, or a business – until his death in 1986.

Born in Tilden, Nebraska, in 1911, Hubbard spent much of his childhood in Helena, Montana. While his father was posted to the U.S. naval base on Guam in the late 1920s, Hubbard traveled to Asia and the South Pacific. In 1930, Hubbard enrolled at George Washington University to study civil engineering but dropped out in his second year. He began his career as an author of pulp fiction and married Margaret Grubb, who shared his interest in aviation.

Hubbard was an officer in the Navy during World War II, where he briefly commanded two ships but was removed from command both times. The last few months of his active service were spent in a hospital, being treated for a variety of complaints. After the war, he sought psychiatric help from a veteran's charity hospital in Georgia. While acting as a lay analyst, or peer counselor, in Georgia, Hubbard began writing what would become Dianetics. In 1951, Hubbard's wife Sara said that experts had diagnosed him with paranoid schizophrenia and recommended lifelong hospitalization. In 1953, the first Scientology organizations were founded by Hubbard. In 1954, a Scientology church in Los Angeles was founded, which became the Church of Scientology International. Hubbard added organizational management strategies, principles of pedagogy, a theory of communication and prevention strategies for healthy living to the teachings of Scientology. As Scientology came under increasing media attention and legal pressure in a number of countries during the late 1960s and early 1970s, Hubbard spent much of his time at sea as "commodore" of the Sea Organization, a private, quasi-paramilitary Scientologist fleet.

Hubbard returned to the United States in 1975 and went into seclusion in the California desert after an unsuccessful attempt to take over the town of Clearwater, Florida. In 1978, Hubbard was convicted of fraud in absentia by France. In the same year, 11 high-ranking members of Scientology were indicted on 28 charges for their role in the Church's Snow White Program, a systematic program of espionage against the United States government. One of the indicted was Hubbard's wife Mary Sue Hubbard; he himself was named an unindicted co-conspirator. Hubbard spent the remaining years of his life in seclusion, attended to by a small group of Scientology officials.

Following his 1986 death, Scientology leaders announced that Hubbard's body had become an impediment to his work and that he had decided to "drop his body" to continue his research on another plane of existence. The Church of Scientology describes Hubbard in hagiographic terms, though many of his autobiographical statements were fictitious. Sociologist Stephen Kent has observed that Hubbard "likely presented a personality disorder known as malignant narcissism."

== Life ==
=== Before Dianetics ===
Lafayette Ronald Hubbard was born on March 13, 1911, the only child of Ledora May Waterbury, who had trained as a teacher, and Harry Ross Hubbard, a low-ranking United States Navy officer. Like many military families of the era, the Hubbards repeatedly relocated around the United States and overseas. After moving to Kalispell, Montana, they settled in Helena in 1913. Hubbard's father rejoined the Navy in April 1917, during World War I, while his mother worked as a clerk for the state government. After his father was posted to Guam, Hubbard and his mother traveled there with brief stop-overs in a couple of Chinese ports. In high school, Hubbard contributed to the school paper, but was dropped from enrollment due to failing grades. After he failed the Naval Academy entrance examination, Hubbard was enrolled in a Virginia Preparatory School to prepare him for a second attempt. However, after complaining of eye strain, Hubbard was diagnosed with myopia, precluding any future enrollment in the Naval Academy. As an adult, Hubbard would privately write to himself that his eyes had gone bad when he "used them as an excuse to escape the naval academy".

Hubbard was sent to the Woodward School in D.C., as graduates qualified for admission to George Washington University without having to take the entrance exam. Hubbard graduated in June 1930 and entered GWU. Academically, Hubbard did poorly and was repeatedly warned about bad grades, but he contributed to the student newspaper and was active in the glider club. In 1932, Hubbard organized a student trip to the Caribbean, but amid multiple misfortunes and insufficient funding, the passengers took to burning Hubbard in effigy and the trip was canceled by the ship's owners. Hubbard did not return to GWU the following year.

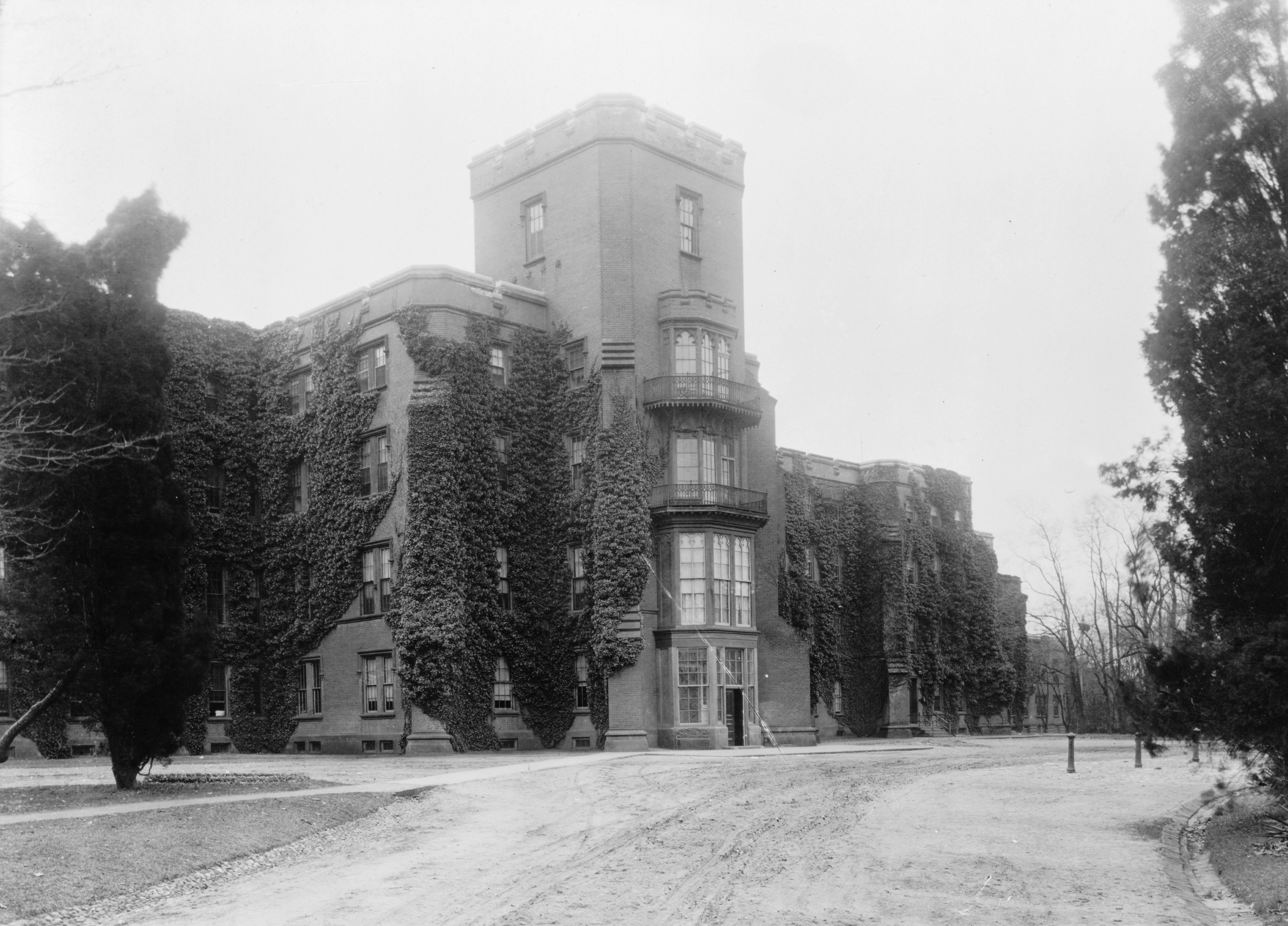
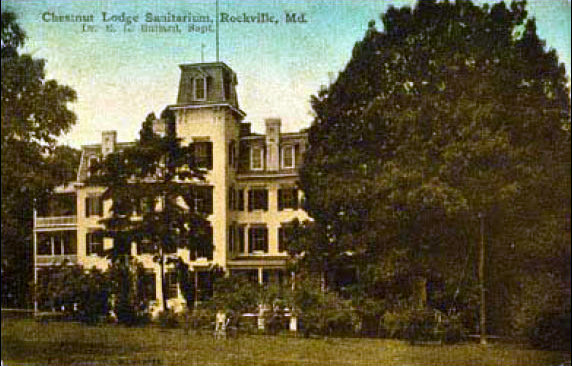
Hubbard spoke of interactions with psychiatrists at both St. Elizabeths Hospital in D.C. (top) and nearby Chestnut Lodge Sanitarium (bottom).

For much of the 1920s and 1930s, Hubbard lived in Washington D.C., and he would later claim to have interacted with multiple psychiatrists in the city. Hubbard described encounters in 1923 and 1930 with navy psychiatrist Joseph Thompson. Thompson was controversial within the American psychiatric community for his support of lay analysis, the practice of psychoanalysis by those without medical degrees. Hubbard also recalled interacting with William Alanson White, supervisor of the D.C. psychiatric hospital St. Elizabeths. According to Hubbard, both White and Thompson had regarded his athleticism and lack of interest in psychology as signs of a good prognosis. Hubbard later claimed to have been trained by both Thompson and White. Hubbard also discussed his interactions at Chestnut Lodge, a D.C.-area facility specializing in schizophrenia, repeatedly complaining that their staff misdiagnosed an unnamed individual with the condition:

External videos
- Hubbard lecture on schizophrenia and his interactions at Chestnut Lodge

There's a place by the name of Walnut Lodge... They don't see anything humorous in that, by the way... They sent three people to see me and every one of them was under treatment—and this was their staff! But anyway, very good people there, I'm sure... Didn't happen to meet any. Have some fine patients though! Anyway, they treat only schizophrenia. And so they take only schizophrenics. Now how do they get only schizophrenics? Well, anybody sent to Walnut Lodge is a classified schizophrenic. And they take somebody who is a dementia praecox unclassified or a more modern definition, a mania-depressive and they take him from Saint Elizabeths and they take him over to Walnut Lodge and he goes onto the books as a schizophrenic. Why? Because Walnut Lodge takes only schizophrenics.

==== Pre-war fiction ====
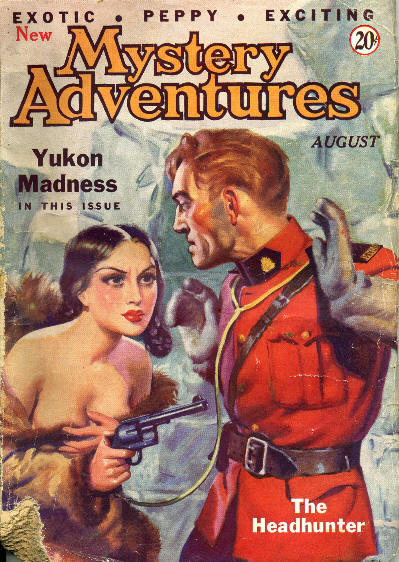
Hubbard's adventure story "Yukon Madness" which was published in 1935

In 1933, Hubbard renewed a relationship with a fellow glider pilot, Margaret "Polly" Grubb and the two were quickly married on April 13. The following year, she gave birth to a son who was named Lafayette Ronald Hubbard, Jr., later nicknamed "Nibs". A second child, Katherine May, was born two years later. The Hubbards lived for a while in Laytonsville, Maryland, but were chronically short of money. In the spring of 1936, they moved to Bremerton, Washington. They lived there for a time with Hubbard's aunts and grandmother before finding a place of their own at nearby South Colby. According to one of his friends at the time, Robert MacDonald Ford, the Hubbards were "in fairly dire straits for money" but sustained themselves on the income from Hubbard's writing.

Hubbard began a writing career and tried to write for mainstream publications. Hubbard soon found his niche in the pulp fiction magazines, becoming a prolific and prominent writer in the medium. From 1934 until 1940, Hubbard produced hundreds of short stories and novels. Hubbard is remembered for his "prodigious output" across a variety of genres, including adventure fiction, aviation, travel, mysteries, westerns, romance, and science fiction. His first full-length novel, Buckskin Brigades, was published in 1937. The novel told the story of "Yellow Hair", a white man adopted into the Blackfeet tribe, with promotional material claiming the author had been a "bloodbrother" of the Blackfeet. The New York Times Book Review praised the book, writing "Mr. Hubbard has reversed a time-honored formula and has given a thriller to which, at the end of every chapter or so, another paleface bites the dust."

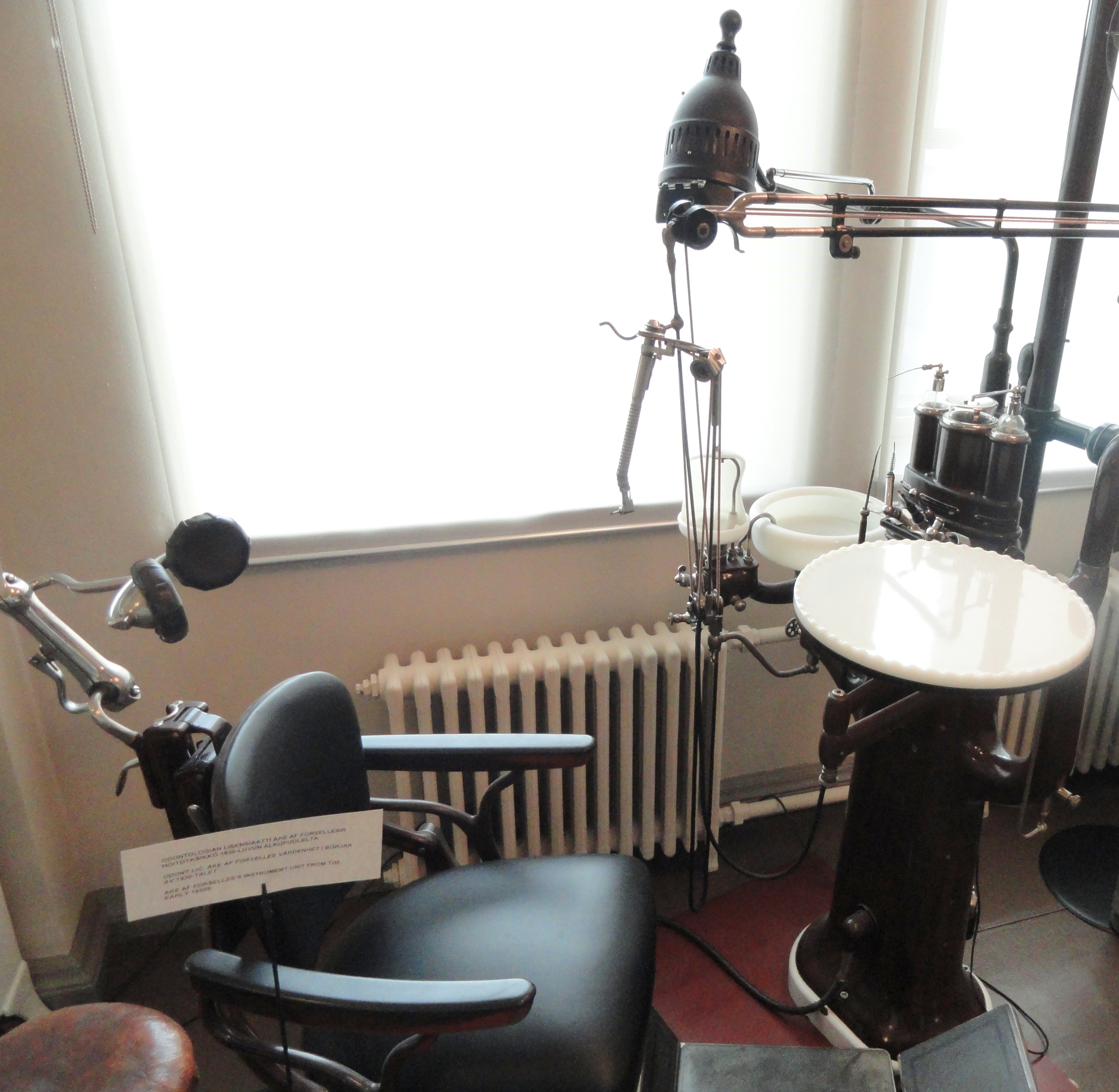
Museum recreation of a 1930s dentist office; the setting where Hubbard reported having a "near-death experience".

On New Year's Day, 1938, Hubbard reportedly underwent a dental procedure and reacted to the anesthetic gas used in the procedure. According to his account, this triggered a revelatory near-death experience. Allegedly inspired by this experience, Hubbard composed a manuscript, which was never published, with working titles of The One Command and Excalibur. Hubbard sent telegrams to several book publishers, but nobody bought the manuscript. Hubbard wrote to his wife:

Sooner or later Excalibur will be published... I have high hopes of smashing my name into history so violently that it will take a legendary form even if all books are destroyed. That goal is the real goal as far as I am concerned.

Hubbard found greater success after being taken under the supervision of editor John W. Campbell, who published many of Hubbard's short stories and serialized novelettes in his magazines Unknown and Astounding Science Fiction. Hubbard's novel Final Blackout told the story of a British lieutenant who rises to become dictator of the United Kingdom. In July 1940, Campbell magazine Unknown published a psychological horror by Hubbard titled Fear about an ethnologist who becomes paranoid that demons are out to get him—the work was well-received, drawing praise from Ray Bradbury, Isaac Asimov, and others. In November and December 1940, Unknown serialized Hubbard's novel Typewriter in the Sky about a pulp fiction writer whose friend becomes trapped inside one of his stories.

==== Military career ====
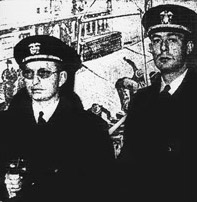
Hubbard (left) in 1943

In 1941, Hubbard applied to join the United States Navy. His application was accepted, and he was commissioned as a lieutenant junior grade in the United States Naval Reserve on July 19, 1941. By November, he was posted to New York for training as an intelligence officer. The day after Pearl Harbor, Hubbard was posted to the Philippines and departed the US bound for Australia. But while in Australia awaiting transport to the Philippines, Hubbard was suddenly ordered back to the United States after being accused by the US Naval Attaché to Australia of sending blockade-runner Don Isidro "three thousand miles out of her way".

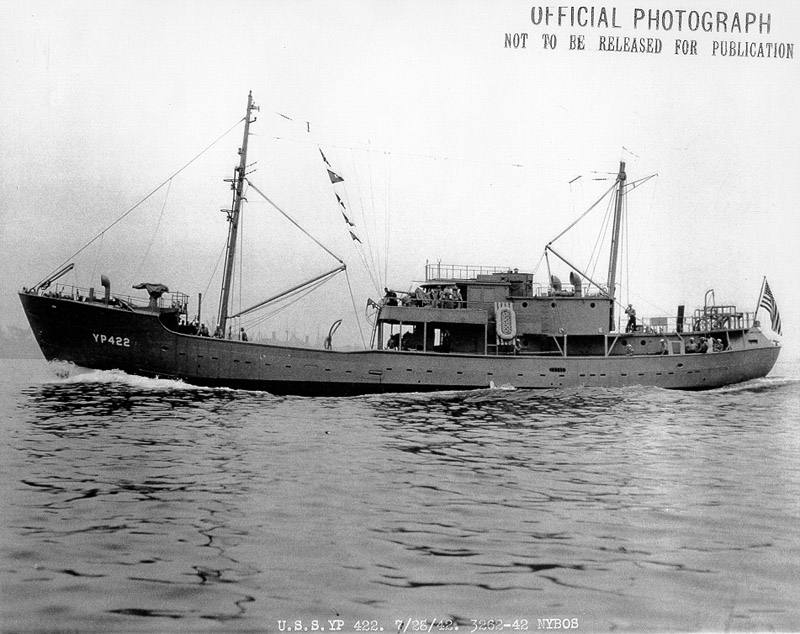
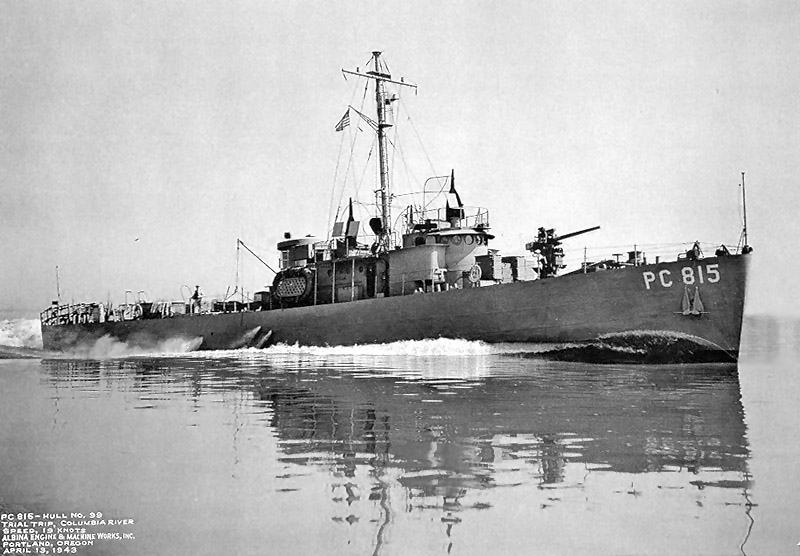
Hubbard's first command was a yard patrol boat in Massachusetts (top), while his second was a West Coast sub-chaser (bottom). In both cases, Hubbard was relieved of command.

In June 1942, Hubbard was given command of a patrol boat at the Boston Navy Yard, but he was relieved after the yard commandant wrote that Hubbard was "not temperamentally fitted for independent command". In 1943, Hubbard was given command of a submarine chaser, but only five hours into the shakedown cruise, Hubbard believed he had detected an enemy submarine. Hubbard and crew spent the next 68 hours engaged in combat. An investigation concluded that Hubbard had likely mistaken a "known magnetic deposit" for an enemy sub. The following month, Hubbard unwittingly fired upon Mexican territory and was relieved of command. In 1944, Hubbard served aboard the USS Algol before being transferred. The night before his departure, Hubbard reported the discovery of an attempted sabotage.

In June 1942, Navy records indicate that Hubbard suffered "active conjunctivitis" and later "urethral discharges". (Note: Owen argues that Hubbard likely suffered from venereal disease, writing: "Sulfa drugs were used in treatment but in excess could cause bloody urine, something which Hubbard's shipmate Thomas Moulton saw him passing on at least one occasion. Hubbard himself later complained about the amount of sulfa he had been fed in the Navy. Former Scientology spokesman Robert Vaughn Young claims that Hubbard's private papers refer to him having caught gonorrhoea from a girlfriend named Fern, which forced him to secretly take sulfa.") After being relieved of command of the sub-chaser, Hubbard began reporting sick, citing a variety of ailments, including ulcers, malaria, and back pains. In July 1943, Hubbard was admitted to the San Diego naval hospital for observation—he would remain there for months. Years later, Hubbard would privately write to himself: "Your stomach trouble you used as an excuse to keep the Navy from punishing you." On April 9, 1945, Hubbard again reported sick and was re-admitted to Oak Knoll Naval Hospital, Oakland. He was discharged from the hospital on December 4, 1945.

==== After the war ====
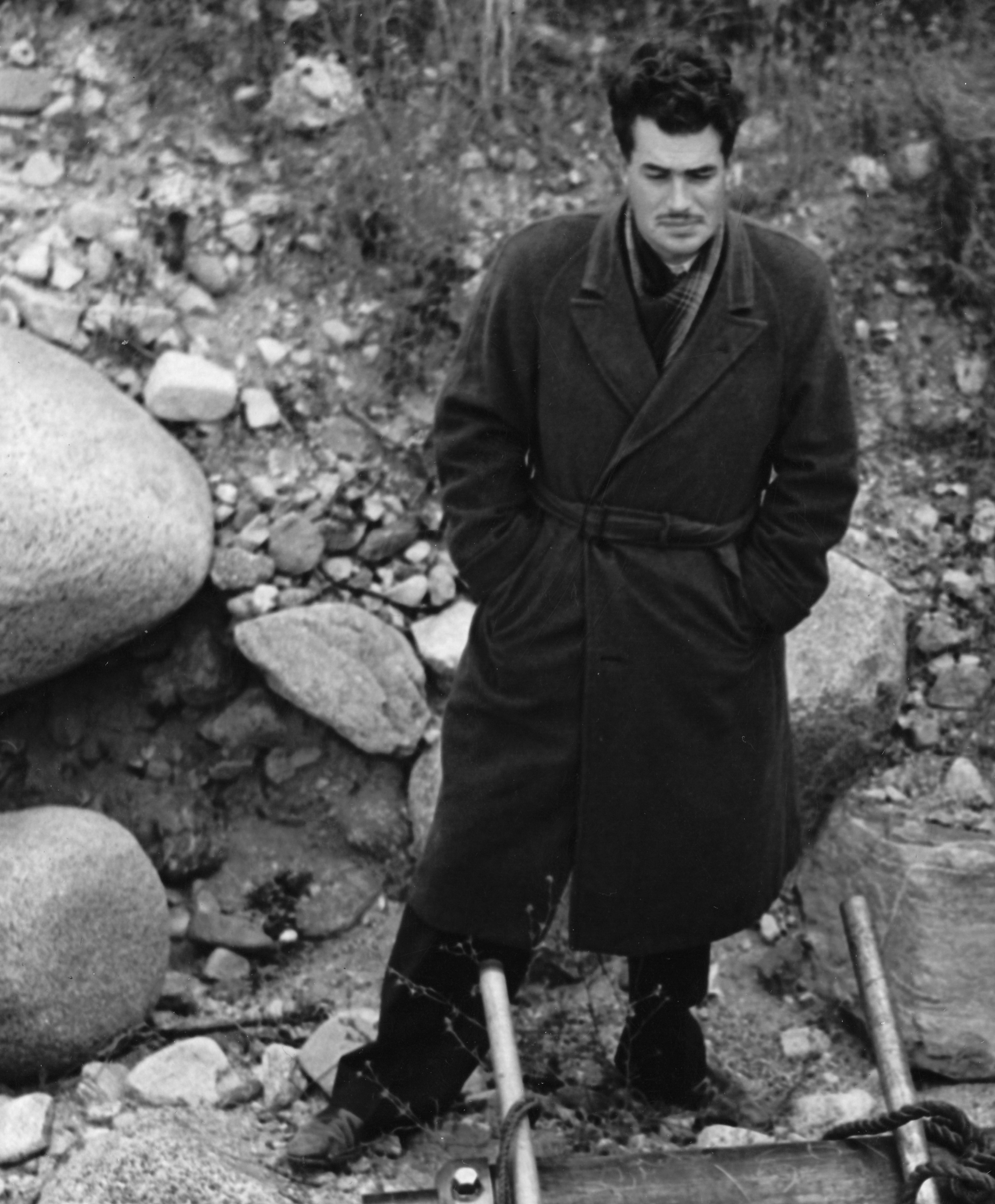
Parsons in 1943

After Hubbard chose to stay in California rather than return to his family in Washington state, he moved into the Pasadena mansion of John "Jack" Whiteside Parsons, a rocket propulsion engineer and a leading follower of the English occultist Aleister Crowley. Hubbard befriended Parsons and soon became sexually involved with Parsons's 21-year-old girlfriend, Sara "Betty" Northrup. Hubbard and Parsons collaborated on "Babalon Working", a series of sex magic rituals intended to summon an incarnation of Babalon, the supreme Goddess in Crowley's pantheon. According to religious studies scholar Hugh Urban, Parsons' own account of the period, The Book of Babalon, describes the workings as occult ceremonies based on Crowley's teaching, requiring a woman to take part in sexual rites meant to bring about the birth of a spiritual being sometimes described in Thelemic literature as a "moonchild" – a supernatural offspring "mightier than all the kings of the Earth". Parsons viewed Hubbard as being unusually sensitive to occult forces and brought him into the project as an active collaborator. He assigned Hubbard the role of "Scribe", responsible for channelling messages attributed to Babalon. One ritual account from March 1946 describes Hubbard speaking in the goddess's voice, portraying her as the "flame of life, power of darkness" who "feeds upon the death of men". In 1969, the Church of Scientology acknowledged that these rites had occurred and claimed that Hubbard's involvement had been an effort to rescue Betty.

During this period, Hubbard authored a document which has been called the "Affirmations", a series of statements relating to various physical, sexual, psychological and social issues that he was encountering in his life. The Affirmations appear to have been intended to be used as a form of self-hypnosis with the intention of resolving the author's psychological problems and instilling a positive mental attitude.

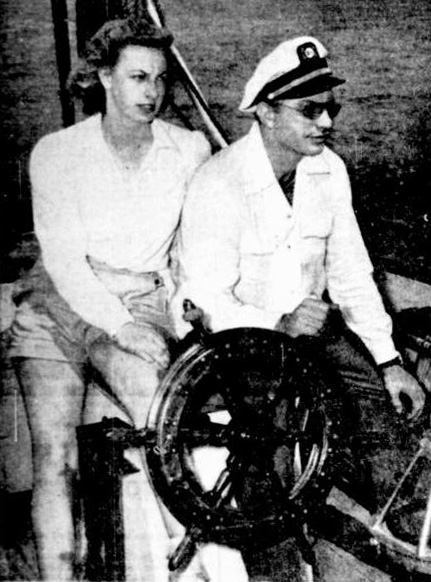
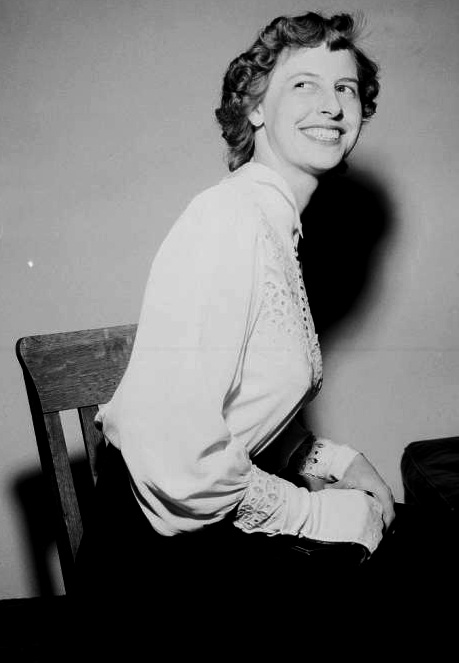
Hubbard and Northrup aboard the schooner Blue Water II in June 1946 (left). The Church of Scientology has republished this photograph with Northrup (pictured right) airbrushed out.

Parsons, Hubbard and Sara invested nearly their entire savings — the vast majority contributed by Parsons and Sara — in a plan for Hubbard and Sara to buy yachts on the East Coast and sail them to the West Coast to sell. Hubbard had a different idea, writing to the U.S. Navy requesting permission to undertake a world cruise. Parsons attempted to recover his money by obtaining an injunction to prevent Hubbard and Sara leaving the country or disposing of the remnants of his assets, but ultimately only received a $2,900 promissory note from Hubbard. Parsons returned home "shattered" and was forced to sell his mansion.

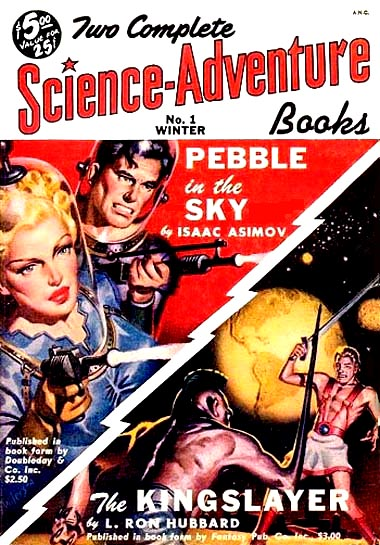
Hubbard's novella "The Kingslayer" was reprinted in Two Complete Science-Adventure Books in 1950 after its original publication in a 1949 Hubbard collection.

On August 10, 1946, Hubbard married Sara, though he was still married to his first wife Polly. Hubbard resumed his fiction writing to supplement his small disability allowance. In August 1947, Hubbard returned to the pages of Astounding with a serialized novel "The End is Not Yet", about a young nuclear physicist who tries to stop a world takeover by building a new philosophical system. In October 1947, the magazine began serializing Ole Doc Methuselah, the first in a series about the "Soldiers of Light", supremely skilled, extremely long-lived physicians. In February and March 1950, Campbell's Astounding serialized the Hubbard novel To the Stars about a young engineer on an interstellar trading starship who learns that months aboard ship amounts to centuries on Earth, making the ship his only remaining home after his first voyage. During his time in California, Hubbard began acting as a sort of amateur stage hypnotist or "swami".

Hubbard repeatedly wrote to the Veterans Administration (VA) asking for an increase in his war pension. Finally, in October 1947, he wrote to request psychiatric treatment:

After trying and failing for two years to regain my equilibrium in civil life, I am utterly unable to approach anything like my own competence. My last physician informed me that it might be very helpful if I were to be examined and perhaps treated psychiatrically or even by a psychoanalyst. Toward the end of my service I avoided out of pride any mental examinations, hoping that time would balance a mind which I had every reason to suppose was seriously affected. I cannot account for nor rise above long periods of moroseness and suicidal inclinations, and have newly come to realize that I must first triumph above this before I can hope to rehabilitate myself at all. ... I cannot, myself, afford such treatment.
Would you please help me?

The VA eventually did increase his pension, but his money problems continued. In the summer of 1948, Hubbard was arrested by the San Luis Obispo sheriff on a charge of petty theft for passing a fraudulent check. Beginning in June 1948, the nationally-syndicated wire service United Press ran a story on an American Legion-sponsored psychiatric ward in Savannah, Georgia, which sought to keep mentally-ill war veterans out of jail. In late 1948, Hubbard and his second wife Sara moved from California to Savannah, Georgia, where he would later claim to have worked as a volunteer in a psychiatric clinic. Hubbard claimed he had "processed an awful lot of Negroes" and wrote of having observed a psychiatrist using the threat of institutionalization in a state hospital to solicit funds from a patient's husband. In letters to friends sent from Savannah, Hubbard began to make the first public mentions of what was to become Dianetics.

=== In the Dianetics era ===
Inspired by the science fiction of his friend Robert Heinlein, Hubbard announced plans to write a book which would claim to "make supermen". Hubbard announced to the public that there existed a superhuman condition which he called the state of "Clear". He claimed people in that state would have a perfectly functioning mind with an improved intelligence quotient (IQ) and photographic memory. The "Clear" would be cured of physical ailments ranging from poor eyesight to the common cold, which Hubbard asserted were purely psychosomatic.

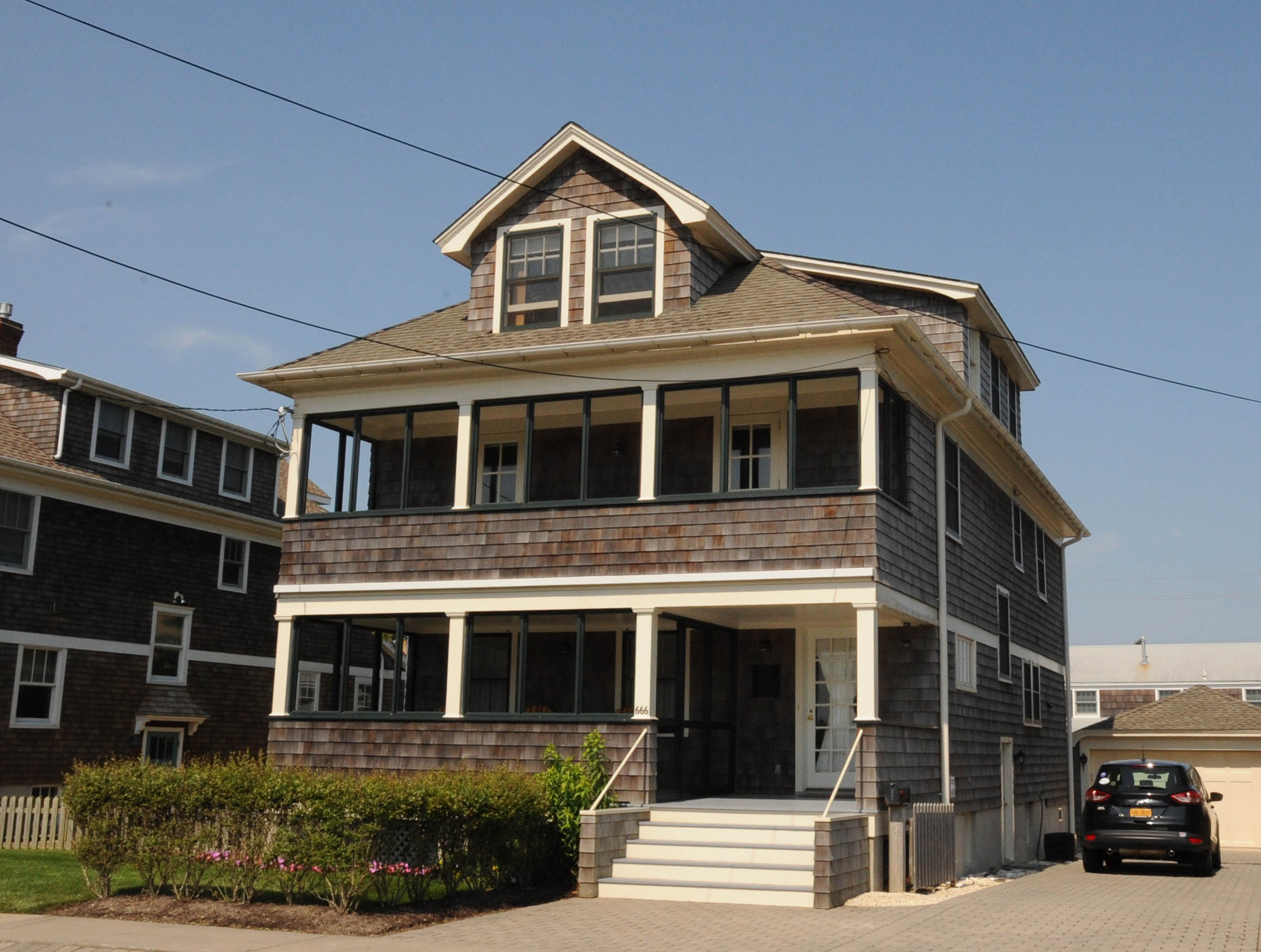
Hubbard and Sara moved into a house at 666 East Avenue in New Jersey when writing Dianetics. The Church of Scientology has set up the house as a museum. Hubbard's son Nibs later claimed the number '666' had special significance for his father.

To promote his upcoming book, Hubbard enlisted his longtime-editor John Campbell, who had a fascination with fringe psychologies and psychic powers. Campbell invited Hubbard and Sara to move into a New Jersey cottage. Campbell, in turn, recruited an acquaintance, medical doctor Joseph Winter, to help promote the book. Campbell wrote Winter to extol Hubbard, claiming that Hubbard had worked with nearly 1000 cases and cured every single one. The birth of Hubbard's second daughter Alexis Valerie, delivered by Winter on March 8, 1950, came in the middle of the preparations to launch Dianetics.

The basic content of Dianetics was a pseudoscientific retelling of psychoanalytic theory geared for a mass market English-speaking audience. Like Freud, Hubbard wrote that the brain recorded memories (for Hubbard, "engrams") which were stored in the unconscious mind (which Hubbard restyled "the reactive mind"). Past memories could be triggered later in life, causing psychological, emotional, or even physical problems. By sharing their memories with a friendly listener (or "auditor"), a person could overcome their past pain and thus cure themselves. Through Dianetics, Hubbard claimed that most illnesses were psychosomatic and caused by engrams, including arthritis, dermatitis, allergies, asthma, coronary difficulties, eye trouble, bursitis, ulcers, sinusitis and migraine headaches. He further claimed that dianetic therapy could treat these illnesses, and also included cancer and diabetes as conditions that Dianetic research was focused on.

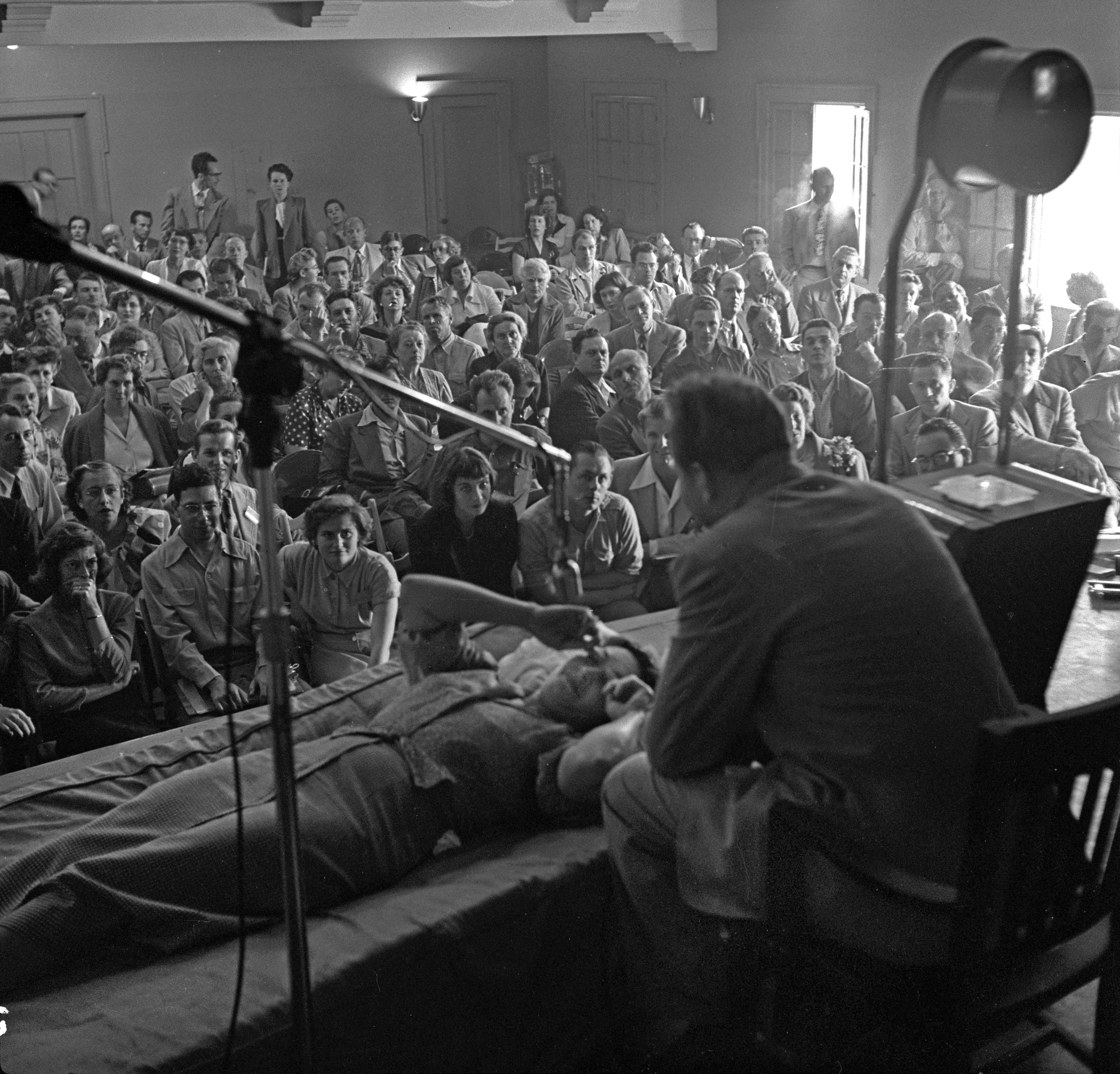
Hubbard conducting a Dianetics seminar in Los Angeles in 1950

Accompanied by an article in Astounding's May 1950 issue, the pseudoscientific book Dianetics: The Modern Science of Mental Health was released on May 9. Although Dianetics was poorly received by the press and the scientific and medical professions, the book was an immediate commercial success and sparked "a nationwide cult of incredible proportions". Five hundred Dianetic auditing groups were set up across the United States, and Hubbard established the "Hubbard Dianetic Research Foundation". Financial controls were lax, and Hubbard himself took large sums with no explanation of what he was doing with it.

Dianetics lost public credibility on August 10 when a presentation by Hubbard before an audience of 6,000 at the Shrine Auditorium in Los Angeles failed disastrously. He introduced a woman named Sonya Bianca and told the audience that as a result of undergoing Dianetic therapy she now possessed perfect recall, only for her to forget the color of Hubbard's necktie. A large part of the audience walked out, and the debacle was publicized by popular science writer Martin Gardner. On September 3, psychologist Erich Fromm publicly derided Dianetics as a "mixture of some oversimplified truths, half truths and plain absurdities"; Fromm criticized the writing as "propagandistic" and likened it to the quack field of patent medicines. By late-1950, Hubbard's foundations were in financial crisis. Hubbard's publisher Arthur Ceppos, his longtime promoter John Campbell, and medical doctor-turned-Dianetics endorser Joseph Winter all resigned under acrimonious circumstances.

In late-1950, Hubbard began an affair with employee Barbara Klowden, prompting Sara to start her own affair with Miles Hollister. On February 23, 1951, Sara and her lover consulted with a psychiatrist about Hubbard, who advised that Sara was in grave danger and Hubbard should be institutionalized. The trio telephoned Jack Maloney, the head of the Hubbard's foundation in Elizabeth, New Jersey, to request funding for the hospitalization. Maloney informed Hubbard of the plans to institutionalize him. That night, Hubbard and two trusted aides kidnapped Hubbard's one-year-old daughter Alexis and wife Sara and attempted unsuccessfully to find a doctor to examine Sara and declare her insane. He let Sara go but took Alexis to Cuba. Hubbard denounced Sara and her lover to the FBI, portraying them in a letter as communist infiltrators. An agent annotated his correspondence with Hubbard with the comment, "Appears mental".

On April 12, Sara's story was published in the press, leading to headlines such as "Ron Hubbard Insane, Says His Wife". Hubbard's first wife evidently saw the headlines and wrote to Sara on May 2 offering her support. "Ron is not normal... Your charges probably sound fantastic to the average person—but I've been through it—the beatings, threats on my life, all the sadistic traits you charge—twelve years of it." In June, Sara finally secured the return of her daughter by agreeing to a settlement in which she signed a statement, written by Hubbard, declaring that she had been misrepresented in the press and that she had always believed he was a "fine and brilliant man".

During the Dianetics and Scientology era, Hubbard regularly relocated across the country, living in Elizabeth, New Jersey (1950); Los Angeles (1950–51), Wichita (1951–52), Phoenix (1952–53), Philadelphia (December 1952), Camden, New Jersey (1953–55); and D.C. (1955–59). In 1959, after losing tax-exemption in the US, Hubbard relocated to England.

The Dianetics craze "burned itself out as quickly as it caught fire", and the movement appeared to be on the edge of total collapse. However, it was temporarily saved by Don Purcell, a millionaire who agreed to support a new Foundation in Wichita, Kansas. In August 1951, Hubbard published Science of Survival. In that book, Hubbard introduced such concepts as the immortal soul (or "Thetan") and past-life regressions (or "Whole Track Auditing"). The Wichita Foundation underwrote the costs of printing the book, but it recorded poor sales when first published, with only 1,250 copies of the first edition being printed. The Wichita Foundation became financially nonviable after a court ruled that it was liable for the unpaid debts of its defunct predecessor in Elizabeth, New Jersey. The ruling prompted Purcell and the other directors of the Wichita Foundation to file for voluntary bankruptcy in February 1952. Hubbard resigned immediately and accused Purcell of having been bribed by the American Medical Association to destroy Dianetics. Hubbard emptied the Wichita foundation's bank accounts, in part through forgery.

=== Pivot to Scientology ===
Having lost the rights to Dianetics, Hubbard created Scientology. At a convention in Wichita, Hubbard announced that he had discovered a new science beyond Dianetics which he called "Scientology". Whereas the goal of Dianetics had been to reach a superhuman state of "Clear", Scientology promised a chance to achieve god-like powers in a state called Operating Thetan. Hubbard introduced a device called an "electropsychometer" (or e-meter), which called for users to hold two metal cans (Note: Initially, the user held emptied soup or juice cans with the paper labels removed. Later versions of electrodes had abandoned food cans, however Hubbard continued to use the term "cans" to refer to the handheld metal electrodes.) in their hands to measure changes in skin conductivity due to variance in sweat or grip. In 1906, Swiss psychoanalyst Carl Jung had famously used such a device in a study of word association. Rather than a mundane biofeedback device, Hubbard presented the e-meter as having "an almost mystical power to reveal an individual's innermost thoughts".

Mary Sue Hubbard in 1957

Hubbard married a staff member, 20-year-old Mary Sue Whipp, and the pair moved to Phoenix, Arizona. Hubbard was joined by his 18-year-old son Nibs, who had become a Scientology staff member and "professor". Scientology was organized in a different way from the decentralized Dianetics movement — The Hubbard Association of Scientologists (HAS) was the only official Scientology organization. Branches or "orgs" were organized as franchises, rather like a fast food restaurant chain. Each franchise holder was required to pay ten percent of income to Hubbard's central organization. In July, Hubbard published "What to Audit" (later re-titled Scientology: A History of Man), which taught everyone has subconscious traumatic memories of their past lives as clams, sloths, and cavemen which cause neuroses and health problems. In November 1952, Hubbard published Scientology 8-80, followed up in December with Scientology 8-8008, which argued that the physical universe is the creation of the mind.

"I'm going to send him back a letter. Uh... so... uh... you say you have some connection with the Prince of Darkness out there and you're very worried about this.
Who do you think I am?"

— Hubbard in December 1952.

In December, Hubbard gave a seventy-hour series of lectures in Philadelphia that was attended by 38 people in which he delved into the occult. In the lectures, Hubbard connects rituals and the practice of Scientology to the magickal practices of Aleister Crowley, recommending Crowley's book The Master Therion. During the Philadelphia course, Hubbard joked that he was "the prince of darkness", which was met with laughter from the audience. On December 16, 1952, Hubbard was arrested in the middle of a lecture for failing to return $9,000 withdrawn from the Wichita Foundation. He eventually settled the debt by paying $1,000 and returning a car belonging to Wichita financier Don Purcell.

In April 1953, Hubbard proposed setting up a chain of "Spiritual Guidance Centers" as part of what he called "the religion angle". On December 18, 1953, Hubbard incorporated the Church of Scientology in Camden, New Jersey. The religious transformation was explained as a way to protect Scientologists from charges of practicing medicine without a license. The idea may not have been new; Hubbard has been quoted as telling a science fiction convention in 1948: "Writing for a penny a word is ridiculous. If a man really wants to make a million dollars, the best way would be to start his own religion."

=== In the Church of Scientology era ===
By 1954, the IRS recognized the Church of Scientology of California as a tax-exempt organization and by 1966, the Washington, D.C. Founding Church of Scientology received tax-exempt status nationwide. The Church of Scientology became a highly profitable enterprise for Hubbard, as he was paid a percentage of the Church's gross income. By 1957 he was being paid about $250,000 per year (equivalent to $2.87 million in 2025). His family grew, too, with Mary Sue giving birth to three more children—Quentin on January 6, 1954; Suzette on February 13, 1955; and Arthur on June 6, 1958.

"The purpose of the suit is to harass and discourage rather than to win. The law can be used very easily to harass"

— L. Ron Hubbard

Hubbard was notorious for his policies of attacking his perceived enemies. Nibs recalled that Hubbard "only knew how to do one thing and that was to destroy people." Hubbard told Scientologists to "Don't ever defend, always attack", encouraging them to find or manufacture evidence and to file harassing lawsuits against enemies. Any individual breaking away from Scientology and setting up his own group was to be shut down. Most of the formerly independent Scientology and Dianetics groups were either driven out of business or were absorbed into Hubbard's organizations. Hubbard finally achieved victory over Don Purcell in 1954 when the latter, worn out by constant litigation, handed the copyrights of Dianetics back to Hubbard.

After dealing with Purcell, Hubbard turned his attention to attacking psychiatrists, who he blamed for the backlash against Dianetics and Scientology. In 1955, Hubbard authored a text titled: Brain-Washing: A Synthesis of the Russian Textbook on Psychopolitics which purported to be a secret manual linking Psychiatry and Communism written by a Soviet secret police chief. Hubbard founded the "National Academy of American Psychology" which sought to issue a "loyalty oath" to psychologists and psychiatrists. Those who opposed the oath were to be labeled "Subversive psychiatrists", while those who merely refused to sign the oath would be labeled "Potentially Subversive". Hubbard denounced psychiatric abuses, writing that psychoanalysis had been "superseded by tyrannous sadism, practiced by unprincipled men". Wrote Hubbard:

Today men who call themselves analysts are merrily sawing out patients' brains, shocking them with murderous drugs, striking them with high voltages, burying them underneath mounds of ice, placing them in restraints, 'sterilizing' them sexually and generally conducting themselves much as their patients would were they given the chance.

In 1956, Hubbard released Fundamentals of Thought, which teaches that life is a game and divides people into pieces, players, and game-makers. The following year, Hubbard published All About Radiation, which falsely claimed that radiation poisoning and even cancer can be cured by vitamins. In 1958, amid widespread interest in the Bridey Murphy case, Hubbard authored Have You Lived Before This Life?, a collection of past life regressions.

In 1958, the U.S. Internal Revenue Service withdrew the Washington, D.C., Church of Scientology's tax exemption after it found that Hubbard and his family were profiting unreasonably from Scientology's ostensibly non-profit income. In the spring of 1959, Hubbard purchased Saint Hill Manor, an 18th-century English country house formerly owned by the Maharaja of Jaipur. The house became Hubbard's permanent residence and an international training center for Scientologists.

That year Hubbard learned his son Nibs had resigned from the organization, citing financial difficulties. Hubbard regarded the departure as a betrayal. Hubbard introduced "security checking", a structured interrogation using the e-meter, to identify those he termed "potential trouble sources" and "suppressive persons". Members of the Church of Scientology were interrogated with the aid of E-meters and were asked questions such as "Have you ever practiced homosexuality?" and "Have you ever had unkind thoughts about L. Ron Hubbard?"

Since its inception, Hubbard marketed Dianetics and Scientology through false medical claims. On January 4, 1963, US Food and Drug Administration agents raided American offices of the Church of Scientology, seizing over a hundred E-meters as illegal medical devices, thousands of pills being marketed as "radiation cures", and tons of literature that they accused of making false medical claims. In November 1963 Victoria, Australia, the government opened an inquiry into the Church, which was accused of brainwashing, blackmail, extortion and damaging the mental health of its members. Its report, published in October 1965, condemned every aspect of Scientology and Hubbard himself. The report led to Scientology being banned in Victoria, Western Australia and South Australia, and led to more negative publicity around the world. Public perceptions of Scientology changed from "relatively harmless, if cranky" to an "evil, dangerous" group that performs hypnosis and brainwashing. Scientology attracted increasingly unfavorable publicity across the English-speaking world.

Hubbard took major new initiatives in the face of these challenges. By 1965, "Ethics Technology" was introduced to tighten internal discipline within Scientology. It required Scientologists to "disconnect" from any organization or individual—including family members—deemed to be disruptive or "suppressive". Scientologists were also required to write "Knowledge Reports" on each other, reporting transgressions or misapplications of Scientology methods. Hubbard promulgated a long list of punishable "Misdemeanors", "Crimes", and "High Crimes". At the start of March 1966, Hubbard created the Guardian's Office (GO), a new agency within the Church of Scientology that was headed by his wife Mary Sue. It dealt with Scientology's external affairs, including public relations, legal actions and the gathering of intelligence on perceived threats. As Scientology faced increasingly negative media attention, the GO retaliated with hundreds of writs for libel and slander; it issued more than forty on a single day. Hubbard ordered his staff to find "lurid, blood sex crime actual evidence [sic] on [Scientology's] attackers". The "fair game" policy was codified in 1967, which was applicable to anyone deemed an "enemy" of Scientology: "May be deprived of property or injured by any means by any Scientologist without any discipline of the Scientologist. May be tricked, sued or lied to or destroyed."

External videos
- L. Ron Hubbard Interview in Rhodesia, May 1966

Newspapers and politicians in the UK pressed the British government for action against Scientology. In April 1966, hoping to form a remote "safe haven" for Scientology, Hubbard traveled to the southern African country Rhodesia (now Zimbabwe). Despite his attempts to curry favor with the local government, Rhodesia promptly refused to renew Hubbard's visa, compelling him to leave the country. Finally, at the end of 1966, Hubbard acquired his own fleet of three ships. In July 1968, the British Minister of Health announced that foreign Scientologists would no longer be permitted to enter the UK and Hubbard himself was excluded from the country as an "undesirable alien". Further inquiries were launched in Canada, New Zealand and South Africa.

=== In the Sea Org era ===
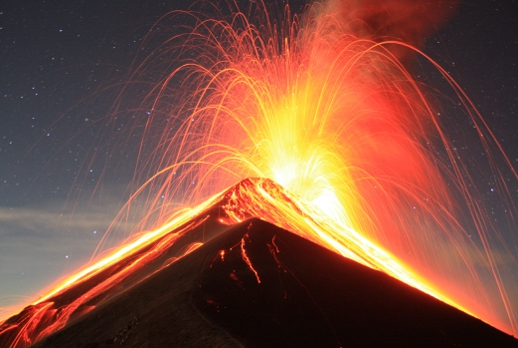
Enroute to the volcanic island of Las Palmas, Hubbard wrote "OT III: The Wall of Fire", about the evil lord Xenu who uses hydrogen bombs and volcanoes to murder his enemies and imprison their souls on Earth. Beginning in 1967, new editions of Dianetics featured a volcano on the cover.

Hubbard purchased a ship in Las Palmas and founded the "Sea Org", a private navy of elite Scientologists. Hubbard set out to take command of the ship. Enroute, he wrote OT III, the esoteric story of Xenu. In a letter to his wife Mary Sue, Hubbard said that, in order to assist his research, he was drinking alcohol and taking stimulants and depressants. In OT III, Hubbard wrote of alleged secrets of an immense disaster that had occurred "on this planet, and on the other seventy-five planets which form this Confederacy, seventy-five million years ago". It teaches that Xenu, the leader of the Galactic Confederacy, had shipped billions of people to Earth and blown them up with hydrogen bombs, following which their traumatized spirits were stuck together at "implant stations", brainwashed with false memories and eventually became contained within human beings.

When Hubbard established the Sea Org he publicly declared that he had relinquished his management responsibilities over the Church of Scientology. In fact, he received daily telex messages from Scientology organizations around the world reporting their statistics and income. The Church of Scientology sent him $15,000 a week (equivalent to $132,000 in 2025) along with millions of dollars that were transferred to bank accounts. Church of Scientology couriers arrived regularly, conveying luxury food for Hubbard and his family or cash that had been smuggled from England to avoid currency export restrictions. Hubbard's fleet began sailing from port to port in the Mediterranean Sea and eastern North Atlantic, rarely staying anywhere for longer than six weeks, as Hubbard claimed he was being pursued by enemies whose interference could lead to global chaos or nuclear war.

External videos
- "The Shrinking World of L. Ron Hubbard", 1967 interview with Hubbard

Though Scientologists around the world were presented with a glamorous picture of life in the Sea Org and many applied to join Hubbard aboard the fleet, the reality was rather different. Most of those joining had no nautical experience at all. Mechanical difficulties and blunders by the crews led to a series of embarrassing incidents and near-disasters. Following one incident in which the rudder of the Royal Scotman was damaged during a storm, Hubbard ordered the ship's entire crew to be reduced to a "condition of liability" and wear gray rags tied to their arms. The ship itself was treated the same way, with dirty tarpaulins tied around its funnel to symbolize its lower status. According to those aboard, conditions were appalling; the crew was worked to the point of exhaustion, given meager rations and forbidden to wash or change their clothes for several weeks. Hubbard maintained a harsh disciplinary regime aboard the fleet, punishing mistakes by confining people in the Royal Scotman's bilge tanks without toilet facilities and with food provided in buckets. At other times erring crew members or students were thrown overboard with Hubbard looking on and, occasionally, filming. One member of the Sea Org recalled Hubbard punishing a little boy by confining him to the ship's chain locker.

Aboard ship, Hubbard began dispatching teams of Sea Org members to search for historic evidence of his past lives; In 1973, he published Mission into Time about those searches. Now having his own paramilitary force, orders to use R2-45 (killing someone with a .45 pistol) on specific individuals were published. From about 1970, Hubbard was attended aboard ship by the children of Sea Org members, organized as the Commodore's Messenger Organization (CMO). They were mainly young girls dressed in hot pants and halter tops, who were responsible for running errands for Hubbard such as lighting his cigarettes, dressing him or relaying his verbal commands to other members of the crew. In addition to his wife Mary Sue, he was accompanied by all four of his children by her, who were all members of the Sea Org and shared its rigors.

After his prior failure in Rhodesia, Hubbard again tried to establish a safe haven in a friendly country, this time Greece. The fleet stayed at the Greek island of Corfu for several months in 1968–1969. Hubbard, recently expelled from Britain, renamed the ships after Greek gods—the Royal Scotman was rechristened Apollo—and he praised the recently established military dictatorship. Despite Hubbard's hopes, in March 1969 Hubbard and his ships were ordered to leave.

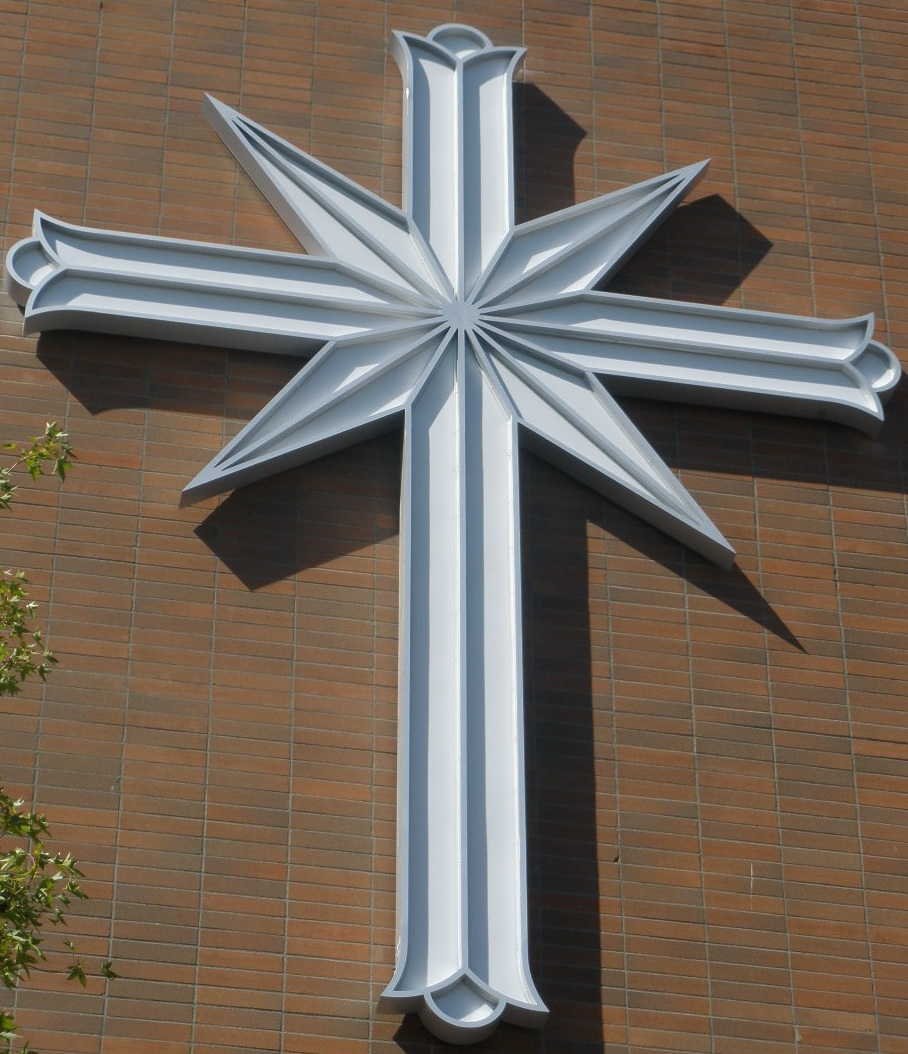
The Scientology cross came into use in 1969. Given Hubbard's private affinity for Crowley and antipathy to Christianity; it has been suggested that the cross may have been inspired by Crowley's Rose Cross or might be a "crossed-out cross" (an anti-Christian symbol).

The practice of prominently displaying the cross in Scientology centers was instituted in 1969 following hostile press coverage where Scientology's status as a legitimate religion was being questioned. In October 1969, The Sunday Times published an exposé by Australian journalist Alex Mitchell detailing Hubbard's occult experiences with Parsons and Aleister Crowley's teachings. The Church responded with a statement, claiming without evidence Hubbard was sent in by the US Government to "break up Black Magic in America" and succeeded.

In mid-1972, Hubbard again tried to find a safe haven, this time in Morocco, establishing contacts with the country's secret police and training senior policemen and intelligence agents in techniques for detecting subversives. The program ended in failure when it became caught up in internal Moroccan politics, and Hubbard left the country hastily in December 1972. After French prosecutors charged Hubbard with fraud and customs violations, Hubbard risked extradition to France. In response, at the end of 1972, Hubbard left the Sea Org fleet temporarily, living incognito in Queens, New York. Hubbard's health deteriorated significantly during this period, as he was an overweight chain-smoker, suffered from bursitis and had a prominent growth on his forehead. In September 1973 when the threat of extradition had abated, Hubbard left New York, returning to his flagship.

Hubbard suffered serious injuries in a motorcycle accident on the island of Tenerife in December 1973. In 1974, Hubbard established the Rehabilitation Project Force, a punishment program for Sea Org members who displeased him. Hubbard's son Quentin reportedly found it difficult to adjust and attempted suicide in mid-1974. Also in 1974, L. Ron Hubbard confessed to two top executives that "People do not [leave Scientology] because of [their unconfessed sins], they leave because [they stop liking Scientology or stop believing in it]". Hubbard warned "If any of this information ever became public, I would lose all control of the orgs and eventually Scientology as a whole."

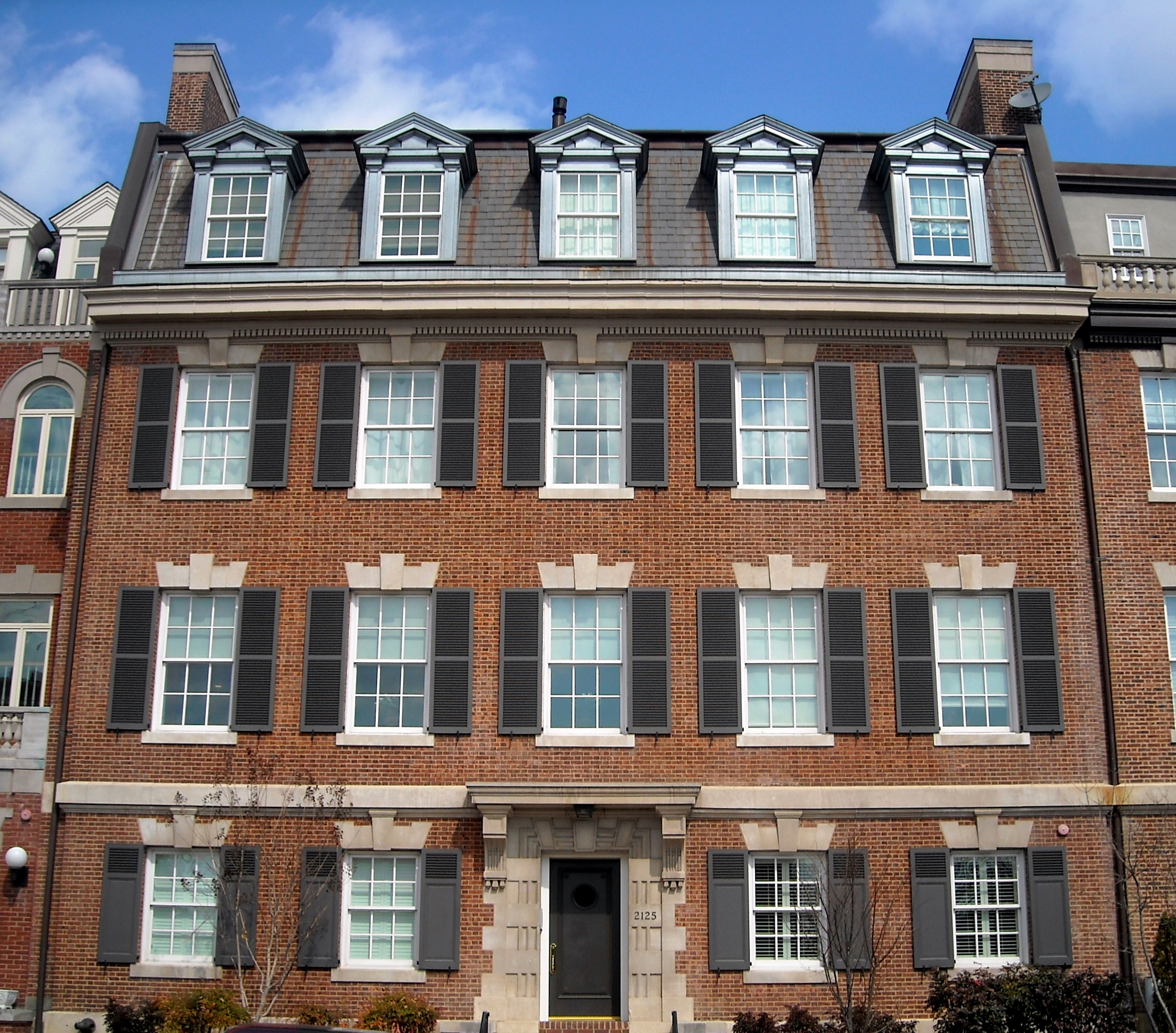
On July 8, 1977, after uncovering Operation Snow White, the FBI raided the Founding Church of Scientology in D.C. and seized thousands of documents revealing the scope of the Church's espionage operations.

Throughout this period, Hubbard was heavily involved in directing the activities of the Guardian's Office (GO), the legal bureau/intelligence agency. In 1973, he instigated the "Snow White Program" and directed the GO to remove negative reports about Scientology from government files and track down their sources. The GO carried out covert campaigns on his behalf such as Operation Bulldozer Leak, designed to convince authorities that Hubbard had no legal liability for the actions of the church. Hubbard was kept informed of these operations, including as the theft of medical records from a hospital, harassment of psychiatrists, and infiltrations of organizations such as the Better Business Bureau, American Medical Association, American Psychiatric Association, U.S. Department of Justice, and Internal Revenue Service. Paulette Cooper, a freelance journalist and Scientology critic, was subjected to at least 19 lawsuits, framed for sending bomb threats, and was urged to climb onto a dangerous 33rd-floor ledge by a roommate later believed to be a Guardian's Office agent.

=== In hiding ===
In his final decade, Hubbard hid throughout the United States, moving from Florida to D.C., then to Southern California.
Multiple locations where Hubbard was in hiding in Southern California

After suffering a heart attack, Hubbard decided to relocate back to the United States. In October 1975, Hubbard moved into a hotel suite in Daytona Beach while the Fort Harrison Hotel in Clearwater, Florida, was secretly acquired as the location for the Sea Org "land base". According to a former member of the Sea Organization pseudonymously named "Heidi Forrester", in late 1975 she met with a man fitting Hubbard's description who apparently performed a Crowleyite sex magick ritual called Dianism using her.

On June 11, 1976, the FBI apprehended two Guardian's Office agents inside the US Courthouse in D.C., prompting Hubbard to move cross country to a safe house in California, and later a nearby ranch. On October 28, 1976, Las Vegas police discovered Hubbard's son Quentin Hubbard unconscious in his car with a hose connected to the tailpipe. L. Ron Hubbard was furious at the news, shouting, "That stupid fucking kid! Look what he's done to me!" Scientologists were told that Quentin had died from encephalitis.

On July 8, 1977, the FBI carried out simultaneous raids on Guardian's Office locations in Los Angeles and Washington, D.C. They retrieved wiretap equipment, burglary tools and some 90,000 pages of incriminating documents. On July 15, a week after the raid, Hubbard fled with Pat Broeker to Sparks, Nevada. On August 18, 1978, Hubbard suffered from a pulmonary embolism and fell into a coma, but recovered. Hubbard summoned his personal auditor, David Mayo, to heal him.

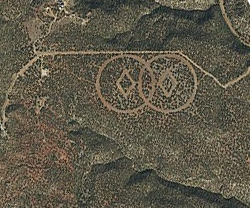
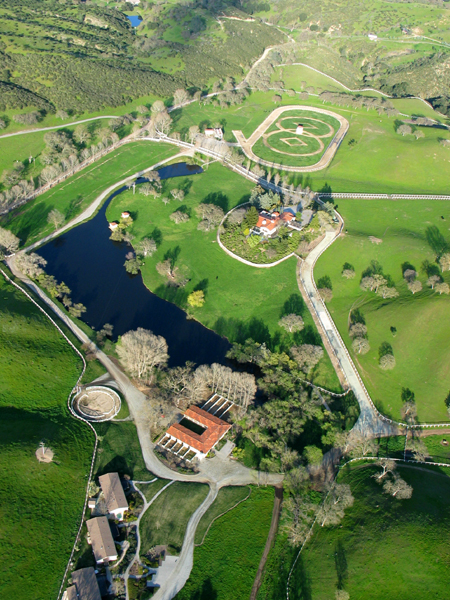
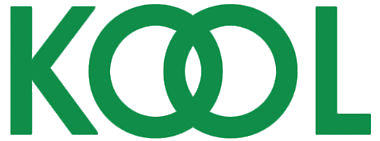
The distinctive logo designed by Hubbard has been constructed at Trementina (top) and at the ranch in Creston (middle) where Hubbard ultimately died. The logo is speculated to derive from the Kool cigarettes logo, Hubbard's preferred brand.

In August 1979, Hubbard saw his wife for the last time. Hubbard was facing a possible indictment for his role in Operation Freakout, a campaign of attacks against journalist Paulette Cooper. In February 1980, Hubbard disappeared into deep cover in the company of two trusted messengers, Pat and Annie Broeker. For the first few years of the 1980s, Hubbard and the Broekers toured the Pacific Northwest in a recreational vehicle, later residing in Southern California. Hubbard returned to science fiction, writing Battlefield Earth (1982) and Mission Earth, a ten-volume series published between 1985 and 1987.

In OT VIII, dated 1980, Hubbard explains the document is intended for circulation only after his death. In the document, Hubbard denounces the historic Jesus as "a lover of young boys" given to "uncontrollable bursts of temper". Hubbard explains that "My mission could be said to fulfill the Biblical promise represented by this brief anti-Christ period." This was corroborated by a 1983 interview where Hubbard's son Nibs explained that his father believed he was the Anti-Christ.

External videos
- Nibs Hubbard testimony Day 1 and Day 2
- Nibs Hubbard interviewed by Carol Randolph
- Jamie DeWolf reads grandfather Nibs's memoir

In December 1985, Hubbard allegedly attempted suicide by custom e-meter. On January 17, 1986, Hubbard suffered a stroke; he died a week later. His body was cremated and the ashes were scattered at sea.

== Sources and doctrines ==
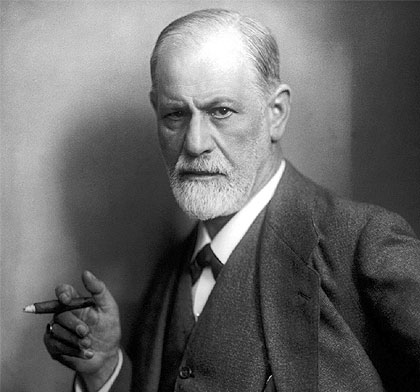
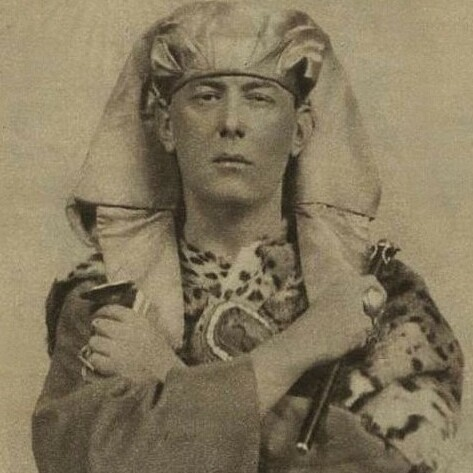
Hubbard drew upon a diverse set of teachings to create his doctrine, incorporating elements from the psychoanalysis of Sigmund Freud (top) and the occult teachings of Aleister Crowley (bottom) among many other sources.

Hubbard has been described as an "eclectic and ingenious" religious innovator who cobbled together ideas from a diverse array of sources and traditions. Hubbard explicitly cited Freud's psychoanalysis as a source for Dianetics and Scientology, renaming some terms. Hubbard's wife Sara recalled him discussing biologist Richard Semon, who had coined the term "engram" which became a centerpiece of Dianetics. Hubbard incorporated the 1920s psychoanalytic theory of birth trauma and taught his followers to maintain total silence during the birth process. Hubbard explicitly credited Social Darwinism pioneer Herbert Spencer who coined the phrase "survival of the fittest", and taught that the 'one command' given to all life is to "survive" and later authored a book called Science of Survival.

Hubbard cited author Alfred Korzybski as an influence; after two years observing patients at St. Elizabeths Hospital in D.C. in collaboration with superintendent William Alanson White, Korzybski published a tome titled Science and Sanity outlining a doctrine he called "General Semantics". After Korzybski founded an "Institute" to promote his teachings and began offering seminars, his ideas were incorporated into the science-fiction of Hubbard-associates Van Vogt and Heinlein, who envisioned futures where research into General Semantics had transformed some individuals into superhumans; Hubbard cited this fiction in a letter announcing the central principles of Dianetics: a book that promises to "make supermen".

Through his exposure to both psychoanalysts and occultists, Hubbard drew inspiration from Eastern religions. Hubbard cited psychiatrist Joseph Thompson as teaching him the adage "If it's not true for you, it's not true", a purportedly-Buddhist maxim which was later incorporated into Scientology. Reincarnation, originally a dharmic doctrine, entered Western occultism through the works of Blavatsky and numerous others. Fifteen years after Blavatsky followers unveiled "The Bridge to Freedom", Hubbard announced "The Bridge to Total Freedom".

Hubbard's son Nibs said that Aleister Crowley was his father's most important source of inspiration, and scholar Hugh Urban has written extensively about the occult roots of Scientology. Nibs Hubbard said in an interview in 1983:

What a lot of people don't realize is that Scientology is black magic that is just spread out over a long time period. To perform black magic generally takes a few hours or, at most, a few weeks. But in Scientology it's stretched out over a lifetime, and so you don't see it.

Like Crowley, Hubbard identified himself with diabolical figures from the Book of Revelation. Just as Aleister Crowley taught a soul could temporarily leave its body through astral projection, Hubbard taught a thetan could journey outside the body by "going exterior".

Hubbard also taught extensively about hypnosis and recommended a 1949 book on the subject. Hubbard told of hypnotic implants, privately teaching human religions are the product of such implants. The use of hypnosis or trance to remember past lives was an extant practice in occult circles prior to Dianetics. Hubbard incorporated a range of hypnotic techniques into Scientology auditing and courses. They are employed as a means to create dependency and obedience in his followers. Crowley and Hubbard both placed emphasis on a Goddess figure, variously called Babalon, Hathor, or Diana—a name Hubbard gave to a ship and a daughter; the term Dianetics may have been inspired by the Goddess. Crowley taught a sex magic ritual called karezza or Dianism which Hubbard is believed to have practiced.

The e-meter was constructed by inventor Volney Mathison, who introduced it to Hubbard. Similar devices had been in use by psychiatrists and law enforcement for decades. Hubbard likened his own teachings about interstellar empires and invader forces to the early 20th-century fiction genre Space Opera. Hubbard drew upon US Navy traditions in creating the Sea Org, and he once said the Commodore's Messenger Organization had been inspired by the Hitler Youth.

== Hubbard and psychiatry ==
Hubbard's views on psychiatry evolved over time.

Hubbard reported many encounters with psychiatrists from the age of 12 onward. Hubbard spoke positively of his childhood and teen encounters with psychiatrists in the 1920s and 30s. At the age of 12, Hubbard, his father, and his mother were accompanied by Navy psychiatrist Joseph Cheesman Thompson on an ocean trip from Seattle to Washington, D.C. Hubbard likewise wrote positively of teenage/young-adult encounters with D.C.-based psychiatrist William Alanson White. Some of Hubbard's later works included acknowledgements of both Thompson and White, and Hubbard would later claim to have received clinical training from both Thompson and White. In contrast, Hubbard spoke more critically of his later encounters with psychiatrists and psychiatric institutions. Although Hubbard had written positively of psychiatric hospital superintendent William Alanson White, White's successor Winfred Overholser was singled out for criticism. Hubbard likewise spoke critically of his encounters with a Washington, D.C., institution for the treatment of schizophrenia called "Walnut Lodge" (presumably Chestnut Lodge). :

there's a place by the name of Walnut Lodge. I... I... They don't see anything humorous in that, by the way; it's Walnut Lodge. [...] They... they... they sent three people to see, to... to see me and every one of them was under treatment. And this was their staff. But anyway, very good people there, I'm sure, didn't happen to meet any. Have some fine patients though. Anyway, they... they treat only schizophrenia. And so they take only schizophrenics. Now how do they get only schizophrenics? Well, anybody sent to Walnut Lodge is a classified schizophrenic. And they take somebody who is a dementia praecox unclassified or a more modern definition, a mania-depressive and they take him from Saint Elizabeth's and they take him over to Walnut Lodge and he goes onto the books as a schizophrenic. Why? Because Walnut Lodge takes only schizophrenics.

During the Second World War, Hubbard was hospitalized at Oak Knoll Military Hospital. In 1947, Hubbard wrote a letter to the VA requesting psychiatric treatment. The following year, Hubbard and his wife Sara moved to Savannah, Georgia, where Hubbard would later recall having been associated with a charity mental health clinic. According to Hubbard, he worked as a "lay analyst" or volunteer peer counselor, listening to charity patients during his time in Savannah. While in Savannah, Hubbard began working on a "book of psychology" about "the cause and cure of nervous tension"; the next year, he published Dianetics: The Modern Science of Mental Health.

In 1951, Hubbard's wife Sara reportedly consulted a psychiatrist who recommended Hubbard be institutionalized. Hubbard initially responded by kidnapping Sara. Thereafter, he took their daughter and fled to Havana. After Sara went public with her story, Hubbard returned her daughter. In his final known encounter with a psychiatrist, Hubbard consulted a practitioner in order to rebut public claims of his own mental illness.

Thereafter, Hubbard was increasingly hostile towards psychiatry. In the 50s, Hubbard sought to identify "Subversive" psychiatrists or other "Potential Subversives". By the early 70s, Hubbard wrote of having redefined the word "psychiatrist" to mean "an antisocial enemy of the people".

== False biographical claims ==
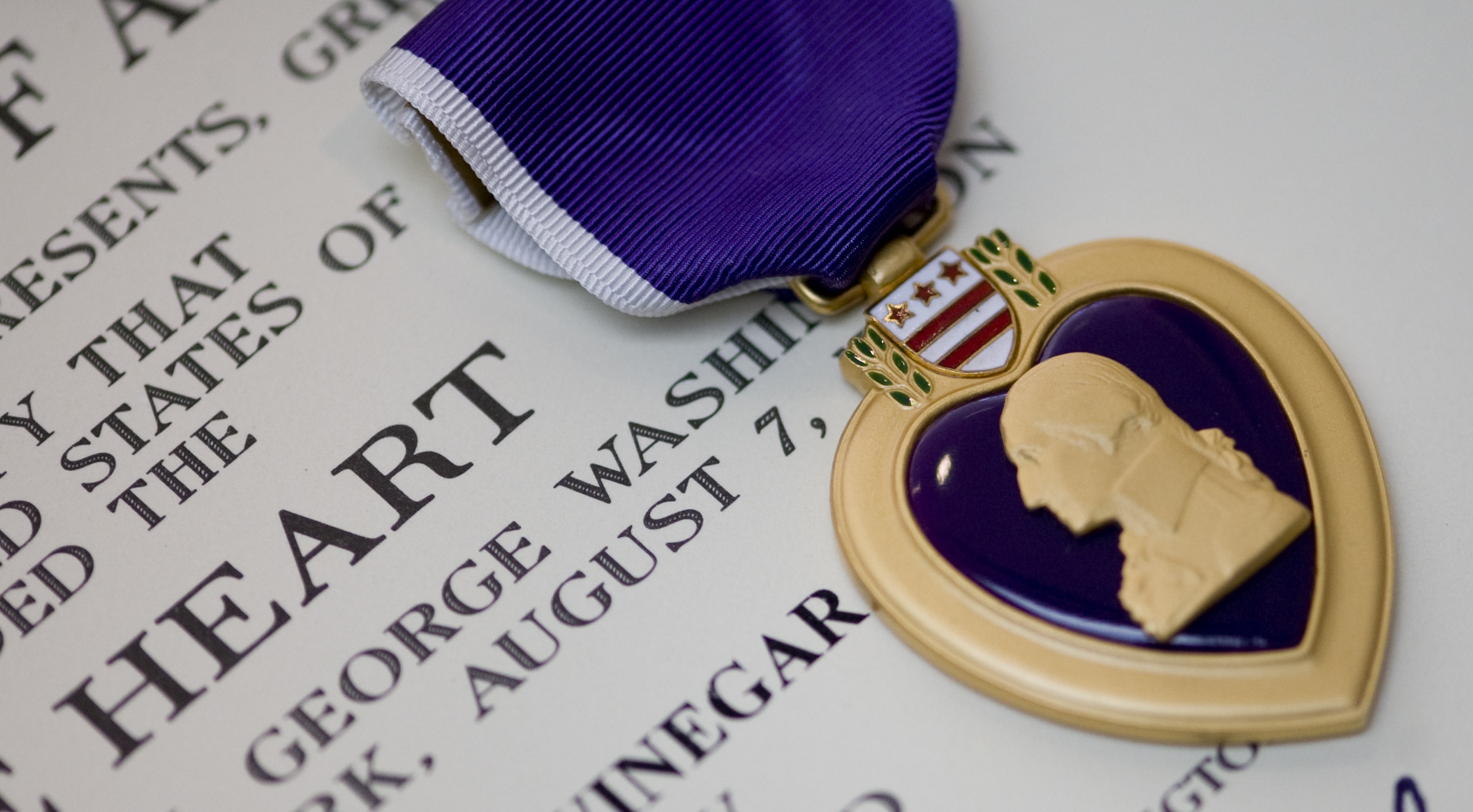
Hubbard claimed to have been wounded in combat, but was never awarded the Purple Heart (a decoration given to all US servicemen wounded in action).

Throughout his life, Hubbard made grossly exaggerated or outright false claims about himself. His estranged son Nibs reported that "Ninety-nine percent of what my father ever wrote or said about himself" was false. An acquaintance who knew Hubbard in Pasadena recalled recognizing Hubbard's epic autobiographical tales as being adapted from the writings of others. In October 1984, an American judge issued a ruling, writing of Hubbard that "the evidence portrays a man who has been virtually a pathological liar when it comes to his history, background and achievements." In his private "Affirmations", Hubbard wrote to himself:

You can tell all the romantic tales you wish... you know which ones were lies... You are gallant and dashing and need tell no lies at all. You have enough real experience to make anecdotes forever. Stick to your true adventures. Or if you wish, as you will, tell adventures which happened to others – People accept them better.

Hubbard described his grandfather as a "wealthy Western cattleman", but contemporary records show that Hubbard's grandfather, Lafayette Waterbury, was a veterinarian, not a rancher, and was not wealthy. Hubbard claimed to be a "blood brother" of the Native American Blackfeet tribe, but Hubbard lived over a hundred miles from the Blackfeet reservation and the tribe did not practice blood brotherhood. Hubbard claimed to have been the youngest Eagle Scout in Boy Scouts history, but in fact the organization kept no records of the ages of Eagle Scouts.

Hubbard claimed to have traveled to Manchuria, but his diary did not record it. Hubbard claimed to be a graduate engineer, but in fact he earned poor grades at university, was placed on probation in September 1931 and dropped out altogether in the fall of 1932. Hubbard used the title "Doctor", but his only doctorate was from a diploma mill. Hubbard claimed to have been crippled and blinded in combat, but records show he was never wounded and never received a Purple Heart (a decoration given to all US servicemen wounded in action). Hubbard's Navy service records indicate that he received only four campaign medals rather than the twenty-one claimed by Church biographies.

== Legacy ==
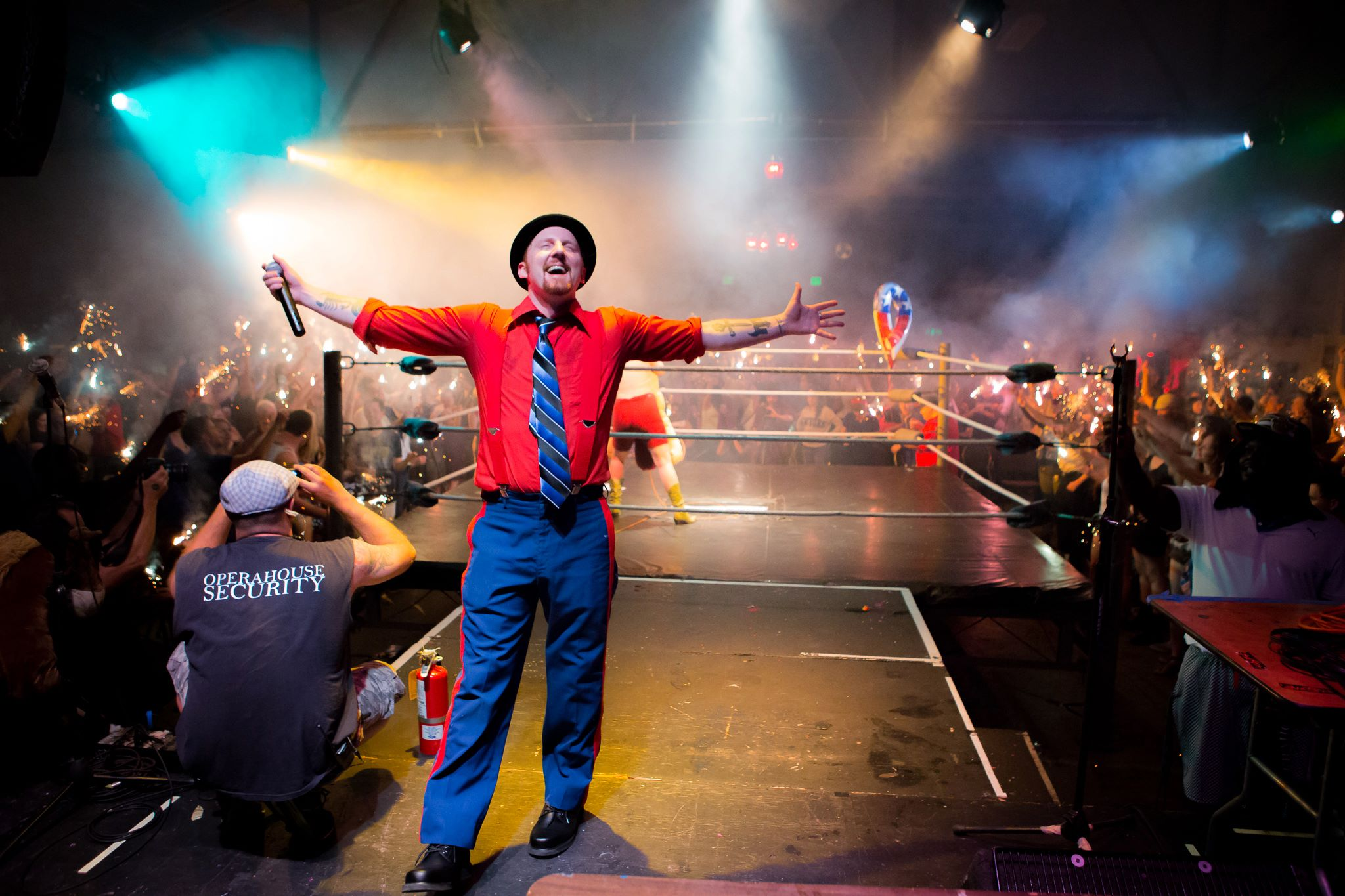
Hubbard's great-grandson, slam poet Jamie DeWolf

Hubbard was survived by his wife Mary Sue and all of his children except his second son Quentin. His will provided a trust fund to support Mary Sue; her children Arthur, Diana and Suzette; and Katherine, the daughter of his first wife Polly. He disinherited two of his other children. L. Ron Hubbard, Jr. had become estranged, changed his name to "Ronald DeWolf" and, in 1982, sued unsuccessfully for control of his father's estate. Alexis Valerie, Hubbard's daughter by his second wife Sara, had attempted to contact her father in 1971. She was rebuffed with the implied claim that her real father was Jack Parsons rather than Hubbard, and that her mother had been a Nazi spy during the war. Both later accepted settlements when litigation was threatened. In 2001, Diana and Suzette were reported to still be Church members, while Arthur had left and become an artist. Hubbard's great-grandson, Jamie DeWolf, is a noted slam poet.

Opinions are divided about Hubbard's literary legacy. One sociologist argued that even at Hubbard's peak in the late 1930s, he was regarded as merely "a passable, familiar author but not one of the best", while by the late-1970s "the [science fiction] subculture wishes it could forget him" and fans gave him a worse rating than any other of the "Golden Age" writers. The Encyclopedia of Science Fiction argues that while Hubbard could not be considered a peer of the "prime movers" like Asimov, Heinlein, and Sprague de Camp, Hubbard could be classed with Van Vogt as "rogue members of the early Campbell pantheon". Hubbard received various posthumous awards, having a street named after in him in Los Angeles and recognition of his birthday in Utah and New Jersey.

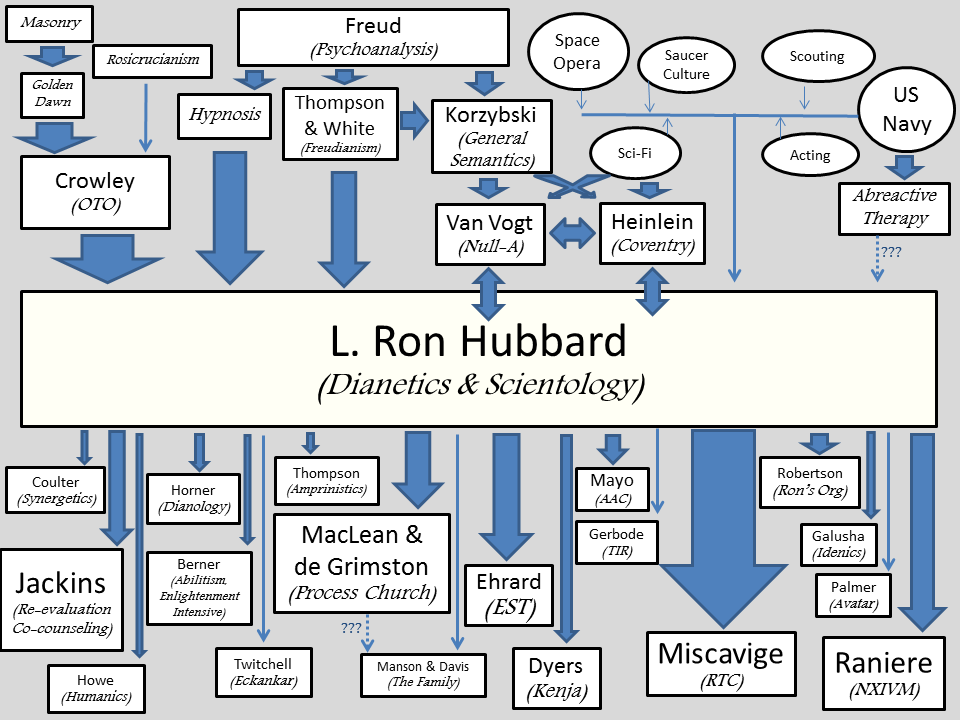
Hubbard's beliefs and practices, drawn from a diverse set of sources, influenced numerous offshoots, splinter-groups, and new movements.

Hubbard's teachings led to numerous offshoots and splinter groups. In 1966, two former Scientologists founded the Process Church of the Final Judgement which mixed Hubbard's teachings with Satanism. In 1969, a group led by former Scientologists Charles Manson and Bruce M. Davis was arrested and later convicted for their role in a series of high-profile murders. In 1971, former Scientologist Werner Erhard founded EST, a notable large group awareness training. In 1998, Keith Raniere drew upon Hubbard's writings and Erhard's techniques to create the large group awareness training ESP, a forerunner to the group NXIVM. Raniere offered students a chance to reach a superhuman state called "Unified" and taught Hubbard's doctrine of "suppressive persons"; Raniere was ultimately sentenced to 120 years for a pattern of crimes, including the sexual exploitation of a child, sex trafficking of women, and conspiracy to commit forced labor. In 2010, the Nation of Islam began introducing its followers to Hubbard's teachings, with leader Louis Farrakhan proclaiming "I thank God for Mr. L. Ron Hubbard!"

=== In Scientology ===
After his death, Scientology leaders announced that Hubbard's body had become an impediment to his work and that he had decided to "drop his body" to continue his research. The copyrights of his works and much of his estate were willed to the Church of Scientology. According to the church, Hubbard's entire corpus of Scientology and Dianetics texts are etched onto steel tablets in a vault under a mountain, on top of which a Hubbard-designed logo has been bulldozed, intended to be visible from space.

Hubbard's presence pervades Scientology, and his birthday is celebrated annually. Every Church of Scientology maintains an office reserved for Hubbard, with a desk, chair and writing equipment, ready to be used. Hubbard is regarded as the ultimate source of Scientology, and is often referred to as simply "Source", and he has no successor. Scientology has been described as "a movement focused on the figure of Hubbard". Hubbard is presented as "the master of a multitude of disciplines" who performed extraordinary feats as a photographer, composer, scientist, therapist, explorer, navigator, philosopher, poet, artist, humanitarian, adventurer, soldier, scout, musician and many other fields of endeavor. Busts and portraits of Hubbard are commonplace throughout Scientology organizations, and meetings involve a round of applause to Hubbard's portrait. In 2009, the American Religious Identification Survey found that 25,000 Americans identified as Scientologists.

Scientology's sacred texts are inextricably linked to L. Ron Hubbard. According to Scientology's official doctrine, "Hubbard is the sole author or narrator of each and every one of the religion's sacred books; indeed he is considered to be the single orchestrating genius behind everything Scientological." Scientologists consider everything Hubbard ever said in verbal or written terms as "scripture".

=== In popular culture ===
External videos
- 1980s advertisement for Dianetics
- "This is What Scientologists Actually Believe" clip from South Park, 2005
- "How Ayn Rand and L. Ron Hubbard Came Up With Their Big Ideas", Cracked, 2012
- "Black Scientologists", The Eric Andre Show, December 5, 2013
- Neurotology Music Video - SNL, satirizing the 1990 music video We Stand Tall
- "Hubbard meets Parsons" in Strange Angel episode Aeon, July 25, 2019

In the mid-1980s, the church began to promote Dianetics with a radio and television advertising blitz that was "virtually unprecedented in book circles". In March 1988, Dianetics topped the best-seller lists nationwide through an organized campaign of mass bookbuying. Booksellers reported patrons buying hundreds of copies at once and later receiving ostensibly-new books from the publisher with store price stickers already attached. Hubbard's number of followers peaked in the early 1990s with roughly 100,000 scientologists worldwide.

On November 21, 1997, the Fox network aired an episode of X-Files spinoff Millennium titled "Jose Chung's Doomsday Defense" which satirized Lafayette Ronald Hubbard's biography in a brief opening narration about a character named "Juggernaut Onan Goopta" who dreamt of becoming a neuroscientist only to discover that "his own brain could not comprehend basic biology". The character switches to philosophy, but "while reading Kirkegaard's 'The Sickness unto Death', he became sick and nearly died"; After writing an entire book in a "single, feverish night" that changed the course of human history, the character began lecturing to standing room only crowds, "for he shrewdly refrained from providing chairs". In a satire of both Hubbard and George Santayana, the character explains that painful memories must be exterminated, saying "those who cannot forget their past, are condemned to repeat it". The character establishes an institute where patients are called 'doctors' and founds a religious order called Selfosophy staffed by an elite paramilitary inspired by the US Postal Service. We are told the character died of cancer or "molted his earthly encumbrance to pursue his Selfosophical research in another dimension".

On February 8, 1998, Fox comedy The Simpsons broadcast "The Joy of Sect", satirizing Hubbard and Scientology when the family joins a group called the Movementarians ruled over by a figure called "The Leader" who physically resembles L. Ron Hubbard. The Movementarians' use of a 10-trillion-year commitment for its members alludes to the billion-year contract and both groups make extensive use of litigation. One of The Simpsons' voice actors, Nancy Cartwright, is herself a Scientologist.

In 2015, Saturday Night Live satirized Hubbard, with cast member Bobby Moynihan (bottom) using similar costumes and staging as shown in historic footage of Hubbard (top). A caption reads "Died of Pink Eye", referencing Hubbard's wartime diagnosis of conjunctivitis.

In 2000, Hubbard's novel was adapted into a film called Battlefield Earth, starring long-time Scientology celebrity John Travolta. In 2001, a film titled The Profit parodied Scientology and Hubbard. In 2005, animated comedy South Park aired the episode "Trapped in the Closet" in which protagonist Stan is believed to be the reincarnation of Hubbard. The episode broadcast the great secret behind the church—a condensed version of the Xenu story while an on-screen caption reads "This is what Scientologists actually believe". Prior to the episode, the story was almost completely unknown in mainstream culture.

Paul Thomas Anderson's 2012 film The Master features a religious leader named Lancaster Dodd, played by Philip Seymour Hoffman, who is based on Hubbard and shares a physical resemblance to him. The film depicts a Navy washout with psychological issues who is unable to hold down steady employment after the war. Facing potential legal troubles, he flees California by stowing away on a ship captained by self-proclaimed nuclear physicist and philosopher Lancaster Dodd, leader of a movement called "The Cause".

On December 5, 2013, The Eric Andre Show aired a comedy sketch titled "Black Scientologists" where André's character proclaims "Not a lot of people know this, but L. Ron Hubbard was a black man. His real name was L. Ron Hoyabembe!", while revealing an artist's conception of Hubbard wearing an afro. In April 2015, following the recent release of Going Clear: Scientology and the Prison of Belief, Saturday Night Live aired a music video featuring the "Church of Neurotology", a parody of Scientology's 1990 music video "We Stand Tall". Bobby Moynihan played a Hubbard-lookalike in the video. From 2018 to 2019, the show Strange Angel dramatized the life of Jack Parsons. In the season 2 finale, actor Daniel Abeles played Hubbard.

According to Hugh B. Urban in the book Handbook of Scientology, the nature of popular media accounts of Scientology is largely due to its culture of secrecy. An example of Scientology being "America's most secretive religion" is the documentary The Secrets of Scientology. Urban states, "However, while these popular accounts are often sensational and not particularly balanced, they do highlight the fact that secrecy has in fact been a pervasive aspect of the church from its inception."

== Select works ==
Hubbard was a prolific writer and lecturer across a wide variety of genres. His works of fiction include several hundred short stories and many novels. According to the Church of Scientology, Hubbard produced some 65 million words on Dianetics and Scientology, contained in about 500,000 pages of written material, 3,000 recorded lectures and 100 films.

Early fiction

- Buckskin Brigades (1937) recounts the story of a white man adopted by the Blackfeet tribe.
- Slaves of Sleep (1939) features a man, cursed by an evil genie, who instead of sleeping must now enter an Arabian Nights-like world ruled over by an evil-genie queen.
- Death's Deputy (1940) is the story of an accident-prone pilot who seemingly cannot be killed
- Final Blackout (1940) tells the story of a low-ranking British army officer who rises to the role of dictator.
- Fear (1951), a psychological thriller, follows a professor who, after an episode of missing time, becomes paranoid that demons are haunting him.
- Typewriter in the Sky (1951) features protagonist Mike de Wolf who finds himself inside a story being written by friend Horace Hackett.

Dianetics and Scientology

- Dianetics: The Modern Science of Mental Health (1950) introduced concepts like engram, reactive mind, and the State of Clear.
- Science of Survival (1951) introduced concepts like the tone scale, the thetan, and past lives.
- What to Audit (1952), later re-titled Scientology: A History of Man linked traumatic incidents throughout evolutionary history to modern health problems, for example, jaw trouble was said to result from unresolved trauma from having been a clam.
- Scientology 8-80 and Scientology 8-8008 (1952) embraced the magical worldview, teaching that the physical universe is a creation of the mind.
- Fundamentals of Thought (1956) argued life is a game, describing some people as "pieces", others as "players", and an elite few as "game makers".
- All About Radiation (1957) claimed radiation poisoning and cancer could be cured with vitamins.
- Introduction to Scientology Ethics (1968) codified an authoritarian set of ethics and justice procedures.
- Mission Into Time (1973) chronicled Hubbard's 1968 trip in the Mediterranean where he sought to find physical evidence of his past lives.

Late fiction

- Revolt in the Stars (1979), a screenplay version of the Xenu story
- Battlefield Earth (1982), a novel set in the year 3000 when humanity has become an endangered species, it tells the story of tribesman Johnny Goodboy Tyler who leads humanity in rebellion against the Psychlos, an evil alien race.
- Mission Earth (1985–87), a ten-book series, posthumously published, about an invasion of Earth by aliens called the Voltarian.

== Family tree ==
L. Ron Hubbard family tree

Ledora May Waterbury	Harry Ross Hubbard
L. Ron Hubbard
Margaret Grubb	Sara Northrup Hollister	Mary Sue Whipp
L. Ron Hubbard Jr.	Katherine; May	Alexis; Valerie	Diana Hubbard	Quentin Hubbard	Mary Suzette Hubbard	Arthur Hubbard
Deborah DeWolf Kennedy
Jamie DeWolf

== See also ==
- Timeline of L. Ron Hubbard
- List of Ig Nobel Prize winners
- Joseph Smith, creator of Mormonism
- Helena Blavatsky, creator of Theosophy
- Mary Baker Eddy, creator of Christian Science
- Wallace Fard Muhammad, creator of the Nation of Islam
