= We Stand Tall =

1990 Scientology musical video

We Stand Tall is a 1990 music video produced by the Church of Scientology. It features many individuals, including current Scientology leader, David Miscavige. Many of the participants have either come to publicly criticize the practices of the Church or have disappeared.

In the video, a chorus of Scientologists is seen singing the title song, with several of the organization's executives in the front and second row. From left to right are Shelly Miscavige, Ray Mithoff, Marc Yager, Mark Ingber, Mike Rinder, David Miscavige, Heber Jentzsch, Greg Wilhere, Mark Rathbun, and Guillaume Lesevre. Rinder and Jentzsch are in the second row. Also visible in the third row is former high ranking Sea Org member Mark Fisher, who escaped later in 1990. The video also shows Dianetics sessions, Volunteer Ministers distributing The Way to Happiness books, historical clips of L. Ron Hubbard lecturing and displaying the E-meter, several celebrities who are Scientologists, including John Travolta, several of the Church of Scientology properties including Saint Hill Manor, clips from 1988 promotional events announcing OTVIII, the new Mark Super VII model E-Meter, and the christening ceremony for the Freewinds ship.

== Reception ==
The video was parodied by Saturday Night Live in the show's 40th season in 2015, following the release of the Scientology documentary Going Clear. The pre-recorded sketch takes the form of a music video from 1990, known in the sketch as Always Believe, for the fictional and legally distinct organization Neurotology. The music video has been updated with on-screen annotations, similar to an annotated version of the original music video uploaded on YouTube, regarding the whereabouts of the participants, many of whom are said to have left the organization or have died. A great many more of the participants are simply listed as "missing," a reference to individuals like Shelly Miscavige, who some have alleged is missing, while others claim she has been imprisoned by the Church.
