= Scientology: A History of Man =

Book by L. Ron Hubbard

- 1960s edition
- Author: L. Ron Hubbard
- Original title: What To Audit
- Language: English
- Publisher: Scientific Press: Phoenix, Arizona
- Publication date: 1952
- Publication place: United States
- Media type: Print

Scientology: A History of Man is a book by L. Ron Hubbard, first published in 1952 under the title What to Audit by the Scientific Press of Phoenix. According to the author, it provides "a coldblooded and factual account of your last sixty trillion years." It has gone through many editions since its first publication and is a key text of the Church of Scientology. The book has been ridiculed by scholars, journalists and critics of Scientology for its unusual writing style and pseudoscientific claims; it has been described as "a slim pretense at scientific method ... blended with a strange amalgam of psychotherapy, mysticism and pure science fiction; mainly the latter."

== Publication history ==
According to Christopher Evans, the book reportedly originated in Scientology auditing sessions held in Wichita, Kansas in early 1952, involving Hubbard and his personal auditor, Perry Chapdelaine. Chapdelaine said that Hubbard would "settle himself on a couch with a tape recorder handy and an 'auditor' who would be expected to provide appropriate feedback. In no time a flow of introspection - like the free association characteristic of a psychoanalytic session - would begin."

In a different account, Hubbard's son, L. Ron Hubbard Jr. (otherwise known as "Nibs," or Ronald DeWolf) and Hubbard senior's medical officer, Jim Dincalci, have both stated that the book's content originated when Hubbard fed his son amphetamines:

[Hubbard] gave his son Nibs some amphetamines, and Nibs started talking, he said, started really going talking fast, from the speed. And he kept talking, he kept talking, and his dad kept giving him speed and all of a sudden he was talking about his history, when he was a clam and all these different situations in early Earth. And out of that came History of Man.

This material was first released as four lectures which Hubbard delivered to Scientologists on March 10, 1952. Further lectures followed in Phoenix, Arizona in April, and in July 1952 the book What to audit; a list and description of the principal incidents to be found in a human being was published by the Phoenix-based "Scientific Press" - an imprint established by Hubbard. The same book was published under the title A History of Man by the London-based Hubbard Association of Scientologists. It was reissued in two substantially modified editions, in 1968 (minus chapter 11 of the original book and under the current title of Scientology: A History of Man), in 1988, and again in 2007, this time with a set of lectures expanding on the content.

Since 1968, the book's jacket has displayed a picture of a hirsute, unkempt "caveman" dressed in a fur, eating the raw meat from a thigh bone of an animal. This appears to refer to one of the past-life incidents described by Hubbard in the book. Many Scientology books have similar curious pictures on their jackets; according to former Scientologist Bent Corydon, their purpose is to restimulate past-life memories and make the book irresistible to purchasers. Corydon states,

A special "Book Mission" was sent out to promote these books, now empowered and made irresistible by the addition of these supposedly overwhelming symbols or images. Organization staff were assured that if they simply held up one of the books, revealing its cover, that any bookstore owner would immediately order crateloads of them. A customs officer, seeing any of the book covers in one's luggage, would immediately pass one on through.

== Synopsis ==
As the original title suggests, What to Audit / A History of Man was written as a guide for Scientologist auditors, pointing out various Space opera incidents said to occur in all past lives.

The book proposes that the human body houses two separate entities. The most important is a thetan, said by Hubbard to be the true self of a person, accompanied by a genetic entity, or 'GE': "a sort of low-grade soul" located more or less in the centre of the body, and which passes to another body when the current body dies.

=== Key incidents ===
The book describes numerous incidents that, according to Hubbard, occurred to the thetan or the genetic entity in past lives. Although commonly misinterpreted as an alternative theory of evolution, the purpose of the incidents list is that individuals have subconscious memories of past lives as clams, sloths, and cavemen, and that those memories result in neuroses, known as 'engrams'. These stages of biological history, some typified by an animal and others typified by other items, were marked by traumatic incidents which have to be "run out" using an E-meter.

Hubbard emphasized that these incidents are not limited to the list below: for example, he notes "there are many steps and incidents between the Birds and the Sloth". The list arbitrarily names some incidents that Hubbard found particularly worth commenting on:

- The Atom, "complete with electronic rings". According to Hubbard: "There seems to be a 'hole in space' immediately ahead of the Atom", which generates a particular state of mind in a person.
- The Cosmic Impact, based on the premise that "As physicists tell us, cosmic rays enter the body in large numbers and occasionally explode in the body. Very early on the track the impact of a cosmic ray and its explosion is very destructive to the existing organism".
- The Photon Converter: essentially an early photosynthetic organism such as an alga or plankton. Hubbard deemed the Photon Converter to be responsible for fears of "light and dark, the storms of the sea, the fight to keep from rolling into the surf".
- The Helper, an incident of mitosis (cell division) in some unnamed organism which was "a confusing area for the [genetic entity] which therein has much cause for misidentification".
- The Clam, one of a number of incidents between The Helper and The Weeper. The others include seaweed and "jellyfish incidents [which] are quite remarkable for their occasional aberrative force". Encounters between jellyfish and cave walls are held to be responsible for the emergence of "a shell as in the clam". The Clam itself is "a deadly incident" involving a "scalloped-lip, white- shelled creature" which suffered from a severe split personality or "double-hinge problem. One hinge wishes to stay open, the other tries to close, thus conflict occurs". According to Hubbard, the hinges of the Clam "later become the hinges of the human jaw" and the Clam's method of reproduction in spores is said to be responsible for toothache. In one of the most famous passages of the book, Hubbard advised that

Should you desire to confirm this, describe to some uninitiated person the death of a clam without saying what you are describing. "Can you imagine a clam sitting on the beach, opening and closing its shell very rapidly?" (Make a motion with your thumb and forefinger of a rapid opening and closing). The victim may grip his jaws with his hand and feel quite upset. He may even have to have a few teeth pulled: At the very least he will argue as to whether or not the shell stays open at the end or closed. And he will, with no hint of the death aspect of it, talk about the "poor clam" and he will feel quite sad emotionally.

He goes on to warn the reader that "your discussion of these incidents with the uninitiated in Scientology can cause havoc. Should you describe the "clam" to someone, you may restimulate it in him to the extent of causing severe jaw pain. One such victim, after hearing about a clam death, could not use his jaws for three days".

- The Weeper/Boohoo incident deals with a mollusk that rolled in the surf for half a million years, pumping sea water from its shell as it breathed. Weepers had 'trillions of misadventures', whereof the principal was the anxiety of inhalation before the next wave. 'The inability of a pre-clear to cry,' Hubbard explained, 'is partly a hang-up in the Weeper. He is about to be hit by a wave, has his eyes full of sand or is frightened about opening his shell because he may be hit.'
- The Volcanoes occurred at several points: violent volcanic eruptions which choked the genetic entity's host organism with sulphurous smoke. Hubbard suggests that these eruptions hastened the progress of evolution, "for there is a lack of real reason why this evolution should not be continuing on even today." Volcanoes, believed by Scientologists to be used by Xenu to murder billions of thetans, are a prominent symbol frequently used in Scientology.
- Being Eaten is the next class of incident on the list. "In that so many fish and animals were equipped with so many teeth, it is inevitable that somebody somewhere on the track would have been eaten." Numerous engrams, therefore, depict this experience. Technique 80 is recommended by Hubbard for dealing with these problems. "Few auditors, in the absence of Technique 80, have been able to run these incidents".
- The Birds were a traumatic incident caused when "birds of a very crude construction developed a taste for clams". As a result of bird attacks on ancestral clams, modern man suffers from "falling sensations, indecision and other troubles."
- "The Sloth", says Hubbard, "is a chain of incidents and misadventures" covered under this general name. According to Hubbard, the Sloth was "slow and easily attacked and he had bad times falling out of trees when hit by snakes, falling off cliffs when attacked by baboons."
- The Ape is the name of the next incident, by which time the genetic entity was inhabiting an "agile and intelligent" host. "The Ape is usually an area of overt acts against animals and incidents of protecting young". (pg.54)
- The Piltdown Man was "a creature not an ape, yet not entirely a Man"; similar but not identical to the hoax of Piltdown Man. It resulted in a variety of psychological conditions in modern humans, including "obsessions about biting efforts to hide the mouth and early familial troubles." The Piltdown Man was characterized by "freakish acts of strange 'logic,' of demonstrating dangerous on one's fellows, of eating one's wife, and other illogical activities. The PILTDOWN teeth were ENORMOUS and he was quite careless as to whom and what he bit and often very much surprised at the resulting damage."
- The Caveman was the final stage of evolution prior to modern man, at which "one crippled one's woman to keep her [at home] or poisoned one's man for having kept her there.". Memories of this era were responsible, in Hubbard's view, for "any condition of interpersonal relationships" such as "jealousy and overt acts around it, strangling, smashing in heads with rocks, quarrels about homes, tribal rebukes, pack instincts."

Hubbard also described numerous incidents of "implanting" by hostile alien races, which caused traumatic memories in the thetan. This formed part of an elaborate cosmology of alien civilizations, interstellar dictators, and brainwashing implants - collectively described as "Space opera". In any incident, the thetan might be either protagonist, or victim.

- The "Halver" gave sexual compulsion, mixed with religious compulsion.
- Facsimile One "when audited out of a long series of people, was found to eradicate such things as asthma, sinus trouble, chronic chills and a host of other ills". Facsimile One is described as closing down the pineal gland which René Descartes described as the "principal seat of the soul" and is also associated with the third eye.

== The book's role in Scientology ==
As Hubbard himself said in the book, A History of Man was written as a technical aid for experienced Scientologists. According to ex-Scientologist Jon Atack, "The material in the book is hardly encountered in contemporary auditing, but is still required reading for the second secret "OT" level of Scientology." However, Scientology: A History of Man is part of the Basics Books collection, and is required reading for the Scientology Class VI Auditor Course. It has apparently been required reading for Level A of the Saint Hill Special Briefing Course (another name for Class VI) at least since 1981, as shown by the course curriculum of that date.

Christopher Evans notes that the book "marks a transition point at which the technically oriented Dianetics became the philosophically oriented Scientology."

== Critical views ==
A History of Man has attracted a good deal of comment from critical reviewers and analysts of Scientology. As Marco Frenschkowski notes, it is a "very strange book easily ridiculed". The author Jon Atack describes it as "among the most bizarre of Hubbard's works, [which] deserves the cult status that some truly dreadful science fiction movies have achieved". The Anderson Report of 1965 comments that "To say it is an astonishing document does not adequately convey the peculiar qualities or contents of "The History of Man ... For compressed nonsense and fantasy it must surpass anything theretofore written." Hubbard's biographer Russell Miller describes it in similar terms as "one of Hubbard's most bizarre works and possibly the most absurd book ever written", which "invited the derision which was inevitably forthcoming." Bent Corydon, a former Scientologist, criticises A History of Man by pointing out that Hubbard's "imaginings, opinions, or observations" are presented as established facts - in effect, instructing the Scientologist in what he should remember, rather than letting him find out for himself.

Apart from the unusual style of narration, which Miller describes as having "wobbled uncertainly between schoolboy fiction and a pseudo-scientific medical paper", many of Hubbard's claims in A History of Man are incompatible with established scientific knowledge.

== Publications ==
- Hubbard, L. Ron (1952). What to Audit. Phoenix, Arizona: Scientific Press (limited manuscript edition (According to flyleaf in 1968 edition)).
- Hubbard, L. Ron (1961). Scientology: A History of Man (New ed.). Los Angeles: Department of Publications World Wide.
- Hubbard, L. Ron (1968). Scientology: A History of Man (reprint ed.). Los Angeles: American Saint Hill Organization.
- Hubbard, L. Ron (1980). Scientology: A History of Man (reprint ed.). Denmark: Scientology Publ. Organization.
- Hubbard, L. Ron (1988). Scientology: A History of Man (reprint ed.). Los Angeles: Bridge Publications. ISBN 8773365378. OL 2127011M.
- Hubbard, L. Ron (2007). Scientology: A History of Man (New ed.). Los Angeles: Bridge Publications, Inc. ISBN 978-1-4031-4423-2.

== See also ==
- Bibliography of Scientology
- Scientology beliefs and practices
