= L. Ron Hubbard bibliography =

Lafayette Ronald Hubbard (March 13, 1911 – January 24, 1986), better known as L. Ron Hubbard, was an American pulp fiction author. He wrote in a wide variety of genres, including science fiction, fantasy, adventure fiction, aviation, travel, mystery, western, and romance. His United States publisher and distributor is Galaxy Press. He is perhaps best known for his self-help book, the #1 New York Times bestseller Dianetics: The Modern Science of Mental Health (first published in 1950), and as the founder of the Church of Scientology.

L. Ron Hubbard was a prolific writer; according to the church, his written teachings make up approximately 500,000 pages and 3,000 recorded lectures, totaling about 65 million words. He also produced a hundred films and 500 short stories and novels.

== Early writings ==
Although he was best known for his pulp fantasy and science fiction, Hubbard also wrote adventure, aviation, travel, mystery, western and romance. He wrote under his own name and as Kurt von Rachen and René Lafayette, his principal science fiction/fantasy pseudonyms. His other pen names included "Winchester Remington Colt" (rather obviously reserved for Westerns), Lt Jonathan Daly, Capt Charles Gordon, Bernard Hubbel, Michael Keith, Legionnaire 148, Legionnaire 14830, Ken Martin, Scott Morgan or Lt Scott Morgan, Barry Randolph and Capt Humbert Reynolds."

Hubbard's first short story, "Tah", was published in the Literary Supplement of The Hatchet, George Washington University's campus paper, in February 1932. In February 1934, the pulp magazine Thrilling Adventure was the first to publish one of Hubbard's short stories. Over the next six years, more than 140 of his short stories appeared in similar magazines devoted to high adventure and mystery.

Hubbard began publishing Science Fiction with the magazine Astounding in 1938, and over the next decade he was a prolific contributor to both Astounding and the fantasy fiction magazine Unknown. However, despite efforts by later supporters to assign to Hubbard a central role in the creation of modern science fiction, he was not a member of the small group of prime movers—L Sprague de Camp, Robert A Heinlein and Isaac Asimov—in the genre.

== Dianetics and Scientology ==
Hubbard's first major financial success came with the publication of Dianetics in 1950, after which he departed the field of science fiction writing for many years. In 1951, he refashioned the material of Dianetics into Scientology. At this time, he established his first publishing organization, devoted exclusively to his own works, and used it (and its later incarnations) to publish his own "spiritual technology," as well as his ideas about business administration, literacy, and drug rehabilitation.

Hubbard returned to the field of Science Fiction writing in 1982 with the publication of Battlefield Earth, followed by the Mission Earth "dekalogy," a ten-volume series, most of which was published posthumously.

== Output and reception ==
Hubbard produced more than 250 published works of fiction in his writing career. At his peak, he wrote “over 100,000 words a month.” He is remembered for his “prodigious output" and the "amazing speed at which he could produce copy.” He used a special electric IBM typewriter with extra keys for common words like ‘and’, ‘the’, and ‘but.’

Scientology's publishing arm has translated his work into seventy-two languages. His fiction and non-fiction books have sold millions of copies, and Hubbard holds four Guinness World Records for “Most Published Works by One Author”, “Most Audio Books Published for One Author”, “Most Translated Author in the World”, and "Most Translated Author, Same Book" (The Way to Happiness).

Criticism of Hubbard's fiction is mixed. Georges T. Dodds, columnist for WARP, newsletter/fanzine of the Montreal Science Fiction and Fantasy association writes, "much of [Hubbard's] science fiction and fantasy is quite entertaining, and in most cases as good or better than much of the pulp literature of the era." A reviewer for Publishers Weekly emphasizes "Hubbard's ability to pack an epic into relatively few pages -- this is indeed golden science fiction from the Golden Age". The Encyclopedia of Science Fiction maintains that science fiction "was clearly not Hubbard's forte, and most of his work in the genre reads as tendentious or laboured or both. As a writer of fantasy, however, [Hubbard] wrote with an occasionally pixillated fervour that is still pleasing, and sometimes reminiscent of the screwball comedies popular in the 1930s cinema."

Encyclopedia of Science Fiction says about Hubbard's last foray into the genre of science fiction: "Battlefield Earth: A Saga of the Year 3000 (1982), [is] an enormously long space opera composed in an idiom that seemed embarrassingly archaic. This was followed by the Mission Earth 'dekalogy,' a ten-volume sequence whose farcical over-egging of a seriously thin narrative thread fails to disguise a tale that would have been more at home in the dawn of the Pulp magazines, though its length would not have been tolerated."

== Controversy ==
While nineteen of Hubbard's books have appeared on the New York Times bestseller list, in 1990 the Los Angeles Times printed an article that referenced claims made by employees of Bridge Publications, then publisher of Hubbard's books, that employees would be instructed to buy copies of Hubbard's books if sales were low to manufacture bestsellers. In the same piece, Adam Clymer of the New York Times responded that the paper did not know who copies of books had been sold to, and that the paper had "uncovered no instances in which vast quantities of books were being sold to single individuals."

== Hollywood connection ==
Hubbard is credited with writing the story on which The Secret of Treasure Island, a 1938 Columbia Pictures movie serial, was based, as well as the story on which one episode of the TV show Tales of Wells Fargo (1957) was based.

== Best-known fiction ==
This is a partial list of Hubbard's published works of fiction. Included are Fear, To the Stars, Final Blackout and Typewriter in the Sky, which were published in 1940 and reprinted numerous times. To the Stars was published in Astounding Science Fiction magazine in 1950. Hubbard had a total of 235 works of fiction published. Reprinted titles, reprinted by publisher Galaxy Press, include The Iron Duke, Hostage to Death, Cargo of Coffins, Brass Keys to Murder, and Under the Black Ensign.

War-ravaged Europe is the setting of Final Blackout, which Pau Walker described as "a bleak, harsh novel of hopeless conflict and an idealistic lieutenant who fights it to its ironic end." A similar grim irony pervades Death's Deputy, in which an immortal, voided to punish humans according to the whims of his race, seeks in vain his own death. The short novels Typewriter in the Sky and Fear are horrific fantasies which many critics consider to be classics of the science fiction's golden age. Fear, which relates the existence of a man who alternates between psychosis and sanity, is considered among Hubbard's finest works. Hubbard's last book of this period, Return to Tomorrow, is a "space opera" which anticipates future science fiction themes in its story about intergalactic traders from whom one month equals a century of Earth time. Hubbard's stories written under the pseudonym of Rene Lafayette and collected in Ole Doc Methuselah (1970) relate the tales of a medical doctor who traverses time and space while opposing criminals and enemies for his profession.

=== Battlefield Earth ===
Battlefield Earth is a 1982 science fiction novel written by Hubbard. He composed a soundtrack to the book called Space Jazz. Initially titled Man, the Endangered Species, Battlefield Earth was first published in 1982 by St. Martin's Press, though all subsequent reprintings have been by Church of Scientology publishing companies Bridge Publications and Galaxy Press. Written in the style of the pulp fiction era (during which Hubbard began his writing career), the novel is over 750 pages in hardcover and 1000+ in paperback. It was Hubbard's first openly science fiction novel since his pulp magazine days of the 1940s, and it was promoted as Hubbard's "return" to science fiction after a long hiatus.

The Magazine of Fantasy & Science Fiction described the book as a "rather good, fast-paced, often fascinating SF adventure yarn." The fantasy author Neil Gaiman wrote, "For value for money I have to recommend L. Ron Hubbard's massive Battlefield Earth - over 1000 pages of thrills, spills, vicious aliens, noble humans. Is mankind an endangered species? Will handsome and heroic Jonny Goodboy Tyler win Earth back from the nine-foot-high Psychlos? A tribute to the days of Pulp, I found it un-put-downable. And all for £2.95". Frederik Pohl said, "I read 'Battlefield Earth' straight through in one sitting although it's immense... I was fascinated by it." Kevin J. Anderson says, "Battlefield Earth is like a 12-hour 'Indiana Jones' marathon. Non-stop and fast-paced. Every chapter has a big bang-up adventure." Publishers Weekly said about the novel, "This has everything: suspense, pathos, politics, war, humor, diplomacy and intergalactic finance..." Science fiction author A. E. van Vogt stated, "Wonderful adventure ... great characters ... a masterpiece." but later admitted that he had not actually read it due to its size.

Battlefield Earth went to the top of the New York Times Best Seller list and also those of the Los Angeles Times, TIME, United Press International, Associated Press, B. Dalton's and Waldenbooks. According to Hubbard's literary agents, Author Services Inc., by June 1983 the book had sold 150,000 copies and earned $1.5 million.

The book was adapted for film in 2000, and retains a cult status, despite bombing at the box office and being critically panned.

=== To the Stars ===
To the Stars was first published in book format in 1954 under the title Return to Tomorrow, and was first published in hardcover in 1975 under the same title. The book was generally positively received, and garnered a 2001 nomination for a "Retro" Hugo Award for Best Novella. Publishers Weekly gave the book a positive review, calling it one of Hubbard's "finest works", and Alan Cheuse highlighted the work on National Public Radio's program All Things Considered as a top literature holiday pick.

Galaxy reviewer Groff Conklin described the 1954 edition as "a fast-paced and grim adventure . . . just short of absurdity, but interesting nevertheless." Anthony Boucher panned the novel, calling it "a surprisingly routine and plotless space opera."

=== Buckskin Brigades ===
Buckskin Brigades was Hubbard's first hard-covered book, and his first published novel. Hubbard incorporates historical background from the Blackfeet tribe into the book. The book was re-released by Bridge Publications in a 1987 edition. The book was published in an audio book format by Bridge Publications and read by actor Bruce Boxleitner, who was hired by Church of Spiritual Technology subsidiary Author Services Inc. to read Hubbard's books on tape. The New York Times stated that, "Mr. Hubbard has reversed a time-honored formula and has given a thriller to which, at the end of every chapter or so, another paleface bites the dust . . . (has) an enthusiasm, even a freshness and sparkle, decidedly rare in this type of romance."

Some sources state that as a young man, Hubbard became a blood brother to the Piegan Blackfeet Native American tribe while living in Montana, though this claim is disputed. Hubbard incorporates historical background from the Blackfeet tribe into the book.

=== Death's Deputy ===
Death's Deputy was first published in book form, in 1948, by Fantasy Publishing Company, Inc. The novel originally appeared in the February 1940 issue of the magazine Unknown.

=== Fear ===
Fear is a psychological thriller-horror novella by Hubbard first appearing in Unknown Fantasy Fiction in July 1940. Stephen King called the book, "A classic tale of creeping, surreal menace and horror." This is possibly Hubbard's most critically acclaimed novel, receiving positive reviews from the likes of Isaac Asimov and Ray Bradbury.

=== Final Blackout ===
Final Blackout was first published in serialized format in 1940 in the science fiction magazine Astounding Science Fiction. It was published in book form in 1948 by The Hadley Publishing Co. Author Services Inc. published a hardcover edition of the book in 1988, and in 1989 the Church of Scientology-affiliated organization Bridge Publications announced that film director Christopher Cain had signed a contract to write and direct a movie version based on the book. Final Blackout and Fear are often cited by critics as the best examples of Hubbard's pulp fiction works. Robert Heinlein called the book “as perfect a piece of Science Fiction as has ever been written." Chuck Moss of Daily News of Los Angeles called the book "extremely good science fiction". The book has been included in the curriculum of a science-fiction writing class at California State Polytechnic University, Pomona. Karl Edward Wagner cited Final Blackout as one of the thirteen best science-fiction horror novels.

=== Kingslayer ===
Kingslayer is a collection of science fiction short stories by Hubbard. It was first published in 1949 by Fantasy Publishing Company, Inc. in an edition of 1,200 copies. The title story first appeared in this collection. The other stories had previously appeared in the magazine Astounding.

=== Ole Doc Methuselah ===
Ole Doc Methuselah, published in 1970, is a collection of science fiction short stories by Hubbard originally published in Astounding Science Fiction from 1947 to 1950.

=== Slaves of Sleep ===
Slaves of Sleep was first published in book form, in 1948, by Shasta Publishers, and originally appeared in 1939 in an issue of the magazine Unknown.

=== Typewriter in the Sky ===
Typewriter in the Sky was well received. The Philadelphia Inquirer called it "swashbuckling fun", and John Clute and John Grant in The Encyclopedia of Fantasy characterized the work as the best of Hubbard's stories from the Arabian-fantasy theme.

=== Mission Earth ===
Mission Earth is an epic science fiction novel, split into ten volumes of unequal length. Each volume was a New York Times bestseller. The ten volumes of the Mission Earth series, all bar the first of which were published posthumously, comprise The Invaders Plan (1985), Black Genesis: Fortress of Evil, The Enemy Within, An Alien Affair, Fortune Of Fear, Death Quest (1986), Voyage Of Vengeance, Disaster, Villainy Victorious, and The Doomed Planet (1987).

== Contests for writers and illustrators ==
In 1983, Hubbard started the "Writers Award Contest", a competition aimed at discovering, and eventually publishing, deserving amateur and aspiring writers. The L. Ron Hubbard Illustrators of the Future Contest was launched in 1988. Winning illustrators illustrate a winning story from the Writers of the Future contest. The program is administered by Author Services.

== Table of works ==
=== Non-fiction articles ===
Date	Title	Publication
January 1932	"Tailwind Willies"	The Sportsman Pilot
November 1932	"Sans Power"	The Sportsman Pilot
June 1933	"Washington's Langley Day"	The Sportsman Pilot
November 1933	"Music With Your Navigation"	The Sportsman Pilot
July 1934	"No Matter What You Call It, It Just Grins"	The Sportsman Pilot
September 1934	"XC"	The Sportsman Pilot
September 15, 1934	"San Diego Fair Meet"	The Sportsman Pilot
December 1934	"West Indies Whys And Whithers"	The Sportsman Pilot
January 1935	"Won't You Sit Down?"	The Sportsman Pilot
February 1935	"Mahomet Come To The Mountain"	The Sportsman Pilot
August 15, 1936	"Test Pilots, 1936"	The Sportsman Pilot
July 1935	"Story Vitality"	Writer's Review
July 1935	"Circulate"	The Author & Journalist
January 1936	"Magic Out of a Hat"	Writer's Digest
June 1937	"Suspense"	The Author & Journalist
May 1941	"It Bears Telling"	Explorer's Club
January 1949	"Steps In The Right Direction"	Writers' Markets & Methods

=== Pulp fiction ===
Date	Title	Publication
Feb 19, 1934	"The Green God"	Thrilling Adventures
Oct 19, 1934	"Yellow Loot"	Thrilling Adventures
Nov 19, 1934	"Hurtling Wings"	Five Novels
Jan 19, 1935	"The Phantom Patrol"	Five Novels
Jan 19, 1935	"The Trail of the Red Diamonds"	Thrilling Adventures
Feb 19, 1935	"The Red Dragon"	Five Novels
Feb 19, 1935	"Flame City"	Thrilling Detective
Mar 19, 1935	"Destiny's Drum"	Five Novels
Apr 19, 1935	"Brass Keys to Murder"	Five Novels
May 1, 1935	"The Cossack"	Mystery Adventures
May 19, 1935	"False Cargo"	Five Novels
May 19, 1935	"The Squad that Never Came Back"	Thrilling Adventures
May 19, 1935	"The Drowned City"	Top Notch
Jun 1, 1935	"Man-Killers of the Air"	Five Novels
Jul 1, 1935	"Hostage to Death"	Five Novels
Jul 1, 1935	"Hell's Legionnaire"	Mystery Adventures
Aug 19, 1935	"Under the Black Ensign"	Five Novels
Aug 19, 1935	"Yukon Madness"	Mystery Adventures
Aug 19, 1935	"The Contraband Crate"	Sky Birds
Sep 19, 1935	"Buckley Plays a Hunch"	Top Notch
Sep 19, 1935	"Medals for Mahoney"	Top Notch
Sep 19, 1935	"The Sky Devil"	Top Notch
Oct 1, 1935	"He Walked to War"	Adventure
Oct 19, 1935	"Forbidden Gold"	Five Novels
Oct 19, 1935	"Wind-Gone-Mad"	Top Notch
Nov 19, 1935	"The Black Sultan"	Thrilling Adventures
Nov 19, 1935	"Five Mex for a Million" & "The Adventure of 'X"	Top Notch
Dec 19, 1935	"The Barbarians"	Dime Adventure
Dec 19, 1935	"Machine Gun 21,000"	Dynamic Adventures
Jan 19, 1936	"Starch and Stripes"	Dime Adventure
Jan 19, 1936	"The Sky-Crasher"	Five Novels
Jan 19, 1936	"Trick Soldier"	Top Notch
Feb 19, 1936	"Red Sand"	Top Notch
Mar 14, 1936	"The Blow Torch Murder"	Detective Fiction Weekly
Mar 19, 1936	"Hurricane!"	Five Novels
Mar 19, 1936	"Price of a Hat"	Thrilling Adventures
Apr 19, 1936	"Spy Killer"	Five Novels
May 2, 1936	"They Killed Him Dead"	Detective Fiction Weekly
May 19, 1936	"Loot of the Shanung"	Smashing Novels
Jun 1, 1936	"Escape for Three"	Thrilling Adventures
Jun 6, 1936	"The Mad Dog Murder"	Detective Fiction Weekly
Jul 1, 1936	"The Grease Spot"	Thrilling Detective
Jul 11, 1936	"Sleepy McGee"	Argosy
Jul 18, 1936	"Don't Rush Me"	Argosy
Aug 19, 1936	"The Headhunters"	Five Novels
Sep 19, 1936	"Mr. Tidwell Gunner"	Adventure
Sep 19, 1936	"The Baron of Coyote River"	All Western
Sep 19, 1936	"Sky Birds Dare!"	Five Novels
Sep 19, 1936	"Golden Hell"	Thrilling Adventures
Oct 3, 1936	"Mr. Luck"	Argosy
Oct 17, 1936	"Test Pilot"	Argosy
Oct 19, 1936	"Black Towers to Danger"	Five Novels
Oct 19, 1936	"Flaming Arrows"	Mystery Adventures
Oct 19, 1936	"Tomb of the Ten Thousand Dead"	Thrilling Adventures
Oct 24, 1936	"Deep-Sea Diver"	Argosy
Oct 31, 1936	"The Big Cats"	Argosy
Nov 7, 1936	"River Driver"	Argosy
Nov 19, 1936	"The No-Gun Gunhawk"	Western Aces
Dec 5, 1936	"Mine Inspector"	Argosy
Dec 12, 1936	"The Shooter"	Argosy
Dec 19, 1936	"While Bugles"	Five Novels
Dec 19, 1936	"Fifty-fifty O'Brian"	Top Notch
Jan 9, 1937	"Steeplejack"	Argosy
Jan 23, 1937	"Flying Trapeze"	Argosy
Feb 6, 1937	"Mountaineer"	Argosy
Feb 19, 1937	"The Bold Dare All"	Five Novels
Mar 19, 1937	"Cattle King for a Day"	All Western
Mar 19, 1937	"The Battling Pilot"	Five Novels
Mar 20, 1937	"A Lesson in Lightning"	Argosy
Jun 1, 1937	"All Frontiers Are Jealous"	Five Novels
Jun 1, 1937	"The Crate Killer"	War Birds
Jul 1, 1937	"The Dive Bomber"	Five Novels
Aug 21, 1937	"Nine Lives"	Argosy
Sep 19, 1937	"I Was Buried Alive!"	Personal Adventure Stories
Sep 19, 1937	"Reign of the Gila Monster"	Western Aces
Oct 19, 1937	"Red Death Over China"	War Birds
Nov 19, 1937	"Gunman's Tally"	All Western
Nov 19, 1937	"The Devil With Wings"	Five Novels
Dec 19, 1937	"Highly Hazardous - Pilots!"	Five Novels
Dec 19, 1937	"Tinhorn's Daughter"	Western Romances
Mar 12, 1938	"Six-Gun Caballero"	Western Story
Mar 19, 1938	"Under the Die-Hard Brand"	Western Aces
Apr 19, 1938	"Highly Hazardous - Deep Sea Diver"	Five Novels
Jun 1, 1938	"Boomerang Bomber"	Sky Aces
Jun 11, 1938	"The Toughest Ranger"	Western Story
Jun 25, 1938	"Hot Lead Payoff" Part 1 of 4	Western Story
Jul 1, 1938	"The Dangerous Dimension"	Astounding Science Fiction
Jul 1, 1938	"King of the Gunmen"	Western Yarns
Jul 2, 1938	"Hot Lead Payoff" Part 2 of 4	Western Story
Jul 9, 1938	"Hot Lead Payoff" Part 3 of 4	Western Story
Jul 16, 1938	"Hot Lead Payoff" Part 4 of 4	Western Story
Aug 19, 1938	"When Gilhooly Was in Flower"	Romantic Range
Aug 19, 1938	"The Ghost-Town Gun-Ghost"	Western Action
Sep 10, 1938	"Boss of the Lazy B"	Western Story
Sep 19, 1938	"The Tramp"	Astounding Science Fiction
Oct 15, 1938	"Come and Get It"	Western Story
Oct 19, 1938	"The Tramp"	Astounding Science Fiction
Oct 19, 1938	"Buckskin Brigades"	Complete Northwest
Oct 19, 1938	"The Lieutenant Takes The Sky" / "Branded Outlaw"	Five Novels
Oct 29, 1938	"Death Waits at Sundown"	Western Story
Nov 19, 1938	"The Tramp"	Astounding Science Fiction
Nov 19, 1938	"Silent Pards"	Western Story
Dec 19, 1938	"Empty Saddles"	Adventure Yarns
Dec 24, 1938	"Ruin at Rio Piedras"	Western Story
Jan 19, 1939	"Trouble On His Wings"	Five Novels
Feb 19, 1939	"Wings over Ethiopia"	Air Action
Apr 19, 1939	"The Hurricane's Roar"	Adventure Novels and Short Stories
Apr 19, 1939	"The Falcon Killer"	Five Novels
Apr 19, 1939	"The Ultimate Adventure"	Unknown
May 19, 1939	"Danger In The Dark"	Unknown
Jul 1, 1939	"Slaves of Sleep"	Unknown
Aug 19, 1939	"The Ghoul"	Unknown
Oct 19, 1939	"The Ranch That No One Would Buy"	Western Yarns
Feb 19, 1940	"The Professor Was A Thief"	Astounding Science Fiction
Feb 19, 1940	"If I Where You"	Five Novels
Feb 19, 1940	"The Small Boss of Nunaloha"	South Sea Stories
Feb 19, 1940	"Deaths Deputy"	Unknown
Apr 19, 1940	"Final Blackout" part 1 of 3	Astounding Science Fiction
Apr 19, 1940	"The Indigestible Triton"	Unknown
May 19, 1940	"Final Blackout" part 2 of 3	Astounding Science Fiction
May 19, 1940	"On Blazing Wings"	Five Novels
Jun 1, 1940	"Final Blackout" part 3 of 3	Astounding Science Fiction
Jun 1, 1940	"Inky Odds"	Five Novels
Jun 1, 1940	"Shadows From Boothill"	Wild West Weekly
Jul 1, 1940	"The Idealist"	Astounding Science Fiction
Jul 1, 1940	"The Iron Duke"	Five Novels
Jul 1, 1940	"Fear"	Unknown
Aug 19, 1940	"Sabotage In The Sky"	Five Novels
Sep 19, 1940	"The Kilkenny Cats"	Astounding Science Fiction
Oct 19, 1940	"The Devil's Rescue"	Unknown
Nov 19, 1940	"One Was Stubborn"	Astounding Science Fiction
Nov 19, 1940	"Typewriter in the Sky [Part 1]"	Unknown
Dec 19, 1940	"Typewriter in the Sky [Part 2]"	Unknown
Jan 19, 1941	"The Traitor"	Astounding Science Fiction
Feb 19, 1941	"The Crossroads"	Unknown
Apr 19, 1941	"The Mutineers"	Astounding Science Fiction
Aug 19, 1941	"The Case of the Friendly Corpse"	Unknown
Oct 19, 1941	"Borrowed Glory"	Unknown
Nov 19, 1941	"The Last Drop"	Astonishing Stories
Jan 19, 1942	"The Invaders"	Astounding Science Fiction
Feb 19, 1942	"The Rebels"	Astounding Science Fiction
Feb 19, 1942	"He Didn't Like Cats"	Unknown
Apr 19, 1942	"Strain"	Astounding Science Fiction
Apr 19, 1942	"The Room"	Unknown
Jun 1, 1942	"The Slaver"	Astounding Science Fiction
Jul 1, 1942	"Space Can"	Astounding Science Fiction
Oct 19, 1942	"The Beast"	Astounding Science Fiction
Apr 19, 1943	"The Great Secret"	Science Fiction Stories
Jul 1, 1947	"The Chee-Chalker"	Five Novels
Aug 19, 1947	"The End is Not Yet"	Astounding Science Fiction
Sep 19, 1947	"The End is Not Yet"	Astounding Science Fiction
Oct 19, 1947	"The End is Not Yet"	Astounding Science Fiction
Oct 19, 1947	"Old Doc Methuselah"	Astounding Science Fiction
Nov 19, 1947	"The Expensive Slaves"	Astounding Science Fiction
Mar 19, 1948	"Her Majesty's Aberration"	Astounding Science Fiction
May 19, 1948	"The Obsolete Weapon"	Astounding Science Fiction
Jun 1, 1948	"The Magic Quirt"	The Rio Kid
Jul 1, 1948	"When Shadows Fall"	Startling Stories
Sep 19, 1948	"The Great Air Monopoly"	Astounding Science Fiction
Dec 19, 1948	"Stacked Bullets"	Famous Western
Dec 19, 1948	"240,000 Miles Straight Up"	Thrilling Wonder Stories
Jan 19, 1949	"Forbidden Voyage"	Startling Stories
Feb 19, 1949	"Gunman!"	Famous Western
Mar 19, 1949	"The Magnificent Failure"	Startling Stories
Apr 19, 1949	"Plague!"	Astounding Science Fiction
Apr 19, 1949	"The Gunner From Gehenna"	Giant Western
Apr 19, 1949	"Gun Boss of Tumbleweed"	Thrilling Western
May 1949	"The Battle of the Wizards"	Fantasy Book
May 19, 1949	"The Conroy Diary"	Astounding Science Fiction
May 19, 1949	"The Incredible Destination"	Startling Stories
Jun 1, 1949	"A Sound Investment"	Astounding Science Fiction
Jul 1, 1949	"The Unwilling Hero"	Startling Stories
Aug 19, 1949	"A Matter of Matter"	Astounding Science Fiction
Aug 19, 1949	"Johnny, the Town Tamer"	Famous Western
Sep 19, 1949	"Beyond the Black Nebula"	Startling Stories
Sep 19, 1949	"Blood on His Spurs"	Thrilling Western
Sep 19, 1949	"Guns of Mark Jardine"	Western Action
Oct 19, 1949	"The Automagic Horse"	Astounding Science Fiction
Oct 19, 1949	"The Planet Makers"	Thrilling Wonder Stories
Oct 19, 1949	"Buckskin Brigades"	Triple Western
Nov 19, 1949	"The Emperor of the Universe"	Startling Stories
Nov 19, 1949	"Man For Breakfast"	Texas Rangers
Winter 1950	"The Kingslayer"	Two Complete Science-Adventure Books
Dec 19, 1949	"A Can of Vacuum"	Astounding Science Fiction
Dec 19, 1949	"Stranger in Town"	Famous Western
Jan 19, 1950	"Ole Mother Methuselah"	Astounding Science Fiction
Jan 19, 1950	"The Last Admiral"	Startling Stories
Jan 19, 1950	"Beyond All Weapons"	Super Science Stories
Jan 19, 1950	"Hoss Tamer"	Thrilling Western
Feb 19, 1950	"To the Stars"	Astounding Science Fiction
Feb 19, 1950	"Devil's Manhunt"	Famous Western
Mar 19, 1950	"To the Stars"	Astounding Science Fiction
Apr 19, 1950	"Greed"	Astounding Science Fiction
May 19, 1950	"Dianetics: Evolution of a Science"	Astounding Science Fiction
May 19, 1950	"The No-Gun Man"	Thrilling Western
Jun 1, 1950	"Vengeance Is Mine!"	Real Western Stories
Aug 19, 1950	"Battling Bolto"	Thrilling Wonder Stories
Sep 19, 1950	"The Final Enemy"	Super Science Stories
Oct 19, 1950	"The Analytical Mind"	Astounding Science Fiction
Oct 19, 1950	"The Masters of Sleep"	Fantastic Adventures
Nov 19, 1950	"Tough Old Man"	Startling Stories
Jan 19, 1951	"Dianomitry"	Astounding Science Fiction
Feb 19, 1951	"River Driver"	Max Brand's Western

=== Fiction novels ===
1. Under the Black Ensign (1935)
2. Buckskin Brigades (1937), ISBN 0-88404-280-4
3. Slaves of Sleep (1939)
4. Ultimate Adventure, the (1939)
5. Final Blackout (1940), ISBN 0-88404-340-1
6. Indigestible Triton, the (1940)
7. The Automagic Horse (1940) published (1994)
8. The End Is Not Yet (1947) (serialized in Astounding Science Fiction, no book publication reported
9. Death's Deputy (1948)
10. The Kingslayer (1949)
11. To the Stars (1950)
12. The Masters of Sleep (1950)
13. Fear (1951), ISBN 0-88404-599-4
14. Typewriter in the Sky (1951), ISBN 0-88404-933-7
15. Return to Tomorrow (1954)
16. The Ultimate Adventure (1970)
17. Ole Doc Methuselah (1953), ISBN 0-88404-653-2
18. Seven Steps to the Arbiter (1975)
19. Revolt in the Stars (1979 - Unpublished)
20. Battlefield Earth (1982), ISBN 0-312-06978-2
21. Mission Earth 1. The Invaders Plan (1985)
22. Mission Earth 2. Black Genesis (1986)
23. Mission Earth 3.The Enemy Within (1986)
24. Mission Earth 4. An Alien Affair (1986)
25. Mission Earth 5. Fortune of Fear (1986)
26. Mission Earth 6. Death Quest (1986)
27. Mission Earth 7. Voyage of Vengeance (1987)
28. Mission Earth 8. Disaster (1987)
29. Mission Earth 9. Villainy Victorious (1987)
30. Mission Earth 10. The Doomed Planet (1987)

=== Short story collections ===
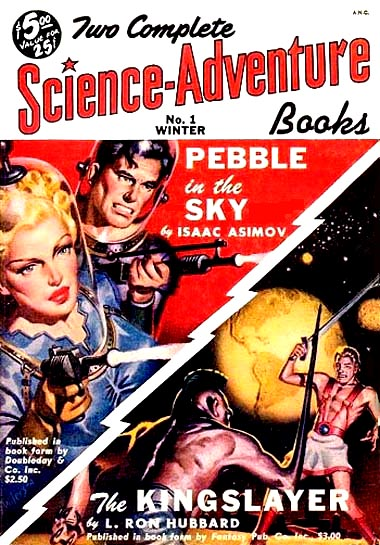
Hubbard's novella "The Kingslayer" was reprinted in Two Complete Science-Adventure Books in 1950 after its original publication in a 1949 Hubbard collection

Beginning in the 1990s Author Services began publishing volumes of Hubbard's short fiction organized by genre (Adventure, Mystery/Suspense, Science Fiction, Western, etc.) At least 42 volumes were published. The following information comes from the Library of Congress's Online Catalog, with supplemental information from www.bookfinder.com

Adventure Stories

- V1-Five mex for a million; Price for a hat; The cossack
- V2-The black sultan; The barbarians—Red Sand
- V3-The trail of the red diamonds; Golden hell; Tomb of the ten thousand dead
- V4-Starch and stripes; Trick soldier; Mr. Tidwell, gunner --
- V5-Tah; Grounded; Yellow loot; Red death over China --
- V6-The squad that never came back; The adventure of "X"; Escape for three --
- V7-The sky devil; He walked to war; The crate killer --
- V8-Yukon madness; Medals for Mahoney; Wings over Ethiopia --
- V9-Catapult courage; Raiders of the beam; Boomerang bomber --
- V10-The green god; Machine gun 21,000; Fifty-Fifty O’Brien
- V11-Pearl pirate; The drowned city; The small boss of Nunaloha

Fantasy Stories

- V1-The crossroads; The devil's rescue; The room
- V2-The dangerous dimension; The professor was a thief; The last drop; He didn't like cats
- V3-Danger in the Dark; Borrowed Glory; If I Were You

Hell Job Series

- V1-Sleepy McGee; Don't rush me; Mr. Luck
- V2-Test pilot; Deep-sea diver; The big cats
- V3-River driver; The ethnologist; Mine inspector
- V4-The shooter; Steeplejack; Flying trapeze
- V5-Mountaineer; A lesson in lightning; Nine lives

Mystery/Suspense Stories

- V1-Calling squad cars!; The blow torch murder; The grease spot; Killer's law --
- V2-Dead men kill; Mouthpiece; The mad dog murder
- V3-The death flyer; They killed him dead; The slickers

Ole Doc Methuselah Stories

- V1-Ole Doc Methuselah; Her Majesty's aberration; The expensive slaves; The great air monopoly
- V2-Plague!; A sound investment; Ole Mother Methuselah.

Science Fiction Stories

- V1-240,000 miles straight up; The were-human; He found God
- V2-The obsolete weapon; The planet makers; Beyond all weapons
- V3-Battle of wizards; A can of vacuum; Tough old man
- V4-One was stubborn; A matter of matter; Greed
- V5-STRAIN; THE SLAVER; SPACE CAN; FINAL ENEMY
- V6-The great secret; The automagic horse; Battling Bolto

Western Stories

- V1-Hoss tamer; Stranger in town; The ghost town gun-ghost
- V2-The toughest ranger; The bad one; Marriage for spite; Horse and horse
- V3-Tinhorn's daughter; Johnny, the town tamer
- V4-The baron of Coyote River; Man for breakfast; Blood on his spurs
- V5-The neck scarf; The no-gun gunhawk; Devil's manhunt --
- V6-Maybe because--!; "Tooby"; Plans for the boy; Under the Diehard brand
- V7-Canteens!; Ride 'em, cowboy; The ranch that no one would buy
- V8-When Gilhooly was in flower; Boss of the Lazy B; Ruin at Rio Piedras
- V9-Come and get it; Death waits at sundown; Cattle king for a day
- V10-Leaducation; Reign of the Gila monster; Gun boss of the Tumbleweed
- V11-King of the gunmen; Silent paards; Shadows from Boot Hill; Gunman!--
- V12-The magic quirt; Stacked bullets; The Gunner from Gehenna

=== Dianetics and Scientology ===
- Dianetics: The Modern Science of Mental Health (May 1950)
- Dianetics: The Original Thesis (1951)
- Science of Survival (June 1951)
- Self Analysis (August 1951)
- Advanced Procedure and Axioms (November 1951)
- Handbook For Preclears (December 1951)
- Scientology: A History of Man (July 1952)
- Scientology 8-80 (November 1952)
- Scientology 8-8008 (December 1952)
- How to Live though an Executive (1953)
- The Creation of Human Ability (July 1954)
- Dianetics 55! (December 1954)
- Dianetics: The Evolution of a Science (1955)
- Brain-Washing Manual (1955)
- Problems of Work (1956)
- Scientology: The Fundamentals of Thought (1956)
- All About Radiation (1957)
- Have You Lived Before This Life? (1958)
- The Book of E-Meter Drills (1965)
- Introduction to Scientology Ethics (1968)
- Mission Into Time (1973)
- Hymn of Asia: An Eastern Poem (1974)
- Scientology: A New Slant on Life (1976)
- The Way to Happiness (1981)

=== Adaptations by other authors ===
- Ai! Pedrito! When Intelligence Goes Wrong by Kevin J. Anderson (1998), ISBN 978-1-59212-003-1
- A Very Strange Trip by Dave Wolverton (1999), ISBN 978-1-57318-164-8
