= Life of L. Ron Hubbard from 1911 to 1950 =

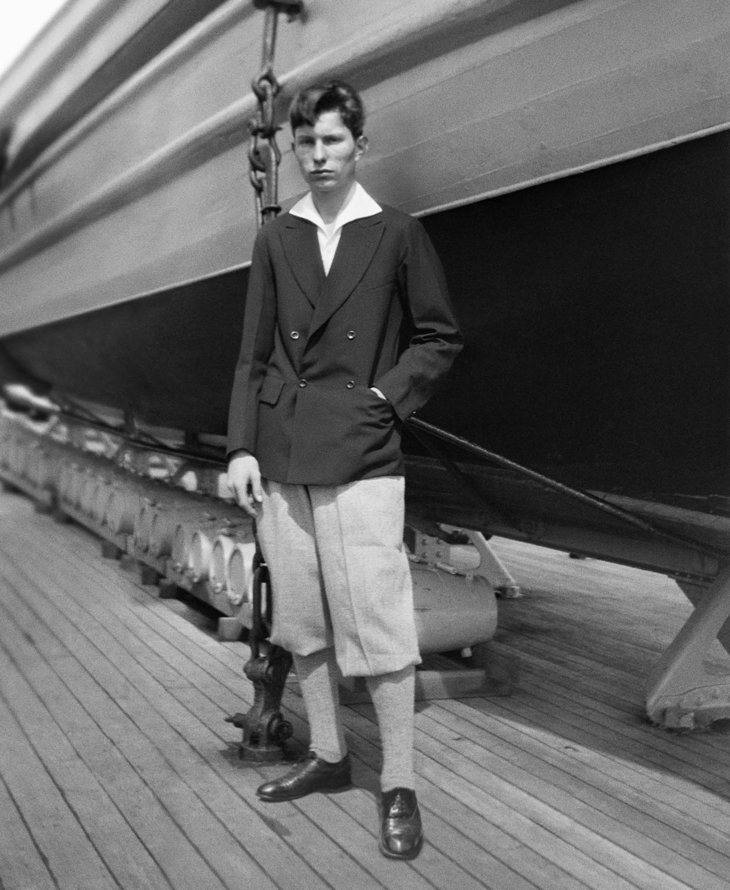
L. Ron Hubbard in 1928

From his birth in 1911 until 1950, L. Ron Hubbard was a failed student, a struggling writer, a low-ranking and oft-disciplined officer in the US Navy, and an occult practitioner. His early family life included following his father, a US Navy officer, to different bases around the world, and attending university for two years.

In 1933 Hubbard married his first wife Margaret "Polly" Grubb and they had two children. The couple struggled with finances as Hubbard wrote pulp fiction. Hubbard had a short but disastrous stint in the US Navy, then immersed himself into occult practices, abandoning his first wife and marrying a second wife, Sara Northrup.

By the end of 1949, Hubbard was making his first comments about what would become Dianetics.

== Early life ==
As the child of a Naval officer, Hubbard grew up in such diverse locales as Nebraska, Montana, the Pacific Northwest, Southern California, and D.C., with visits to Guam, Japan, and China.

L. Ron Hubbard was born in 1911 in Tilden, Nebraska, the only child of Ledora May (née Waterbury), who had trained as a teacher, and Harry Ross Hubbard, a former United States Navy officer. L. Ron was named after his maternal grandfather, Lafayette "Lafe" O. Waterbury. The Hubbard family was Methodist, though L. Ron would later describe his grandfather as a "devout atheist".

When Ron was two, the family moved from Nebraska to Montana. Hubbard's father worked as a manager and bookkeeper, first for a local theater and later for a coal company owned by his father-in-law.

The elder Hubbard re-enlisted in the Navy when the United States entered World War I in April 1917, while his mother Ledora May worked as a clerk for the state government. Harry Hubbard was promoted to Ensign in October 1918 and Lieutenant in November 1919. His posting aboard the USS Oklahoma in 1921 required his wife and son to relocate to the ship's home ports, first San Diego, then Seattle. Like many military families of the era, the Hubbards repeatedly relocated around the United States and overseas.

1917 photograph of Navy psychiatrist Joseph Cheesman Thompson. He accompanied the Hubbard family on a voyage in 1923 and reportedly interacted with Hubbard in 1930 and thereafter.

In May 1922, Harry Ross Hubbard incurred a debt to the Navy. In 1923, the Hubbards traveled by ship from Seattle to Washington, D.C. via the Panama Canal. Also on the voyage was Commander Joseph "Snake" Thompson, a U.S. Navy medical doctor and psychoanalyst. During his time in Washington, D.C., Hubbard was active in the Boy Scouts, earning the organization's Eagle Scout rank in 1924, two weeks after his 13th birthday. In 1926, Congress approved an act to credit Hubbard with $942.25.

After his father was posted to Guam, Hubbard and his mother traveled to Guam with a brief stop-over in a couple of Chinese ports. The teenage Hubbard recorded his impressions of the places he visited and disdained the poverty of the inhabitants of Japan and China, whom he described as "gooks" and "lazy [and] ignorant".

=== Education ===
The following year, Hubbard's father was posted to Puget Sound Naval Shipyard at Bremerton, Washington. Hubbard was enrolled at Union High School, Bremerton and later studied at Queen Anne High School in Seattle.

In 1927, Hubbard's father was sent to the U.S. Naval Station in Guam. Although Hubbard's mother also went to Guam, Hubbard himself did not accompany them but was placed in his grandparents' care in Helena, Montana, to complete his schooling. Hubbard attended Helena High School, where he contributed to the school paper, but was dropped from enrollment at Helena High due to failing grades.

After he failed the Naval Academy entrance examination, Hubbard was enrolled in a Virginia Preparatory School to prepare him for a second attempt. However, Hubbard complained of eye strain and was diagnosed with myopia, a diagnosis that precluded any future enrollment in the Naval Academy. As an adult, Hubbard would write to himself: "[Your eyes] became bad when you used them as an excuse to escape the naval academy". Following his myopia diagnosis, Hubbard was sent to the Woodward School in Washington, D.C., which would allow him to qualify for admission to George Washington University without having to sit for the university's entrance examination. He successfully graduated from Woodward in June 1930 and entered the university the following September, studying civil engineering.

Academically, Hubbard did poorly at GWU: his transcripts show he failed many courses including atomic physics, though later in life he would claim to have been a nuclear physicist. In September 1931, he was placed on probation due to poor grades, and in April 1932 he again received a warning for his lack of academic achievement. During his first year, Hubbard helped organize the university Glider Club and was elected its president. He also contributed to the university student newspaper as a reporter. During what would become Hubbard's final semester at GWU, he organized an ill-fated trip to the Caribbean for June 1932 to explore and film the pirate "strongholds and bivouacs of the Spanish Main" and to "collect whatever one collects for exhibits in museums". Amid multiple misfortunes, Hubbard's recruits took to burning him in effigy. Running low on funds, the ship's owners ordered it to return to Baltimore. Papers reported that the students had become stranded, with Hubbard's father Lt. Harry Ross Hubbard telling press he cabled $300 but his son would not accept the funds. Historian Lawrence Wright observed: "Hubbard demonstrated an impressive capacity to summon others to join him on what was clearly a shaky enterprise. Throughout his life he would enlist people—especially young people—in romantic, ill-conceived projects, often at sea, where he was out of reach of process servers."

Hubbard failed to return to university the following year. In the wake of 1932 San Ciprián hurricane, Hubbard's father volunteered him for the Red Cross relief effort, and on October 23, 1932, L. Ron Hubbard traveled to Puerto Rico. En route, Hubbard apparently "decided to abandon the Red Cross", instead opting to accompany a mineral surveyor in a futile bid to find gold.

== Interactions with D.C. psychiatrists ==
For much of the 1920s and 30s, L. Ron Hubbard lived in Washington D.C., and he would later claim to have interacted with multiple psychiatrists in the city. Hubbard described later encounters with navy psychiatrist Joseph Thompson, who he had first met seven years prior: "In 1930 I knew a fellow by the name of Commander Thompson. I had known him before, actually". As an adult, Hubbard called Thompson a "great man" who inspired Hubbard's interest in the mind, saying that through Thompson's friendship, "I attended many lectures given at naval hospitals and generally became conversant with psychoanalysis as it had been exported from Austria by Freud." Hubbard credited Thompson with the adage "If it's not true for you, it's not true", a purportedly-Buddhist maxim which was later incorporated into Scientology.

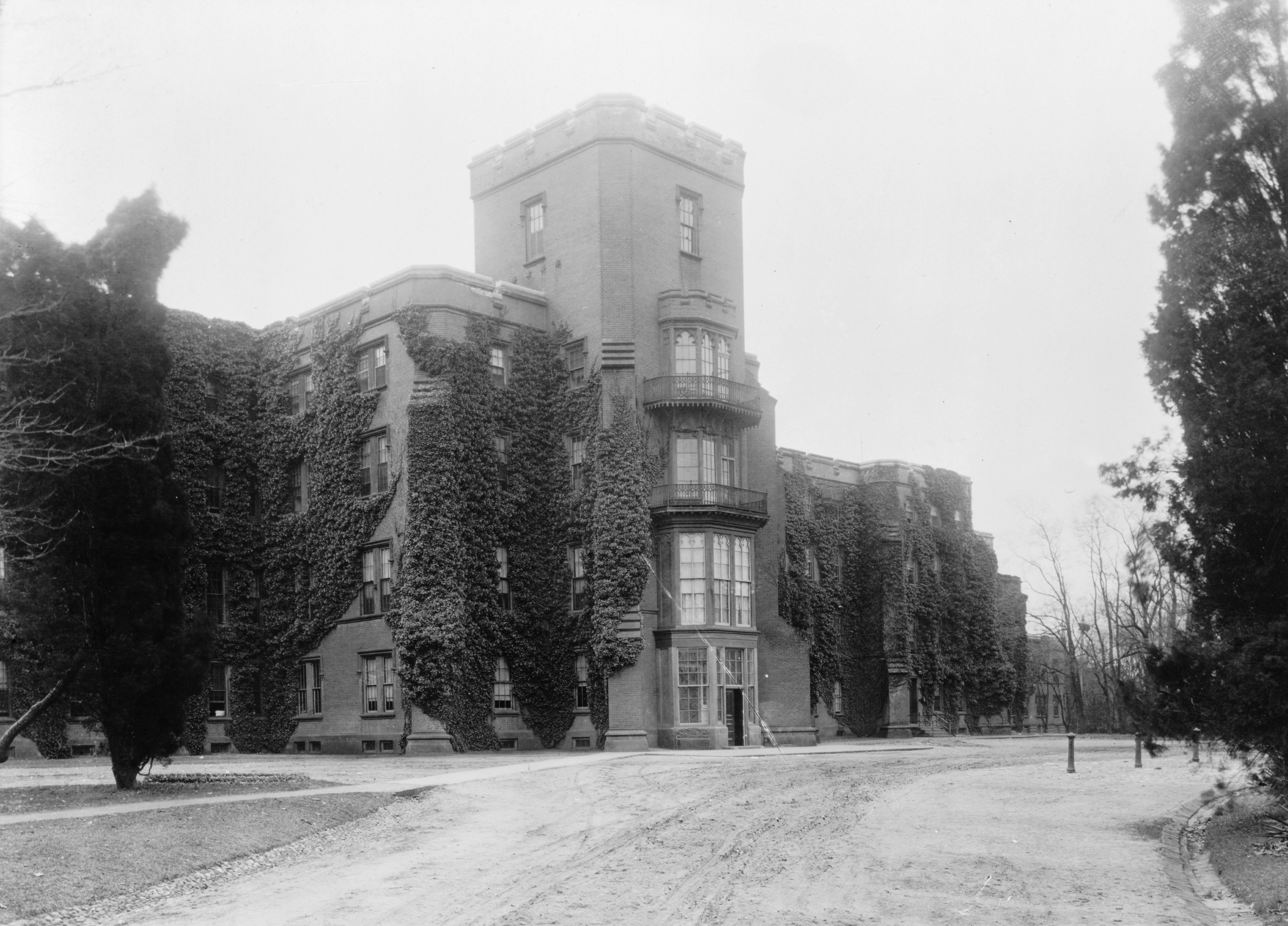
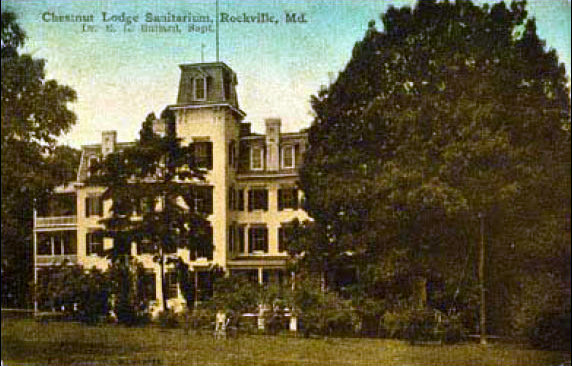
St. Elizabeth's psychiatric hospital in D.C. (top) and nearby Chestnut Lodge Sanitarium (bottom)

William Alanson White was an American neurologist and psychiatrist who served as superintendent of St. Elizabeths Hospital — a D.C. hospital Hubbard described as "where they sent the naval officers after they had received their fifth contradiction from the Navy Department". Hubbard later claimed to be trained by both Joseph Thompson and William Alanson White. In 1952, Hubbard recalled White was "a very fine man" who "had been a friend of mine for quite a while." In 1954, Hubbard recalled both White and Thompson had regarded Hubbard's athleticism and disinterest in psychology as signs of a good prognosis. In a lecture, Hubbard described consulting White about a theoretical calculation of human memory capacity, apparently during Hubbard's university days. Hubbard recalled that "he [White] used to see me every once in a while".

In a 1952 lecture, Hubbard would recall his interaction with staff and patients at a D.C. facility specializing in schizophrenia which he calls "Walnut Lodge" (presumably Chestnut Lodge):

there's a place by the name of Walnut Lodge. I... I... They don't see anything humorous in that, by the way; it’s Walnut Lodge. [...] They... they... they sent three people to see, to… to see me and every one of them was under treatment. And this was their staff. But anyway, very good people there, I'm sure, didn't happen to meet any. Have some fine patients though. Anyway, they... they treat only schizophrenia. And so they take only schizophrenics. Now how do they get only schizophrenics? Well, anybody sent to Walnut Lodge is a classified schizophrenic. And they take somebody who is a dementia praecox unclassified or a more modern definition, a mania-depressive and they take him from Saint Elizabeth's and they take him over to Walnut Lodge and he goes onto the books as a schizophrenic. Why? Because Walnut Lodge takes only schizophrenics.

== Early pulp fiction ==
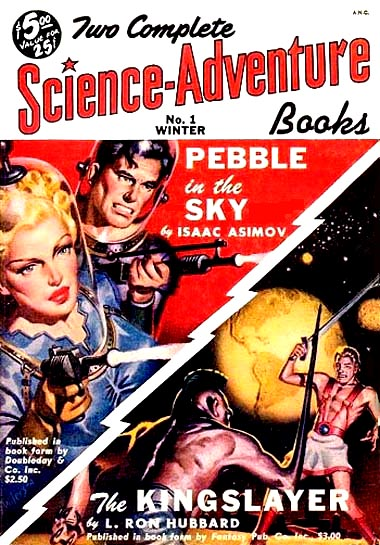
Hubbard's novella "The Kingslayer" was reprinted in Two Complete Science-Adventure Books in 1950 after its original publication in a 1949 Hubbard collection.

Hubbard returned from Puerto Rico to D.C. in February 1933. He renewed a relationship with a fellow glider pilot, Margaret "Polly" Grubb. The two were quickly married on April 13 amid speculation Grubb was pregnant – she did have a miscarriage shortly afterwards. On August 18, the Washington Daily News announced that Hubbard had found gold on his wife's family property; The story was picked up in the United Press wire service and reprinted nation-wide. In October, she was pregnant again. On May 7, 1934, she gave birth prematurely to a son who was named Lafayette Ronald Hubbard Jr., whose nickname was "Nibs". Their second child, Katherine May, was born on January 15, 1936.

Hubbard tried to write for mainstream publications, and six of his pieces were published commercially during 1932 to 1933. The going rate for freelance writers at the time was only a cent a word. In 1933, Hubbard published three pieces for the Sportsman Pilot and one article for the Washington Star; at the end of 1933, Polly calculated that Hubbard's total earnings that year was less than $100.

Hubbard soon found his niche, however, in the pulp fiction magazines, becoming a prolific and prominent writer in the genre. The pulp magazine Thrilling Adventures became the first to publish one of his short stories, in February 1934. Over the next six years, pulp magazines published many of his short stories under a variety of pen names, including Winchester Remington Colt, Kurt von Rachen, René Lafayette, Joe Blitz and Legionnaire 148. Hubbard produced more than 250 published works of fiction in his writing career. At his peak, he wrote “over 100,000 words a month.” He is remembered for his “prodigious output" and the "amazing speed at which he could produce copy.” He used a special electric IBM typewriter with extra keys for common words like ‘and’, ‘the’, and ‘but.’ Although he would become best known for his fantasy and science fiction stories, Hubbard wrote in a wide variety of genres, including adventure fiction, aviation, travel, mysteries, westerns and even romance.

In Spring 1936, the Hubbard family moved to Bremerton, Washington to live with Hubbard's aunts and grandmother, later settling in nearby South Colby. Hubbard spent an increasing amount of time in New York City, working out of a hotel room where his wife suspected him of carrying on affairs.

His first full-length novel, Buckskin Brigades, was published in 1937. The novel told the story of "Yellow Hair" a white man adopted into the Blackfeet tribe, with promotional material claiming the author had been a "bloodbrother" of the Blackfeet. The New York Times book review praised the book, writing "Mr. Hubbard has reversed a time-honored formula and has given a thriller to which, at the end of every chapter or so, another paleface bites the dust." After having authored "Murder at Pirate Castle", intended for serialization in Argosy magazine, in 1938, he was given a story credit on the Columbia Pictures movie serial The Secret of Treasure Island.

=== "Near-death experience" ===
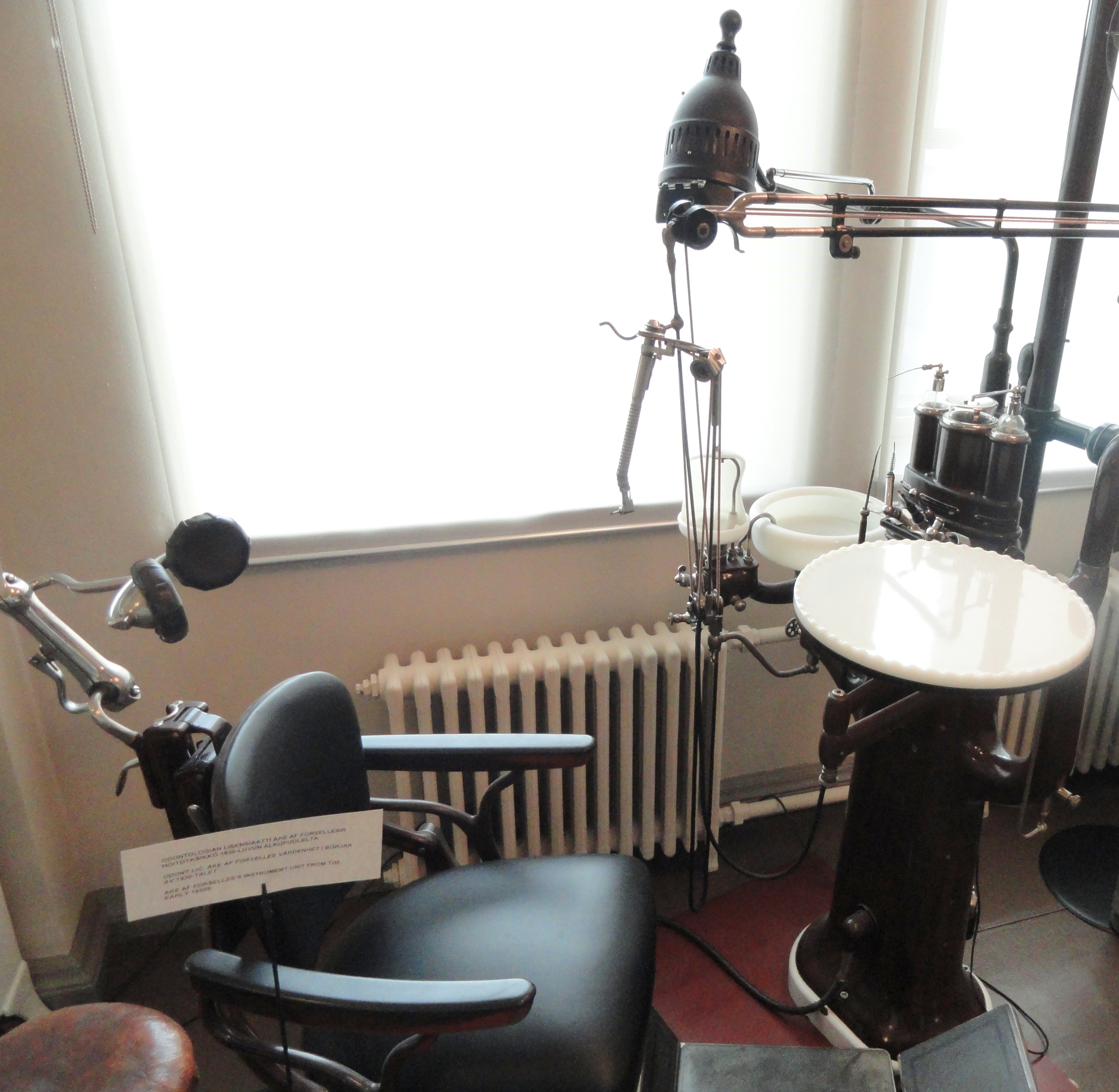
Museum recreation of a 1930s dentist office, the setting where Hubbard reported having a "near-death experience"

On New Year's Day, 1938, Hubbard reportedly underwent a dental procedure and reacted to the anesthetic gas used in the procedure. According to his account, this triggered a revelatory near-death experience. Allegedly inspired by this experience, Hubbard composed a manuscript, which was never published, with working titles of The One Command and Excalibur.

Arthur J. Burks, who read the manuscript in 1938 and suggested the title Excalibur, recalled that Hubbard had wanted to distill down all the wisdom of the world into a single word. They argued if it was "Be" or "Survive", though Burks recalled the book from there on had to do with survival. The theme of "survive" would be revisited in Dianetics. Burks also recalled the work discussing the psychology of a lynch mob. Hubbard would later cite Excalibur as an early version of Dianetics. Forrest J Ackerman, later Hubbard's literary agent, recalled that Hubbard told him "whoever read it either went insane or committed suicide. And he said that the last time he had shown it to a publisher in New York, he walked into the office to find out what the reaction was, the publisher called for the reader, the reader came in with the manuscript, threw it on the table and threw himself out of the skyscraper window."

According to Burks, Hubbard believed that Excalibur would "revolutionize everything" and that "it was somewhat more important, and would have a greater impact upon people, than the Bible." According to Burks, Hubbard "was so sure he had something 'away out and beyond' anything else that he had sent telegrams to several book publishers, telling them that he had written 'THE book' and that they were to meet him at Penn Station, and he would discuss it with them and go with whomever [sic] gave him the best offer." However, nobody bought the manuscript. Hubbard's failure to sell Excalibur depressed him; he told his wife in an October 1938 letter:

Sooner or later Excalibur will be published and I may have a chance to get some name recognition out of it so as to pave the way to articles and comments which are my ideas of writing heaven ... Foolishly perhaps, but determined none the less, I have high hopes of smashing my name into history so violently that it will take a legendary form even if all books are destroyed. That goal is the real goal as far as I am concerned.

=== Collaborations with John Campbell ===
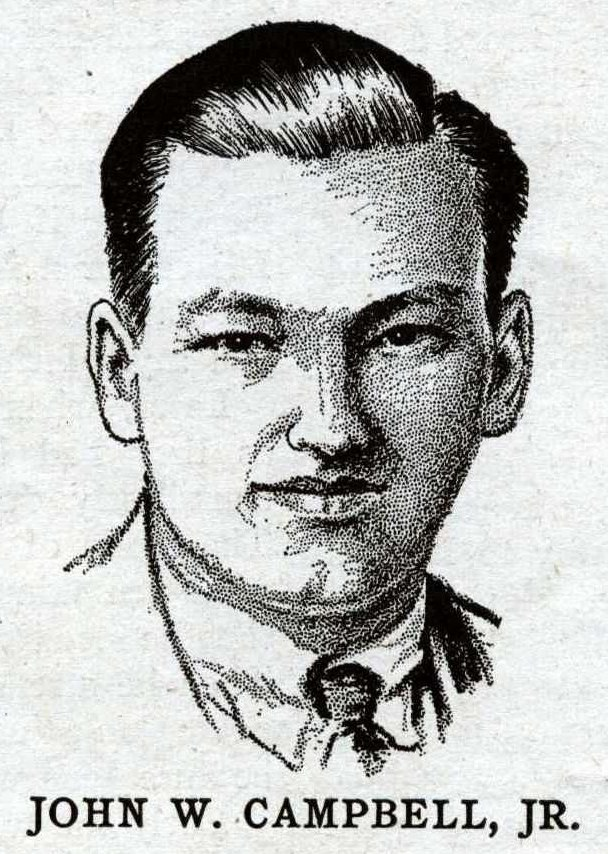
Hubbard's editor John W. Campbell, as depicted in the 1930s. Campbell promoted Hubbard's work from 1938 to 1950, when the pair split after Dianetics.

Hubbard began publishing Science Fiction with the magazine Astounding in 1938, and over the next decade he was a prolific contributor to both Astounding and the fantasy fiction magazine Unknown. He became a "highly idiosyncratic" writer of science fiction after being taken under the wing of editor John W. Campbell, who published many of Hubbard's short stories and also serialized a number of well-received novelettes that Hubbard wrote for Campbell's magazines Unknown and Astounding Science Fiction.

From April to May 1940, John Campbell's magazine Astounding Science Fiction serialized Hubbard's novel Final Blackout. In that work, set in a near-future ravaged by biological and nuclear war, a low-ranking British army officer rises to become dictator of the UK, defending it from decadent Americans. In July 1940, Campbell magazine Unknown published a psychological horror by Hubbard titled Fear; In that work, an ethnologist who recently penned an article dismissing tribal beliefs in spirits and demons as superstition is fired by his university when his article is interpreted as denouncing Christianity. When a friend suggests that the ethnologist has upset the very demons he doubted and now they are out to ruin his life, the ethnologist suddenly find himself alone on a sidewalk with no memory of how he got there. He begins seeing demons, ghouls and odd things around him and he becomes paranoid that his wife is being unfaithful. Finally, he discovers two dead bodies—his wife and his friend—and realizes he suffered a psychotic break and murdered them both. Fear was well-received, drawing praise from Ray Bradbury, Isaac Asimov, and others.

In November and December 1940, Unknown serialized Hubbard novel Typewriter in the Sky about a pulp fiction writer Horace Hackett who friend, Mike DeWolf, becomes trapped inside one of Hackett's stories. Hugh B. Urban compared Typewriter in the Sky character Horace Hackett's omnipotent abilities to Hubbard's subsequent ideas developed in the powerful spirit in Scientology doctrine, the Operating Thetan. Urban notes that the "theme of superior men or supermen" and "unlimited, even godlike power of the writer himself" in works like Typewriter in the Sky is continued in Dianetics and Scientology.

== Military career and repeated hospitalizations ==
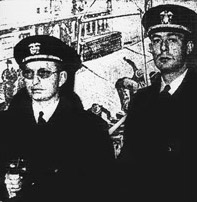
Hubbard (left) and Thomas S. Moulton in 1943

From July to December 1940, Hubbard and his wife traveled to Alaska and back aboard his ketch Magician. The ship's engine broke down only two days after setting off and Hubbard had to raise funds to repair it. making it back to Puget Sound on December 27, 1940. After returning from Alaska, Hubbard applied to join the United States Navy. His friend Robert MacDonald Ford sent a letter of recommendation describing Hubbard as "one of the most brilliant men I have ever known". Ford later said that Hubbard had written the letter himself: "I don't know why Ron wanted a letter. I just gave him a letter-head and said, 'Hell, you're the writer, you write it!'" His application was accepted and Hubbard was commissioned as a lieutenant junior grade in the United States Naval Reserve on July 19, 1941.

The day after Pearl Harbor, December 18, Hubbard was posted to the Philippines and departed the US bound for Australia. But while in Australia awaiting transport to the Philippines, Hubbard was suddenly ordered back to the United States after being accused by the US Naval Attaché to Australia of sending blockade-runner Don Isidro "three thousand miles out of her way". Hubbard would later claim that "for the next two or three years I'd run into officers, and they would say 'Hubbard? Hubbard? Hubbard? Are you the Hubbard that was in Australia?' And I'd say 'Yes.' And they's say 'Oh!' Kind of, you know, horrified, like they didn't know whether they should quite talk to me or not, you know? Terrible man".

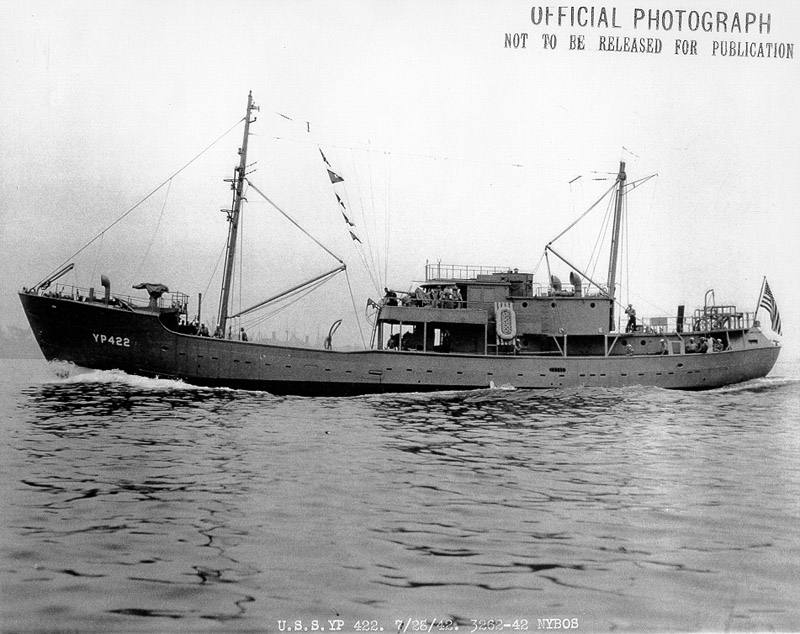
Hubbard's first command was a yard patrol boat in Massachusetts. He was relieved of command after complaints from the commandant of the Navy Yard.

After a brief stint censoring cables, Hubbard's request for sea duty was approved and he reported to a Massachusetts shipyard which was converting a trawler into a Yard Patrol gunboat. Hubbard was relieved of that command after the commandant of Boston Navy Yard wrote that he was "not temperamentally fitted for independent command".

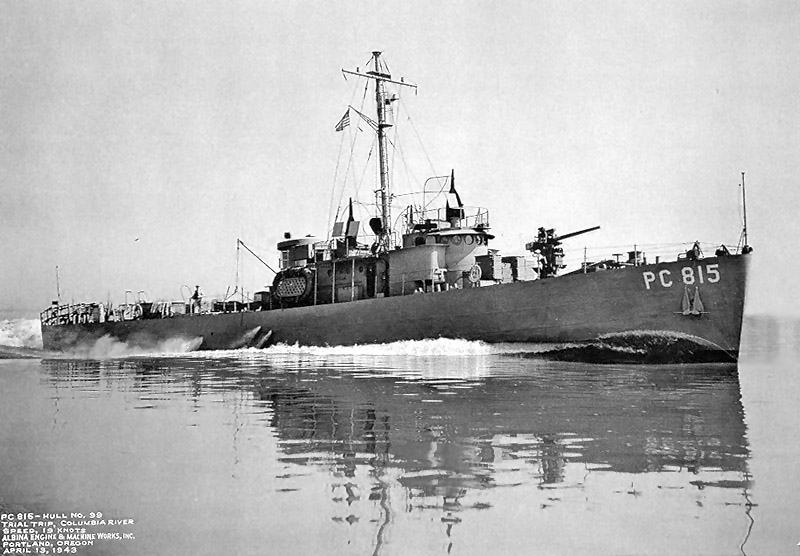
Hubbard's second and final command was a West Coast sub-chaser. After mistakenly dropping depth charges on a known magnetic deposit and opening fire on Mexican territory, Hubbard was relieved of command.

In 1943, Hubbard was posted to Portland, Oregon, to take command of a submarine chaser, the USS PC-815. On May 18, PC-815 sailed on her shakedown cruise, bound for San Diego. Only five hours into the voyage, Hubbard believed he had detected an enemy submarine. Hubbard spent the next 68 hours engaged in combat, until finally receiving orders to return to Astoria. An investigation concluded that "there was no submarine in the area" and Hubbard had likely mistaken a "known magnetic deposit" for an enemy sub. The following month, Hubbard unwittingly sailed PC-815 into Mexican territorial waters and conducted gunnery practice off the Coronado Islands, in the belief that they were uninhabited and belonged to the United States. The Mexican government complained and Hubbard was relieved of command. A report recommended he be assigned "duty on a large vessel where he can be properly supervised".

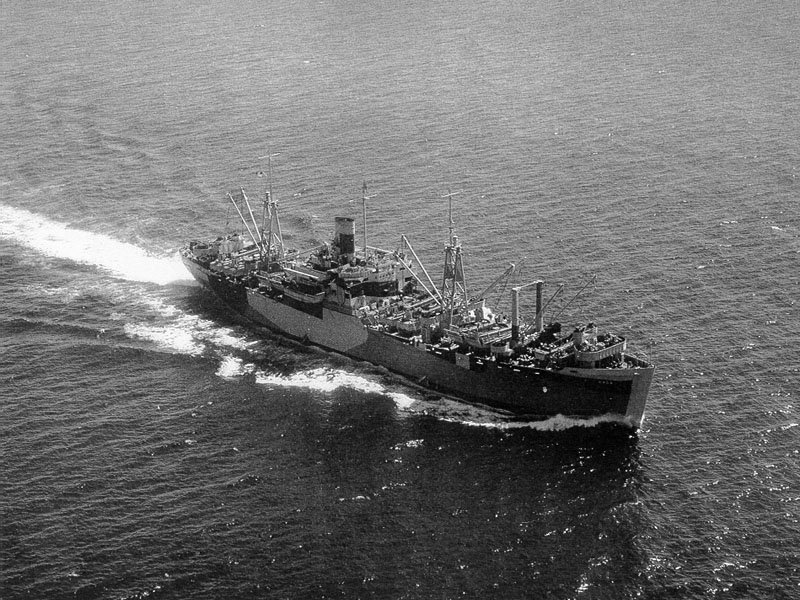
Hubbard served aboard the cargo ship USS Algol. The night he left the ship, he reported the discovery of a sabotage attempt.

In 1944, Hubbard was posted to Portland where USS Algol was under construction. The ship was commissioned in July and Hubbard served as the navigation and training officer. Hubbard requested, and was granted, a transfer to the School of Military Government in Princeton. The night before his departure, the ship's log reports that "The Navigating Officer [Hubbard] reported to the OOD [Officer On Duty] that an attempt at sabotage had been made sometime between 1530–1600. A coke bottle filled with gasoline with a cloth wick inserted had been concealed among cargo which was to be hoisted aboard and stored in No 1 hold. It was discovered before being taken on board. ONI, FBI and NSD authorities reported on the scene and investigations were started." Hubbard's estranged son Nibs would later speculate that his father had "apparently concealed a gasoline bomb on board the USS Algol in order to avoid combat". In contrast, Scientology critic Chris Owen argues "One cannot completely rule out his involvement, but the balance of factors suggests that [Hubbard] was not the culprit."

In June 1942, Navy records indicate that Hubbard suffered "active conjunctivitis" and later "urethral discharges". (Note: Owen argues that Hubbard likely suffered from venereal disease, writing: "Sulfa drugs were used in treatment but in excess could cause bloody urine, something which Hubbard's shipmate Thomas Moulton saw him passing on at least one occasion. Hubbard himself later complained about the amount of sulfa he had been fed in the Navy. Former Scientology spokesman Robert Vaughn Young claims that Hubbard's private papers refer to him having caught gonorrhoea from a girlfriend named Fern, which forced him to secretly take sulfa.") After being relieved of command of PC-815, Hubbard began reporting sick, citing a variety of ailments, including ulcers, malaria, and back pains. In July 1943, Hubbard was admitted to the San Diego naval hospital for observation—he would remain there for months, returning to active duty on October 8. Years later, Hubbard would privately write to himself: "Your stomach trouble you used as an excuse to keep the Navy from punishing you." On April 9, 1945, Hubbard again reported sick and was re-admitted to Oak Knoll Naval Hospital, Oakland. His complaints included "headaches, rheumatism, conjunctivitis, pains in his side, stomach aches, pains in his shoulder, arthritis, hemorrhoids". An October 1945 naval board found that Hubbard was "considered physically qualified to perform duty ashore, preferably within the continental United States". He was discharged from the hospital on December 4, 1945, and transferred to inactive duty on February 17, 1946. Hubbard would ultimately resign his commission after the publication of Dianetics, with effect from October 30, 1950.

== Occult practice ==
Hubbard underwent a turbulent period immediately after the war. According to his own account, he "was abandoned by family and friends as a supposedly hopeless cripple and a probable burden upon them for the rest of my days". His daughter Katherine presented a rather different version: his wife had refused to uproot their children from their home in Bremerton, Washington, to join him in California. Their marriage was by now in terminal difficulties and he chose to stay in California.

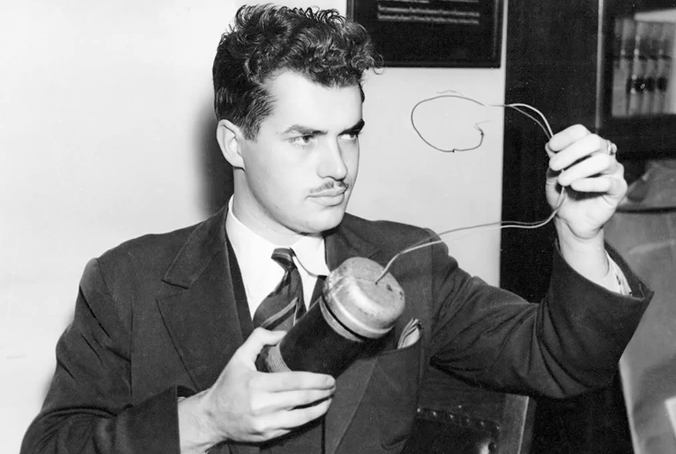
Jack Parsons in 1938

In August 1945, Hubbard moved into the Pasadena mansion of John "Jack" Whiteside Parsons. A leading rocket propulsion researcher at the California Institute of Technology and a founder of the Jet Propulsion Laboratory, Parsons led a double life as an avid occultist and Thelemite, follower of the English ceremonial magician Aleister Crowley and leader of a lodge of Crowley's magical order, Ordo Templi Orientis (OTO). He let rooms in the house only to tenants who he specified should be "atheists and those of a Bohemian disposition".

Hubbard befriended Parsons and soon became sexually involved with Parsons's 21-year-old girlfriend, Sara "Betty" Northrup.

Hubbard, whom Parsons referred to in writing as "Frater H", became an enthusiastic collaborator in the Pasadena OTO. The two men collaborated on the "Babalon Working", a sex magic ritual intended to summon an incarnation of Babalon, the supreme Thelemite Goddess. It was undertaken over several nights in February and March 1946 in order to summon an "elemental" who would participate in further sex magic. Author Richard Metzger explains that Parsons "used his 'magical wand'" or "jerked off" while Hubbard "scanned the astral plane". The "elemental" arrived a few days later in the form of Marjorie Cameron, who agreed to participate in Parsons's rites.

During this period, Hubbard authored a document which has been called the "Affirmations" (also referred to as the "Admissions"). They consist of a series of statements by and addressed to Hubbard, relating to various physical, sexual, psychological and social issues that he was encountering in his life. The Affirmations appear to have been intended to be used as a form of self-hypnosis with the intention of resolving the author's psychological problems and instilling a positive mental attitude. In her book, Janet Reitman called the Affirmations "the most revealing psychological self-assessment, complete with exhortations to himself, that [Hubbard] had ever made". Among the Affirmations:

- "Your eyes are getting progressively better. They became bad when you used them as an excuse to escape the naval academy. You have no reason to keep them bad."
- "Your stomach trouble you used as an excuse to keep the Navy from punishing you. You are free of the Navy."
- "Your hip is a pose. You have a sound hip. It never hurts. Your shoulder never hurts."
- "Your foot was an alibi. The injury is no longer needed."
- "You can tell all the romantic tales you wish. ... But you know which ones were lies ... You have enough real experience to make anecdotes forever. Stick to your true adventures."
- "Masturbation does not injure or make insane. Your parents were in error. Everyone masturbates."

Author Jon Atack has noted Hubbard seems to have a special interest in the tarot card The Empress and the Roman goddess 'Diana'. In 1946, using money from Jack Parsons, Hubbard purchased a boat named "Diane". In 1952, Hubbard named his daughter Diana. Later, Hubbard named a Sea Org vessel 'Diana'. Atack speculates "Dianetics" might be a 'double-entendre', and notes the existence of the earlier sex magick practice of Dianism.

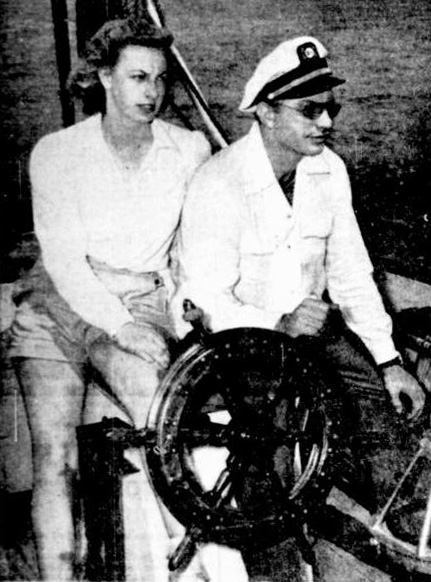
Hubbard and second wife Sara

Parsons, Hubbard and Sara agreed to set up a business partnership, "Allied Enterprises", in which they invested nearly their entire savings—the vast majority contributed by Parsons. The plan was for Hubbard and Sara to buy yachts in Miami and sail them to the West Coast to sell for a profit. Hubbard had a different idea; he wrote to the U.S. Navy requesting permission to leave the country "to visit Central & South America & China" for the purposes of "collecting writing material"—in other words, undertaking a world cruise. Aleister Crowley strongly criticized Parsons's actions, writing: "Suspect Ron playing confidence trick—Jack Parsons weak fool—obvious victim prowling swindlers". Parsons attempted to recover his money by obtaining an injunction to prevent Hubbard and Sara leaving the country or disposing of the remnants of his assets. They attempted to sail anyway but were forced back to port by a storm. A week later, Allied Enterprises was dissolved. Parsons received only a $2,900 promissory note from Hubbard and returned home "shattered". He had to sell his mansion to developers soon afterwards to recoup his losses.

On August 10, 1946, Hubbard married Sara, though he was still married to his first wife Polly. Polly only filed for divorce the following year, on April 14, 1947, on the grounds of "desertion and non-support", since neither she nor her children were obtaining any support from her absent husband. She had no idea that he had already committed bigamy by being married to another woman.

Hubbard's fellow writers were well aware of what had happened between him and Parsons. L. Sprague de Camp wrote to Isaac Asimov on August 27, 1946, informing him that Hubbard had moved to Florida with "man-eating- tigress" Sara. De Camp predicted Hubbard will soon "arrive in these parts... working the poor-wounded-veteran racket for all it's worth, and looking for another easy mark." De Camp relayed that mutual friend Robert Heinlein believed Hubbard "went to pieces morally as a result of the war", but de Camp dismissed that conclusion, arguing Hubbard "was always that way".

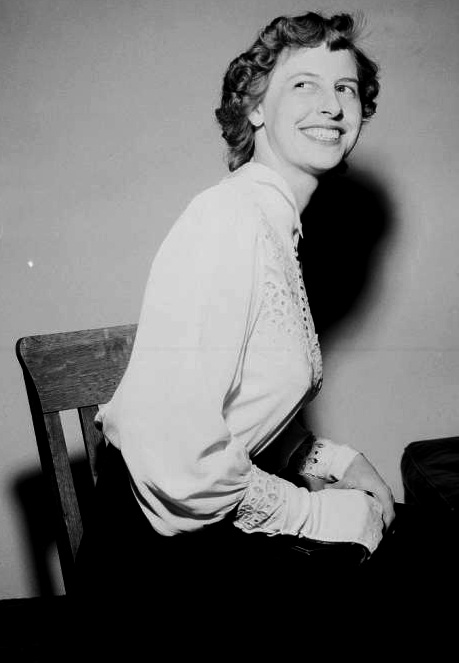
Hubbard's second wife Sara in 1951

=== Return to fiction ===
After Hubbard's wedding to Sara, the couple settled at Laguna Beach, California.where Hubbard took a short-term job looking after a friend's yacht Working from a trailer in a run-down area of North Hollywood, Hubbard resumed his fiction writing to supplement the small disability allowance that he was receiving as a war veteran. In August 1947, Hubbard returned to the pages of Astounding with a serialized novel "The End is Not Yet", about a young nuclear physicist who tries to stop a world takeover by building a new philosophical system. In October 1947, the magazine began serializing Ole Doc Methuselah, the first in a series about a "Soldier of Light". The Soldiers of Light are an organization of supremely skilled, extremely long-lived physicians whose prestige and authority are so great that they can go where they please and do very much as they please. At one point, a low-ranking character mentions that in his instructions for welcoming visiting dignitaries, Soldiers of Light are not mentioned. "Neither is God", is the answer he receives.

In February and March 1950, Campbell's Astounding serialized the Hubbard novel To the Stars. The protagonist is a young engineer who is kidnapped and taken aboard the interstellar trading starship. Six weeks of time aboard the ship amounts to roughly nine years experienced by those on Earth. When the protagonist finally returns home, he finds that his fiancee has aged and has trouble with her memory. Realizes his only home has become that of the starship, he takes command of the ship.

During his time in California, Hubbard began acting as a sort of amateur stage hypnotist or "swami".

=== Interactions with Savannah psychiatrists ===
However, he remained short of money and his son, L. Ron Hubbard Jr, testified later that Hubbard was dependent on his own father and Margaret's parents for money; Hubbard's writings, which he was paid at a penny per word, never garnered him any more than $10,000 prior to the founding of Scientology. He repeatedly wrote to the Veterans Administration (VA) asking for an increase in his war pension. Finally, in October 1947, he wrote to request psychiatric treatment:

After trying and failing for two years to regain my equilibrium in civil life, I am utterly unable to approach anything like my own competence. My last physician informed me that it might be very helpful if I were to be examined and perhaps treated psychiatrically or even by a psychoanalyst. Toward the end of my service I avoided out of pride any mental examinations, hoping that time would balance a mind which I had every reason to suppose was seriously affected. I cannot account for nor rise above long periods of moroseness and suicidal inclinations, and have newly come to realize that I must first triumph above this before I can hope to rehabilitate myself at all. ... I cannot, myself, afford such treatment.
Would you please help me?

The VA eventually did increase his pension, but his money problems continued. Beginning in June 1948, the nationally-syndicated wire service United Press ran a story on an American Legion-sponsored psychiatric ward in Savannah, Georgia, which sought to keep mentally-ill war veterans out of jail. That summer, Hubbard was arrested by the San Luis Obispo sheriff on a charge of petty theft for passing a fraudulent check.

In late 1948, Hubbard and his second wife Sara moved from California to Savannah, Georgia, where he would later claim to have worked as a volunteer in the psychiatric clinic. Hubbard claimed he had "processed an awful lot of Negroes". Hubbard later wrote of having observed a "Dr. Center" in Savannah:

I well recall a conversation I had with a Dr. Center in Savannah, Georgia, in 1949. It well expresses the arrogance and complete contempt for law and order of the psychiatrist.

A man had just called to inquire after his wife who was "under treatment" in Center’s hospital. Center asked him, "Do you have the money...? That’s right, thirty thousand... well you better get it or I’ll have to send your dear wife to the state institution and you know what will happen then!"

I was there doing work on charity patients the local psychiatrists wouldn’t touch. Center had forgotten I was in the room.

In letters to friends sent from Savannah, Hubbard began to make the first public mentions of what was to become Dianetics.

== Sources ==
- Atack, Jon (1990). A Piece of Blue Sky: Scientology, Dianetics and L. Ron Hubbard Exposed. Lyle Stuart Books. ISBN 081840499X. OL 9429654M.
- Christensen, Dorthe Refslund (2004). "Inventing L. Ron Hubbard: On the Construction and Maintenance of the Hagiographic Mythology of Scientology's Founder". In Lewis, James R.; Petersen, Jasper Aagaard (eds.). Controversial New Religions (1st ed.). Oxford University Press. pp. 227–258. doi:10.1093/019515682X.003.0011. ISBN 9780195156836. OCLC 53398162.
- Miller, Russell (1987). Bare-faced Messiah : The True Story of L. Ron Hubbard. Henry Holt and Company. ISBN 0805006540. OCLC 17481843. OL 26305813M.
- Pendle, George (2005). Strange Angel: The Otherworldly Life of Rocket Scientist John Whiteside Parsons. Harcourt. ISBN 015100997X. OCLC 55149255. OL 7362552M.
- Streeter, Michael (2008). Behind closed doors: the power and influence of secret societies. New Holland Publishers. ISBN 9781845379377. OCLC 231589690. OL 25446794M.
- Urban, Hugh B. (2011). The Church of Scientology: A History of a New Religion. Princeton University Press. ISBN 9780691146089.
- Whitehead, Harriet (1987). Renunciation and reformulation: a study of conversion in an American sect. Cornell University Press. ISBN 978-0-8014-1849-5. OCLC 14002616. OL 2722663M.
- Wright, Lawrence (2013). Going Clear: Scientology, Hollywood and the Prison of Belief. Alfred A. Knopf. ISBN 9780307700667. OL 25424776M.
