= Typewriter in the Sky =

1940 science fantasy novel by L. Ron Hubbard

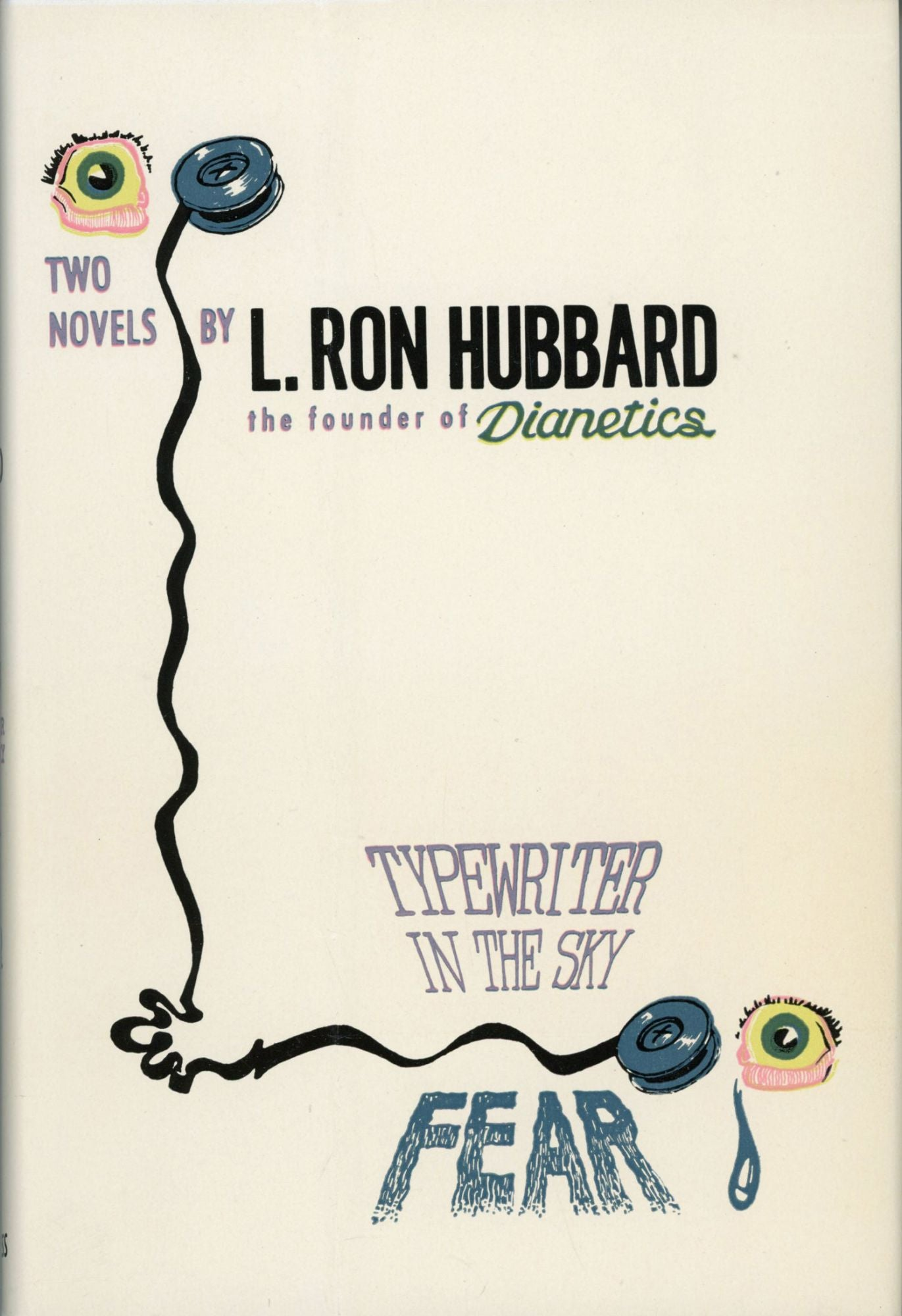
- First hardcover edition
- Author: L. Ron Hubbard
- Cover artist: David Kyle
- Language: English
- Subject: Science fantasy
- Publisher: Gnome Press
- Publication date: 1940 (serial format)
- Publication place: United States
- Media type: Hardcover
- Pages: 256
- ISBN: 0-88404-933-7
- OCLC: 33083581
- Dewey Decimal: 813/.52 22
- LC Class: PS3515.U1417 T96 1995
- Preceded by: The Ultimate Adventure
- Followed by: Final Blackout

Typewriter in the Sky is a science fantasy novel by American writer L. Ron Hubbard. The protagonist Mike de Wolf finds himself inside the story of his friend Horace Hackett's book. He must survive conflict on the high seas in the Caribbean during the 17th century, before eventually returning to his native New York City. Each time a significant event occurs to the protagonist in the story he hears the sounds of a typewriter in the sky. At the story's conclusion, de Wolf wonders if he is still a character in someone else's story. The work was first published in a two-part serial format in 1940 in Unknown Fantasy Fiction. It was twice published as a combined book with Hubbard's work Fear. In 1995 Bridge Publications re-released the work along with an audio edition.

Writers have placed the story within several different genres, including science fiction, a subgenre of science fiction called recursive science fiction, and fantasy. Masters of the Occult author Daniel Cohen noted the book contributed to Hubbard's reception among influential science fiction authors of the 1940s. It is regarded as classic science fiction by The Houghton Mifflin Dictionary of Biography in its entry on Hubbard, as well as by writer James Gunn, and publications including the Daily News of Los Angeles, and Chicago Sun-Times. Writers have placed Typewriter in the Sky within the Golden Age of Science Fiction. Authors Mike Resnick and Robert J. Sawyer classed the story within the science fiction subgenre recursive science fiction, and writer Gary Westfahl wrote that Hubbard may have been influenced by the 1921 Luigi Pirandello play within the recursive fantasy subgenre, Six Characters in Search of an Author. The book is listed in Fantasy: The 100 Best Books, and Rivals of Weird Tales: 30 Great Fantasy and Horror Stories from the Weird Fiction Pulps placed it among the best quality fantasy writing of the 20th century. Writers characterized the overarching theme within the book as dealing with an individual caught between two different worlds.

Typewriter in the Sky was generally well-received, and regular readers of Hubbard's stories at the time widely appreciated the work. Anthony Boucher and J. Francis McComas wrote in a 1951 review that the story was amusing though it could have used copy editing, and Groff Conklin described its concept as silly. The New York Times review the same year said it had a lively pace. Damon Knight was critical of the depiction of the protagonist's fate, and concluded the ending of the book made up for this defect. Books including The Classic Era of American Pulp Magazines and Pulp Culture: The Art of Fiction Magazines characterized the work as one of Hubbard's best stories. Adam Roberts pointed out Hubbard likely based the character of pulp fiction writer Horace Hackett on himself.

Subsequent to the story's publication, commentators have speculated that its influence impacted themes in later science fiction works. Paul Di Filippo wrote that the 1949 book What Mad Universe by Fredric Brown may have drawn from Hubbard's tale. Umberto Rossi asserted in a book on writer Philip K. Dick that Typewriter in the Sky likely influenced Dick's first published short story "Beyond Lies the Wub" (1951), in addition to his novel The Cosmic Puppets (1957). Harlan Ellison compared it to the 1985 film The Purple Rose of Cairo. Gary Westfahl likened the Typewriter in the Sky to the 2006 film Stranger than Fiction, going so far as to suggest the two had virtually an identical narrative.

== Plot summary ==
The story begins in Greenwich Village, New York. The main character, Mike de Wolf, is a struggling pianist. His friend, Horace Hackett, is an author and popular pulp fiction writer. Hackett is portrayed in the book as a skilled writer able to quickly produce voluminous amounts of material for pulp magazines. Hackett writes under stress, as he is facing a deadline. Hackett attempts to persuade his book publisher that he has almost finished writing his latest novel, while in actuality he has already depleted his advance payment prior to coming up with an idea for a story. Hackett's publisher pressures him and he rapidly decides to place his friend Mike as the central character in his story.

Hackett writes about Mike as the villain in his book, a swashbuckling adventure story. Mike enters the bathroom of Hackett's basement-level apartment, and hears the sound of someone typing on a typewriter. After electrocuting himself, Mike loses consciousness. He subsequently awakens to find himself on a beach in the year 1640, as a character within his friend's novel. He inspects himself to find he has a saber attached to his person, and is wearing strange attire.

Mike learns he is regarded in this world as the villain, Spanish Admiral Miguel de Lobo, a "pirate potboiler". He knows that the villains in stories written by Hackett often do not come to a favorable end, and is therefore anxious to exit the situation safely. Mike recognizes the specific work into which he has been transported: a tale by his friend called "Blood and Loot". Assuming the role of the villain, Mike realizes he must face off against a formidable opponent in the story, its protagonist named Tom Bristol.

The story takes place on the high seas in the Caribbean during the 17th century during a conflict among colonists. When a major event occurs, Mike hears the sound of a typewriter in the sky. Mike's reality literally changes each time the author makes a change to the story. Mike realizes that during times when he hears the audible sounds of the typewriter, his actions and words are not of his own volition, and when such sounds are absent he is able to make decisions for himself. Mike falls in love with a woman in the story, and grows frustrated after realizing that she is just another of Hackett's fictional creations. At the end of the work, Mike returns to New York, and is left with lingering doubts whether he is still a character in someone else's story. He muses whether a "typewriter in the sky" is creating the world. Mike looks up into the sky in search of this mystical device or its controller: "Abruptly Mike de Wolfe stopped. His jaw slackened a trifle and his hand went up to his mouth to cover it. His eyes were fixed upon the fleecy clouds which scurried across the moon. Up there – God? In a dirty bathrobe?"

== Publication history ==
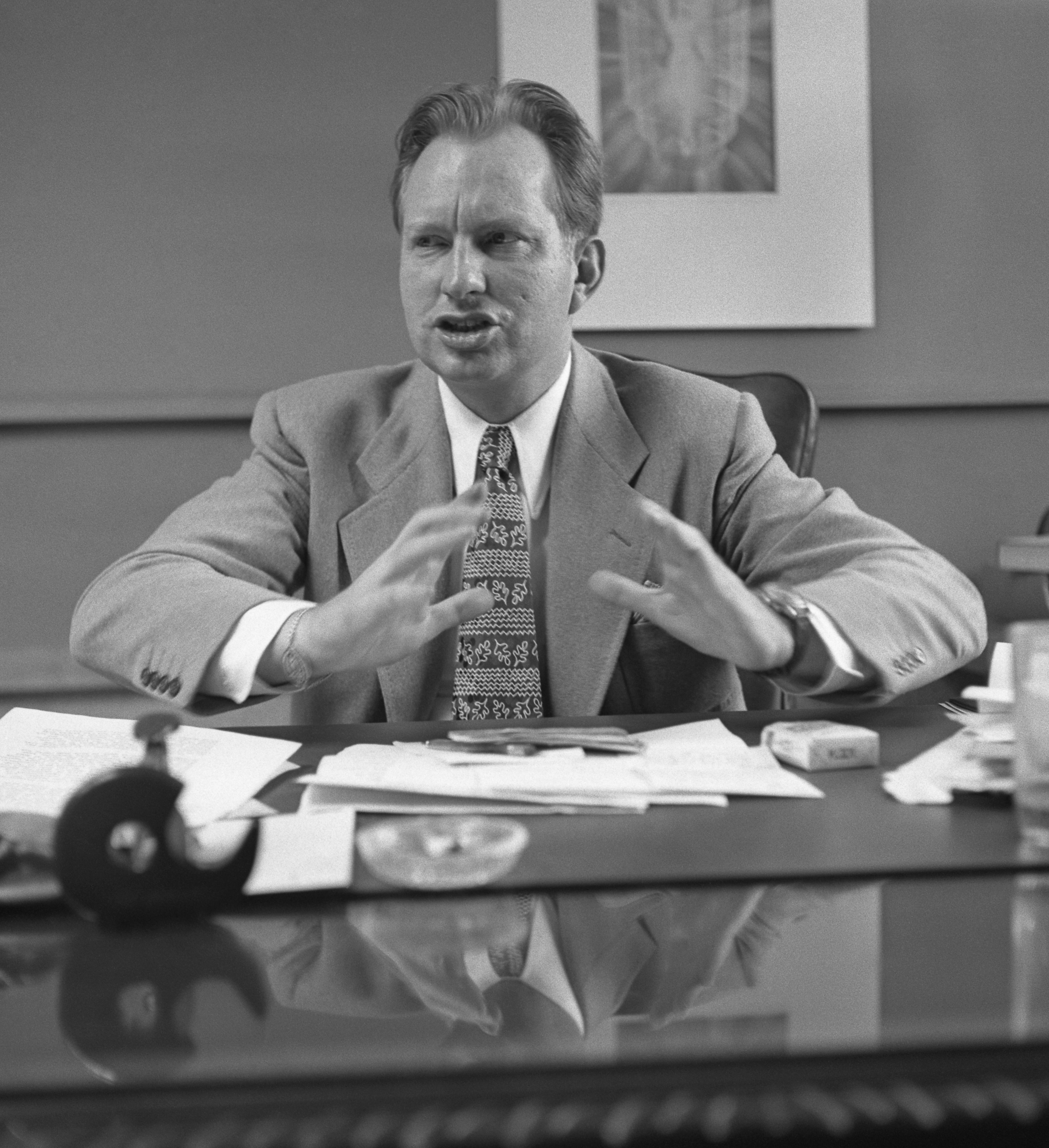
L. Ron Hubbard in 1950

Typewriter in the Sky was first published in 1940 as a two-part serial in Unknown Fantasy Fiction. The first part of the serial initially sold in 1940 for US$0.20. Master Storyteller: An Illustrated Tour of the Fiction of L. Ron Hubbard author William J. Widder said in an interview with Publishers Weekly that 1940 became an annus mirabilis for Hubbard, "a kind of year every author wants". Widder said in addition to Typewriter in the Sky, Hubbard's successful 1940 fiction stories published in Unknown included Fear, Final Blackout, and Death's Deputy. Hubbard first registered copyright for the book on May 15, 1951, and later renewed copyright on September 17, 1979. In 1951 it was published by Gnome Press as a combined work with Hubbard's Fear, and again in 1977 as Fear & Typewriter in the Sky, published by Popular Library. In the UK, the combined work was first published in 1952 as number 409 in the Cherry Tree Book series by Kemsley Newspapers Limited. The title for this 1952 UK edition was Typewriter in the Sky: An Adventure in Time.

Typewriter in the Sky was republished in 1995 by Bridge Publications. Science fiction author Kevin J. Anderson wrote an introduction to the 1995 edition of the book. The same year Bridge Publications released an audio edition read by Jim Meskimen. The audio edition was an abridged version of the story and ran two hours thirty minutes in duration. L. Ron Hubbard's literary agency Author Services Inc. announced that Typewriter in the Sky would be included in "a 12-volume series of 23 classic science fiction and fantasy novels and short stories" published by Easton Press of Norwalk, Connecticut in September 1995. In 2008 Heritage Auctions, Inc. valued a rare combined copy of Typewriter in the Sky and Fear at between US$100 and $200.

== Genres ==
Daniel Cohen wrote in Masters of the Occult (1971) that works including Typewriter in the Sky, Fear, and Slaves of Sleep "moved Hubbard into the front rank of science fiction writers of the late 1940s." Writing in Dream makers: The Uncommon Men and Women Who Write Science Fiction (1983), Charles Platt called the book, "one of Hubbard's most well-known and playful pieces". The St. James Encyclopedia of Popular Culture (2000) described Typewriter in the Sky and Fear as Hubbard's "most famous stories" in the genre of science fiction. The Houghton Mifflin Dictionary of Biography (2003) in its biographical entry on L. Ron Hubbard characterized Typewriter in the Sky and Slaves of Sleep among classics in science fiction, as did The Riverside Dictionary of Biography (2004). The book was similarly described as a science fiction classic by author James Gunn in his book The Witching Hour (2003), and media publications including the Daily News of Los Angeles, and the Chicago Sun-Times. Eric Solstein and Gregory Moosnick placed the work within the Golden Age of Science Fiction.

In the book Resnick at Large (2003), authors Mike Resnick and Robert J. Sawyer cited Typewriter in the Sky as an example of the subgenre of science fiction – recursive science fiction, described as "science fiction about science fiction". In the work, The Greenwood Encyclopedia of Science Fiction and Fantasy: Themes, Works, and Wonders (2005), Gary Westfahl commented, "Recursive fantasy fiction – that is, a fantasy about writing fantasy – is scarce. Luigi Pirandello's play Six Characters in Search of an Author (1921) offered a non-genre model." Westfahl noted that Hubbard's book was "an early genre example, perhaps inspired by Pirandello". Umberto Rossi wrote in The Twisted Worlds of Philip K. Dick (2011) that Typewriter in the Sky included a game in the form of metafiction within its plot development.

Typewriter in the Sky is well regarded within the genre of fantasy; author David Wingrove noted in The Science Fiction Source Book (1984), "His [Hubbard's] best work is outstanding within the pulp tradition: "Typewriter in the Sky" is a fine fantasy about a man who gets trapped within a story written by a pulp writer". The book is listed in Fantasy: The 100 Best Books (1988), by James Cawthorn and Michael Moorcock. Robert E. Weinberg, Stefan R. Dziemianowicz, and Martin Harry Greenberg write in Rivals of Weird Tales: 30 Great Fantasy and Horror Stories from the Weird Fiction Pulps (1990) that Typewriter in the Sky is classed among stories published in Unknown which "still rank as some of the best fantasy produced in this century". A review of the book upon its 1995 re-release in the Spartanburg Herald-Journal characterized the story as both fantasy and science fiction, calling it a "classic science fiction fantasy adventure"; and placed it within the Golden Age of Science Fiction. St. James Guide to Science Fiction Writers (1996) called the story "Hubbard's most successful fiction". Marco Frenschkowski wrote in a 1999 article for the Marburg Journal of Religion in a bibliography of L. Ron Hubbard, and called Typewriter in the Sky: " Classic fantasy tale about a man who discovers he is part of someone else's imagination." Writing in A Short History of Fantasy (2009), authors Farah Mendlesohn and Edward James characterized the book as "The best of Hubbard's stories" and noted that it "is better seen as a rationalized fantasy". In a 2009 article on Hubbard's writings, Booklist classed Typewriter in the Sky and Fear as among classics within science fiction and fantasy.

== Themes ==
Alexei Panshin and Cory Panshin wrote in The World Beyond the Hill: Science Fiction and the Quest for Transcendence (1989), "Typewriter in the Sky can be understood as an old-fashioned alien exploration story, with a new basis of transfer from one world to another – the thoughts of an outside intelligence." Writing in a 1992 article for the journal Science Fiction Studies, David N. Samuelson pointed out that the literary conceit of "assuming human beings are necessary for the universe we know" predated Typewriter in the Sky as well as What Mad Universe (1949) by Fredric Brown. Authors Lionel Fanthorpe and Patricia Fanthorpe wrote in The World's Most Mysterious People (1998) that Hubbard accomplished a difficult task of writing about two different worlds at the same time, "even through the medium of fiction Hubbard succeeds in posing deep metaphysical questions about the mind's interpretation of experiential data, and its response to the questions about the nature of being." Writing in The Encyclopedia of Fantasy (1999), John Clute and John Grant characterized the work as the best of Hubbard's stories in the Arabian-fantasy theme. In their book Mysteries and Secrets of Time (2007), Fanthorpe and Fanthorpe place the book within the sub-topic of "the idea of being caught inside someone else's dream". In his 2011 book The Twisted Worlds of Philip K. Dick, author Umberto Rossi analyzed Hubbard's story and called it a parody intended to spoof the experiences of hack writers.

In her 1987 monograph work on Scientology Renunciation and Reformulation: a Study of Conversion in an American Sect, Harriet Whitehead wrote that the book helped Hubbard build on experience writing about a theme of "a hidden reality subjacent to the apparent one". Bent Corydon, author of L. Ron Hubbard, Messiah or Madman?, named a chapter of the biography "Typewriter in the Sky". In their work Encyclopedia of New Age Beliefs (1996), authors John Ankerberg and John Weldon observed, "compare Scientology theory with L. Ron Hubbard's science-fiction works, e.g., Ole Doc Methusala, Slaves of Sleep, Death's Deputy, The Final Blackout, The Dangerous Dimension, The Tramp, Fear, King Slayer, and Typewriter in the Sky." In his 2011 work The Church of Scientology: A History of a New Religion, Hugh B. Urban compared Typewriter in the Sky character Horace Hackett's omnipotent abilities to Hubbard's subsequent ideas developed in the powerful spirit in Scientology doctrine, the Operating Thetan. Urban wrote: "perhaps the most striking element in Hubbard's early fiction that reappears in his later Scientology writings is his emphasis on the unlimited, even godlike power of the writer himself. For the writer has the all-creative power to generate entire universes out of his own imagination, to populate them, and to destroy them. The clearest example of this divine power of the author appears in Typewriter in the Sky (1940)". Urban notes that the “theme of superior men or supermen” in works like Typewriter in the Sky is continued in Dianetics and Scientology.

== Reception ==
Writing in the October 1951 issue of The Magazine of Fantasy and Science Fiction, Anthony Boucher and J. Francis McComas wrote favorably of Typewriter in the Sky, and characterized it as "an entertaining adventure-farce badly in need of editing". Reviewing the same edition, Groff Conklin termed it "a silly idea inexpertly carried out". The New York Times reviewer Villiers Gerson found Typewriter to be "an ironic and jaunty adventure story." Damon Knight gave the book a mixed review, commenting, "The problem [of how de Wolf can 'change the story and avert his doom'] is a tough one, and Hubbard does not so much solve it as slide around it.... This weakness is more than compensated for by the ending of the story itself – Three immortal lines".

In a 1988 article for the Journal of the Fantastic in the Arts, Harlan Ellison called the work "great pulp fiction I can still reread with pleasure". George Malko noted in Scientology: The Now Religion (1970) that Typewriter in the Sky was "eagerly welcomed by devoted fans". Michael Ashley wrote in Who's Who in Horror and Fantasy Fiction (1978), "Typewriter in the Sky (1940) is a rollicking farce of a man written into another's story". Everett F. Bleiler found it to be "a routine adventure story carried through competently, with a good central idea". Janrae Frank of The Washington Post commented, "Much of his best work of the '40s and '50s, Fear, Slaves of Sleep, Typewriter in the Sky, is written in exactly the same style and won reader polls at the time."

In his biography of the author, Bare-Faced Messiah (1987), Russell Miller characterized Typewriter in the Sky as one of Hubbard's works which "would come to be regarded as classics", along with Fear and Final Blackout. In a biography of Hubbard written by Kent State University professor Donald M. Hassler in The New Encyclopedia of Science Fiction (1988), he noted, "Typewriter in the Sky (1940/1951), which anticipates plot gimmicks now popular among experimental metafictionists, ought to be taken seriously by the critics who will evaluate his strange genius". In a review upon the 1995 re-release of the book, Ann Patterson-Rabon of the Spartanburg Herald-Journal concluded: "A short novel, 'Typewriter' is a perfect afternoon read: quick, fun and only as deep as you care to go." Sandy Bauers of Knight News Service called the 1995 audio publication of the work "swashbuckling fun".

Peter Haining wrote in The Classic Era of American Pulp Magazines, "Typewriter in the Sky, which first appeared in Unknown in 1940, is widely considered to be one of his best works." Pulp Culture: The Art of Fiction Magazines by Frank M. Robinson and Lawrence Davidson, listed Typewriter in the Sky among Hubbard's "best work". A 2005 Publishers Weekly review of Hubbard's novel The Ultimate Adventure wrote that it "may not measure up to the best of Hubbard's work from the pulp era", citing Typewriter in the Sky and Fear as higher quality novels. British writer Adam Roberts wrote of the book in his biography of Hubbard for the edited work Fifty Key Figures in Science Fiction, calling it a "neatly self-reflexive" story. Roberts noted the character of pulp fiction writer Horace Hackett was "a Hubbardian self-portrait".

== Influence ==
In a review of the book What Mad Universe (1949), Paul Di Filippo of Sci Fi Weekly posited that the book's author Fredric Brown may have been influenced by Hubbard's story. Umberto Rossi wrote in The Twisted Worlds of Philip K. Dick (2011) that writer Philip K. Dick was likely influenced by Typewriter in the Sky. Rossi noted Typewriter in the Sky came out in a paperback format in 1951, and a year later Dick succeeded in getting his first short story, the tale "Beyond Lies the Wub" published. Rossi said Typewriter in the Sky was "the text that admittedly inspired" The Cosmic Puppets (1957) by Philip K. Dick. In the book Harlan Ellison's Watching (1989), by Harlan Ellison, Typewriter in the Sky is compared to Purple Rose of Cairo, "I bet if L. Ron Hubbard had written Purple Rose of Cairo they'd have given it a Hugo ... I mean, it is sort of a hip, updated version of Typewriter in the Sky." Gary Westfahl quoted Hubbard's work in a book of noteworthy science fiction quotations, Science Fiction Quotations: From the Inner Mind to the Outer Limits (2005).

Writing for Locus Online, Gary Westfahl compared the screenplay of the 2006 film Stranger than Fiction to Hubbard's story, and commented, "In taking its premise into this unlikely territory, the film provides a fascinating contrast to a classic fantasy novella with a similar theme, L. Ron Hubbard's Typewriter in the Sky (1940). A lawsuit alleging that screenwriter Zach Helm improperly stole his story from Hubbard could accurately state that both works have the same basic plot." In a review of Stranger than Fiction for Cinematical, Jette Kernion similarly compared the film's plot to Hubbard's story, noting that the two stories share "some strikingly similar plot elements". In a fictional recounting of Hubbard's accomplishments, followers of Scientology cite Typewriter in the Sky among works which "inspired millions", in the Obie Award-winning 2007 satirical musical written by Kyle Jarrow, A Very Merry Unauthorized Children's Scientology Pageant. Westfahl subsequently likened the 2009 television series FlashForward to the story, writing: "one can even regard FlashForward as a form of metaliterature involving characters in a work of fiction who discover that they are characters in a work of fiction being pushed toward a particular fate, with predecessors that include L. Ron Hubbard's Typewriter in the Sky (1940) and the film Stranger Than Fiction (2006)".
