= Dead Men Kill =

1934 mystery novel by L. Ron Hubbard

Dead Men Kill is a pulp fiction mystery/zombie horror novel written by L. Ron Hubbard. It was first published in 1934 in the July issue of Thrilling Detective magazine.

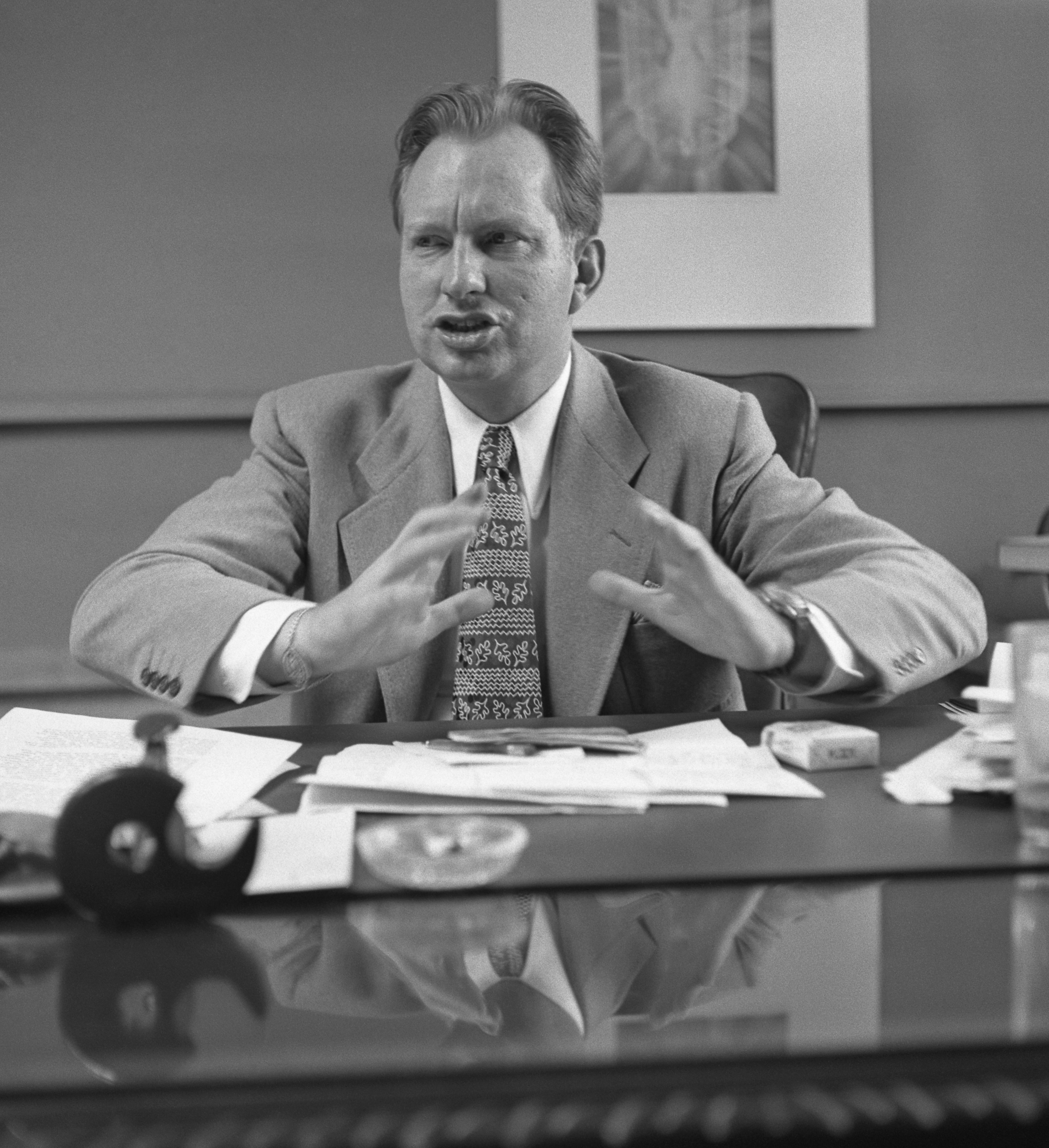
L. Ron Hubbard, the author of "Dead Men Kill"

== Plot ==
Detective Terry Lane has little to go on to unravel an unusual mystery: a blue grey glove and a Haitian pharmacy bill for a strange drug. As some of the city's most respected citizens inexplicably die from what appears to be zombie attacks, Lane finds himself to be a recipient of death threats.

To complicate matters, a nightclub singer claims to have information that could help Lane solve the case. Lane becomes suspicious of her motives but acts on her tip against his better judgement. His initial intuition proves to be correct, but he finds himself sealed in a coffin en route to the next murder - his own.

== Publication history ==
Dead Men Kill was written and published in the July 1934 issue of the pulp magazine "Thrilling Detective."

Dead Men Kill is from the Golden Age series, which Galaxy Press started re-publishing in 2008. The book has been re-released in paperback, and as a full-cast audio book.

== Publications ==
Hubbard, L. Ron (2008). Dead Men Kill. Galaxy Press LLC. ISBN 978-1592122639.
