= The Science Fiction Source Book =

Book by David Wingrove

- Author: David Wingrove
- Language: English
- Genre: Reference
- Publication date: 1984

The Science Fiction Source Book is a book by David Wingrove published in 1984. It is a reference work which grades over 2500 books by 880 authors by giving them ratings of up to 5 stars in the categories of Readability, Characterization, Idea Content and Literary Merit.

== Reception ==
Dave Langford reviewed The Science Fiction Source Book for White Dwarf #59, and stated that "This is a game with no ending. The Sourcebook is enormous fun for browsing in, raising your eyebrows at, and violently disagreeing with. Just don't trust those stars!"

== Reviews ==
- Review by Neil Barron (1984) in Fantasy Review, August 1984
- Review by Don D'Ammassa (1984) in Science Fiction Chronicle, #60 September 1984
