= What Mad Universe =

1949 novel by Fredric Brown

- Dust-jacket from the first edition
- Author: Fredric Brown
- Language: English
- Genre: Science fiction
- Publisher: E. P. Dutton
- Publication date: 1949
- Publication place: United States
- Media type: Print (hardback)
- Pages: 255
- OCLC: 1030471

What Mad Universe is a science fiction novel, written in 1949 by the American author Fredric Brown. It satirizes many of the conventions of American "pulp" magazine science-fiction of the 1940s, while incorporating such stereotyped elements into a coherent alternate universe, valid on its own terms.

== Synopsis ==
Keith Winton is an editor for a science fiction magazine, working during the late 1940s, when genre fiction magazines have not yet given over to TV shows. With his glamorous co-worker Betty (an employee of the Romantic Stories magazine), on whom he has an undeclared crush, he visits his boss in his estate in the Catskills on the same day as the scheduled launch of an experimental rocket carrying a high-voltage generator that would have been seen discharging on the Moon's surface. Betty has to go back to New York. The rocket fails to launch, and its generator crashes on the spot that Keith is standing on, causing a massive energy discharge that allows him to physically 'shift' through dimensions.

Keith is taken to a strangely similar parallel universe. At a glance, the streets look the same, the radio broadcasts the Benny Goodman Orchestra, and people wear the same kind of clothes. But there are many incongruous elements in this new reality. Keith is surprised to see that credits have replaced dollars, and lunar natives are vacationing on Earth.

To his cost, he inadvertently discovers that coin collecting could cause one to be suspected of being an Arcturian spy – and since Arcturians possess mental powers and intend to exterminate humanity, any such suspicion could put one at risk of being shot on the spot. Managing to escape the spy scare, he learns that New York has no night life and that wandering the completely dark Times Square could lead to a fatal encounter with entities called Nighters. He discovers that, even though interstellar spaceflight and war with aliens have become a daily reality, science fiction is still being written and read. He reasons that his best way of making a living would be as a science fiction writer, but this places him under grave suspicion by the WBI (World Bureau of Investigation) and at heightened risk of being summarily shot as a spy.

As a science fiction editor, Keith despised space opera, but now finds himself living in a "Mad Universe" where the most typical aspects of that subgenre are an actual, daily reality. At first inclined to regard all of this as a bit far-fetched, he is reprimanded by this world's version of Betty: "Do you think the danger of all humanity being exterminated is a matter for joke?" In order to have any hope of getting back to his own world, he has to get in touch with the impossibly 'larger than life' hero who leads humanity's struggle against Arcturians, helped by an "artificial brain" sidekick Mekky. To do that, he must return to the dangerous streets of nighttime New York.

Winton makes contact with the underworld – which includes both submachine gun-toting gangsters and Proximans who can burn people to cinder by focusing their red lens of an eye – establishes a partnership with a desperate criminal, steals the private spaceship of a rich United States Senator, learns space navigation overnight, and narrowly avoids being blasted by a naval ship for having entered a restricted sector of space, before finally getting involved in a desperate last-minute plan to defend the Solar System and Earth against an alien superweapon. In the end, Winton has to embark on an almost-suicidal single-handed attack on the alien ship.

== Reception ==
Boucher and McComas named What Mad Universe the best SF novel of 1949, citing its "blend of humor, logic, terror and satire". P. Schuyler Miller praised the novel as a "gleeful mulligan stew of well tried ingredients dished up with that all-important difference in flavor." C. Ben Ostrander reviewed the 1978 reprint of What Mad Universe in The Space Gamer No. 18. Ostrander commented that "Brown tells us something about ourselves as science fiction readers with this novel. The message is as true today as it was in 1949 when it was first published."

Ward Smythe noted that "Cervantes sought to write a satire on the Chivalric romances, a very common literary genre in his time. He ended up creating Don Quixote, one of the finest of the fictional Knights Errant (the best of them, in the view of many). Frederic Brown's satire of Space Opera is a satire, all right – but still, it is also among the finest examples of Space Opera".

The character of Keith Winton would appear as "L. Keith Winton", founder of "the Church of Immortology" (a parody of L. Ron Hubbard and Scientology) in Kim Newman's Anno Dracula series.

The novel is cited in Lawrence Block's The Burglar Who Met Fredric Brown (2022), which incorporates an alternate universe plot of its own, in direct homage to What Mad Universe.

== Sources ==
- Tuck, Donald H. (1974). The Encyclopedia of Science Fiction and Fantasy. Chicago: Advent. p. 69. ISBN 0-911682-20-1.
