= Final Blackout =

1948 SF novel by L. Ron Hubbard

- Dust-jacket from the first edition
- Author: L. Ron Hubbard
- Illustrator: Betty Wells Halladay
- Cover artist: Betty Wells Halladay
- Language: English
- Genre: Science fiction
- Publisher: The Hadley Publishing Co.
- Publication date: 1948
- Publication place: United States
- Media type: Print (hardback)
- Pages: 154
- OCLC: 18604884

Final Blackout is a dystopic science fiction novel by American writer L. Ron Hubbard. The novel is set in the future and follows a man known as "the Lieutenant" as he restores order to England after a world war. First published in serialized format in 1940 in the science fiction magazine Astounding Science Fiction, Final Blackout was published in book form in 1948 by The Hadley Publishing Co. Author Services Inc. published a hardcover edition of the book in 1988, and in 1989 the Church of Scientology-affiliated organization Bridge Publications said that a film director named Christopher Cain had signed a contract to write and direct a movie version based on the book.

The novel was generally well received by literature critics, and is seen as an early classic of the Golden Age of Science Fiction. It has received positive mention in the Chicago Sun-Times and the Daily News of Los Angeles, and has been used in a science-fiction writing class at California State Polytechnic University, Pomona.

== Publication history ==
The story appeared in print in a 3-part serialized format, beginning with the April 1940 issue of Astounding Science Fiction. Final Blackout was first published in book form in 1948 by The Hadley Publishing Co. in an edition of 1,000 copies and with a new preface by Hubbard. The book was re-released in a hardcover format in 1988 by the Church of Spiritual Technology subsidiary company Author Services Inc.

In 1989, Young Guns film director Christopher Cain optioned the rights to Final Blackout and developed a script for a possible film-version of the book. The film was not made. According to the Church of Scientology company Bridge Publications, Cain signed a contract to write a screenplay based on the book and to direct the film. "The book is massive in scope and transcends time. It's a powerful look at the idiocy and futility of war. I look forward to making 'Final Blackout' into a major movie", said Cain in a press release put out by Bridge Publications. An audiobook was released by Bridge Publications in 1991 and read by Planet of the Apes actor Roddy McDowall, who also voiced audiobook versions of Hubbard's novels Battlefield Earth and Fear.

== Plot ==
A lieutenant (known in the book only as "The Lieutenant") becomes dictator of England after a world war. The Lieutenant leads a ragtag army fighting for survival in a Europe ravaged by 30 years of atomic, biological and conventional warfare. As a result of the most recent war, a form of biological warfare called soldier’s sickness has ravaged England, and the U.S. was devastated by nuclear war. At the start of the novel, a quarantine placed on England due to the soldier's sickness prevents The Lieutenant from returning to England from his encampment in France. The Lieutenant commands the Fourth Brigade, which is composed of one hundred and sixty-eight soldiers from multiple nations, leading them throughout France in search of food, supplies, arms and ammunition. Soon, Captain Malcolm informs The Lieutenant that all field officers are being recalled to General Headquarters (GHQ) with their brigades to report to General Victor, the commanding officer at GHQ.

Upon the brigade's arrival at GHQ, The Lieutenant is informed by General Victor and his adjutant Colonel Smythe that he is to be reassigned and will be stripped of his command. He is confined to his quarters and is told his entire brigade will be broken apart and assimilated into another brigade. Meanwhile, in the barracks at G.H.Q., the Fourth Brigade learns of crucial news through back channels: the existence of a vaccine for the soldier's sickness, and General Victor's plans for their brigade. The men decide to rebel, and break through the defenses of the barracks, free The Lieutenant and kill Captain Malcolm. The Fourth Brigade successfully escapes G.H.Q. in France and begins to make their way to London, along with other soldiers who are dissatisfied with General Victor's command. A battle ensues between General Victor's men and The Lieutenant's troops. The Lieutenant and his expanded Fourth Brigade eventually successfully take control of London and subsequently all of England and Wales.

The Lieutenant's government runs smoothly for years, until the battleship USS New York arrives from the U.S. carrying two United States Senators and Captain Johnson, captain of the New York and commander of the U.S. fleet. Under threat from the U.S. battleship, The Lieutenant negotiates terms to transfer power to the Senators' associates – General Victor and Colonel Smythe. If anything happens to General Victor and Colonel Smythe, the country would be controlled by its officer corps, chaired by the Lieutenant's confidant, Swinburne. In addition, The Lieutenant requests that immigration of Americans to England be kept to no more than 100,000 per month, and demands that a favorable price be set for the purchase of land from their English owners. After these terms are established, The Lieutenant opens fire on General Victor and his men and a battle ensues. General Victor, Colonel Smythe, The Lieutenant, and several of The Lieutenant's men are killed. Years later The Lieutenant's men still control England, and a flag flies honoring his memory. A memorial plaque at Byward Gate on Tower Hill reads: "When that command remains, no matter what happens to its officer, he has not failed."

== Reception ==
Final Blackout is seen as an early classic of the Golden Age of Science Fiction. In his book The Encyclopedia of Science Fiction and Fantasy, Donald H. Tuck described the book as "Hubbard's masterpiece". Thomas D. Clareson writes in Understanding Contemporary American Science Fiction that prior to formalizing Dianetics and Scientology, Hubbard was "perhaps best known for Final Blackout". In his book Scientology: The Now Religion, George Malko writes that Hubbard's works including Slaves of Sleep, Kingslayer, Typewriter in the Sky, Fear, Death's Deputy, and Final Blackout "were eagerly welcomed by devoted fans". In his 1967 book Seekers of Tomorrow: Masters of Modern Science Fiction, Sam Moskowitz writes that the book "... was a stunning achievement, certainly the most powerful and readable 'warning' story that had appeared in science fiction to that date." Moskowitz comments: "The progress of today's events has made much of Final Blackout prophetic". Astounding reviewer P. Schuyler Miller described the book as one of the most "memorable" serials the magazine had published, saying it would be a "lasting volume."

Roland J. Green of the Chicago Sun-Times called the book "One of the highwater marks of his [Hubbard's] literary career", and "perhaps the best single novel yet of what the Pentagon once so charmingly christened 'the broken-backed war' after a nuclear exchange". Jon Stone of NewsNet5.com described Final Blackout and Fear as "pulp in composition and not great in length, they are straight stories with few or no elements of Hubbard's other career", and compared the "pages of battles and tactics" in Final Blackout to Hubbard's later work Battlefield Earth.

Final Blackout and Fear are often cited by critics as the best examples of Hubbard's pulp fiction works. Chuck Moss of Daily News of Los Angeles called the book "extremely good science fiction". The book has been included in the curriculum of a science-fiction writing class at California State Polytechnic University, Pomona. Cal Poly Pomona professor Steve Whaley told The Press-Enterprise that he thinks Hubbard was a "damn good storyteller". Karl Edward Wagner cited Final Blackout as one of the thirteen best science-fiction horror novels.
