= Death's Deputy =

1948 fantasy novel by L. Ron Hubbard

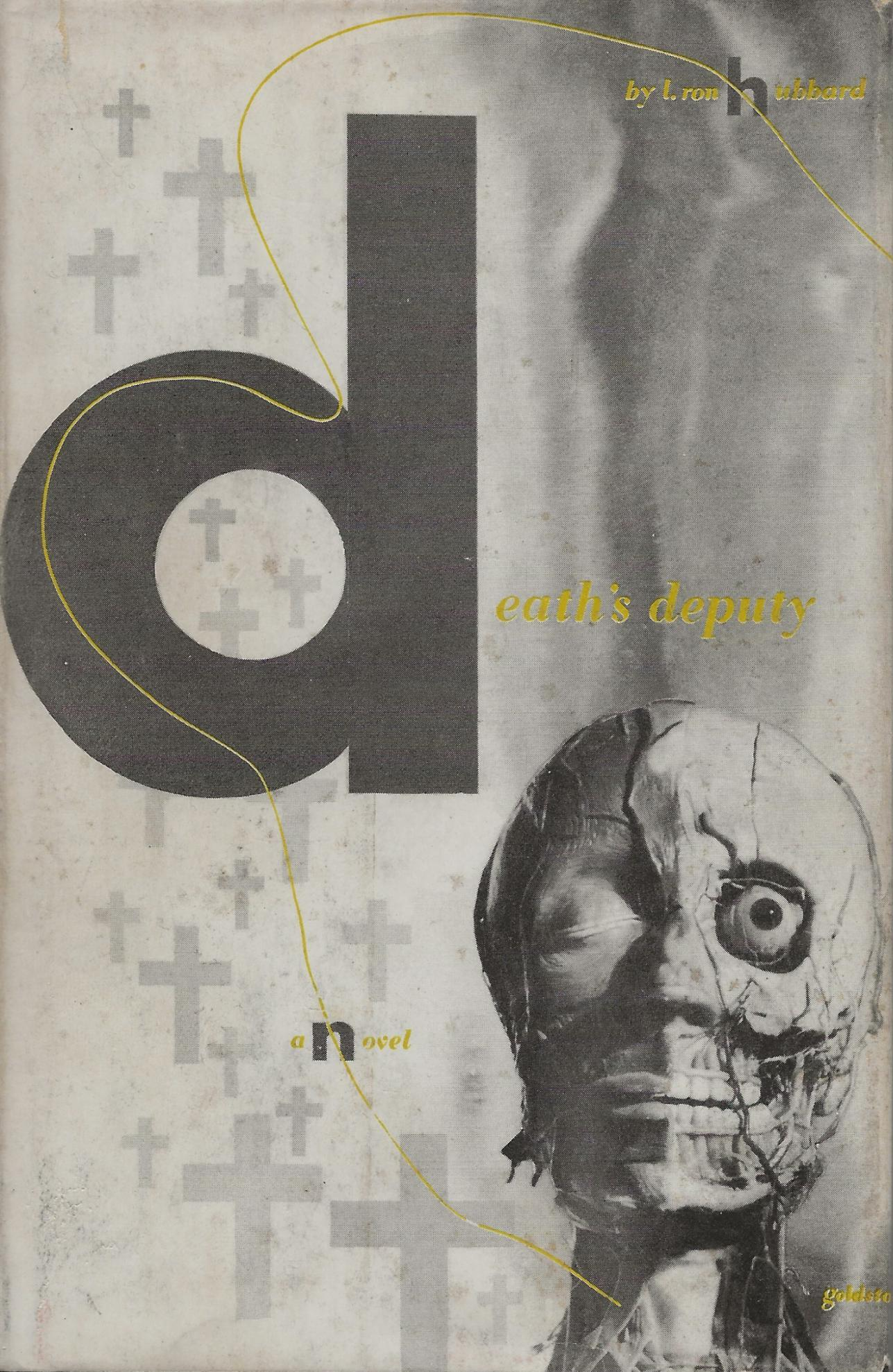
- Dust-jacket from the first edition
- Author: L. Ron Hubbard
- Cover artist: Lou Goldstone
- Language: English
- Genre: Fantasy novel
- Publisher: Fantasy Publishing Company, Inc.
- Publication date: 1948
- Publication place: United States
- Media type: Print (Hardcover, paperback)
- Pages: 167
- OCLC: 1132496

Death's Deputy is a fantasy novel by author L. Ron Hubbard.

Death's Deputy was first published in book form in 1948 by Fantasy Publishing Company, Inc. in an edition of 700 copies. The novel originally appeared in the February 1940 issue of the magazine Unknown.

== Plot introduction ==
An air force pilot is unnaturally accident-prone and seemingly cannot be killed.

== Publication history ==
- 1940, US, Unknown
- 1948, US, Fantasy Publishing Company, Inc. OCLC 1132496, hardcover, first book publication
- 1951, France, Hachette Livre, hardcover, as Le Bras de la mort
- 1954, Italy, Urania 37, hardcover, as L'uomo che no poteva morire
- 1971, US, Leisure Books OCLC 2907011, paperback
