= Ole Doc Methuselah =

1970 SF story collection by L. Ron Hubbard

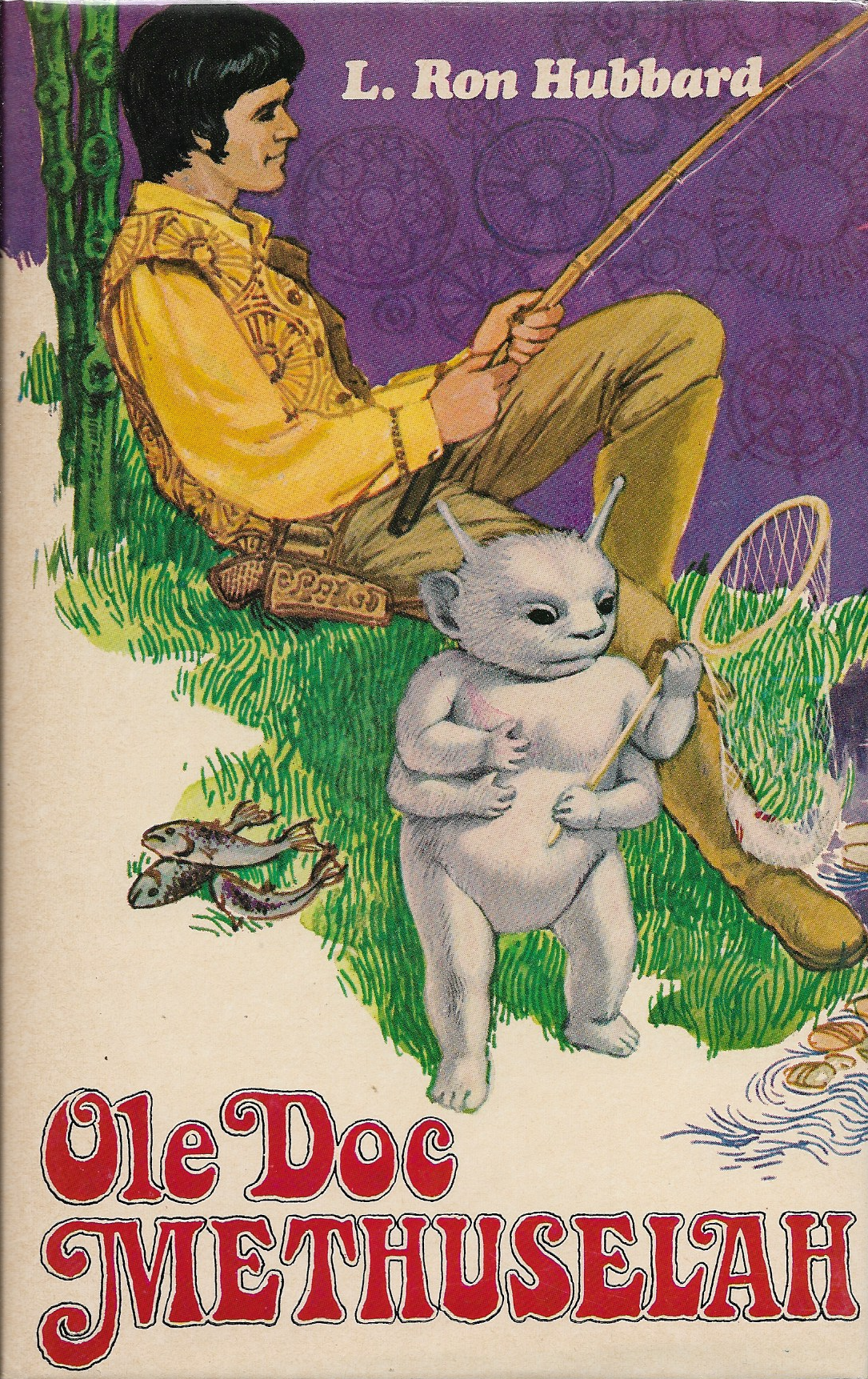
- First edition cover
- Author: L. Ron Hubbard
- Language: English
- Genre: Science fiction
- Publisher: Theta
- Publication date: July 1970
- Publication place: United States

Ole Doc Methuselah is a collection of science fiction short stories by American writer L. Ron Hubbard, published in 1970.

== Contents ==
The stories follow the adventures of "Old Doc Methuselah" in a future where interstellar travel is completely routine; humanity has spread through several galaxies, and has met many alien races.

Old Doc Methuselah is a "Soldier of Light". The Soldiers of Light are an organization of supremely skilled, extremely long-lived physicians whose prestige and authority are so great that they can go where they please and do very much as they please. At one point, a low-ranking character mentions that in his instructions for welcoming visiting dignitaries, Soldiers of Light are not mentioned. "Neither is God" is the answer he receives.

The stories usually deal with some situation that has become very bad, until Old Doc Methuselah arrives, figures out what has gone wrong, and puts things to rights, using his great authority to bend lesser folk to his will.

His only companion for most of the series is an alien he bought on a whim. The alien prefers serving Old Doc Methuselah over freedom, and mopes when the Doc frees him in one story. His servant is quite useful because of his photographic memory and great resilience and strength.
