= Buckskin Brigades =

1937 Western novel by L. Ron Hubbard

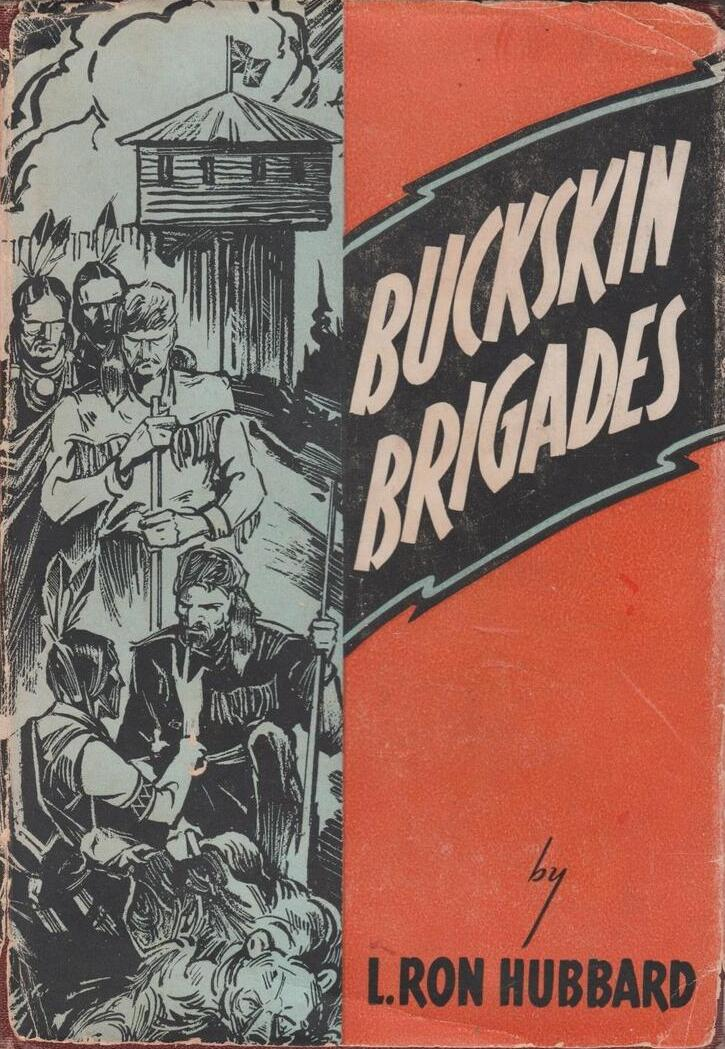
- First book edition
- Author: L. Ron Hubbard
- Language: English
- Subject: Piegan Blackfeet
- Genre: Western novel
- Publisher: Macaulay
- Publication date: July 30, 1937
- Publication place: United States
- Media type: Print (Hardback)
- Pages: 312 pp
- ISBN: 0-88404-280-4
- OCLC: 18163497

Buckskin Brigades is a Western novel written by L. Ron Hubbard, first published July 30, 1937. The work was Hubbard's first hard-covered book, and his first published novel. The next year he became a contributor to Astounding Science Fiction. Winfred Blevins wrote the introduction to the book. Some sources state that as a young man, Hubbard became a blood brother to the Piegan Blackfeet Native American tribe while living in Montana, though this claim is disputed. Hubbard incorporates historical background from the Blackfeet tribe into the book.

The book was re-released by Bridge Publications, Inc. in a 1987 edition. The book was published in an audiobook format by Bridge Publications and read by actor Bruce Boxleitner, who was hired by Church of Spiritual Technology subsidiary Author Services Inc. to read Hubbard's books on tape.

== Plot introduction ==
The book references a journal entry from Meriwether Lewis during the Lewis and Clark Expedition. In a July 27, 1806 entry, Lewis describes how he had killed a Blackfeet Native American chief during the expedition, and in another entry in the journal he mentions a white man living with the Blackfeet tribe. Part of Hubbard's story is based on this white man, referred to in the book by his Native American name, "Yellow Hair".

After the death of the Native American chief, Yellow Hair attempts to protect his adopted people from fur traders. Yellow Hair is sent to join the fur traders and learn how their future operations will affect his people. The white fur traders are portrayed as evil savages.

== Sales controversy ==
The book was discussed along with other works by Hubbard in an investigation into "skewed sales", in a 1990 article in the Los Angeles Times. Bookstore managers told reporters that after the 1987 re-release of Buckskin Brigades by Bridge Publications, the book "just sat there". Sheldon McArthur, former manager of B. Dalton Booksellers on Hollywood Boulevard in Los Angeles, told the Los Angeles Times: "Then, in one week, it was gone... We started getting calls asking, 'You got Buckskin Brigades?' I said, 'Sure, we got them.' You got a hundred of them?'".

McArthur stated "Whenever the sales seem to slacken and a (Hubbard) book goes off the bestsellers list, give it a week and we'll get these people coming in buying 50 to 100 to 200 copies at a crack - cash only." Gary Hamel, a former manager of B. Dalton Booksellers at Santa Monica Place, said "Ten people would come in at a time and buy quantities of them, and they would pay cash." Company officials from Bridge Publications, Inc. "refused to be interviewed about any facet of the firm's operations" for the Los Angeles Times article.

== Reception ==
In a 1987 review of a biography of Hubbard, L. Ron Hubbard: Messiah or Madman?, Francis Hamit of the Daily News of Los Angeles wrote: "Currently a recently discovered first novel, Buckskin Brigades, an account of the settlement of the Northwest Territories where the Indians are the good guys, is selling well and is further evidence of his considerable gift for writing compelling narrative." Cecil D. Roy, Jr. reviewed the book for The Advocate (Baton Rouge), and wrote that "Hubbard's style at times approaches the stilted, artificial style of some novelists of the late 19th and early 20th century," and that Hubbard "never achieves the easy flow of descriptive prose" of writers Zane Grey and Stewart Edward White. Roy Jr. characterized the book as "a good adventure novel of the West", but concluded with: "..don't look for the true Mountain Man in Buckskin Brigades."

In a 1992 review of the audio book, Dick Richmond of the St. Louis Post-Dispatch wrote: "Hubbard has created a memorable figure in Yellow Hair. Even though the story is not quite in the same class as Kenneth Roberts' Northwest Passage, it does contain strong characterizations, especially those involving the leaders of the fur traders." In a 2003 interview with Publishers Weekly, William J. Widder – author of Master Storyteller: An Illustrated Tour of the Fiction of L. Ron Hubbard – called the book "One of the first novels to present a sympathetic and accurate view of Indians."

In the book Bare Faced Messiah, author Russell Miller recounts that the Hudson's Bay Company sent Hubbard an honorary case of whiskey after publication and Macaulay had offered an advance of $2,500. Rather than pay off his considerable personal debts, Hubbard splurged on a brand new boat called the Magician.
