= Fear (Hubbard novella) =

1940 horror novella by L. Ron Hubbard

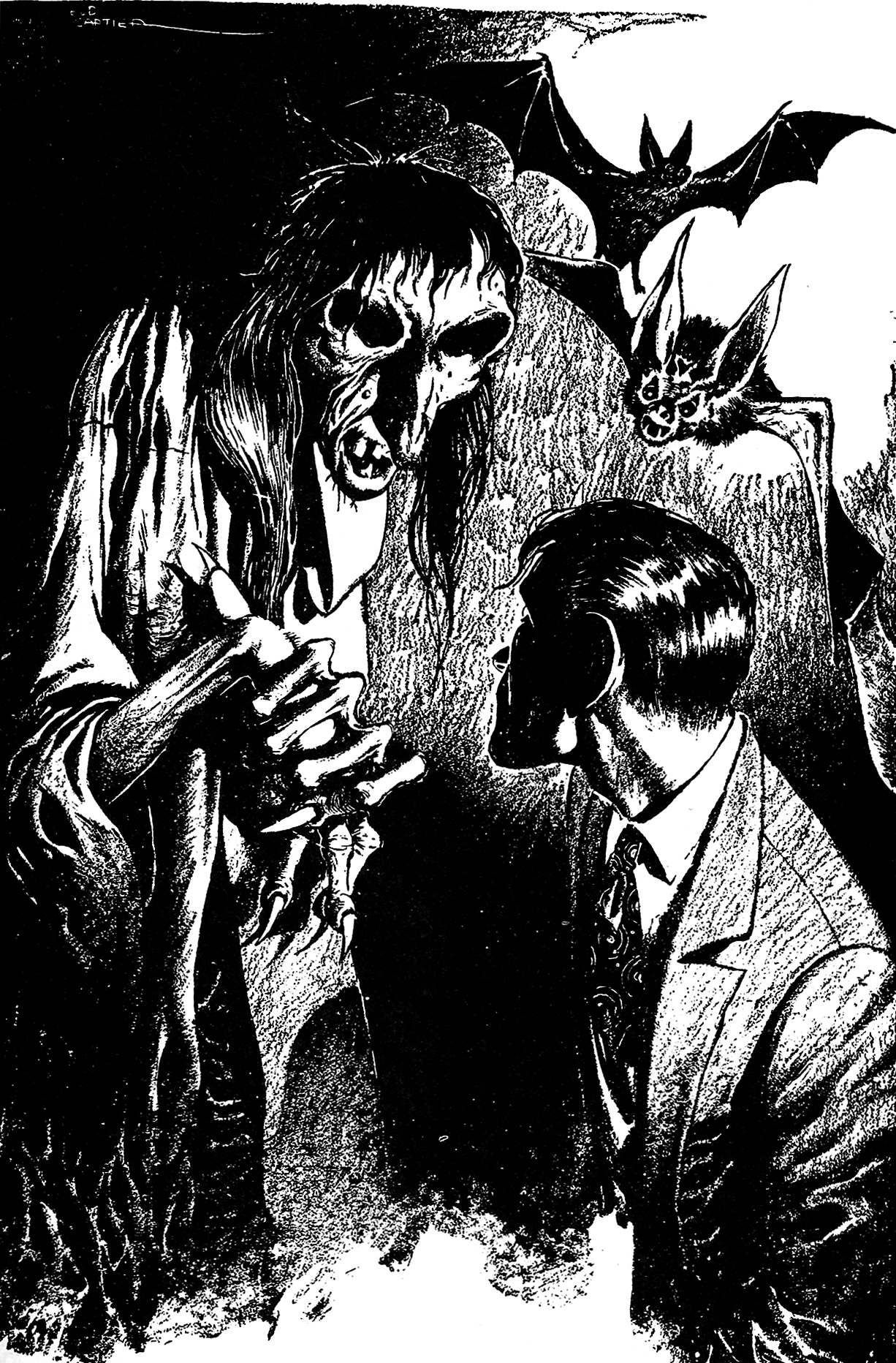
- Illustration for Fear by Edd Cartier in Unknown magazine
- Author: L. Ron Hubbard
- Language: English
- Genre: Horror, mystery
- Publisher: Unknown Fantasy Fiction (in magazine form)
- Publication date: July 1940
- Publication place: United States
- Media type: Serial

Fear is a psychological thriller-horror novella by American writer L. Ron Hubbard, which first appeared in the magazine Unknown Fantasy Fiction in July 1940.

== Summary ==
Having just returned from an expedition to the Yucatán, Professor of ethnology James Lowry is a disbeliever in spirits, demons or the supernatural. He writes an article in the town newspaper denouncing such beliefs as tricks played in primitive civilizations. The dean of the university, Jebsen, accuses Lowry of using his article to attack Christianity and fires Lowry from teaching. Lowry visits his longtime friend and fellow professor Tommy Williams where the two share a drink to discuss Lowry's termination. Tommy semi-jokingly warns Lowry that his article may have antagonized the very demons Lowry denounced, and now they are out to ruin Lowry's life.

Abruptly, Lowry awakes to find himself on the sidewalk outside Tommy's house, with no memory of how he got there. His hat is missing and four hours have inexplicably passed. Lowry is pursued by an omnipotent evil force that is turning his whole world against him while it whispers a warning from the shadows: "...if you find your hat you'll find your four hours. If you find your four hours then you will die..." Lowry is suspicious that Tommy may be having an affair with his wife, Mary, even in his dreams of demons.

Lowry goes about his day-to-day life, but increasingly begins seeing demons, ghouls and odd things around him. He wakes up in the middle of the night to shadows that are leading him out of his bedroom and out into his garden which has transformed into a vast slope. At this point, he is led down a long winding staircase in the middle of his lawn that seems to disappear. He goes out looking for the four hours of his life that he has lost and his hat.

He both finds the hat and realizes what he has done in the four hours in a final twist of the book, where the reader comes to realize that he had a psychotic break early on (the missing 4 hours). The truth is, Lowry has murdered his wife and friend Tommy.

== Publication ==
The story first appeared in the magazine Unknown Fantasy Fiction in July 1940. While previous editions followed the magazine text, the 1991 Bridge edition reportedly restores the author's original manuscript text.

== Reception ==
Groff Conklin, reviewing the novella's first book publication, praised it as "a totally unexpected masterpiece of horror". Anthony Boucher and J. Francis McComas described it as a "nearly perfect psychological terror novel, and by far the best writing we've ever seen from Hubbard". The New York Times reviewer Villiers Gerson cited the novella's "horrible and eerie denouement". Algis Budrys wrote that the novella "exercised an uncommon power over the minds of its readers." Stephen King described Fear as "a classic tale of creeping, surreal menace and horror". E. F. Bleiler found Fear to be "a superior psychological mystery in sensational terms."
