= Sara Northrup Hollister =

American occultist (1924–1997)

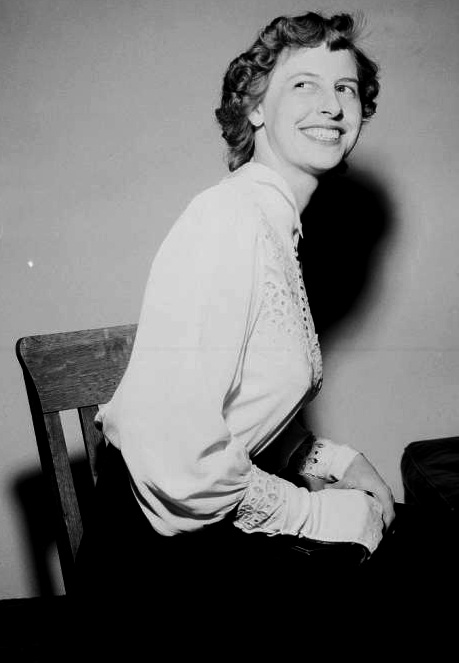
- Sara Northrup Hollister in April 1951
- Born: April 8, 1924; Pasadena, California, United States
- Died: December 19, 1997 (aged 73); Hadley, Massachusetts, United States
- Spouse(s): L. Ron Hubbard (1946–1951); Miles Hollister (1951–1997)
- Children: 1

Sara Elizabeth Bruce Northrup Hollister (April 8, 1924 – December 19, 1997) was an American occultist and second wife of Scientology founder L. Ron Hubbard. She played a major role in the creation of Dianetics, which evolved into the religious movement Scientology. Hubbard would evolve into the leader of the Church of Scientology.

Northrup was a figure in the Pasadena branch of Ordo Templi Orientis (O.T.O.), a secret society led by the English occultist Aleister Crowley, where she was known as "Soror [Sister] Cassap". She joined as a teenager along with her older sister Helen. From 1941 to 1945 she had a turbulent relationship with her sister's husband John Whiteside Parsons, a pioneer in solid-fuel rocketry and head of the Pasadena O.T.O. Although she was a committed and popular member, she acquired a reputation for disruptiveness that prompted Crowley to denounce her as a "vampire." She began a relationship with L. Ron Hubbard, whom she met through O.T.O., in 1945. She and Hubbard eloped, taking with them a substantial amount of Parsons' life savings and marrying bigamously a year later while Hubbard was still married to his first wife, Margaret Grubb.

Northrup played a significant role in the development of Dianetics, Hubbard's "modern science of mental health", between 1948 and 1951. She was Hubbard's personal auditor and along with Hubbard, one of the seven members of the Dianetics Foundation's Board of Directors. However, their marriage was deeply troubled; Hubbard was responsible for a prolonged campaign of domestic violence against her and kidnapped both her and her infant daughter. Hubbard spread allegations that she was a Communist secret agent and repeatedly denounced her to the FBI. The FBI declined to take any action, characterizing Hubbard as a "mental case". The marriage ended in 1951 and prompted lurid headlines in the Los Angeles newspapers. She subsequently married one of Hubbard's former employees, Miles Hollister, and moved to Hawaii and later Massachusetts, where she died in 1997.

== Early life ==
Northrup was born in 1924 to Burton Ashley Northrup and Olga Nelson, the daughter of a Swedish immigrant to the United States. She was the granddaughter of Russian emigrant Malacon Kosadamanov (later Nelson) who emigrated to Sweden. The couple had three daughters. In 1923 the family moved to Pasadena, a destination said to have been chosen by Olga using a Ouija board.

Although she later remembered her childhood with warmth, Northrup's upbringing was marred by her sexually abusive father, who was imprisoned in 1928 for financial fraud. She was sexually active from an unusually young age and often said she lost her virginity at the age of ten.

== Relationship with Jack Parsons ==
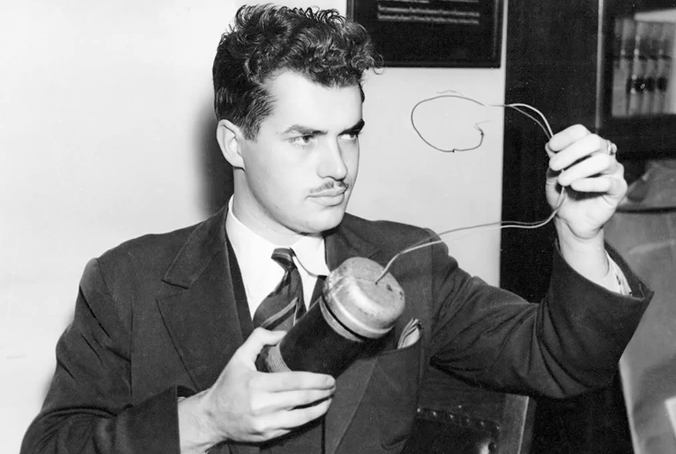
Jack Parsons in 1938

In 1933, Northrup's 22-year-old sister Helen met the 18-year-old Jack Parsons, a chemist who went on to be a noted expert in rocket propulsion. Jack Parsons was also an avid student and practitioner of the occult. Helen and Jack were engaged in July 1934 and married in April 1935. Parsons' interest in the occult led in 1939 to him and Helen joining the Pasadena branch of Ordo Templi Orientis (O.T.O.). At age 15, Northrup moved in with sister Helen and her husband Jack, while she finished high school.

Sara Northrup joined O.T.O. in 1941, at Parsons' urging, and was given the title of Soror [Sister] Cassap. She soon rose to the rank of a second degree member, or "Magician", of O.T.O. In June 1941, at the age of seventeen, she began a passionate affair with Parsons while her sister Helen was away on vacation. When Helen returned, she found Northrup wearing Helen's own clothes and calling herself Parsons' "new wife". Such conduct was expressly permitted by O.T.O., which followed Crowley's disdain of marriage as a "detestable institution" and accepted as commonplace the swapping of wives and partners between O.T.O. members.

Although both were committed O.T.O. members, Northrup's usurpation of Helen's role led to conflict between the two sisters. The reactions of Parsons and Helen towards Northrup were markedly different. Parsons told Helen to her face that he preferred Northrup sexually: "This is a fact that I can do nothing about. I am better suited to her temperamentally – we get on well. Your character is superior. You are a greater person. I doubt that she would face what you have with me – or support me as well." Some years later, addressing himself as "You", Parsons told himself that his affair with Northrup (whom he called Betty) marked a key step in his growth as a practitioner of magick: "Betty served to affect a transference from Helen at a critical period ... Your passion for Betty also gave you the magical force needed at the time, and the act of adultery tinged with incest, served as your magical confirmation in the law of Thelema."

In 1942 Agape Lodge moved into the house at 1003 South Orange Grove Avenue, a rambling mansion next door to the estate of Adolphus Busch. Parsons subdivided the house into 19 apartments which he populated with a mixture of artists, writers, scientists and occultists. She made a striking impression on the other lodgers; George Pendle describes her as "feisty and untamed, proud and self-willed, she stood five foot nine, had a lithe body and blond hair, and was extremely candid."

Helen was far less sanguine, writing in her diary of "the sore spot I carried where my heart should be", and had furious – sometimes violent – rows with both Parsons and Northrup. She began an affair with Wilfred Smith, Parsons' mentor in O.T.O. and had a son in 1943 who bore Parsons' surname but who was almost certainly fathered by Smith. Northrup also became pregnant but had an abortion on April 1, 1943, arranged by Parsons and carried out by Dr. Zachary Taylor Malaby, a prominent Pasadena doctor and Democratic politician.

Northrup's hostility towards other members of O.T.O. caused further tensions in the house, which Aleister Crowley heard about from communications from her housemates. He dubbed her "the alley-cat" after an unnamed mutual acquaintance told him that Parsons's attraction to her was like "a yellow pup bumming around with his snout glued to the rump of an alley-cat." Concluding that she was a vampire, which he defined as "an elemental or demon in the form of a woman" who sought to "lure the Candidate to his destruction," he warned that Northrup was a grave danger to Parsons and to the "Great Work" which O.T.O. was carrying out in California.

Similar concerns were expressed by other O.T.O. members. O.T.O.'s US head, Karl Germer, labeled her "an ordeal sent by the gods". Her disruptive behavior appalled Fred Gwynn, a new O.T.O. member living in the commune at 1003 South Orange Grove Avenue: "Betty went to almost fantastical lengths to disrupt the meetings [of O.T.O.] that Jack did get together. If she could not break it up by making social engagements with key personnel she, and her gang, would go out to a bar and keep calling in asking for certain people to come to the telephone."

== Relationship with L. Ron Hubbard ==
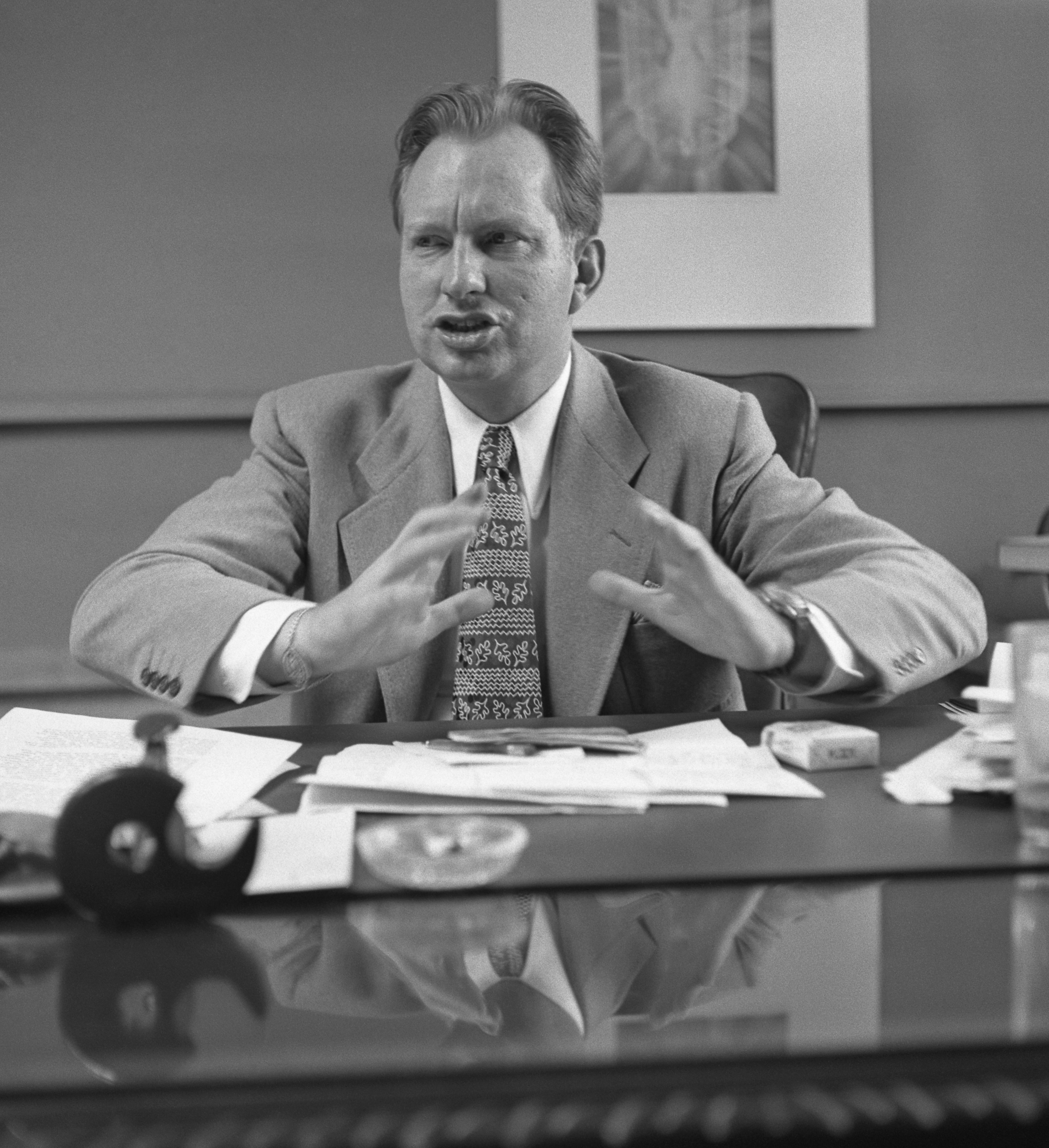
L. Ron Hubbard in 1950

In August 1945, Northrup met L. Ron Hubbard for the first time. He had visited 1003 South Orange Grove Avenue at the behest of Lou Goldstone, a well-known science fiction illustrator, while on leave from his service in the US Navy. Parsons took an immediate liking to Hubbard and invited him to stay in the house for the duration of his leave. Hubbard soon began an affair with Northrup after beginning "affairs with one girl after another in the house." He was a striking figure who habitually wore dark glasses and carried a cane with a silver handle, the need for which he attributed to his wartime service: as Northrup later put it, "He was not only a writer but he was the captain of a ship that had been downed in the Pacific and he was weeks on a raft and had been blinded by the sun and his back had been broken." She believed all of it, though none of his claims of wartime action or injuries were true.

Parsons was deeply dismayed but tried to put a brave face on the situation, informing Aleister Crowley:

About three months ago I met Captain [sic] L. Ron Hubbard, a writer and explorer of whom I had known for some time … He is a gentleman; he has red hair, green eyes, is honest and intelligent, and we have become great friends. He moved in with me about two months ago, and although Betty and I are still friendly, she has transferred her sexual affection to Ron.

I think I have made a great gain and as Betty and I are the best of friends, there is little loss. I cared for her rather deeply but I have no desire to control her emotions, and I can, I hope, control my own. I need a magical partner. I have many experiments in mind.

Hubbard became Parsons' "magical partner" for a sex magic ritual that was intended to summon an incarnation of a goddess. Although they got on well as fellow occultists, tensions between the two men were apparent in more domestic settings. Hubbard and Northrup made no secret of their relationship; another lodger at Parsons' house described how he saw Hubbard "living off Parsons' largesse and making out with his girlfriend right in front of him. Sometimes when the two of them were sitting at the table together, the hostility was almost tangible." Despite the tensions between them, Hubbard, Northrup and Parsons agreed at the start of 1946 that they would go into business together, buying yachts on the East Coast and sailing them to California to sell at a profit. They set up a business partnership on January 15, 1946 under the name of "Allied Enterprises", with Parsons putting up $20,000 of capital, Hubbard adding $1,200 and Northrup contributing nothing. Hubbard and Northrup left for Florida towards the end of April, Hubbard taking with him $10,000 drawn from the Allied Enterprises account to fund the purchase of the partnership's first yacht. Weeks passed without word from Hubbard. Louis Culling, another O.T.O. member, wrote to Karl Germer to explain the situation:

As you may know by this time, Brother John signed a partnership agreement with this Ron and Betty whereby all money earned by the three for life is equally divided between the three. As far as I can ascertain, Brother John has put in all of his money ... Meanwhile, Ron and Betty have bought a boat for themselves in Miami for about $10,000 and are living the life of Riley, while Brother John is living at Rock Bottom, and I mean Rock Bottom. It appears that originally they never secretly intended to bring this boat around to the California coast to sell at a profit, as they told Jack, but rather to have a good time on it on the east coast.

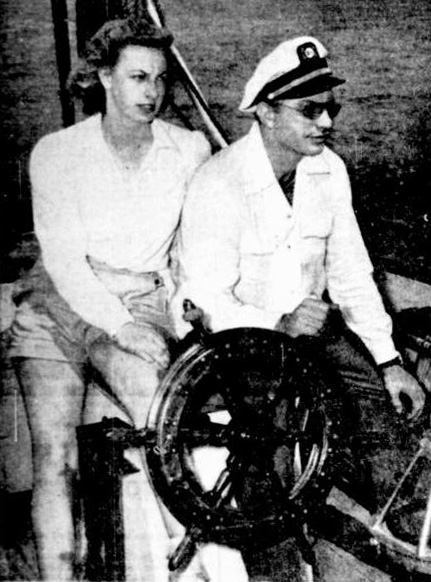
Hubbard and Northrup aboard the schooner Blue Water II in Miami, Florida, June 1946. The Church of Scientology has republished this photograph with Northrup airbrushed out.

Germer informed Crowley, who wrote back to opine: "It seems to me on the information of our brethren in California that Parsons has got an illumination in which he has lost all his personal independence. From our brother's account he has given away both his girl and his money. Apparently it is the ordinary confidence trick."

Parsons initially attempted to obtain redress through magical means, carrying out a "Banishing Ritual of the Pentagram" to curse Hubbard and Northrup. He credited it with causing the couple to abort an attempt to evade him:

Hubbard attempted to escape me by sailing at 5 P.M., and I performed a full evocation to Bartzabel [the spirit of Mars or War] within the circle at 8 P.M. At the same time, so far as I can check, his ship was struck by a sudden squall off the coast, which ripped off his sails and forced him back to port, where I took the boat in custody... Here I am in Miami pursuing the children of my folly; they cannot move without going to jail. However I am afraid that most of the money has already been dissipated.

Northrup later recalled that the boat had been caught in a hurricane in the Panama Canal, damaging it too badly to be able to continue the voyage to California. Parsons subsequently resorted to more conventional means of obtaining redress and sued the couple on July 1 in the Circuit Court for Dade County. His lawsuit accused Hubbard and Northrup of breaking the terms of their partnership, dissipating the assets and attempting to abscond. The case was settled out of court eleven days later, with Hubbard and Northrup agreeing to refund some of Parsons' money while keeping a yacht, the Harpoon, for themselves. The boat was soon sold to ease the couple's shortage of cash. Northrup was able to dissuade Parsons from pressing his case by threatening to expose their past relationship, which had begun when she was under the legal age of consent. Hubbard's relationship with Northrup, while legal, had already caused alarm among those who knew him; Virginia Heinlein, the wife of the science fiction writer Robert Heinlein, regarded Hubbard as "a very sad case of post-war breakdown" and Northrup as his "latest Man-Eating Tigress".

Hubbard's financial troubles were reflected in his attempts to persuade the Veterans Administration to increase his pension award on the grounds of a variety of ailments which he said were preventing him finding a job. He persuaded Northrup to pose as an old friend writing in support of his appeals; in one letter, she claimed untruthfully to have "known Lafayette Ronald Hubbard for many years" and described his supposed pre-war state of health. His health and emotional difficulties were reflected in another, much more private, document which has been dubbed "The Affirmations". It is thought to have been written around 1946–7 as part of an attempted program of self-hypnotism. His sexual difficulties with Northrup, for which he was taking testosterone supplements, are a significant feature of the document. He wrote:

Sara, my sweetheart, is young, beautiful, desirable. We are very gay companions. I please her physically until she weeps about any separation. I want her always. But I am 13 years older than she. She is heavily sexed. My libido is so low I hardly admire her naked.

Around the same time, Hubbard proposed marriage to Northrup. According to Northrup's later recollections she repeatedly refused him but relented after he threatened to kill himself. She told him: "All right, I'll marry you, if that's going to save you." They were married in the middle of the night of August 10, 1946 at Chestertown, Maryland after awakening a minister and roping in his wife and housekeeper to serve as witnesses. It was not until much later that Northrup discovered that Hubbard had never been divorced from his first wife, Margaret "Polly" Grubb; the marriage was bigamous. Ironically, the wedding took place only 30 miles from the town where Hubbard had married his first wife thirteen years previously. The wedding attracted criticism from L. Sprague de Camp, another science fiction colleague of Hubbard's, who suggested to the Heinleins that he supposed "Polly was tiresome about not giving him his divorce so he could marry six other gals who were all hot & moist over him. How many girls is a man entitled to in one lifetime, anyway? Maybe he should be reincarnated as a rabbit."

The couple moved repeatedly over the following year – first to Laguna Beach, California, then to Santa Catalina Island, California, New York City, Stroudsburg, Pennsylvania and ultimately to Hubbard's first wife's home at South Colby, Washington. Polly Hubbard had filed for divorce on the grounds of desertion and non-support, and was not even aware that Hubbard was living with Northrup, let alone that he had married her. The arrival of Hubbard and Northrup three weeks after the divorce was filed scandalized Hubbard's family, who deeply disapproved of his treatment of Polly. Northrup had no idea of Hubbard's first marriage or why people were treating her so strangely until his son L. Ron Hubbard Jr. told her that his parents were still married. She attempted to flee on a ferry but Hubbard caught up with her and convinced her to stay, saying that he was in the process of getting a divorce and that an attorney had told him that the marriage with Northrup was legal. The couple moved to a rented trailer in North Hollywood in July 1947, where Hubbard spent much of his time writing stories for pulp magazines.

The relationship was not an easy one. According to Northrup, Hubbard began beating her when they were in Florida in the summer of 1946. Her father had just died and her grief appeared to aggravate Hubbard, who was attempting to restart his pre-war career of writing pulp fiction. He was struggling with constant writer's block and leaned heavily on Northrup to provide plot ideas and even to help write some of his stories. She later recalled: "I would often entertain him with plots so he could write. I loved to make plots. The Ole Doc Methuselah series was done that way." One night while they were living beside a frozen lake in Stroudsburg, Hubbard hit her across the face with his .45 pistol. She recalled that "I got up and left the house in the night and walked on the ice of the lake because I was terrified." Despite her shock and humiliation, she felt compelled to return to Hubbard. He was severely depressed and repeatedly threatened suicide, and Northrup believed "he must be suffering or he wouldn't act that way".

After Hubbard was convicted of petty theft in San Luis Obispo in August 1948, the couple moved again to Savannah, Georgia. Hubbard told his friend Forrest J. Ackerman that he had acquired a Dictaphone machine which Northrup was "beating out her wits on" transcribing not only fiction but his book on the "cause and cure of nervous tension". This eventually became the first draft of Hubbard's book Dianetics: The Modern Science of Mental Health, which marked the foundation of Dianetics and ultimately of Scientology.

== The Dianetics years ==
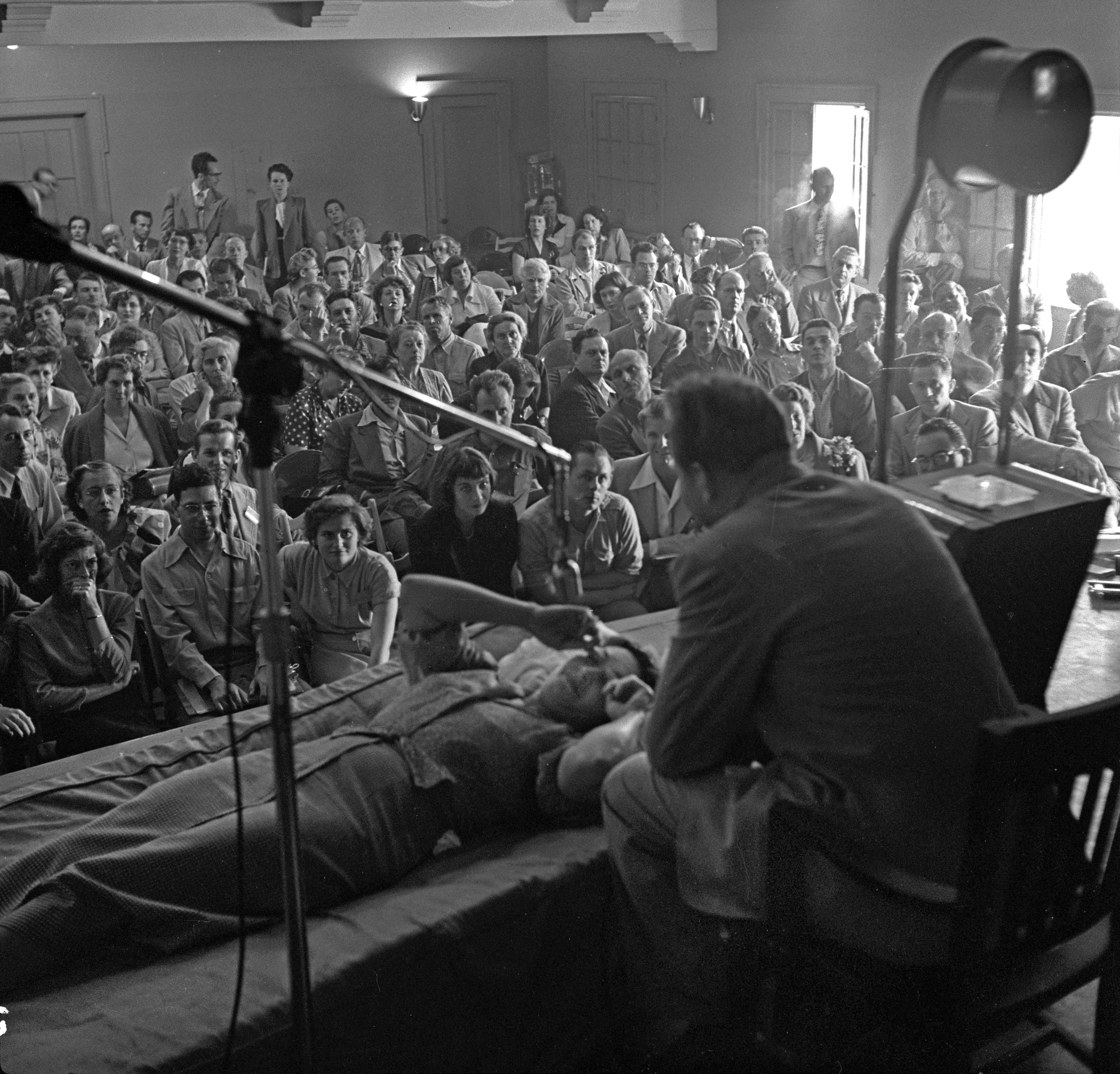
Hubbard conducting a Dianetics seminar in 1950

The final version of Dianetics was written at Bay Head, New Jersey in a cottage which the science fiction editor John W. Campbell had found for the Hubbards. Northrup, who was beginning a pregnancy, was said to have been delighted with the location. In three years of marriage to Hubbard, she had set up home in seven different states and had never stayed in one place for more than a few months. She gave birth on March 8, 1950 to a daughter, Alexis Valerie. A month later Northrup was made a director of the newly established Hubbard Dianetic Research Foundation in Elizabeth, New Jersey, an organization founded to disseminate knowledge of Dianetics. The Hubbards moved to a new house in Elizabeth to be near the Foundation. Northrup became Hubbard's personal auditor (Dianetic counselor) and was hailed by him as one of the first Dianetic "Clears".

Dianetics became an immediate bestseller when it was published in May 1950. Only two months later, over 55,000 copies had been sold and 500 Dianetics groups had been set up across the United States. The Dianetics Foundation was making a huge amount of money, but problems were already evident: money was pouring out as fast as it was coming in, due to lax financial management and Hubbard's own free spending. Northrup recalled that "he used to carry huge amounts of cash around in his pocket. I remember going past a Lincoln dealer and admiring one of those big Lincolns they had then. He walked right in there and bought it for me, cash!"

By October, the Foundation's financial affairs had reached a crisis point. According to his public relations assistant, Barbara Klowden, Hubbard became increasingly paranoid and authoritarian due to "political and organizational problems with people grabbing for power." He began an affair with the twenty-year-old Klowden, much to the annoyance of Northrup, who was clearly aware of the liaison. Klowden recalled that Northrup "was very hostile to me. We were talking about guns and she said to me that I was the type to use a Saturday night special" (a very cheap "junk gun"). One evening he arranged a double-date with his wife and Klowden, who was accompanied by Hollister, an instructor in the Los Angeles Dianetic Foundation. The dinner party backfired drastically; Northrup began an affair with Hollister, a handsome 22-year-old who was college-educated and a noted sportsman.

The marriage was in the process of breaking down rapidly. Northrup and Hubbard had frequent rows and his violent behaviour towards her continued unabated. On one occasion, while Northrup was pregnant, Hubbard kicked her several times in the stomach in an apparent – though unsuccessful – attempt to induce an abortion. She recalled that "with or without an argument, there'd be an upsurge of violence. The veins in his forehead would engorge" and he would hit her "out of the blue", breaking her eardrum in one attack. Despite this, she still "felt so guilty about the fact that he was so psychologically damaged. I felt as though he had given so much to our country and I couldn't even bring him peace of mind. I believed thoroughly that he was a man of great honor, had sacrificed his well being to the country ... It just never occurred to me he was a liar." He told her that he didn't want to be married "for I can buy my friends whenever I want them" but he could not divorce either, as the stigma would hurt his reputation. Instead, he said, if Northrup really loved him she should kill herself.

Klowden recalled later that "he was very down in the dumps about his wife. He told me how he had met Northrup. He said he went to a party and got drunk and when he woke up in the morning he found Northrup was in bed with him. He was having a lot of problems with her. I remember he said to me I was the only person he knew who would set up a white silk tent for him. I was rather surprised when we were driving back to LA on Sunday evening, he stopped at a florist to buy some flowers for his wife." In November 1950, Northrup attempted suicide by taking sleeping pills. Hubbard blamed Klowden for the suicide bid and told her to forget about him and the Foundation, but resumed the affair with her again within a month.

Hubbard attempted to patch up the marriage in January 1951 by inviting Northrup and baby Alexis to Palm Springs, California where he had rented a house. The situation soon became tense again; Richard de Mille, nephew of the famous director Cecil B. de Mille, recalled that "there was a lot of turmoil and dissension in the Foundation at the time; he kept accusing Communists of trying to take control and he was having difficulties with Northrup. It was clear their marriage was breaking up – she was very critical of him and he told me she was fooling around with Hollister and he didn't trust her." Hubbard enlisted de Mille and another Dianeticist, Dave Williams, in an attempt to convince her to stay with him. John Sanborne, who worked with Hubbard for many years, recalled:

Earlier on (before the divorce) he made this stupid attempt to get Northrup brainwashed so she'd do what he said. He kept her sitting up in a chair, denying her sleep, trying to use Black Dianetic principles on her, repeating over and over again whatever he wanted her to do. Things like, "Be his wife, have a family that looks good, not have a divorce." Or whatever. He had Dick de Mille reciting this sort of thing day and night to her.

Northrup went to a psychiatrist to obtain advice about Hubbard's increasingly violent and irrational behaviour, and was told that he probably needed to be institutionalized and that she was in serious danger. She gave Hubbard an ultimatum: get treatment or she would leave with the baby. He was furious and threatened to kill Alexis rather than let Northrup care for her: "He didn't want her to be brought up by me because I was in league with the doctors. He thought I had thrown in with the psychiatrists, with the devils." She left Palm Springs on February 3, leaving Hubbard to complain that Northrup "had hypnotized him in his sleep and commanded him not to write."

== Kidnapped by Hubbard ==
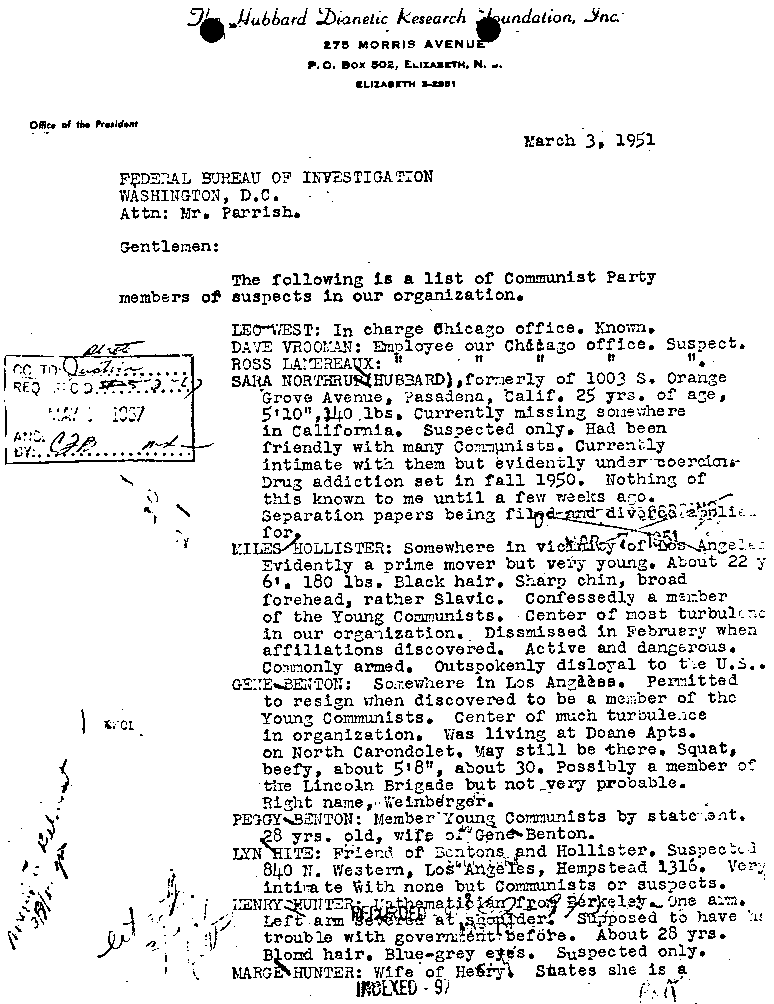
Letter sent by L. Ron Hubbard to the FBI on March 3, 1951, denouncing his wife and her lover as Communists

Three weeks later, Hubbard abducted both Northrup and Alexis. On the night of February 24, 1951, Alexis was being looked after by John Sanborne while Northrup had a night at the movies. Hubbard turned up and took the child. A few hours later, he returned with two of his Dianetics Foundation staff and told Northrup, who was now back at her apartment: "We have Alexis and you'll never see her alive unless you come with us." She was bundled into the back of a car and driven to San Bernardino, California, where Hubbard attempted to find a doctor to examine his wife and declare her insane. His search was unsuccessful and he released her at Yuma Airport across the state line in Arizona. He promised that he would tell her where Alexis was if she signed a piece of paper saying that she had gone with him voluntarily. Northrup agreed but Hubbard reneged on the deal and flew to Chicago, where he found a psychologist who wrote a favorable report about his mental condition to refute Northrup's accusations. Rather than telling Northrup where Alexis was, he called her and said that "he had cut [Alexis] into little pieces and dropped the pieces in a river and that he had seen little arms and legs floating down the river and it was my fault, I'd done it because I'd left him."

Hubbard subsequently returned to the Foundation in Elizabeth, New Jersey. There he wrote a letter informing the FBI that Northrup and her lover Miles Hollister – whom he had fired from the Foundation's staff and, according to Hollister, had also threatened to kill – were among fifteen "known or suspected Communists" in his organization. He listed them as:

SARA NORTHRUP (HUBBARD): formerly of 1003 S. Orange Grove Avenue, Pasadena, Calif. 25 yrs. of age, 5'10", 140 lbs. Currently missing somewhere in California. Suspected only. Had been friendly with many Communists. Currently intimate with them but evidently under coercion. Drug addiction set in fall 1950. Nothing of this known to me until a few weeks ago. Separation papers being filed and divorce applied for. MILES HOLLISTER: Somewhere in the vicinity of Los Angeles. Evidently a prime mover but very young. About 22 yrs, 6', 180 lbs. Black hair. Sharp chin, broad forehead, rather Slavic. Confessedly a member of the Young Communists. Center of most turbulence in our organization. Dissmissed [sic] in February when affiliations discovered. Active and dangerous. Commonly armed. Outspokenly disloyal to the U.S.

In another letter sent in March, Hubbard told the FBI that Northrup was a Communist and a drug addict, and offered a $10,000 reward to anyone who could resolve Northrup's problems through the application of Dianetics techniques.

Northrup filed a kidnapping complaint with the Los Angeles Police Department on her return home but was rebuffed by the police, who dismissed the affair as a mere domestic dispute. After a fruitless six-week search she finally filed a writ of habeas corpus at the Los Angeles Superior Court in April 1951, demanding the return of Alexis. The dispute immediately became front-page news: the newspapers ran headlines such as "Cult Founder Accused of Tot Kidnap", "'Dianetic' Hubbard Accused of Plot to Kidnap Wife", and "Hiding of Baby Charged to Dianetics Author". Hubbard fled to Havana, Cuba, where he wrote a letter to Northrup:

Dear Sara,

I have been in the Cuban military hospital and I am being transferred to the United States next week as a classified scientist immune from interference of all kinds.

Though I will be hospitalized probably a long time, Alexis is getting excellent care. I see her every day. She is all I have to live for.

My wits never gave way under all you did and let them do but my body didn't stand up. My right side is paralyzed and getting more so. I hope my heart lasts. I may live a long time and again I may not. But Dianetics will last 10,000 years – for the Army and Navy have it now.

My Will is all changed. Alexis will get a fortune unless she goes to you as she would then get nothing. Hope to see you once more. Goodbye – I love you.

Ron.

In reality, Hubbard had made an unsuccessful request for assistance from the US military attaché to Havana. The attaché did not act on the request; having asked the FBI for background information, he was told that Hubbard had been interviewed but the "agent conducting interview considered Hubbard to be [a] mental case." On April 19, as Barbara Klowden recorded in her journal, Hubbard telephoned her from Wichita and told her "he was not legally married. His first wife had not obtained divorce until '47 and he was married in '46. According to him, Sara had served a stretch at Tahatchapie [sic] (in a desert woman's prison) and was a dope addict." A few days later – while still married to Northrup – he proposed marriage to Klowden.

== Divorce from Hubbard ==
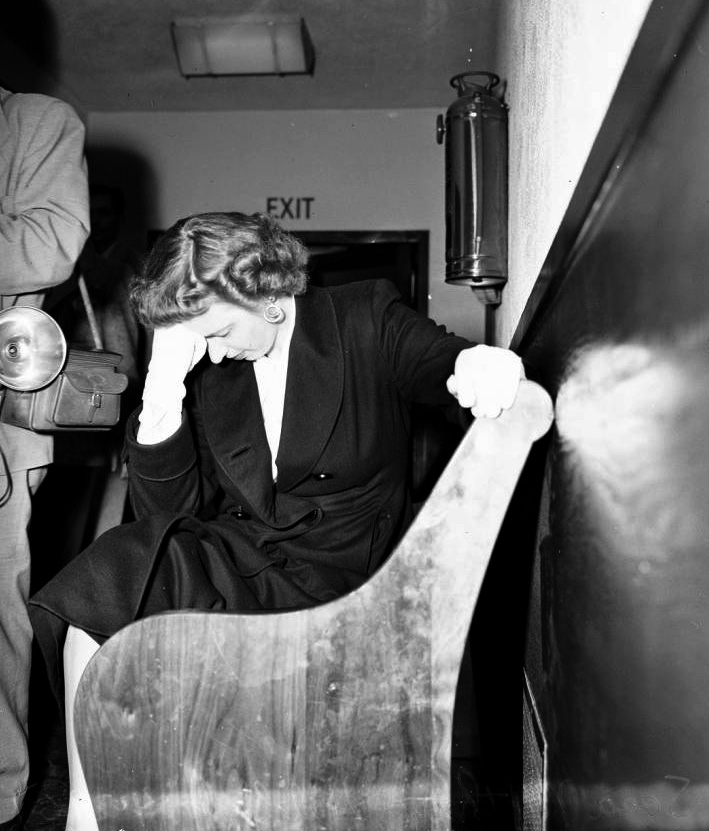
Northrup at a custody hearing, April 24, 1951

Northrup filed for divorce on April 23, 1951, charging Hubbard with "extreme cruelty" causing her "great mental anguish and physical suffering". Her allegations produced more lurid headlines: not only was Hubbard accused of bigamy and kidnapping, but she had been subjected to "systematic torture, including loss of sleep, beatings, and strangulations and scientific experiments". Because of his "crazy misconduct" she was in "hourly fear of both the life of herself and of her infant daughter, who she has not seen for two months". She had consulted doctors who "concluded that said Hubbard was hopelessly insane, and, crazy, and that there was no hope for said Hubbard, or any reason for her to endure further; that competent medical advisers recommended that said Hubbard be committed to a private sanatorium for psychiatric observation and treatment of a mental ailment known as paranoid schizophrenia."

Her lawyer, Caryl Warner, also worked the media on her behalf so that Northrup's story received maximum publicity. He briefed the divorce court reporters for the Los Angeles Times and the Examiner, who were both women and early feminists, to ensure that "they knew what a bastard this guy Hubbard was." He later told Hubbard's unofficial biographer, Russell Miller:

I liked Sara and Miles a lot. They eventually married and got a house in Malibu and we became friends; I remember they introduced me to pot. I believed Sara absolutely; there was no question about the truth in my opinion. When she first came to me with this wild story about how her husband had taken her baby I was determined to help her all I could. I telephoned Hubbard's lawyer in Elizabeth and warned him: "Listen, asshole, if you don't get that baby back I'm going to burn you."

The divorce writ prompted a deluge of bad publicity for Hubbard and elicited an unexpected letter to Northrup from his first wife, Polly, who wrote: "If I can help in any way I'd like to—You must get Alexis in your custody—Ron is not normal. I had hoped that you could straighten him out. Your charges sound fantastic to the average person—but I've been through it—the beatings, threats on my life, all the sadistic traits you charge—twelve years of it ... Please do believe I do so want to help you get Alexis."

In May 1951, Northrup filed a further complaint against Hubbard, accusing him of having fled to Cuba to evade the divorce papers that she was seeking to serve. By that time, however, he had moved to Wichita, Kansas. Northrup's attorney filed another petition asking for Hubbard's assets to be frozen as he had been found "hiding" in Wichita "but that he would probably leave town upon being detected". Hubbard wrote to the FBI to further denounce Northrup as a Communist secret agent. He accused Communists of destroying his business, ruining his health and withholding material of interest to the US Government. His misfortunes had been caused by "a woman known as Sara Elizabeth Northrup . . . whom I believed to be my wife, having married her and then, after some mix-up about a divorce, believed to be my wife in common law." He accused Northrup of having conspired in a bid to assassinate him and described how he had found love letters to his wife from Hollister, a "member of the Young Communists." Her real motive in filing for divorce, he said, was to seize control of Dianetics. He urged the FBI to start a "round-up" of "vermin Communists or ex-Communists", starting with Northrup, and declared:

I believe this woman to be under heavy duress. She was born into a criminal atmosphere, her father having a criminal record. Her half-sister was an inmate of an insane asylum. She was part of a free love colony in Pasadena. She had attached herself to a Jack Parsons, the rocket expert, during the war and when she left him he was a wreck. Further, through Parsons, she was strangely intimate with many scientists of Los Alamo Gordos [Alamogordo in New Mexico was where the first atomic bomb was tested]. I did not know or realize these things until I myself investigated the matter. She may have a record . . . Perhaps in your criminal files or on the police blotter of Pasadena you will find Sara Elizabeth Northrop, age about 26, born April 8, 1925, about 5'9", blond-brown hair, slender . . . I have no revenge motive nor am I trying to angle this broader than it is. I believe she is under duress, that they have something on her and I believe that under a grilling she would talk and turn state's evidence.

Fortunately for Northrup – as it was the peak of the McCarthyite "Red Scare" – Hubbard's allegations were apparently ignored by the FBI, which filed his letter but took no further action. In June 1951, she finally secured the return of Alexis by agreeing to cancel her receivership action and divorce suit in California in return for a divorce "guaranteed by L. Ron Hubbard". She met him in Wichita to resolve the situation. He told her that she was "in a state of complete madness" due to being dictated to and hypnotized by Hollister and his "communist cell". Playing along, she told Hubbard that he was right and that the only way she could break free of their power was by going through with the divorce. He replied, "You know, I'm a public figure and you're nobody, so if you have to go through the divorce, I'll accuse you of desertion so it won't look so bad on my public record." She agreed to sign a statement, written by Hubbard himself, that retracted the allegations that she had made against him:

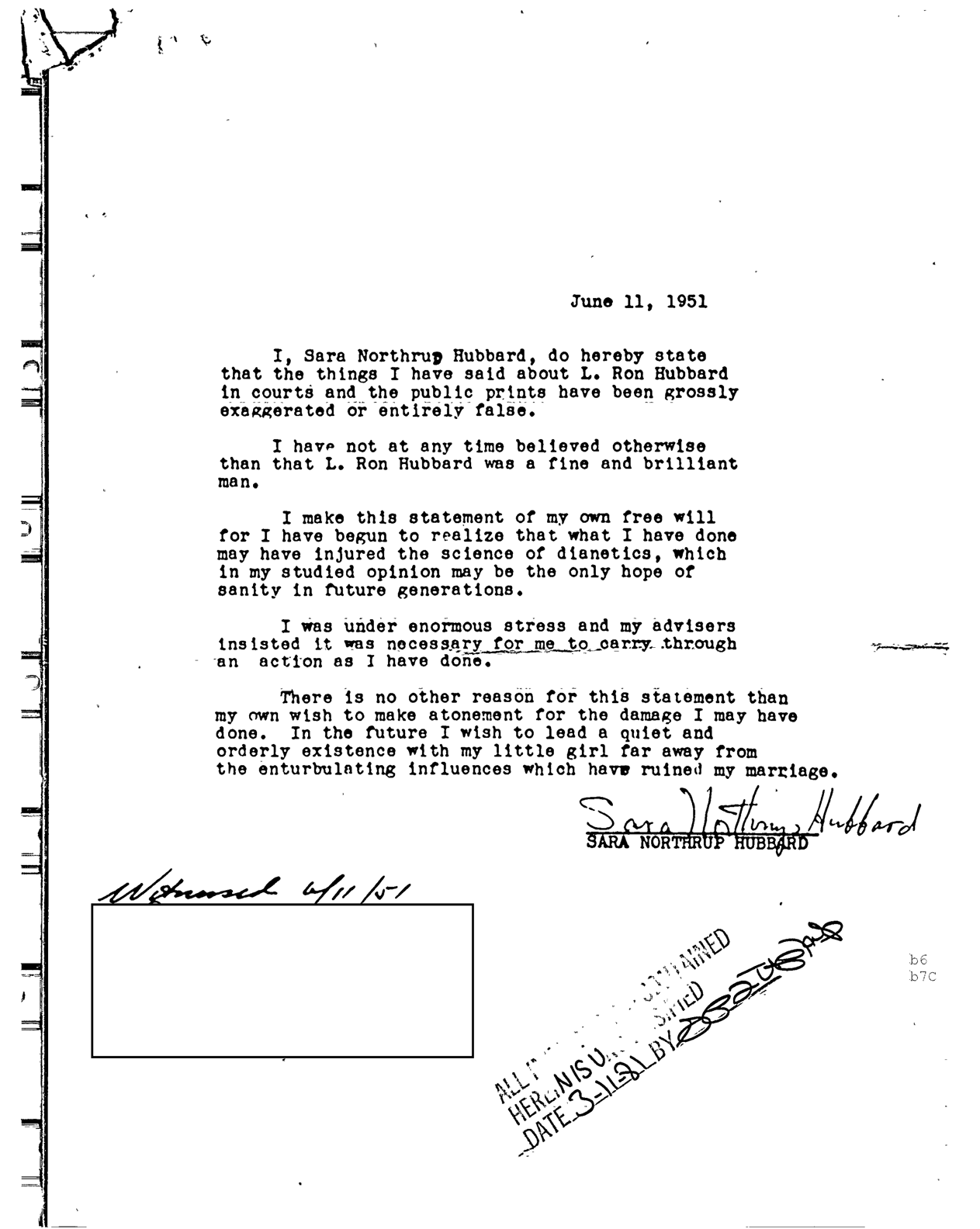
The statement made by Northrup as part of her divorce settlement with Hubbard

I, Sara Northrup Hubbard, do hereby state that the things I have said about L. Ron Hubbard in courts and the public prints have been grossly exaggerated or entirely false.

I have not at any time believed otherwise than that L. Ron Hubbard is a fine and brilliant man.

I make this statement of my own free will for I have begun to realize that what I have done may have injured the science of Dianetics, which in my studied opinion may be the only hope of sanity in future generations.

I was under enormous stress and my advisers insisted it was necessary for me to carry through an action as I have done.

There is no other reason for this statement than my own wish to make atonement for the damage I may have done. In the future I wish to lead a quiet and orderly existence with my little girl far away from the enturbulating influences which have ruined my marriage.

Sara Northrup Hubbard.

Interviewed more than 35 years later, Northrup stated that she had signed the statement because "I thought by doing so he would leave me and Alexis alone. It was horrible. I just wanted to be free of him!"

On June 12, Hubbard was awarded a divorce in the County Court of Sedgwick County, Kansas on the basis of Northrup's "gross neglect of duty and extreme cruelty", which had caused him "nervous breakdown and impairment to health." She did not give evidence but was awarded custody of Alexis and $200 a month in child support. She left Wichita as soon as Alexis was returned to her. Her reunion with her daughter was uncertain to the last, as Hubbard had second thoughts about letting her go as he drove Northrup and Alexis to the local airport. She persuaded him that the compulsion instilled by the communists would be dissipated by going ahead with the flight: "Well, I have to follow their dictates. I'll just go to the airplane." She was so desperate to leave by the time she got to the airport that she left behind her daughter's clothes and her own suitcase and one of Alexis's shoes fell off as she dashed to the plane. "I just ran across the airfield, across the runways, to the airport and got on the plane. And it was the nineteenth of June and it was the happiest day of my life."

== Post divorce ==
After divorcing Hubbard, Northrup married Miles Hollister and bought a house in Malibu, California. Hubbard continued to develop Dianetics (and ultimately Scientology), through which he met his third and last wife, Mary Sue Whipp, in late 1951 – only a few months after his divorce. The controversy surrounding the divorce had severely dented his reputation.

Around the summer of 1951, he explained his flight to Cuba as being a bid to escape Northrup's depredations: "He talked a lot about Sara. When she ran off with another man Ron followed them and they locked him in a hotel room and pushed drugs up his nose, but he managed to escape and went to Cuba." He publicly portrayed his marital problems as being entirely the fault of Northrup and her lover Hollister:

The money and glory inherent in Dianetics was entirely too much for those with whom I had the bad misfortune to associate myself ... including a woman who had represented herself as my wife and who had been cured of severe psychosis by Dianetics, but who, because of structural brain damage would evidently never be entirely sane. ... Fur coats, Lincoln cars and a young man without any concept of honor so far turned the head of the woman who had been associated with me that on discovery of her affairs, she and these others, hungry for money and power, sought to take over and control all of Dianetics.

Many years later, another of his followers, Virginia Downsborough, recalled that during the mid-1960s he "talked a lot about Sara Northrup and seemed to want to make sure that I knew he had never married her. I didn't know why it was so important to him; I'd never met Sara and I couldn't have cared less, but he wanted to persuade me that the marriage had never taken place. When he talked about his first wife, the picture he put out of himself was of this poor wounded fellow coming home from the war and being abandoned by his wife and family because he would be a drain on them." As Downsborough put it, he portrayed himself as "a constant victim of women".

The writer Christopher Evans has noted that "So painful do the memories of these incidents appear to be that L. Ron has more than once denied that he was ever married to Sarah [sic] Northrup at all." He notes as an example of "this apparent erasure of Sarah Northrup from his mind" a 1968 interview with the British broadcaster Granada Television, in which Hubbard denied that he had had a second wife in between his first, Polly, and the present one, Mary Sue:

HUBBARD: "How many times have I been married? I've been married twice. And I'm very happily married just now. I have a lovely wife, and I have four children. My first wife is dead."

INTERVIEWER: "What happened to your second wife?"

HUBBARD: "I never had a second wife."

Granada's reporter commented: "What Hubbard said happens to be untrue. It's an unimportant detail but he's had three wives... What is important is that his followers were there as he lied, but no matter what the evidence they don't believe it." Hubbard also gave a new explanation of why he had been involved with Jack Parsons and O.T.O. After the British Sunday Times newspaper published an exposé of Hubbard's membership of O.T.O. in October 1969, the newspaper printed a statement attributed to the Church of Scientology (but written by Hubbard himself) that asserted:

Hubbard broke up black magic in America... L. Ron Hubbard was still an officer of the US Navy because he was well known as a writer and a philosopher and had friends amongst the physicists, he was sent in to handle the situation. He went to live at the house and investigated the black magic rites and the general situation and found them very bad. Hubbard’s mission was successful far beyond anyone’s expectations. The house was torn down. Hubbard rescued a girl they were using. The black magic group was dispersed and destroyed and has never recovered.

Only a couple of months later, he highlighted Northrup to his staff as a participant in a "full complete covert operation" mounted against Dianetics and Scientology by a "Totalitarian Communistic" enemy. In a memo of December 2, 1969, he wrote that the operation had started with bad reviews of Dianetics, "pushed then by the Sara Komkovadamanov [sic] (alias Northrup) "divorce" actions ... At the back of it was Miles Hollister (psychology student) Sara Komkosadamanov [sic] (housekeeper at the place nuclear physicists stayed near Caltech) ..."

By 1970, Northrup and Hollister had moved to Maui, Hawaii. Northrup's daughter Alexis, who was by now twenty-one years old, attempted to contact her father but was rebuffed in a handwritten statement in which Hubbard denied that he was her father: "Your mother was with me as a secretary in Savannah in late 1948 . . . In July 1949 I was in Elizabeth, New Jersey, writing a movie. She turned up destitute and pregnant."

He said that Northrup had been a Nazi spy during the war and accused her and Hollister of using the divorce case to seize control of Dianetics: "They obtained considerable newspaper publicity, none of it true, and employed the highest priced divorce attorney in the US to sue me for divorce and get the foundation in Los Angeles in settlement. This proved a puzzle since where there is no legal marriage, there can't be any divorce."

Despite clearly being written by Hubbard, who spoke in the first person in the letter, it was signed "Your good friend, J. Edgar Hoover". Even his own staff were shocked by the contents of Hubbard's letter; he ended his instructions to them with the statement, "Decency is not a subject well understood".

Neither Northrup nor Alexis made any further attempt to contact Hubbard, who disinherited Alexis in his will, written in January 1986 on the day before he died. In June 1986 the Church of Scientology and Alexis agreed to a financial settlement under which she was compelled not to write or speak on the subject of L. Ron Hubbard and her relationship to him. An attempt was made to have her sign an affidavit stating that she was in fact the daughter of L. Ron Hubbard's first son, her half-brother L. Ron Hubbard, Jr. In one publication the Church has airbrushed Northrup out of a photograph of the couple that appeared in the Miami Daily News issue of June 30, 1946. The news story which the photograph accompanied has been republished by the Church with all mention of Northrup edited out from the text.

The church continues to promulgate Hubbard's claims about their relationship. The writer Lawrence Wright was told in September 2010 by Tommy Davis, the then spokesman for the Church of Scientology, that Hubbard "was never married to Sara Northrup. She filed for divorce in an effort to try and create a false record that she had been married to him." She had been part of Jack Parsons' group because "she had been sent in there by the Russians. I can never pronounce her name. Her actual true name is a Russian name. That was one of the reasons L. Ron Hubbard never had a relationship with her. He never had a child with her. He wasn't married to her. But he did save her life and pull her out of that whole black magic ring."

Although Northrup did not speak out publicly against her ex-husband following their divorce, she broke her silence in 1972. She wrote privately to Paulette Cooper, the author of the book The Scandal of Scientology who was subsequently targeted by the Church's Operation Freakout. Northrup told Cooper that Hubbard was a dangerous lunatic, and that although her own life had been transformed when she left him, she was still afraid both of him and of his followers, whom she later described as looking "like Mormons, but with bad complexions."

In July 1986 she was interviewed by the ex-Scientologist Bent Corydon several months after Hubbard's death, which had reduced her fear of retaliation. Excerpts from the interview were published in Corydon's 1987 book, L. Ron Hubbard: Messiah or Madman?.

She died of breast cancer in 1997 but in the last few months of her life she dictated a tape-recorded account of her relationship with Hubbard. It is now in the Stephen A. Kent Collection on Alternative Religions at the University of Alberta. Rejecting any suggestion that she was some kind of "pathetic person who has suffered through the years because of my time with Ron", Northrup spoke of her relief that she had been able to put it behind her. She stated that she was "not interested in revenge; I'm interested in the truth."

== Family tree ==
L. Ron Hubbard family tree

Ledora May Waterbury | Harry Ross Hubbard
L. Ron Hubbard
Margaret Grubb | Sara Northrup Hollister | Mary Sue Whipp
L. Ron Hubbard Jr. | Katherine; May | Alexis; Valerie | Diana Hubbard | Quentin Hubbard | Mary Suzette Hubbard | Arthur Hubbard
Deborah DeWolf Kennedy
Jamie DeWolf

== See also ==
- List of Thelemites
- Members of Ordo Templi Orientis
