= Affirmations (L. Ron Hubbard) =

L. Ron Hubbard writing

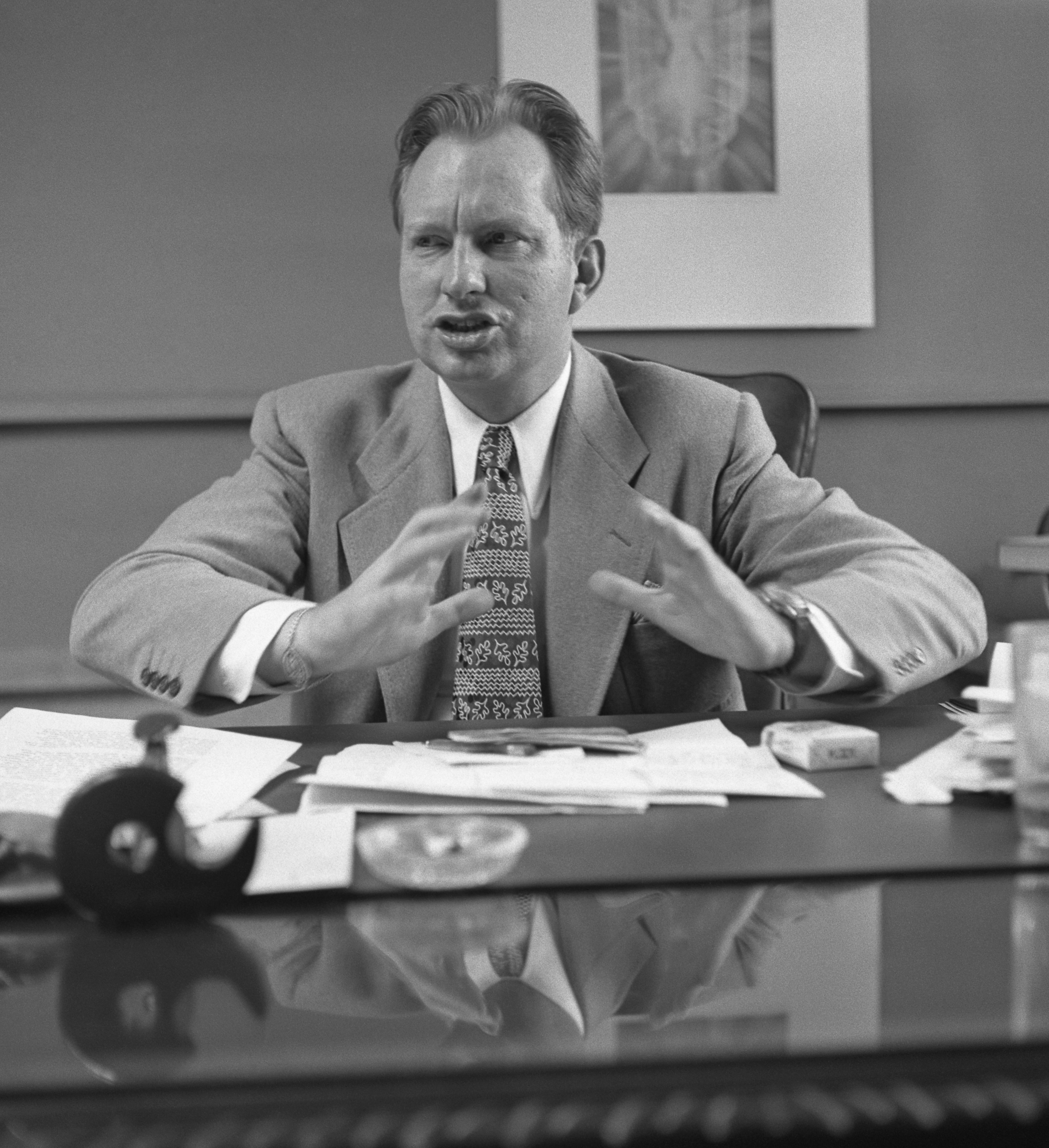
L. Ron Hubbard in 1950, three or four years after reportedly writing the "Affirmations"

The "Affirmations", also referred to as the "Admissions", is a document written around 1946 or 1947. It does not list an author, but it is widely believed to have been written by L. Ron Hubbard, a few years before he established Dianetics (1950), which formed the basis for Scientology (1952). The document consists of a series of statements by and addressed to Hubbard, relating to various physical, sexual, psychological and social issues that he was encountering in his life. After the Affirmations became public knowledge in 1984, the Church of Scientology initially disputed their authenticity. However, they later effectively admitted the document's authorship, describing the work in legal papers as having been "written by" Hubbard and seeking to retain ownership of it.

The Affirmations were intended to be used as a form of self-hypnosis with the intention of resolving Hubbard's psychological problems and instilling a positive mental attitude. They are closely linked to the occult philosophy of Thelema, devised by Aleister Crowley in the early 20th century, in which Hubbard participated for a while in 1945 and 1946. In her book Inside Scientology: The Story of America's Most Secretive Religion, Janet Reitman calls the Affirmations "the most revealing psychological self-assessment, complete with exhortations to himself, that [Hubbard] had ever made".

== Background ==
L. Ron Hubbard had become a well-known writer of pulp fiction stories in the 1930s before he joined the United States Navy in 1941, a few months before the US entered World War II. His military career was not a success; he was removed from both of the vessels that he commanded after disagreements with his superiors and an incident in which he inadvertently shelled neutral Mexico. He spent a lengthy spell in hospital with chronic stomach ulcers in the last year of the war. After the war ended in 1945 he moved in with Jack Parsons, a rocket scientist and occultist who shared a large house in Pasadena, California with various like-minded individuals. Hubbard was an enthusiastic participant in the sex magic rituals which Parsons, a member of Aleister Crowley's Ordo Templi Orientis (OTO), performed with the aid of his girlfriend and muse, Sara "Betty" Northrup, who was 20–21 years old in 1945. Hubbard subsequently eloped with Sara to Florida and eventually married her bigamously, without divorcing his first wife Polly, whom he had abandoned in Washington state along with their young son L. Ron Jr.

At some point around 1946 or 1947, Hubbard is said to have composed what have become known as the "Affirmations" or "Admissions". They were written with the intention of reading them into a recording device and playing them back to himself as a form of self-hypnosis. The document came to light in the 1984 court case Church of Scientology v. Gerald Armstrong when the Church of Scientology's former archivist, Gerry Armstrong, read sections of them into the record against the strong objections of the church's lawyers. Other sections of the document were subsequently posted on the Internet by Armstrong after someone anonymously emailed a copy of the Affirmations to him in 2000. The document was named "Affirmations" by Omar V. Garrison, a British writer hired by the Church of Scientology to write an official biography of Hubbard.

In the Armstrong case in 1984, Hubbard's wife's lawyer acknowledged that the document, written in Hubbard's handwriting, was by Hubbard himself, and claimed that it was part of his "research". It was, he said, "far and away the most private and personal document probably that I have ever read by anybody". Armstrong's lawyer agreed, commenting that "most Scientologists ... if they read these documents would leave the organization five minutes after they read them." The church argued that they constituted "a kind of self-therapy". It later backtracked, claiming that Hubbard had not written the document. However, as part of the agreement with the Church of Scientology that settled the 1984 case, Armstrong was required to return "all originals and copies of the documents commonly known as the 'Affirmations' written by L. Ron Hubbard". As religious studies scholar Hugh Urban comments, "here the church clearly indicates that the text was written by L. Ron Hubbard, and it seems difficult to understand why the church would file suit to retain ownership of the text were it not an authentic document."

== Contents of the Affirmations ==
The Affirmations is a semi-autobiographical text in which Hubbard confronts several problems in his life, from his failures in his naval career to his health and sexual problems. Hubbard intends to overcome them by self-hypnosis, affirming his ambitions and personal well-being. The Affirmations are voluminous, with the introduction alone running to thirty pages. According to Reitman, "the affirmations went on for pages, as Hubbard repeatedly avowed his magical power, sexual attractiveness, good health, strong memory, and literary talent."

The document is divided into three sections: Course I, Course II and The Book.

=== Course I ===
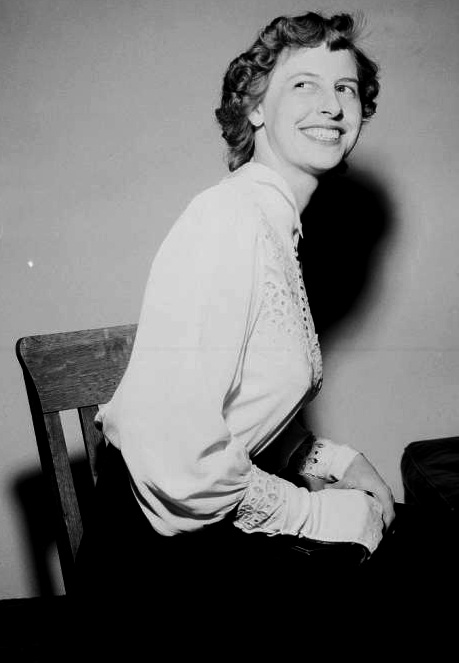
Sara "Betty" Northrup, Hubbard's "young, beautiful, desirable" second wife

The first section sets out Hubbard's aim in writing the Affirmations. He describes it as an "experiment" whose purpose "is to re-establish the ambition, willpower, desire to survive, the talent and confidence of myself". He refers to his anxieties and insecurities, particularly relating to his writing and naval careers: "I was always anxious about people's opinion of me and was afraid I would bore them. This injected anxiety and careless speed into my work. I must be convinced that I can write skilfully and well ... I must be convinced I have succeeded in writing and with ease will regain my popularity, which actually was not small." His naval career was a source of angst (a theme to which he returned in the other sections of the Affirmations); he wrote, accurately enough, that "my service record was none too glorious".

Sex and relationships are a major theme in Course I. Hubbard writes that he is ashamed of his frequent affairs and his determination to succeed with the "young, beautiful, desirable" Sara, though he admits that he is hindered by impotence: "I want her always. But I am 13 years older than she. She is heavily sexed. My libido is so low I hardly admire her naked." He had suffered sexually transmitted diseases and was treating his impotence with testosterone supplements. He wrote: "By eliminating certain fears of hypnosis, curing my rheumatism and laying off hormones, I hope to restore my former libido. I must!"

Hubbard appears to have believed that he could overcome his insecurities and physical weaknesses by focusing on a series of positive statements. Thus:

- "I can write."
- "My mind is still brilliant."
- "That masturbation was no sin or crime."
- "That I do not need to have ulcers any more."
- "That I am fortunate in losing Polly and my parents, for they never meant well by me."
- "That I believe in my gods and spiritual things."
- "That my magical work is powerful and effective."
- "That the numbers 7, 25, and 16 are not unlucky or evil for me."
- "That I am not bad to look upon."
- "That I am not susceptible to colds."
- "That Sara is always beautiful to me."
- "That these words and commands are like fire and will sear themselves into every corner of my being, making me happy and well and confident forever!"

=== Course II ===
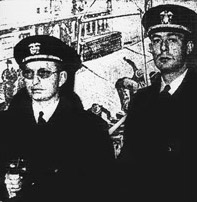
Hubbard (left) as a US Navy officer, 1943. His unsuccessful naval career was a major preoccupation of the Affirmations.

The second section comprises the statements that have been referred to as the Affirmations. Hubbard appears to have intended them to be self-hypnotic, as they start with the command "You are asleep." He was well known to his peers as an accomplished hypnotist and liked to give demonstrations of his abilities. In one demonstration to the Los Angeles science fiction society in April 1948, he hypnotised almost everyone in the society's clubroom. One member was convinced he was holding a pair of miniature kangaroos in the palm of his hand; another was persuaded that the floor was becoming so hot that he took off his shoes; and a third had a ten-minute conversation on an imaginary telephone with an equally imaginary car salesman.

Many of the Affirmations relate to Hubbard's health problems, which were recorded at length in his Veterans Administration files; for instance:

- "Your eyes are getting progressively better. They became bad when you used them as an excuse to escape the naval academy. You have no reason to keep them bad."
- "Your stomach trouble you used as an excuse to keep the Navy from punishing you. You are free of the Navy."
- "Your hip is a pose. You have a sound hip. It never hurts. Your shoulder never hurts."
- "Your foot was an alibi. The injury is no longer needed."

Others concern Hubbard's views towards women and sex, a significant issue in his life (he was to have three wives and seven children, with numerous other affairs on the side):

- "Testosterone blends easily with your own hormones . . . You have no fear of what any woman may think of your bed conduct. You know you are a master. You know they will be thrilled. You can come many times without weariness . . . Many women are not capable of pleasure in sex and anything adverse they say or do has no effect whatever upon your pleasure."
- "You have no fear if they conceive. What if they do? You do not care. Pour it into them and let fate decide."
- "You can tell all the romantic tales you wish. ... But you know which ones were lies ... You have enough real experience to make anecdotes forever. Stick to your true adventures."
- "Masturbation does not injure or make insane. Your parents were in error. Everyone masturbates."

Some of the Affirmations relate to Hubbard's views on how he related with others:

- "You have no urge to talk about your navy life. You do not like to talk of it. You never illustrate your point with bogus stories. It is not necessary for you to lie to be amusing and witty."
- "You like to have your intimate friends approve of and love you for what you are. This desire to be loved does not amount to a psychosis."
- "Your psychology is advanced and true and wonderful. It hypnotizes people. It predicts their emotions, for you are their ruler."

Hubbard also expressed his ambitions for the future:

- "Material things are yours for the asking. Men are your slaves."
- "You will make fortunes writing."
- "You will live to be 200 years old."
- "You will always look young."
- "Money will flood in upon you."

Finally, a significant number of the Affirmations relate to Hubbard's "Guardian". In 1945, Parsons had written to Aleister Crowley to inform him that Hubbard had become his "magical partner" and described Hubbard's beliefs: "From some of his experiences I deduced that he is in direct touch with some higher intelligence, possibly his Guardian Angel. He describes his Angel as a beautiful winged woman with red hair whom he calls the Empress and who has guided him through his life and saved him many times." Hubbard appears to have continued to believe in his Guardian Angel well after leaving Parsons's circle and wrote in his Affirmations:

- "Nothing can intervene between you and your Guardian. She cannot be displaced because she is too powerful. She does not control you. She advises you."
- "The most thrilling thing in your life is your love and consciousness of your Guardian."
- "She has copper red hair, long braids, a lovely Venusian face, a white gown belted with jade squares. She wears gold slippers."
- "You can talk with her and audibly hear her voice above all others."
- "You can do automatic writing whenever you wish. You do not care what comes out on the paper when your Guardian dictates."

=== The Book ===
The last part of the document is titled "The Book", which appears to allude to his authorship in mid-1938 of a still-unpublished manuscript called Excalibur, which he refers to as The One Commandment in the Affirmations. He wrote that it had "freed you forever from the fears of the material world and gave you material control over people." The document lists Hubbard's personal goals, self-compliments and statements of what he believed (or wanted to believe) were his extraordinary qualities. For instance:

- "You are radiant like sunlight."
- "You can read music."
- "You are a magnificent writer who has thrilled millions."
- "Ability to drop into a trance state at will."
- "Lack of necessity of following a pulp pattern."
- "You did a fine job in the Navy. No one there is now 'out to get you.'"
- "You are psychic."
- "You do not masturbate."
- "You do not know anger. Your patience is infinite."
- "Snakes are not dangerous to you. There are no snakes in the bottom of your bed."
- "You believe implicitly in God. You have no doubts of the All Powerful. You believe your Guardian perfectly."

== Analysis and interpretations ==
Lawrence Wright suggests in his book Going Clear: Scientology, Hollywood, and the Prison of Belief that in the Affimations "Hubbard is using techniques on himself that he would later develop into Dianetics." He draws parallels with the practice of "auditing" used in Dianetics and Scientology, noting that the Affirmations and Dianetics both involve tackling difficult memories that hold back mental and spiritual progress. The Affirmations themselves are intended to overcome the psychological effects of these memories. Wright calls the Affirmations "certainly be the most revealing and intimate disclosures Hubbard ever made about himself" and comments that they reveal "a man who is ashamed of his tendency to fabricate personal stories, who is conflicted about his sexual needs, and who worries about his mortality. He has a predatory view of women but at the same time fears their power to humiliate him."

Hugh Urban links the Affirmations with the magical practices that Hubbard participated in while a member of the OTO. He notes that Hubbard refers to the Affirmations as "incantations", which suggests that he intended them to be a magical ritual. Indeed, one of the Affirmations is "that my magical work is powerful and effective". During his stay with Parsons, Hubbard had come to regard himself as an adept or "magus", an enlightened spiritual being existing on a higher spiritual plane than the rest of the human race. Urban highlights Hubbard's repeated invocations of the Guardian, his spiritual adviser. This concept is drawn directly from Aleister Crowley's book Magick in Theory and Practice, which advocates that "adepts" should make it a priority to get in touch with their Guardian. Like Crowley's Magick, Hubbard's Affirmations assert that he was all-powerful and invulnerable because of his contact with the Guardian:

God and your Guardian and your own power bring destruction on those who would injure you. But you never speak of this for you are kind. A sphere of light, invisible to others, surrounds you as a protecting globe. All forces bounce away from you off this.

Janet Reitman and Urban both note that the Affirmations contain themes that reappeared later in Scientology. Reitman points to one Affirmation that foreshadows Hubbard's future interest in mental healing: "You understand all the workings of the minds of humans around you, for you are a doctor of minds, bodies and influences." Len Oakes writes that Hubbard appears to have been so convinced of the power of his words that he used them "to make love to an image of himself." He characterises Hubbard's belief as a symptom of "an infantile, magical view of the world wherein one only need wish to make it so" and comments that beneath Hubbard's "freewheeling, lying exterior was a rigid, driven, superstitious mind-set desperate to win every time."

== See also ==
- Scientology and the occult
