= Margaret Grubb =

American aviator (1907–1963)

- Margaret "Polly" Grubb
- Born: September 22, 1907; Beltsville, Maryland, United States
- Died: November 17, 1963 (aged 56); United States
- Occupation: Glider pilot
- Spouses: L. Ron Hubbard (m. 1933–1947) John Tilghman Ochs (m. 1958)
- Children: L. Ron Hubbard Jr. Katherine May Hubbard
- Relatives: Jamie DeWolf (great-grandson)

Margaret Louise "Polly" Grubb (September 22, 1907 – November 17, 1963) was the first wife of pulp fiction author and Scientology founder L. Ron Hubbard, to whom she was married between 1933 and 1947. She was the mother of Hubbard's first son, L. Ron Hubbard Jr., and his first daughter, Katherine May "Kay" Hubbard.

== Background ==
Margaret Louise Grubb was born in Beltsville, Maryland, in 1907, the only child of Elizabeth (née Crissey) and Thomas Lloyd Grubb. They were a farming family and her father operated a plant nursery in Montgomery County, Maryland. His family had settled in Loudoun County, Virginia, in 1762 from Brandywine Hundred, Delaware, and he was a descendant of John Grubb, who originally came from Cornwall in 1677. Margaret's mother Elizabeth died when she was young.

Although christened Margaret, Grubb preferred to be known as Polly. She lived with her father in Elkton, Maryland. She took her first job, in a shoe shop, at the age of sixteen, to support herself and her father.

Grubb was a keen glider pilot and met L. Ron Hubbard on a Maryland gliding field in early 1933, where both of them were learning to fly as preparation to obtaining a pilot's license. At the time, Hubbard was self-employed as a writer of pulp fiction stories. The two began a relationship after going on a blind date.

== Marriage ==
Hubbard and Grubb married on April 13, 1933, after only a short courtship. They settled in Laytonsville, Maryland. She had a miscarriage not long afterwards, and became pregnant again in October 1933.

On May 7, 1934, Grubb gave birth two months prematurely to L. Ronald Hubbard Jr. (died September 16, 1991, in Carson City, Nevada), while on a vacation with her husband at Encinitas, California. Ron Jr. legally changed his name to Ronald Edward DeWolf in 1972, and the new name is thusly reflected in the California Birth Index, 1905–1995. On January 15, 1936, the couple had a daughter, Katherine May (or "Kay"), in New York City.

In the spring of 1936 the Hubbards moved to Bremerton, Washington, to be near Hubbard's own family, the Waterburys. They settled in the community of South Colby, Washington, where Hubbard established a "writing studio" from where he produced many of his pulp short stories and novels. The marriage came under strain when Hubbard began spending increasingly long periods in New York in order to be nearer his publishers and fellow pulp writers. Grubb suspected that he was having affairs with other women in New York and confided her suspicions to family friends. According to Robert MacDonald Ford, a friend who later became a state representative, matters came to a head when she found hard evidence of her husband's philandering:

It seems Ron had written letters to a couple of girls in New York and left them in the mail box to be picked up. Polly found them and got so mad that she opened the envelopes, switched the letters and put them back in the box. She didn't tell him what she had done until they had been picked up.

The couple appear to have patched up their relationship afterwards, as they went on an extended sailing trip to Alaska in July 1938. Three years later Hubbard entered the US Navy for war service. Other than a period in 1943 when Hubbard was stationed in Astoria, Oregon, during the fitting out of the ill-fated USS PC-815, she appears to have seen relatively little of her husband. It was clear by the end of the war that the marriage was doomed. She had briefly considered moving to California to be with her husband during his posting there, but decided not to, as she did not want to uproot her children. By this time she had moved in with Hubbard's parents in Bremerton.

For his part, Hubbard had moved in with the rocket scientist and occultist John Whiteside Parsons in Pasadena, California, and had begun an intense affair with Parsons' girlfriend Sara Northrup Hollister. By her own account, Grubb did not see Hubbard at all between 1945 and June 1947. Hubbard later said that she had "become involved with another man and when her service allotment ceased just before the war's end, sought to obtain and was refused a divorce."

== Divorce ==
On August 10, 1946, Hubbard married Sara Hollister, with whom he had been living for about a year. Grubb filed for divorce in Port Orchard, Washington, on April 14, 1947, on the grounds of "desertion and non-support", since neither she nor her children were obtaining any support from her absent husband. She had no idea that he had already committed bigamy by being married to another woman, nor did Hollister know until then about Grubb. According to Hollister, "I did not discover that he was still married to her until after the divorce proceedings had begun." Hubbard agreed to the divorce on June 1 and subsequently agreed to Grubb having custody of the children, costs, and $25 a month maintenance for each child. The divorce was final on December 24, 1947. Hubbard later said that "it was I who obtained the divorce and have never really had an upset marital background" and that he got the divorce when "I was written to and advised by the judge that I should obtain one as he was tired of service wives deserting their husbands."

Hubbard appears to have avoided meeting his side of the agreement in the divorce decree. Around February/March 1951, Grubb sued him for maintenance, charging that her former husband had "promoted a cult called Dianetics", had authored the bestseller Dianetics: The Modern Science of Mental Health, owned valuable property, and was well able to afford payment of maintenance for his two children. She demanded 42 months of support payments that Hubbard had failed to make since their settlement, totaling $2,503.79. Hubbard had also failed to pay a debt to the National Bank of Commerce, taken out in 1940, which with interest now came to $889.55. Hubbard responded by saying that Grubb should not have custody of the children because she "drinks to excess and is a dipsomaniac".

In April 1951, Hollister filed for a divorce from Hubbard after he left for Cuba with their daughter Alexis Valerie, accusing him of "paranoid schizophrenia" and of subjecting her to "systematic torture". The case made newspaper headlines, as Hubbard was by now famous following the success of Dianetics. Grubb evidently saw the headlines and wrote to Hollister on May 2 to tell her:

If I can help in any way, I'd like to – you must get Alexis in your custody – Ron is not normal. I had hoped that you could straighten him out. Your charges probably sound fantastic to the average person – but I've been through it – the beatings, threats on my life, all the sadistic traits you charge – twelve years of it. I haven't asked for anything but with the money rolling in from "Dianetics" I had hoped to get enough for plastic surgery for Kay's birthmark – Please believe I do so want to help you get Alexis.

=== Remarries ===
Although she played a major part in Hubbard's life, Grubb is not mentioned in official Church of Scientology biographies. Indeed, Hubbard said in an interview for the British television series World in Action that he had only been married twice and had four children. In fact, he actually had seven children, but was counting only those he had with his third wife, Mary Sue Hubbard, and omitted mentioning his marriage to Sara Northrup Hollister:

HUBBARD: "How many times have I been married? I've been married twice. And I'm very happily married just now. I have a lovely wife, and I have four children. My first wife is dead."

INTERVIEWER: "What happened to your second wife?"

HUBBARD: "I never had a second wife."

Grubb later married John Ochs and moved to Pennsylvania. She died at the age of 56 on November 17, 1963.

== Family tree ==
L. Ron Hubbard family tree

Ledora May Waterbury	Harry Ross Hubbard
L. Ron Hubbard
Margaret Grubb	Sara Northrup Hollister	Mary Sue Whipp
L. Ron Hubbard Jr.	Katherine; May	Alexis; Valerie	Diana Hubbard	Quentin Hubbard	Mary Suzette Hubbard	Arthur Hubbard
Deborah DeWolf Kennedy
Jamie DeWolf
