= Pat Broeker =

Scientologist assistant to L. Ron Hubbard

Patrick D. Broeker
- Born: 1950 (age 75–76); United States
- Spouse: Annie Tidman (Divorced)

Pat Broeker (born 1950) is a former high-ranking member of the Church of Scientology who, along with his wife Annie Broeker, was one of the few people in direct contact with L. Ron Hubbard in his final years. He and his wife, and driver Steve "Sarge" Pfauth, left with Hubbard from his home in Hemet, California in 1980 and travelled around California in a motorhome until buying and settling at a ranch in San Luis Obispo County in 1983. The Broekers and Pfauth stayed with Hubbard until his death in January 1986. Due to ongoing investigations by the FBI and IRS following the arrests of high-ranking Scientologists, including Hubbard's wife Mary Sue Hubbard over Operation Snow White, the location of the ranch was kept secret and visits from Church management were forbidden while Hubbard was alive.

== Working for L. Ron Hubbard ==
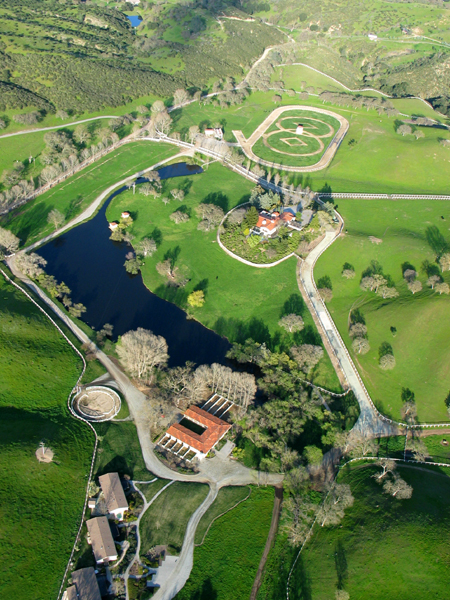
The Creston ranch as seen in 2005

In April 1979, Scientology's Watchdog Committee (WDC) was created out of senior executives from the Commodore's Messenger Organization (CMO) to become the most senior management body for the Church and its entities. Until this time, the CMO was attached directly to Hubbard. Under WDC, CMO took the title "CMO International" and became the "execution arm for Watchdog Committee." In 1981, the All Clear Unit was set up at CMO International to deal with ongoing civil litigation against the Church of Scientology and investigations by the Internal Revenue Service. The purpose was to ensure an "All Clear" for Hubbard to emerge from hiding. As head of the unit, David Miscavige took orders from and relayed information to Hubbard via Broeker.

After three years of travelling, in 1983 Hubbard, Pat and Annie Broeker, and Stephen Pfauth as handyman and security, moved to a permanent residence in Creston, California, where they purchased a ranch named "Whispering Winds". Broeker purchased a second ranch near Newberry Springs as an intermediary meetup location with David Miscavige, and potentially serve as a safe house for Hubbard if the Creston ranch cover was blown.

From his motorhome—in which he lived at the ranch due to the house being remodeled—Hubbard would dictate communiques for Church of Scientology management. Broeker was the middleman delivering Hubbard's communications to Church management, making elaborate arrangements for clandestine meetings with a Church intermediary as a buffer to insulate Hubbard and keep his whereabouts unknown. Initially David Miscavige was just the driver, but eventually he took over the role of intermediary and continued to conduct the regular secret meetings directly with Broeker.

== After Hubbard's death ==
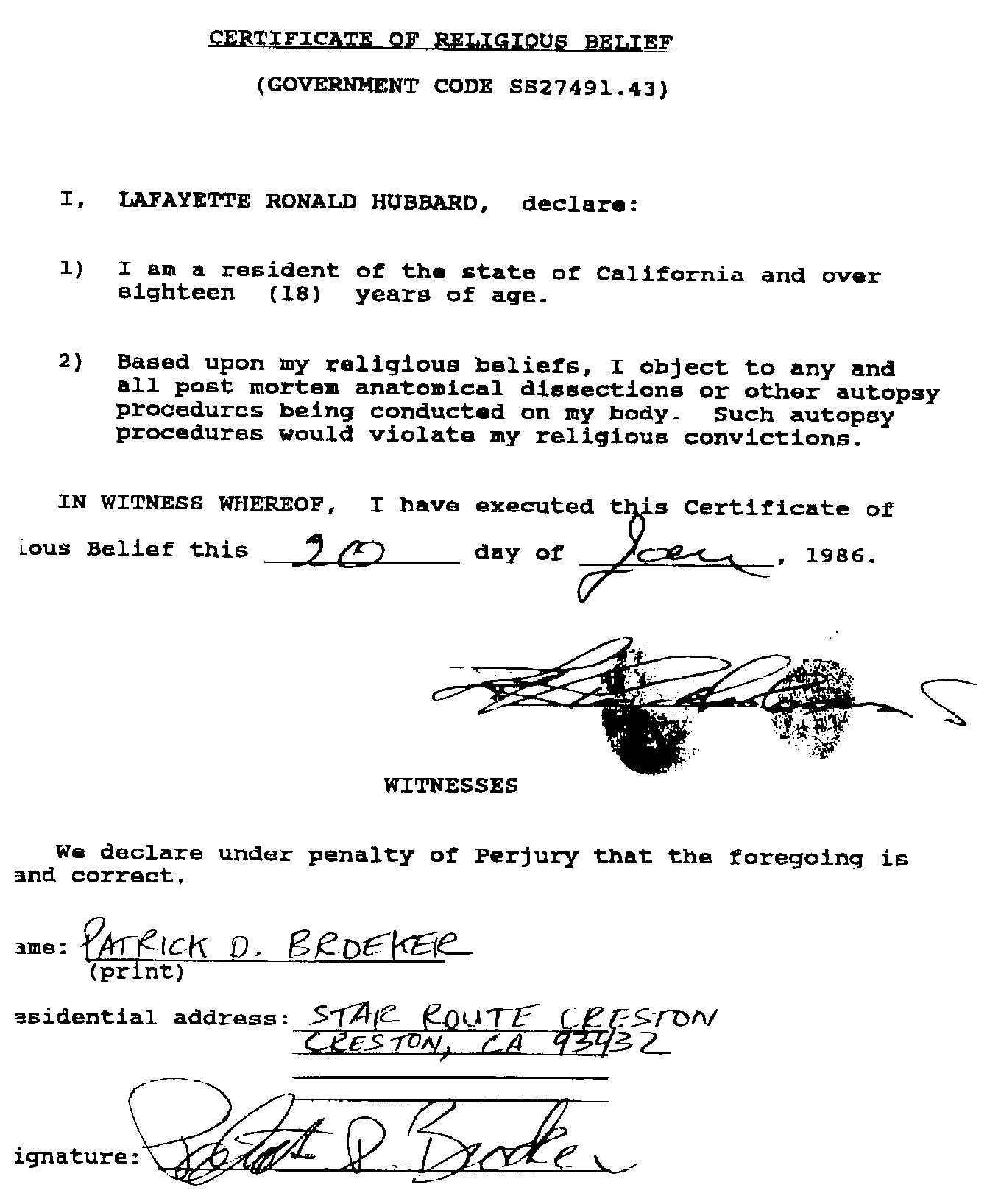
Pat Broeker witness and signatory on L. Ron Hubbard post-mortem instructions dated 6 days before Hubbard's death

Broeker spoke on stage at the January 27, 1986 event where it was announced that Hubbard had died. Broeker was introduced by David Miscavige:

"When LRH left in 1980 to do his researches he took with him his two most trusted friends and companions. These two people were Pat Broeker and Annie Broeker. They lived and worked with him for the last six years during the time period of this research. And this evening Pat Broeker is here to speak to you in regards to that. Please welcome him..."

Following the event, the Broekers presented a Flag Order memo, said to have been written by Hubbard before he died, in which Hubbard specified that Pat and Annie Broeker should succeed him as the heads of the Church following his death in Flag Order 3879, 19 January 1986, "The Sea Org and the Future", promoting himself to Admiral and appointing them as First and Second Loyal Officers, two new Sea Org ranks not previously designated. 14 months later however, the Broekers and others allied with them were removed and replaced with senior Sea Org executives handpicked by Miscavige. Miscavige took the position of "Chairman of the Board" of Religious Technology Center. On 18 April 1988 Miscavige published a follow-up memo stating that the original memo was a forgery and was cancelled.

Robert Vaughn Young was assigned to the ranch after Hubbard's death and had got to know Broeker in the following months. In a 1994 court case Young stated that "... A power struggle ensued after Hubbard's death between Broeker and Miscavige." He alleged that anyone seen to be in the "Broeker camp" was purged leading to Miscavige eventually taking control of the Church by force.

In a speech given in Hamburg in 2010, former high-ranking Sea Org member Jesse Prince admitted that Miscavige had no choice but to oust Broeker. He said of Pat Broeker:

"But he’s insane, too. I mean, this guy, you can’t have a rational conversation with him. I mean, you start talking to him about apples and the next thing you know we’re talking about growing pineapples, you know? It was very difficult to talk to this person. I mean, he was not lucid in his mind. And Miscavige had a valid problem: what would happen if this guy took over Scientology? He’s nuts; he’ll tear it all up. ... Well, he made the decision: I’m getting rid of him."

== After Scientology ==
In 2009, Tampa Bay Times reported that after Broeker left the church in 1989 and moved to Colorado, David Miscavige hired private detectives for $32,000 a month to surveil him. They followed him for the next two decades to Wyoming and ten years in the Czech Republic, where he went to medical school and worked as an English teacher. In June 2011, at an apartment complex owned by the Church of Scientology, his ex-wife Annie Tidman died of cancer.

In 2012, Paul Marrick and Greg Arnold, the two private detectives who had followed Broeker for 25 years, were later assigned to follow and record Marty Rathbun. They sued the Church of Scientology for breach of contract when the organization failed to pay them for their investigations.
