= Robert MacDonald Ford =

American politician

Robert Ford

Member of the Washington House of Representatives for the 23rd district
- In office 1941–1943
- In office 1945–1953

King County Commissioner
- In office February 1, 1962 – November 1, 1962
- Preceded by: Howard Odell
- Succeeded by: John T. O'Brien

Personal details
- Born: Robert MacDonald Ford; May 2, 1911
- Died: June 9, 2004 (aged 93) Bainbridge Island, Washington, U.S.
- Party: Democratic

Robert MacDonald Ford Jr. (May 2, 1911 – June 9, 2004) was an American insurance agent who served as a Democratic state representative for the Bremerton area of the State of Washington from 1941 to 1943 and from 1945 to 1953. Ford was the Democratic Floor Leader of the House of Representatives; Chairman of the House Highways Committee; and instrumental in the creation of the Agate Pass Bridge between Bainbridge Island and the Olympic Peninsula.

Ford was born in New Rochelle, New York in 1911; graduated from high school in Glendale, California and earned degrees in economics and political science from the University of Washington in Seattle. He served in the United States Navy during World War II on minesweepers in Iceland and at the landing at Salerno.

Ford served as King County, Washington County Commissioner during the Seattle World's Fair and was instrumental in King County's acquisition of MaryMoor Farm/Park and later served as the manager of Seattle's Boeing Field.

He married Nancy Elizabeth McFate of South Colby, Washington; they had a daughter and a son. He died on June 9, 2004, on Bainbridge Island at the age of 93, and was survived by his children Robert MacDonald Ford, III and Linda J. Ford (Cauthers).

He is known to history as a fellow sailor and close friend of Scientology founder L. Ron Hubbard. Ford said that when Hubbard asked for a letter of introduction, he gave Hubbard a blank sheet of letterhead which he later wasn't sure if he had signed, and told Hubbard, "You're the writer, you write it."
