= Mary Sue Hubbard =

Third wife of L. Ron Hubbard (1931–2002)

- Mary Sue Hubbard in 1957
- Born: June 17, 1931; Rockdale, Texas, U.S.
- Died: November 25, 2002 (aged 71); Los Angeles, California, U.S.
- Education: University of Texas at Austin
- Occupations: Author, Marriage Hats; Compiler, The Book of E-Meter Drills; Auditor, Scientology; Controller, Guardian's Office
- Spouse: L. Ron Hubbard (m. 1952; died 1986)
- Children: 4, including Diana and Quentin

Mary Sue Hubbard (née Whipp; June 17, 1931 – November 25, 2002) was the third wife of L. Ron Hubbard, from 1952 until his death in 1986. She was a leading figure in Scientology for much of her life. The Hubbards had four children: Diana (born 1952), Quentin (1954–1976), Suzette (born 1955), and Arthur (born 1958).

She became involved in Hubbard's Dianetics in 1951, while still a student at the University of Texas at Austin, becoming a Dianetics auditor. She soon became involved in a relationship with Hubbard and married him in March 1952. She accompanied her husband to Phoenix, Arizona, where they established the Hubbard Association of Scientologists – the forerunner of the Church of Scientology, which was itself founded in 1953. She was credited with helping to coin the word "Scientology", going on to play a leading role in the management of the Church of Scientology and rising to become the head of the Church's Guardian's Office (GO). In August 1978, she was indicted by the United States government on charges of conspiracy relating to illegal covert operations mounted by the Guardian's Office against government agencies. She was convicted in December 1979 and was sentenced to five years' imprisonment and the payment of a $10,000 fine. She was forced to resign her post in 1981 and served a year in prison in 1983, after exhausting her appeals against her conviction.

In the late 1990s, Hubbard fell ill with breast cancer and died in 2002.

== Early life and involvement in Dianetics ==
Mary Sue Whipp was born in Rockdale, Texas, to Harry Hughes Whipp (Sept 2, 1893 – Oct 30, 1942) and Mary Catherine (née Hill) Whipp. She grew up in Houston, where she attended Rice University for a year before moving on to the University of Texas at Austin, from which she graduated as a Bachelor of Arts. She originally intended to work in petroleum research, but a friend persuaded her to travel with him to Wichita, Kansas, in mid-1951 to take a Dianetics course at the Hubbard Dianetic Foundation. She soon began an affair with Hubbard, who had just been divorced from his second wife Sara, and moved in with him within a few weeks of arriving in Wichita. She obtained a Hubbard Dianetic Auditor's Certificate and joined the Foundation's staff.

She became pregnant in February 1952, and married Hubbard the next month. By this time, the Foundation had filed for bankruptcy, and Hubbard's erstwhile backer, Don Purcell, was left to deal with its substantial debts. A bitter dispute broke out between the men over the ownership of the Foundation's remaining assets, with Hubbard resigning to start a rival "Hubbard College" on the other side of Wichita. Mary Sue was given partial responsibility for running the new Dianetics establishment. After six weeks of operation, it was replaced in April 1952 by the Hubbard Association of Scientologists, established in Phoenix, Arizona, to promote Hubbard's newly announced "science of certainty".

== The establishment and expansion of Scientology ==
The Hubbards traveled to England in September 1952 when Mary Sue was eight months pregnant. According to the Church of Scientology, the reason for the trip was that "amid the constant violence of the turncoat Don J. Purcell of Wichita and his suits which attempted to seize Scientology, Mary Sue became ill and to save her life, Ron took her to England where several Dianetic groups had asked him to form an organization." Russell Miller gives a different explanation: "Hubbard wanted to go to London to establish his control over the small Dianetics group which had formed there spontaneously and Mary Sue insisted on accompanying him." Three weeks later, on September 24, 1952, she gave birth to her first child, Diana Meredith de Wolfe Hubbard. The Hubbards returned to the United States in November when their visa expired and moved into an apartment in Philadelphia.

They went back to London in December on a fresh visa and stayed there until the end of May 1953, before departing for an extended holiday in Spain. In October 1953, they returned to the US where Hubbard gave a series of lectures in Camden, New Jersey, and established the first Church of Scientology. By this time, Mary Sue was well advanced with her second pregnancy and remained largely confined to a rented house at Medford Lakes, New Jersey. They traveled to Phoenix for Christmas 1953, and it was there on January 6, 1954, that Mary Sue gave birth to her second child, Geoffrey Quentin McCaully Hubbard.

The Hubbards lived at a house on Tatum Boulevard (now 5501 North 44th Street) on the slopes of Camelback Mountain in Phoenix for the remainder of 1954. By this time, Mary Sue had become a key figure within the nascent Scientology movement. Although Hubbard himself was much admired by Scientologists, his wife was said to be much less popular. Russell Miller notes:

They were indeed an unlikely couple – a flamboyant, fast-talking extrovert entrepreneur in his forties and a quiet, intense young woman twenty years his junior from a small town in Texas. But anyone who underestimated Mary Sue made a big mistake. Although she was not yet twenty-four years old, she exercised considerable power within the Scientology movement and people around Hubbard quickly learned to be wary of her. Fiercely loyal to her husband, brusque and autocratic, she could be a dangerous enemy.

A family friend, Ray Kemp, later recalled: "their relationship seemed OK, but there never seemed to be a lot of love between them. She was not the affectionate type, she was more efficient than affectionate. They used to have fierce husband and wife domestic arguments." Joan Vidal, a friend of the sculptor Edward Harris, who was commissioned by Hubbard to create a bust of him, described Mary Sue as "a rather drab, mousy, nothing sort of person, quite a bit younger than him." Ken Urquhart, who worked for the Hubbards as their butler in the 1960s, commented that Mary Sue "could be very sweet and loving, but also very cold." Cyril Vosper, one of the Saint Hill staff at the time, noted the differing impressions left by the Hubbards: "I always had great warmth and admiration for Ron – he was a remarkable individual, a constant source of new information and ideas – but I thought Mary Sue was an exceedingly nasty person. She was a bitch."

Mary Sue became pregnant again four months after Quentin's birth, and on February 13, 1955, in Washington, D.C., she gave birth to her second daughter, Mary Suzette Rochelle Hubbard. Following the birth, the Hubbards moved into a house in Silver Spring, Maryland. A Founding Church of Scientology was established in Washington, D.C., and Mary Sue became its first Academy Supervisor.

The Hubbards returned again to London at the end of September 1955, where they took over the day-to-day management of the Hubbard Association of Scientologists International. They remained there until 1957, when Hubbard returned to lecture at the Academy of Scientology in Washington, D.C., with Mary Sue and the children following later. By this time Mary Sue was pregnant for a fourth time and gave birth to her final child, Arthur Ronald Conway Hubbard, on June 6, 1958.

A change in the visa regime in the UK enabled foreigners to remain indefinitely if they had sufficient means to support themselves. The Hubbards moved back to London in February 1959, settling for a while in Golders Green. Not long afterwards Hubbard bought Saint Hill Manor at Saint Hill Green, near East Grinstead, West Sussex. The manor, a country house formerly owned by Sawai Man Singh II, the Maharajah of Jaipur, became both the new home of the Hubbards and the world headquarters of Scientology.

The Hubbards continued to carry out auditing of each other, and in February 1960 Mary Sue wrote to a friend to inform her that her husband had discovered that she had been the writer D.H. Lawrence in a past life. She intended to make use of this discovery by writing a book that would be "completely anti-Christ". The protagonist, "a bastard child", would be the son of the three most virile men in the town (a satire of the Holy Trinity). The mother had slept with all three men on the same night but as she did not know which had fathered the child, had "thereupon decided to call him Ali, son of ----, son of ----, and son of ---- which impressed the local inhabitants and created a stir throughout the country."

By this time, Mary Sue was working as the chief course supervisor at Saint Hill Manor. The Hubbards' relationship was unconventional, as their butler, Ken Urquhart, later recalled: "Neither Ron nor Mary Sue lived the way one might have expected in a house like that. They spent most of their time working; there was very little socializing. They would go to bed very late, usually in the small hours of the morning, and get up in the early afternoon ... [Mary Sue] had a separate bedroom, but usually had breakfast with him – scrambled eggs, sausages, mushrooms and tomatoes. After breakfast he would go into his office and I would rarely see him again until six-thirty when I had to have the table laid for dinner. At six-twenty-five I would go into his office with a jacket for him to wear to table and after dinner they would spend an hour or so watching television with the children and then he and Mary Sue would return to work in their separate offices."

On January 26, 1967, Mary Sue was confirmed as a Scientology "Clear", a somewhat elite rank at that time. Her achievement was commemorated in a special tribute edition of the Scientology newspaper The Auditor, titled simply: "Mary Sue Hubbard – Clear #208". In it, she thanked her husband "for having given the most precious gifts of freedom and true beingness to me and my fellow man. Without him, none of this would have been possible; and so to Ron goes my everlasting gratitude for having provided for all of us the road to Clear."

== Life at sea ==
During the late 1960s, Scientology was faced by an increasingly hostile media and intensifying government scrutiny in a number of countries, notably Australia, New Zealand, South Africa, the United Kingdom, and the United States. Hubbard decided to take to the high seas in a bid to liberate Scientology from the attentions of hostile governments. On November 22, 1966, the Hubbard Explorational Company Limited was formed with Hubbard and Mary Sue as directors – Hubbard being described as expedition supervisor and Mary Sue as company secretary. Several ships were purchased to serve as the quarters of the newly created "Sea Org". The flagship of the Scientology fleet was the 3,280-ton vessel HMS Royal Scotsman – accidentally renamed the Royal Scotman due to a clerical error, a former cattle ferry on the Irish Sea run.

After the vessel had been renovated by Scientologists, Mary Sue and the children moved into the upper-deck accommodation in November 1968. The difference in the quality of living conditions between the Hubbards and the crew was stark:

Most of the crew lived in cramped, smelly, roach-infested dormitories fitted with bunks in three tiers that left little room for personal possessions. Hubbard and Mary Sue each had their own state-rooms in addition to a suite on the promenade deck comprising an auditing-room, office, an elegant saloon and a wood-paneled dining-room, all off-limits to students and crew. Hubbard had a personal steward, as did Mary Sue and the Hubbard children, who all had their own cabins. Meals for the Commodore and his family were cooked in a separate galley by their personal chef, using ingredients brought by couriers from the United States.

In April 1969, Mary Sue was promoted by Hubbard to serve as the captain of the Royal Scotman and ordered to cruise up and down the coast of Spain to train the vessel's inexperienced crew of Scientologists, who had made a string of mistakes that infuriated Hubbard. The trip had the air of a punishment detail and was dubbed the "liability cruise"; conditions on board were reportedly appalling. According to Russell Miller, "The crew worked to the point of exhaustion, the food was meager and no one was allowed to wash or change their clothes. Mary Sue enforced the rules rigidly but shared the privations, and was scrupulously fair and popular." The entire crew was forced to wear gray rags to symbolize their demotion; it was said that even Mary Sue's corgi dog, Vixie, had a gray rag tied around her neck. The "liability cruise" ended in June 1969. The Royal Scotman was later renamed the Apollo.

Apart from captaining the Royal Scotman for a period, Mary Sue's duties included managing the sprawling empire of the Guardian's Office agency within the Church of Scientology and serving as the chair of an executive group known variously as the Commodore's Staff Aides, the Aides Council, and the International Board of Scientology Organizations. This body was responsible for overseeing each of the seven organizational subdivisions of the Church of Scientology. She played a central role in the financial management of the Church of Scientology's two principal corporations, the Church of Scientology of California and the United Kingdom Church of Scientology. She was a sole signatory to the Church of Scientology's trust accounts and was also a director of the Operation Transport Corporation (OTC), a company established in 1968 that served as a conduit for cash transfers from the Church of Scientology to L. Ron Hubbard personally; it was characterized by US Tax Court as a "sham corporation" whose role was the enrichment of the Hubbards. She personally handled large quantities of cash on Hubbard's behalf. In the summer of 1972, Hubbard ordered that around $2 million in cash be transferred from OTC bank accounts in Switzerland to the Apollo, where it was stored for the next three years in a locked file cabinet to which Mary Sue Hubbard had the only set of keys. Her salary was relatively modest, amounting to $30,430 ($150,732 in 2007 prices) between 1970 and 1972, though she did also benefit from tens of thousands of dollars a year in living expenses paid for by the Church of Scientology.

The Hubbards moved ashore in March 1972 after three years traveling aboard their ship from port to port in the Mediterranean. They set up home in a villa on the outskirts of the Moroccan city of Tangier. Their sojourn in Morocco ended abruptly in December 1972 when it became clear that the Church of Scientology was about to be indicted in France for fraud, and that Hubbard himself was potentially at risk of being extradited to appear in court if the case went to trial. Hubbard returned to the United States, living under a false name in New York City while Mary Sue and the children remained aboard the Apollo. They were reunited in September 1973, when the possibility of extradition had passed. When it became known in October 1974 that the FBI wished to interview Hubbard, Mary Sue persuaded her husband to avoid going ashore in the United States and the Apollo spent the next year sailing from port to port in the Caribbean.

The Scientology fleet was finally disbanded in 1975, when Hubbard decided to move ashore and establish a "land base" in Florida. He and Mary Sue moved initially to Daytona Beach, Florida, in August 1975. They lived there incognito for a few months before moving into an apartment in Dunedin on the west coast of Florida, a few miles north of the town of Clearwater where a Scientology front company had bought the old Fort Harrison Hotel to serve as Scientology's new headquarters. The presence of the Hubbards was meant to be a secret, but in January 1976 he was recognized by a science fiction fan while on a shopping trip. Fearing arrest, he fled to Washington, D.C., with a handful of aides while Mary Sue was left behind in Florida continuing her day-to-day management activities.

In October 1976, Hubbard's eldest son by Mary Sue, Quentin, died by suicide at the age of 22. Mary Sue was grief-stricken, though she later attempted to persuade friends that Quentin had died from encephalitis. Her husband's reaction was one of fury, blaming Quentin for – in his eyes – letting him down.

== The Guardian's Office scandal ==
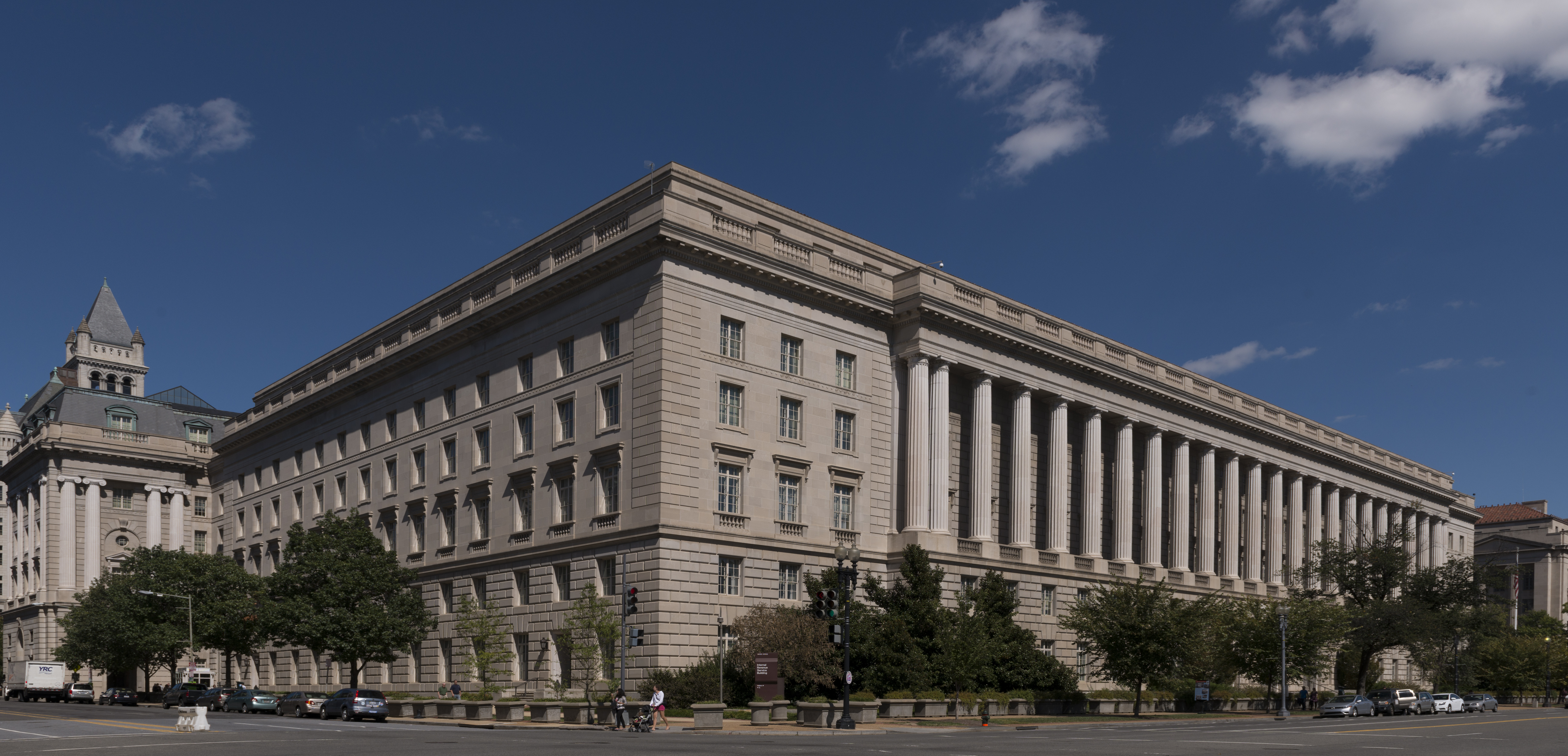
The IRS building on Constitution Avenue, Washington D.C., was infiltrated, bugged, and burglarized on Mary Sue Hubbard's orders.

On July 8, 1977, 134 agents of the Federal Bureau of Investigation simultaneously stormed the Church of Scientology's offices in Washington, D.C. and Los Angeles, seizing nearly 50,000 documents and other evidence. The raids were in response to the federal government's discovery that the Church of Scientology had been carrying out a secret and highly illegal "dirty tricks" campaign against government agencies, individuals, and institutions deemed to be enemies of Scientology. A year later, on August 15, 1978, Mary Sue Hubbard was indicted by a grand jury, accused of masterminding a conspiracy against the government in her capacity as head of the Church's Guardian's Office.

Mary Sue was appointed by her husband as Guardian (later Controller) of the Guardian's Office (GO) in March 1966. Established in response to the battering that Scientology was receiving at the time from governments and the media, the GO was tasked with tackling any "threat of great importance" to Scientology. This work took a variety of forms, including public relations, legal actions, and the gathering of "intelligence" on perceived enemies. In the UK alone, it issued hundreds of writs against the media for publishing negative reports on Scientology. It carried out an international campaign against psychiatry, Interpol, the US Internal Revenue Service (IRS) and various other government agencies. Its eventual downfall was to result from the use of illegal methods, ordered and authorized by Mary Sue, to further its campaign.

Mary Sue was promoted to the position of Controller "for life" of the Guardian's Office in January 1969, with one of her subordinates, Jane Kember, being appointed to Mary Sue's old post of Guardian. Mary Sue continued to manage the GO from her various residences aboard the Apollo, and the villa in Tangier. At the order of both of the Hubbards, the GO ran scores of operations against Scientology's enemies. The targets were not just external enemies but dissident Scientologists; in 1969, Mary Sue wrote an order directing the GO to cull information from the confessional folders of Scientologists, breaking a rule of confidence that was supposedly sacrosanct. L. Ron Hubbard was said to have been fully aware of the GO's actions; the US government would later declare him to be an "unindicted co-conspirator" in the GO's illegal activities.

One of their primary targets was the IRS, with which Scientology was engaged in a bitter battle over tax exemptions. As part of a wider strategy codenamed Operation Snow White, the GO succeeded in infiltrating a Scientologist into the IRS to steal files about the government's litigation strategy against Scientology. Mary Sue was closely involved in the strategy; a letter written by her, approving the thefts, was later used in evidence against her. In March 1976, she approved an illegal plan to obtain "non-FOI data" from the government, meaning classified documents not available through the Freedom of Information Act. The GO's agent in the IRS, Michael Meisner, was ordered to obtain all files concerning L. Ron and Mary Sue Hubbard from the IRS Office of International Operations, which he succeeded in infiltrating.

The espionage continued for another three months before Meisner's luck ran out and he was caught in June 1976. Although he bluffed it out initially, a warrant was issued for his arrest in August. The situation was potentially disastrous for the GO and caused panic among the leadership. Mary Sue conspired with her subordinates to concoct alibis for Meisner and work out how to keep him out of the hands of the authorities, keeping him in hiding under a series of false identities. Meisner became increasingly reluctant to cooperate with his GO handlers and in April 1977 he was forcibly taken by GO staff to a new hiding place. He succeeded in escaping in May and turned himself in to the FBI, making a full confession. The raids of July 1977 were the result.

The case eventually came to trial in September 1979, following months of delay occasioned by a fierce rear-guard action by the Church of Scientology's lawyers. On October 8, a deal was struck between the government and the Church that the nine defendants – including Mary Sue – would each plead guilty to one charge of conspiracy if they agreed to sign a written stipulation by the government (essentially a public confession) of what they had done, thus avoiding a lengthy trial. They were formally found guilty on October 26, 1979. Mary Sue and two others received the heaviest penalties, a five-year prison sentence and a $10,000 fine. The other five defendants received lesser sentences and fines. Her husband avoided being indicted but was extremely concerned that Mary Sue would betray him. One of his aides, David Mayo, was dispatched by Hubbard to suggest that Mary Sue might consider a divorce. According to Mayo:

She was really offended and very upset. I thought she was going to blow my head off. I went back several times later to make sure that she wasn't going to rat on him. That's what he was really worried about, that she would reveal during the case that she was only relaying his orders. She had covered up for him so much, and there had been so many opportunities for her to betray him, that she couldn't believe he would think that. She kept saying to me, 'What is he worried about?' I thought to myself, 'My God, I can't tell her.'"

== Downfall ==
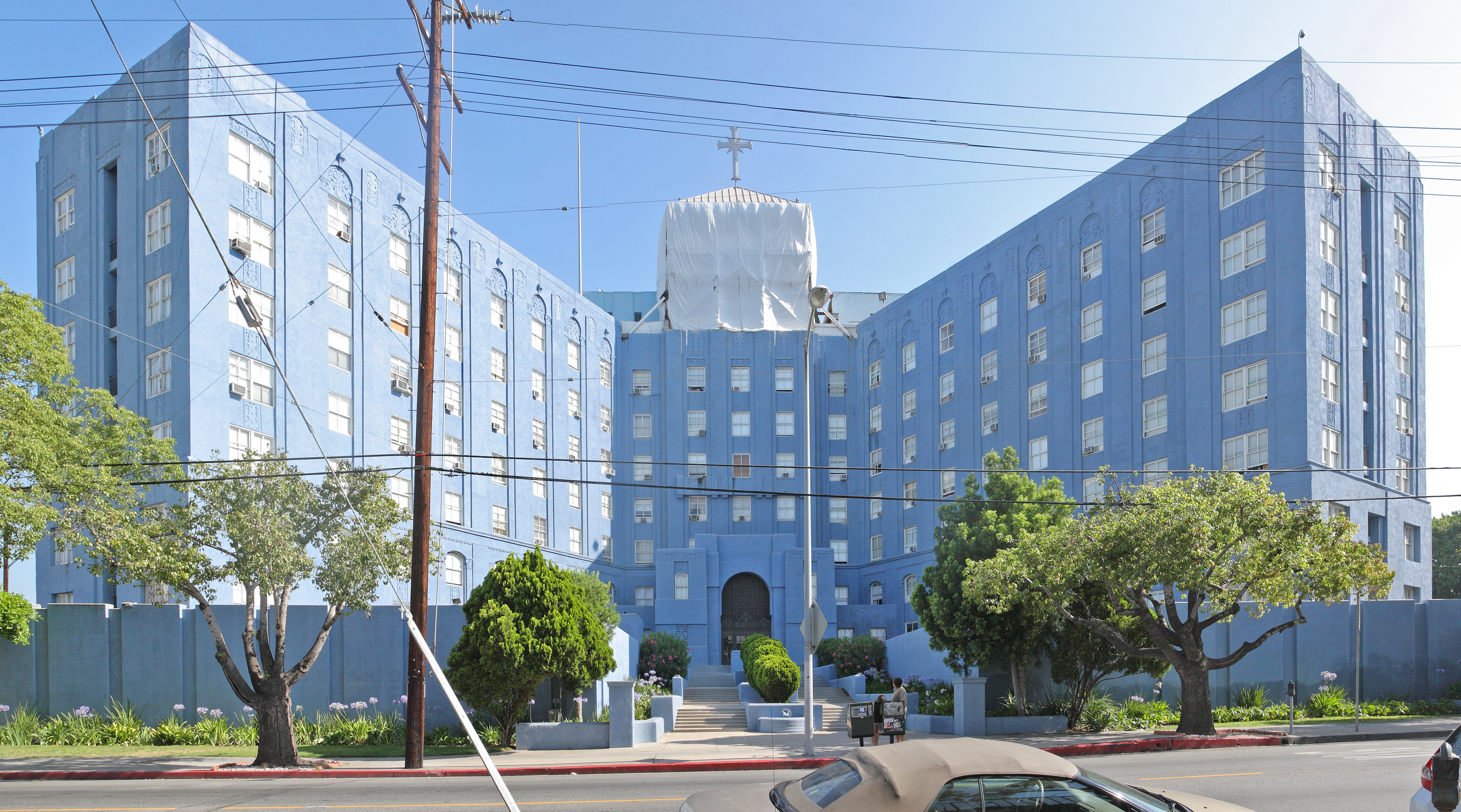
The former Cedars of Lebanon hospital complex in Los Angeles, where the Guardian's Office was based

Despite her conviction, Mary Sue remained in her post as Controller of the Guardian's Office (GO). There was no shortage of work for her to do; further legal difficulties were anticipated, as there was a New York grand jury investigating Operation Freakout, the GO's campaign against New York author Paulette Cooper, and a Florida grand jury looking into Scientology's activities in Clearwater. Around the end of February 1980, Ron Hubbard went into hiding and remained in seclusion at the Scientology property Creston Ranch in central California, for the remaining six years of his life. Mary Sue, who had last met with her husband a few months before his disappearance, never saw or heard from him again.

Hubbard nonetheless remained active in the management of Scientology. The criminal conviction of the GO's top executives triggered a lengthy power struggle at the top of the Church of Scientology, which would lead eventually to Mary Sue being forced into retirement. Under his doctrine he believed that "mistakes do not just happen, somebody causes them, always". A disaster on the scale of the GO criminal case was clearly the result of the activities of someone hostile to Scientology – a suppressive person – operating within the GO. He issued an internal directive in 1979 asserting that major failures must result from the presence of multiple Suppressives, who would need to be rooted out along with their "connections". The downfall of the GO led Hubbard to distrust it, believing it to be riddled with Suppressives; he severed his communications with it and put his reliance instead on the Commodore's Messenger Organization (CMO), a group he had formed in 1968 and whose purpose was to relay messages to and from church staff as Ron's personal representatives. The Messengers, who were mostly in their teens and early twenties, became Hubbard's sole means of communication with the Church.

In 1981, the "All Clear Unit" was established within the CMO, tasked with the purpose of making it "All Clear" for Hubbard to come out of hiding. One of its principal figures was David Miscavige, a 21-year-old Messenger who had worked as a cameraman for Hubbard. In May 1981, he met with Mary Sue to tell her that her position as Controller of the Guardian's Office was untenable. She reacted angrily; in a 1992 trial in Canada, Miscavige told the court that she had called him "some pretty nasty names" and threatened him with a large ashtray held close to his face, but she had eventually agreed to step down. She subsequently changed her mind, believing that she had been tricked, and wrote to her husband to complain but received no response. Numerous other Guardian's Office personnel were purged as well.

In July 1981, all remaining GO staff were ordered to join the Sea Org, which would thus secure the CMO's control of the Guardian's Office, and the current Guardian, Jane Kember – who was one of those convicted on conspiracy charges – was to be removed. Mary Sue strongly opposed these changes and reappointed herself Controller, rescinding the CMO's permission to investigate the GO. CMO staff investigating the GO were physically expelled from the Church of Scientology's Los Angeles headquarters, and the Controller's files were guarded day and night. Mary Sue attempted to contact her husband to rescind the CMO's takeover bid but failed, and admitted defeat when the Messengers produced an undated dispatch from Hubbard instructing the GO to be put under the CMO when its senior executives went to prison. She stood down again, being replaced by a South African Scientologist named Gordon Cook, and Jane Kember was replaced by David Gaiman, a British Scientologist.

Miscavige provided a first-hand account of these events, in an affidavit submitted in a case heard in 1994 in California, Church of Scientology International vs. Steven Fishman and Uwe Geertz. He stated:

In 1981, a Church investigation was begun into the activities of the GO. That investigation was prompted by the existence of a number of civil law suits which had been filed at that time against Church of Scientology of California and Mr. Hubbard, and which the GO was supposed to be responsible for handling. Not only was the GO not handling these suits, the GO, and particularly Mary Sue Hubbard, even refused to answer our questions about the suits because they viewed themselves answerable only to persons within the GO ...

Our attempts to get information were thwarted by Mary Sue Hubbard. She informed us that she did not appreciate our investigation of the GO and that if one were needed she would do it. In March 1981 she cut all of our communication lines to the GO, except through herself. It must be noted that Mary Sue Hubbard believed her position as Controller and as the "Founder's wife" to be unassailable and beyond reproach by anyone but Mr. Hubbard – who was not around at the time, a fact that she was well aware of. This, plus her absolute control of the GO, made it difficult for the Church missionaires [Sea Org staff dispatched to achieve a target or specific goal] to get anything done.

[It] was made clear that we had no choice but to overthrow the GO and dismiss everyone who had violated Church policy or the law. These activities ultimately led to a complete disband of the GO. I gathered a couple of dozen of the most proven Church executives from around the world and briefed them on the criminal and other unethical conduct of the GO. Together, we planned a series of missions to take over the GO, investigate it and reform it thoroughly. On July 13, 1981, a matter of weeks after we had uncovered what was going on, and with no advance warning to the GO, a coordinated series of CMO missions were sent out concurrently to take over the GO. However, there were a number of obstacles to overcome before the termination of the GO could be accomplished. Mary Sue Hubbard was still asserting her authority over the GO from her position as Controller.

Mary Sue Hubbard was removed from her post before she went to jail. I know, because I personally met with her and obtained her resignation ... At first, Mary Sue Hubbard was not willing to resign. Eventually she did so. Mary Sue Hubbard and the GO, however, did not simply capitulate. Within a day of Mary Sue Hubbard's resignation, senior GO officials secretly met with Mary Sue Hubbard and conspired to regain control of the GO. Mary Sue Hubbard signed a letter revoking her resignation and condemning the actions of the CMO. Scores of GO staff responded, locking the missionaires out of their premises and were intending to hire armed guards to bar access by me and the other Church officials who had ousted them. I then confronted the mutineers, and persuaded Mary Sue Hubbard to again resign, which ended the last vestige of GO resistance.

Speaking several years later to the St. Petersburg Times newspaper, Miscavige commented:

I knew if it was going to be a physical takeover we're going to lose because they had a couple thousand staff and we (the "messengers") had about 50. That is the amazing part about it.

According to the Church of Scientology, Hubbard himself did not find out about Mary Sue's resignation until five months later.

The convictions of Mary Sue Hubbard and the other GO staff executives were upheld by a federal appeals court in October 1981, and in November seven of those convicted dropped their appeals – but not Mary Sue, who continued to fight the charges. She lost her final appeal in April 1982 and was ordered to begin a prison term in January 1983. The original sentence of five years imprisonment was not carried out, and the court ordered a study of her claimed medical problems, before eventually replacing her sentence with a four-year term of imprisonment, with parole set at 40 months. She was sent to the federal prison in Lexington, Kentucky, to serve her sentence, though in the end, she was released after only a year of imprisonment.

== Life after the Guardian's Office ==
After her resignation from the GO, Mary Sue Hubbard ceased to have any involvement in the management of the Church of Scientology. She did, however, resurface on a few occasions during the remaining years of her life. In 1984 she acted as an "intervenor" in the Church of Scientology of California's lawsuit against Gerry Armstrong. He had worked as an archivist for the Church of Scientology, gathering source material for a planned biography of L. Ron Hubbard. He became disillusioned with Scientology and left the Church, taking with him copies of biographical material, including Hubbard's letters to Mary Sue over the years. The Church sued in 1982 and Mary Sue joined the suit, charging that Armstrong had committed an "invasion of privacy". When the case came to trial in May 1984, she told the Superior Court of Los Angeles County that she had been "mentally raped" and "emotionally distressed" knowing that others had seen the documents. She told the court that she had not seen her husband since January 1980, "but I've written him personal letters ... but I don't believe he's getting them" as he had not replied to them. In June 1984, Judge Paul G. Breckenridge ruled against the Church and Mary Sue Hubbard, criticizing her credibility as a witness:

LRH's wife, Mary Sue Hubbard is also plaintiff herein. On the one hand she certainly appeared to be a pathetic individual. She was forced from her post as controller, convicted and imprisoned as a felon, and deserted by her husband. On the other hand her credibility leaves much to be desired. She struck the familiar pose of not seeing, hearing or knowing any evil. Yet she was the head of the Guardian Office for years and among other things, authored the infamous order "GO 121669" which directed culling of supposedly confidential P.C. files/folders for purposes of internal security ... It is, of course, rather ironic that the person who authorized G.O. 121669 should complain about invasion of privacy. The practice of culling supposedly confidential "P.C. folders or files" to obtain information for purposes of intimidation and or harassment is repugnant. The Guardian Office was no respector of anyone's civil rights, particularly that of privacy.

A month later, in the English High Court of Justice, Mr Justice Latey declared in a case in which Scientology was a prominent issue that "Mr Hubbard is a charlatan and worse, as are his wife, Mary Sue Hubbard, and the clique at the top privy to the cult's activities."

In October 1984, Mary Sue filed a $5 million lawsuit against her husband's first son, Ronald DeWolf, accusing him of "massive fraud" for attempting to have his father declared legally dead or mentally incompetent. L. Ron Hubbard died on January 24, 1986, at his ranch near Creston, California.

A Scientology spokesman informed the press that she had been left "a very generous provision" in her husband's will, though the details were kept secret. Mary Sue Hubbard continued to be active in Scientology well into the 1990s; in a 1994 Scientology magazine, she was listed as a "Patron" of the International Association of Scientologists, indicating a donation of $40,000. In December 1995, Hubbard had a mastectomy of her left breast. In 1998 she was diagnosed with metastatic breast cancer in addition to her existing chronic obstructive pulmonary disease (COPD). Mary Sue Hubbard died on November 25, 2002, aged 71, at her home in Los Angeles. Her body was cremated two days later and her ashes were scattered at sea off the California coast, where L. Ron Hubbard's ashes had similarly been scattered in January 1986.

== Family tree ==
L. Ron Hubbard family tree

Ledora May Waterbury	Harry Ross Hubbard
L. Ron Hubbard
Margaret Grubb	Sara Northrup Hollister	Mary Sue Whipp
L. Ron Hubbard Jr.	Katherine; May	Alexis; Valerie	Diana Hubbard	Quentin Hubbard	Mary Suzette Hubbard	Arthur Hubbard
Deborah DeWolf Kennedy
Jamie DeWolf

== See also ==
- United States v. Hubbard
