= Quentin Hubbard =

American scientologist (1954–1976)

- Born: Geoffrey Quentin McCaully Hubbard; January 6, 1954; United States
- Died: November 12, 1976 (aged 22); Las Vegas, Nevada, United States
- Parents: L. Ron Hubbard; Mary Sue Hubbard
- Relatives: L Ron Hubbard Jr. (half-brother)

Geoffrey Quentin McCaully Hubbard (January 6, 1954 – November 12, 1976), was the son of Scientology founder L. Ron Hubbard and his third wife, Mary Sue Hubbard. He died at the age of 22 in an apparent suicide.

After Ron's eldest son Ron Jr. quit Scientology in 1959, Ron chose Quentin as his successor to lead the organization. Quentin went to sea with Ron when he established the Sea Organization, living on the flagship Apollo and reaching the highest level of auditor training. He disagreed with his father's plans, sometimes saying that he wanted to be a pilot, and in 1974 that he would like to be a dancer. Soon after this, a friend found him in the midst of a suicide attempt. Quentin survived this attempt and was assigned to the Rehabilitation Project Force.

Former Scientologists have said that Quentin was homosexual, and that this clearly caused him a great deal of personal torment as Scientology doctrine classified homosexuals as "sexual pervert[s]" and "quite ill physically." Another source close to him claims that rumors of his homosexuality were due to his sometimes claiming to be that way in order to discourage women who were interested in him, to protect them from the consequences of his father's disapproval. Quentin is described as having had a gentle demeanor, with none of his father's bombast.

In 1975, the Sea Org moved to shore in Clearwater, Florida. Quentin was assigned to operations there but was often absent. Police discovered him unconscious in his car in Las Vegas on October 28, 1976, without any identifying documents. L. Ron Hubbard was furious at the news, shouting, "That stupid fucking kid! Look what he's done to me!" Quentin died two weeks later without having regained consciousness.

Although a hose connected to the tailpipe was found in the car's window, a test for carbon monoxide was negative. Mary Sue Hubbard told Scientologists that Quentin had died from encephalitis. L. Ron Hubbard is said to have deteriorated rapidly after Quentin's death, becoming dishevelled and increasingly paranoid.

== Family tree ==
L. Ron Hubbard family tree

Ledora May Waterbury	Harry Ross Hubbard
L. Ron Hubbard
Margaret Grubb	Sara Northrup Hollister	Mary Sue Whipp
L. Ron Hubbard Jr.	Katherine; May	Alexis; Valerie	Diana Hubbard	Quentin Hubbard	Mary Suzette Hubbard	Arthur Hubbard
Deborah DeWolf Kennedy
Jamie DeWolf
