= Ronald DeWolf =

American critic of Scientology (1934–1991)

- DeWolf during an interview in 1983
- Born: Lafayette Ronald Hubbard, Jr. May 7, 1934; Encinitas, California, U.S.
- Died: September 16, 1991 (aged 57); Carson City, Nevada, U.S.
- Other name: "Nibs" Hubbard
- Notable work: L. Ron Hubbard: Messiah or Madman?, co-author
- Parents: L. Ron Hubbard (father); Margaret Grubb (mother)
- Relatives: Quentin Hubbard (half-brother); Jamie DeWolf (grandson)

Ronald Edward DeWolf (born Lafayette Ronald Hubbard Jr.; May 7, 1934 – September 16, 1991), also known as "Nibs" Hubbard, was the eldest child of Scientology's founder L. Ron Hubbard by his first wife Margaret Louise Grubb. He was highly critical of his father and of the Church of Scientology. In his opinion, Scientology was a cult that existed to make money.

== Early life ==
In his 1983 interview with Penthouse magazine, DeWolf said he was born prematurely at 2 pounds 2 ounces (0.96 kg) after surviving an early abortion attempt. His father constructed a makeshift incubator with a shoe box, later a cupboard drawer, and used blankets and an electric light bulb to keep the baby warm.

== Relationship with Hubbard and Scientology ==
Hubbard, Jr. claimed to have helped his father in the early days of Scientology but later rejected his father and Scientology, quitting Scientology in 1959 and changing his name to Ronald DeWolf in 1972. On November 6, 1982, in a Riverside, California court, DeWolf sued for control of his father's estate, saying that his father was either deceased or incompetent. His reclusive father was proven to still be alive, although he never appeared in court.

=== Comments about his father ===
External videos
- Ronald DeWolf testimony Day 1 and Day 2
- Ronald DeWolf interview (1983)
- Ronald DeWolf interviewed by Carol Randolph
- Jamie DeWolf reads grandfather's memoir

In 1981, DeWolf wrote his autobiography The Telling of Me, by Me, which he never published.

After detailing how his father taught him the occult, he comments:

What the hell is Dianetics and Scientology? It's a religion. A religion of self. It's one man's religion. One man's labyrinth. A trip of L. Ron Hubbard's. A trip he lays on everyone else as 'the trip,' their trip, your trip. A science fiction story he wrote and forced into reality within the heads of others by the will of L. Ron Hubbard. The self-created fantasy of one man brought to deadly reality for others by a simple word: agreement.

In the mid-1980s, DeWolf gave several interviews and made sworn statements about his father's history. He explained that his father had been "deeply involved in the occult and black magic." Aleister Crowley's death in 1947 was a pivotal event that led Hubbard to "take over the mantle of the Beast". "Black magic is the inner core of Scientology", DeWolf said. "My father did not worship Satan. He thought he was Satan."

"99% of what my father ever wrote or said about himself is totally untrue", DeWolf said in a TV interview in 1983. That same year, he told Penthouse magazine that his father was a KGB asset and a drug addict who claimed to be Satan incarnate. According to DeWolf, his father was so close to embattled actor Errol Flynn that Hubbard regarded Flynn as DeWolf's adoptive father, and that together Hubbard and Flynn engaged in such illegal activities as drug smuggling and statutory rape. Speaking on WDVM in Washington, DC, in 1983, on the Carol Randolph Morning Break show, he compared Sea Org with the Nazi SS, and described drug importation operations he alleged his father had been involved in, citing organised crime connections in Mexico and Colombia.

=== Sued by Mary Sue Hubbard ===
In 1984, his stepmother Mary Sue Hubbard filed a $5-million suit for fraud against DeWolf for his 1982 suit to gain control of L. Ron Hubbard's estate.

=== Biography of L. Ron Hubbard ===
DeWolf was named as co-author with Bent Corydon of the 1987 edition of a highly critical book about Hubbard and the Church of Scientology titled L. Ron Hubbard, Messiah or Madman?. Prior to publication, he sued the publisher Lyle Stuart, claiming breach of contract, and that his contributions were misrepresented. He retracted his negative comments about Hubbard and the church in submitted court affidavits, in which he called the biography "inaccurate and false", and demanded to have his name removed from the book. He said he was denied the opportunity to review the book until it was already in print.

In A Piece of Blue Sky former Scientologist Jon Atack writes:

Nibs accepted a financial settlement from the Scientologists after his father's death in 1986, agreeing not to make further comment.

In the updated revision of L. Ron Hubbard: Messiah or Madman?, which no longer listed DeWolf as co-author, Corydon comments:

In the case of L. Ron Hubbard Jr.'s 1986 "legal settlement" with Scientology, he had accumulated sizable hospital bills due to recent emergency surgery. This left him weakened and heavily in debt. Concerned about the welfare of his family he finally agreed to a "settlement". This included his signing various prepared documents. I don't believe for a moment that Ron Jr. ever considered these prepared statements to be accurate representations of his thoughts and beliefs. The man was under duress.

Claims that DeWolf was paid for his statements have not been proven or refuted.

== Death ==
DeWolf died of diabetes complications in 1991. He was working as a security guard at the Ormsby House Hotel Casino in Carson City, Nevada, at the time of his death.

== Family tree ==
L. Ron Hubbard family tree

Ledora May Waterbury | Harry Ross Hubbard
L. Ron Hubbard
Margaret Grubb | Sara Northrup Hollister | Mary Sue Whipp
L. Ron Hubbard Jr. | Katherine; May | Alexis; Valerie | Diana Hubbard | Quentin Hubbard | Mary Suzette Hubbard | Arthur Hubbard
Deborah DeWolf Kennedy
Jamie DeWolf

== See also ==
- Clearwater Hearings
- Paulette Cooper
- Quentin Hubbard
- Scientology and the occult
