= Commodore's Messenger Organization =

Scientology organization

- Formation: 1969
- Type: Unit in the Sea Org, the paramilitary wing of the Church of Scientology
- Headquarters: Hemet, California, United States
- Chairman of Religious Technology Center: David Miscavige

The Commodore's Messenger Organization (CMO) is a management unit within the Sea Org, the unincorporated paramilitary wing of the Church of Scientology. CMO oversees the various other Church of Scientology organizations.

== Formation ==
The first Commodore's Messengers were appointed by L. Ron Hubbard in 1968 while he was living aboard the Sea Org's ship Apollo. These messengers were his personal administrative assistants and operated solely under his direction, ensuring that Scientology management was following Hubbard's policies.

The original four messengers were sisters Janis Gillham (aged 11) and Terri Gillham (12), Annie Tidman (12), and Hubbard's youngest daughter Suzette Hubbard (13). In 1975 while sailing in the Caribbean, due to the heat and humidity, the Messengers devised their uniforms themselves: white shorts, tie tops and platform shoes with knee high socks. Messengers conveyed messages from Hubbard and they were trained to mimic Hubbard's exact tone and mannerisms. According to messenger Tonja Burden, CMO recruits were required to practice specific training routines to attain this skill: "During the Training Routines, myself and two others practiced carrying messages to LRH. We had to listen to a message, repeat it in the same tone, and practice salutes."

Sea Org member Doreen Smith recalled a conversation she had with Hubbard concerning the origins of the CMO and why he had focused on young girls to carry out his personal tasks and deliver his executive orders:

I once asked him why he chose young girls as messengers ... He said it was an idea he had picked up from Nazi Germany. He said Hitler was a madman, but nevertheless a genius in his own right and the Nazi Youth was one of the smartest ideas he ever had. With young people you had a blank slate and you could write anything you wanted on it and it would be your writing. That was his idea, to take young people and mould them into little Hubbards. He said he had girls because women were more loyal than men.

— Doreen Smith

== Watchdog Committee ==
In 1979, the Watchdog Committee (WDC) was created out of senior executives of CMO.

Long the interface between Hubbard and the rest of the Church, part of the CMO became the senior management body: the Commodore's Messenger Organization International, or CMO Int. But as the Commodore's Messenger Organization was quite obviously connected to the Commodore, they had to find a new title. So the Watchdog Committee (WDC) came into being, in April 1979. It consisted solely of the senior executives of CMO Int. The function of WDC was to 'put senior management back on post.' They did this by absorbing all top management posts.

— Jon Atack in A Piece of Blue Sky

== All Clear Unit ==
In 1981, the All Clear Unit was set up at CMO Int with the purpose of ensuring an "All Clear" for Hubbard to emerge from hiding. As head of the unit, David Miscavige took orders only from Pat Broeker, who was accountable only to Hubbard.

== Notable staff ==
- Michelle Barnett (Shelly Miscavige) became a messenger at age 12. She later married fellow messenger and future Scientology leader David Miscavige. She has made no public appearances since August 2007. The Church of Scientology and the Los Angeles Police Department deny that she is missing.
- Pat Broeker was aboard the Apollo and, along with his wife Anne, were taking care of Hubbard at the time of his death. An order was issued promoting Broeker and his wife to the rank of "Loyal Officer", but that order was later cancelled.
- Janis Gillham, age 11, joined the Sea Organization in January 1968. She regularly attended to Hubbard for the next 11 years, until he went into hiding in 1979. In 2017, she authored Commodore's Messenger: A Child Adrift in the Scientology Sea Organization, and in 2018 Commodore's Messenger Book II: Riding Out The Storms With L. Ron Hubbard.
- Terri Gillham later became the executive director of Author Services Inc. and worked closely with David Miscavige.
- Suzette Hubbard, L. Ron Hubbard's youngest daughter, was briefly in the CMO at the age of 13. When she was replaced she went to work on the decks.
- David Miscavige joined the Messengers in 1977 at age 16. After Hubbard's death in 1986, Miscavige assumed the position of head of the Church of Scientology as well as ecclesiastical leader of the Scientology religion. Miscavige holds the rank of captain of the Sea Organization, and is its highest-ranking member.
- Mike Rinder joined the Sea Org at age 18 and worked under Hubbard on the Apollo ship in 1973. He joined the CMO in 1978, later becoming the Church's international spokesperson. Rinder left the Church in 2007, later becoming a prominent critic until his death in 2025.
- Sharone Stainforth, joined the Sea Org in 1967 at age 10, and became one of Hubbard's original messengers on the Apollo. After leaving Scientology, she became a critic of the organization.
- Annie Tidman (also known as Annie Broeker) became a messenger at age 12. She married fellow messenger Pat Broeker and they were among the few people in direct contact with L. Ron Hubbard during his final years. In November 1992, Tidman made an unannounced departure from the group, but returned after Marty Rathbun, then a high ranking member of the Sea Org, intercepted her at the Boston airport. She died in 2011.
- Marc Yager joined the Sea Org in 1974 as a teenager and sailed with Hubbard on Apollo. Yager became a messenger and assisted Hubbard in video production. Yager was appointed Commanding Officer of the Commodore's Messenger Organization, Chairman of the Watchdog Committee, and later, Inspector General for Administration in the Religious Technology Center (RTC).
- Jenna Miscavige Hill joined the CMO at 12.

== See also ==
- A Piece of Blue Sky
- Bare-faced Messiah
