= LifeTimes =

Studio album by Diana Hubbard
- Released: 1979
- Recorded: 1979
- Genres: Jazz, Pop
- Length: 39:31
- Label: Waterhouse Records 8
- Producer: Jimmie Spheeris

LifeTimes is an album by Diana Hubbard, released in 1979 by Waterhouse Records 8. In addition to Diana Hubbard, the album includes musical contributions from Chick Corea, Stanley Clarke, John Goodsall, Michael Boddicker, and Patrick Moraz.

== Background ==
Diana Hubbard was born in London, the daughter of L. Ron Hubbard, the leader of Scientology, a new religious movement often characterized as a cult. She was born Diana Meredith DeWolf Hubbard on September 24, 1952, to L. Ron Hubbard and his third wife, Mary Sue Hubbard, their first child together She composed sonatas for piano at age 6. In her early years as a teenager, she lived at Scientology's United Kingdom headquarters, Saint Hill Manor, along with her brother, Quentin Hubbard. She attended the Royal Academy, where she took courses in ballet and music. At the age of 15, she left the Royal Academy, in order to serve within the Scientology organization and assist her father. During the bulk of her teenage years, she lived on her father's yacht, located in the Mediterranean. By age 16, she rose to the rank of Lieutenant Commander within the Sea Org, a Scientology managerial and paramilitary organization. She became a spokesperson for the Church of Scientology within the United States in 1969. In 1979, Hubbard lived with her husband, audiophile Jonathan Horwich and her daughter Roanne, in Clearwater, Florida. In 1980, she served as an executive within the Church of Scientology, and as of 2001 she maintained a leadership position within the organization.

== Production ==
The album was produced by an independent label, Waterhouse Records 8. Waterhouse Records was based in Minnesota, and at the time of the album's release it was available by mail order from Minneapolis. It includes performances from musicians Chick Corea and Stanley Clarke – both Scientologists. Other noteworthy contributors include Patrick Moraz and Denny Seiwell. Musical artist Jimmie Spheeris persuaded Hubbard to record the album, and also served as its executive producer. The string portions were written by David Campbell.

Hubbard wrote all of the music for the album, with contributors utilizing instruments including synthesizers, bass, woodwinds, strings, and a bouzouki. She plays piano on the album. Most of the pieces on the album are of three to four minutes in duration. Wayne Isaak served as the Waterhouse Records publicist for the album. In publicity for the album, marketing compared Hubbard's musical writing style to that of Erik Satie. The album cover was marketed with a sticker on the outside wrapping advertising the fact that it was endorsed by Stanley Clarke.

== Reception ==
The album received poor critical reception. In a review of the album for The Harvard Crimson, Thomas M. Levenson wrote, "Hubbard's music does not, as a result, offend the listener. It's not execrable. It is just extraordinarily dull. As a pianist/composer, Hubbard sounds like Bruckner rewritten for the dentist's office." Don Lewis reviewed the album for The Milwaukee Journal, and commented, "It's peaceful, attractive music, even though, after a while, it sounds like many of Miss Hubbard's compositions are swatches from the same bolt of cloth."

Billboard highlighted the album in its column, "Billboard's Top Album Picks", in the section "First Time Around". Billboard described the album as "a light classics pop LP" and noted, "The music is mostly soft and pretty drawing from many ethnic sources." The Sarasota Herald-Tribune described the album as "an instrumental with a medieval quality in the all-encompassing and sometimes mysterious sound of strings, piano and rhythm section. The repetitive phrasing and rolling melody are synthesized tone and nuance." The St. Petersburg Times described Hubbard's piano compositions as "fresh, haunting melodies".

"Rose Coloured Lights" was issued as a single on Waterhouse 15003 and hit #40 on the Billboard Adult Contemporary chart in 1980.

== Track listing ==
LifeTimes

All music is composed by Diana Hubbard.

Side 1
No.	Title	Length
1.	"Rose Coloured Lights"	1:52
2.	"Morning"	1:40
3.	"Russian Roulette, 1st movement, 2nd movement"	4:54
4.	"Dream #23"	3:04
5.	"Bewitched"	2:40
6.	"Rainy Streets"	4:22

Side 2
No.	Title	Length
1.	"Dream #5"	2:32
2.	"Arabia"	3:05
3.	"Berlin 1945"	3:55
4.	"Desperation"	2:08
5.	"Medieval Heart"	4:30
6.	"Midnight #3"	4:08

== Personnel ==
Musicians

- Diana Hubbard – piano
- Chick Corea – synthesizers
- Michael Boddicker – synthesizers
- Stanley Clarke – string bass
- Patrick Moraz – synthesizer
- John Goodsall - guitars
- Ric Parnell - drums
- David Campbell – violas
- Jim Cowger – woodwinds
- Dennis Karmazyn – cello
- Al Hendrickson – bouzouki
- Denny Seiwell – drums
- Johnny Pierce – bass
