= South Colby, Washington =

Unincorporated community in Washington, United States

- Unincorporated community
- Location in Washington and the United States South Colby (the United States)
- Coordinates: 47°31′19″N 122°32′14″W
- Country: United States
- State: Washington
- County: Kitsap
- Time zone: UTC-8 (Pacific (PST))
  - Summer (DST): UTC-7 (PDT)
- GNIS feature ID: 1512674

South Colby is an unincorporated community in Kitsap County, Washington, United States. It is located on Yukon Harbor, 2 miles (3 km) west of the Southworth Ferry Dock. From there, a ferry is available to Fauntleroy in the West Seattle neighborhood of Seattle. South Colby is part of the Southworth census-designated place.

Colby is a shortening and alteration of "Coal Bay".
