= Epilepsy Foundation =

US non-profit organization

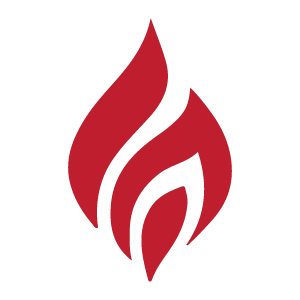
- The Epilepsy Foundation's previous logo from 2011
- Formation: 1968; 58 years ago
- Type: National organization, non-profit
- Legal status: 501(c)(3) organization
- Headquarters: Landover, Maryland, United States
- Region served: United States
- Founder: Warren Lammert
- Chief Executive Officer: Bernice Martin Lee
- Website: www.epilepsy.com
- Formerly called: Epilepsy Foundation of America

The Epilepsy Foundation (Note: Formerly the Epilepsy Foundation of America, and the Epilepsy Alliance) is an American non-profit national foundation, which is based in Landover, Maryland, it was established in 1968, with the goal to provide the welfare of people with epilepsy, and seizure disorders. The foundation and its 59 affiliates, provide assistance in counseling, and in healthcare. Programs include educational, counseling, referral, and employment assistance.

The Epilepsy Foundation came into existence from the result of a merger of the Epilepsy Association of America and the Epilepsy Foundation in 1967. It now includes the National Epilepsy League, which in December 2012 was merged with The Epilepsy Therapy Project.

The Epilepsy Foundation current positions include supporting diversity programs; supporting the right to equal employment, eliminating discrimination against epilepsy, and to those suffering with seizure disorders, commitment to their perceived vision on a better future, as well as cultural diversity.

== History ==
=== Forum invasion ===
On March 28, 2008, Wired News reported that "Internet griefers"—a slang term for people whose only interests are in harassing others—assaulted an epilepsy support forum run by the Epilepsy Foundation of America. JavaScript code and flashing computer animations were posted to trigger migraine headaches and seizures in people with photosensitive or pattern-sensitive epilepsy. According to Wired News, circumstantial evidence suggested that the attack was perpetrated by Anonymous users, with the initial attack posts on the epilepsy forum blaming eBaum's World. Members of the epilepsy forum claimed they had found a thread in which the attack was being planned at 7chan.org, an imageboard that has been described as a stronghold for Anonymous. The thread, like all old threads eventually do on these types of imageboards, has since cycled to deletion.

RealTechNews reported that the forum at the United Kingdom-based National Society for Epilepsy, now called Epilepsy Society was also subjected to an identical attack. It stated that "apparent members of Anonymous" had denied responsibility for both attacks and posted that it had been the Church of Scientology who carried them out. News.com.au reported that the administrators of 7chan.org had posted an open letter claiming that the attacks had been carried out by the Church of Scientology "to ruin the public opinion of Anonymous, to lessen the effect of the lawful protests against their virulent organization" under the Church's fair game policy. The church has previously been involved in false flag operations to frame and discredit groups or peoples it disagrees with such as Operation Freakout and Gabe Cazares.

The Tech Herald reported that when the attack began, posts referenced multiple groups, including Anonymous. The report attributes the attack to a group named "The Internet Hate Machine" (a reference to the KTTV Fox 11 news report), who claim to be part of Anonymous, but are not the same faction that are involved in the campaign against Scientology. Some Anonymous participants of Project Chanology suggest that the perpetrators are Internet users who merely remained anonymous in the literal sense, and thus had no affiliation with the larger anti-Scientology efforts attributed to Anonymous. During an interview with CNN, Scientologist Tommy Davis accused Anonymous of hacking into the Epilepsy Foundation website to make it display imagery intended to cause epileptic seizures. Interviewer John Roberts contended the FBI said that it "found nothing to connect this group Anonymous (with these actions)," and that it also has "no reason to believe that these charges will be leveled against this group." The response was that the matter was on the hands of local law enforcement and that there were ongoing investigations.

== Lawsuit ==
2006 lawsuit

According to a Wall Street Journal report in 2006, the foundation, with its local affiliates, was lobbying for state laws in 25 states that would prevent pharmacists from substituting generic epilepsy drugs for brand-name drugs unless the pharmacist had written consent of the physician or patient. The pharmaceutical industry was also lobbying state legislatures for the change, and working with the foundation.

The pharmaceutical industry spent $8.8 million in state campaign contributions in 2006. In its annual report, the Epilepsy Foundation reported that it got $500,000 to $999,999 from GlaxoSmithKline, and $100,000 to $499,999 from each of Abbott Laboratories and Johnson & Johnson. At the time of publication, representatives of four pharmaceutical companies sat on the Epilepsy Foundation's board, as did Billy Tauzin, head of PhRMA, which gave $25,000 to $49,999. The Foundation denied that pharmaceutical funding had anything to do with its support of the laws.

Generic drug substitution is significant, because four major branded drugs, with that generated $5 billion revenue, went off-patent in 2010. (At the time the five best-selling drugs were Topamax, Lamictal, Lyrica, Keppra and Depakote. Pharmacists can substitute generics, because every generic drug, in order to be approved, has to demonstrate that it is equivalent to the branded drug.

The Epilepsy Foundation received anecdotal reports of patients experiencing seizures and side effects after switching drugs, and tried to convince the U.S. Food and Drug Administration (FDA) in 1999 that there was a problem, but the FDA decided there was no evidence. In 2006, foundation leaders convened a committee of medical experts, and its own experts also found no evidence. Nonetheless, they recommended that doctors be required to give permission to switch their patients' prescriptions to generic drugs. Gary Buehler, at the time the director of the FDA's office of generic drugs, said, "The only way you can somehow pin this down is to do a good study."
