= Cazares =

Cazares is a surname originating in Spain. Notable people with the surname include:

- Dino Cazares (born 1966), American musician
- Gabe Cazares (1920–2006), American mayor
- Gabriella Cázares-Kelly (born 1982), Tohono Oʼodham and American educator, community organizer, and politician
- Hugo Cázares (born 1978), Mexican boxer
- Juan Cazares (born 1992), Ecuadorian footballer
