= Operation Snow White =

Criminal conspiracy by the Church of Scientology

Operation Snow White was a criminal conspiracy by the Church of Scientology during the 1970s to purge unfavorable records about Scientology and its founder, L. Ron Hubbard. Carried out by the Church's Guardian's Office, the project included a series of infiltrations into and thefts from 136 government agencies, foreign embassies and consulates, as well as private organizations critical of Scientology, by Church members in more than 30 countries. It was one of the largest infiltrations of the United States government in history, with up to 5,000 covert agents.

The operation began in 1973 with a Guardian's Office order calling for the removal of "erroneous" Scientology files, and it grew into a campaign of infiltration, wiretapping, and theft of documents in government offices, most notably those of the US Internal Revenue Service (IRS) and the Department of Justice. It began to unravel in 1976, when the FBI caught two operatives inside a federal courthouse in Washington, D.C. On July 8, 1977, the FBI raided Scientology offices in Los Angeles and Washington, D.C., in a raid that involved 156 agents in Los Angeles alone. Operation Snow White was the case that initiated the US government's investigation of the Church, which also exposed the Scientology plot "Operation Freakout".

Eleven highly placed Church executives, including Mary Sue Hubbard (third wife of Hubbard and second-in-command of the organization), were convicted in federal court of obstructing justice, burglary of government offices, and theft of documents and government property. Most pleaded guilty, while two defendants who had resisted extradition from the United Kingdom were convicted in 1980. The case was United States v. Mary Sue Hubbard et al., 493 F.Supp. 209 (D.D.C. 1979). L. Ron Hubbard was named by federal prosecutors as an unindicted co-conspirator.

== Background ==
=== Scientology and the US government ===
As early as 1960, L. Ron Hubbard had proposed that Scientologists should infiltrate government departments by taking secretarial, bodyguard, or other jobs. In the early 1970s, the Church of Scientology was increasingly scrutinized by US federal agencies, having already been raided by the Food and Drug Administration in 1963. The Internal Revenue Service (IRS) claimed the Church owed millions of dollars in taxes and the Federal Bureau of Investigation (FBI) sent agents into the organization. The Church's response involved a publicity campaign, extensive litigation against the IRS and a program of infiltration of agency offices.

=== The Guardian's Office ===
The specific branch of Scientology responsible for Operation Snow White was the Guardian's Office. Created in 1966 by L. Ron Hubbard, the purpose of the Guardian's Office was to protect the interests of Scientology.

At the time of Operation Snow White, the Guardian's Office had its worldwide headquarters (Guardian's Office WW) located at Saint Hill Manor in England. Headquarters in the United States (Guardian's Office US) were in Los Angeles, California, though smaller offices existed in Washington, D.C. (Guardian's Office DC), and other cities throughout the United States. Each Guardian Office consisted of five bureaus. One such bureau was the Information Bureau, which oversaw the infiltration of the government. L. Ron Hubbard oversaw the Guardian's Office, though it was Mary Sue Hubbard, his wife, who held the title Commodore Staff Guardian.

== Planning and orders ==
=== Interpol infiltration plan ===
Several years later, in 1973, the Guardian's Office began a massive infiltration of governments around the world, though the primary target of the operation was the United States. Worried about Scientology's long-term reputation, the Guardian's Office decided to infiltrate Interpol to obtain documents related to Scientology, as well as those connecting L. Ron Hubbard to criminal activity. Jane Kember (Note: Jane Kember: Guardian World-Wide (GWW), headed daily operations of all Guardian's Offices, reported directly to Mary Sue Hubbard who reported directly to L. Ron Hubbard.) handed this duty to Henning Heldt and his staff.

Around this time L. Ron Hubbard himself wrote Guardian Order 732, which called for the removal and correction of "erroneous" Scientology files. It is here that Operation Snow White has its origins. Though the order called for this to be achieved by legal means, this would quickly change. Hubbard himself would later be named by federal prosecutors as an "unindicted co-conspirator" for his part in the operation. Though extensive records of his involvement exist, many Scientologists claim his directives were misinterpreted by his followers.

=== Expansion of agencies to infiltrate ===
Operation Snow White would be further refined by Guardian Order 1361. Addressed from Jane Kember to Heldt, Duke Snider, and Richard Weigand, (Note: Richard "Dick" Weigand was Deputy Guardian for Information U.S. until May 15, 1977; one of those convicted in United States v. Hubbard.) GO 1361 called for, among other things, an infiltration of the Los Angeles and London offices of the IRS, and the Department of Justice.

While the order was specific to the IRS, the Guardian's Office was soon recruiting their own field agents to infiltrate other governmental offices, including the Drug Enforcement Administration (DEA), the United States Coast Guard (USCG) intelligence service, and the National Institute of Mental Health, among others, as well as the American Medical Association. The program called for rewards to be given for successful missions carried out by Scientologists.

One of the sentencing memoranda in the case also noted that, contrary to what the defendants claimed, the programs planned by the Guardian's Office were not restricted to trying to remove "false reports" but included plans to plant false information—for instance, planting false records about "a cat with a pedigree name" into US security agency computers so that later "the creature holds a press conference and photographic story results." The purpose of Operation Cat was "to hold up the American security to ridicule, as outlined in the GO by LRH."

== Implementation ==
The primary mission of the program was to steal documents from government and legal offices, either by copying them or removing them entirely. Most of the thefts involved break-ins of locked offices.

=== Infiltration of the IRS (1974) ===
The start of 1974 saw Michael Meisner appointed Assistant Guardian for Information in the District of Columbia (AG I DC). (Note: Michael Meisner: Assistant Guardian for Information in the District of Columbia (AG I DC) from January 1974 until June 1976.) Meisner's responsibilities included the implementation of all Information Bureau orders, programs, and projects within the DC area. Meisner's supervisor at this time was Duke Snider, the Assistant Guardian for DC, or AG DC. This was the highest position in Washington's GO office.

In July 1974, Meisner was ordered by Duke Snider to implement the previously written plan to obtain Interpol documents, which were then located in the United States Department of the Treasury. Meisner had more to do than just this, though, as by August he was also taking directions from Cindy Raymond, the GO's Collections Officer for the US, who ordered Meisner to assist her in finding a loyal Scientologist agent to gain employment at the IRS headquarters in Washington, DC. This employee was to steal all documents dealing with Scientology, especially those involving current litigation by Scientology against the government. Meisner discussed this with Raymond for a period of a month before interviewing various Scientologists with no luck. A month after the order had been given, Raymond informed Meisner that she had selected Gerald Bennett Wolfe.

The GO's actual infiltration of the government likely began when Gerald Wolfe and Michael Meisner were able to gain employment at the IRS as clerk-typists. Under direction of the Guardian Office, Wolfe monitored files on tax-exempt organizations and, when requested, illegally made copies for Scientology. Meisner supervised both Wolfe and the Information Bureau section in DC, and reported to the GO's Deputy Guardian for Information in the US.

In November 1974, Operation Snow White took an unexpected turn for the GO when they received word that the IRS would be conducting a meeting on Scientology's tax-exempt status. In response, the church sent a spy to bug the room. On the morning of November 1, the day before the meeting, a GO agent, Hermann, (Note: Mitchell Hermann: also known as Mike Cooper, was Information Branch I Director from January 1974 until March 1975, under Michael Meisner. Later, held the position of Southeast US Secretary (SEUS SEC) from January 1976 until March 1977 under the name "Mike Cooper". Hermann was one of those convicted in United States v. Hubbard.) broke into the conference room and plugged the device into an electrical outlet. This device, in turn, then transmitted a signal on an FM frequency, which was picked up and recorded by Scientologists sitting in a car in the parking lot of the Smithsonian, which faced the office. After the meeting Hermann removed the device, and the taped recording of the meeting was sent to Los Angeles.

By December, Wolfe, Hermann, and Meisner had sent a shipment of stolen documents 20 inches thick to Duke Snider. Snider, in turn, sent notification to Mo Budlong in Los Angeles. By the end of December, Wolfe was stealing documents from the IRS Chief Counsel's office. Just days after Christmas, Wolfe broke into the office of Barbara Bird, an attorney in the IRS's Refund Litigation Service. Bird had been present at the November 1st meeting. Instead of stealing files, Wolfe took them to a copier and made photocopies using government paper.

Later, Wolfe met Meisner at a restaurant, where he reported on his most recent theft. Meisner took the documents and underlined selections that he believed his superiors would find interesting or relevant and wrote a summary of the important points. This was then routed through the Assistant Guardian for DC and on to the Deputy Guardian for the US, the Deputy Guardian for Information in the US, the Branch I Director of the Information Bureau, and the Collections Officer, all of which were in Los Angeles. A copy was also sent to Mary Sue Hubbard. This was typically standard procedure for Meisner.

=== Infiltration of other agencies (1975) ===
In early 1975, Operation Snow White expanded again as Sharon Thomas found employment in the USCG intelligence service and Nancy Douglass began work at the DEA. Douglass stole documents and made photocopies of others. These were transmitted to Hermann.

By spring, attention had been called back to the IRS case as Mary Sue Hubbard had instructed Kember and Heldt to "use any method at our disposal to win the battle and gain our non-profit (tax) status". Heldt wrote back telling that her request had been sent to the Information Bureau, who had been ordered to complete the collection of documents from the IRS and the Department of Justice's tax files within three months.

In April 1975, Meisner procured a directory of the Department of Justice and located the offices that would have files pertaining to Scientology litigation. When he found what he wanted he sent in Wolfe, who broke into the offices of two attorneys on three successive Saturdays in May 1975. Wolfe copied twelve files and met up with Meisner, as before, at a restaurant. These files were especially useful to Scientology, as it detailed the government's strategy in various court cases.

In May 1975, Willardson directed Meisner to implement "Project Horn", which called for Meisner to "provide a cover for 'PR and legal' for the way they obtained IRS docs". The idea would be for the GO's Public Relations Bureau to view the documents without worrying about being connected to the theft. Willardson's idea called for Meisner to steal documents dealing with organizations other than Scientology. Willardson also called for the theft of IRS stationery, in order to forge letters from a [fictional] disgruntled IRS employee. The files on various organizations (including Scientology, of course) would then be sent out attached to the fake letter. The idea was that it would appear that an upset IRS agent had sent the files to numerous organizations. There would be nothing to tie it to Scientology. Wolfe stole both the stationery and, without permission, files on the Unification Church and Bob Jones University.

=== Stealing the government's case files (1975-76) ===
During the summer and fall months of 1975, the GO launched an additional plan. In July, Meisner was told by Cindy Raymond that the Church of Scientology had initiated a Freedom of Information Act (FOIA) lawsuit against the IRS. Meisner was directed to add the office of Charles Zuravin to his list of offices to monitor. Zuravin was representing the government in the case. Meisner immediately passed this duty on to Wolfe, who broke into Zuravin's office multiple times between July and November. Wolfe revealed to his superiors that Zuravin was preparing an index of Scientology files relevant to the FOIA case. IRS offices from all over the country were sending files to Zuravin. This index file, required by the courts in all FOIA cases, is a total list of the documents requested, and reasons for their exemption from the public, if any.

By October, Zuravin had finished the index, numbering each document in order to simplify location, and had provided a copy to Scientology attorneys. These attorneys, in turn, gave the index to Raymond, who passed it along to Meisner, who passed it to Wolfe. Wolfe then entered Zuravin's office and then began copying the documents listed on the index. Zuravin had essentially done the GO's job for them.

On December 5, 1975, Jane Kember issued Guardian Program Order 158, which intended to give L. Ron Hubbard early warning of impending legal action. The plan called for the infiltration of the government agencies that had either the power to issue, or the knowledge of, impending subpoenas. Specific agencies include the US Attorney's Office in D.C. and LA, the IRS Office of International Operations, the DEA, and the Coast Guard and Immigration and Naturalization. After reviewing the letter, Meisner concluded it would be a better idea to infiltrate the Department of Justice than the US Attorney's Office.

In January 1976, Hermann, the Southeast US Secretary for the Information Bureau, informed Meisner that Heldt and Weigand had approved a plan to send Don Alverzo (Note: Don Alverzo: Deputy Information Branch I Director US.) to Washington. Alverzo arrived on the 17th, and on the 18th he picked the locks on the doors belonging to the office of Lewis Hubbard (no relation to L. Ron Hubbard) and the file room housing Zuravin's files. Wolfe stood guard at the end of the hallway while Alverzo worked on Hubbard's door. A few doors down Meisner worked on Zuravin's door. After an hour and a half with no success, Meisner was getting upset. In frustration, Meisner hit the top of Zuravin's door, which popped right open. The three Scientologists entered the office and took the remaining Scientology related documents. They then traveled to another floor where they made photocopies. Wolfe continued to make copies while Alverzo and Meisner tried again to open Hubbard's office. The trio then worked well into the night photocopying files from Hubbard's office. When they left, sometime around 2 AM, they left with a foot tall stack of documents. Less than a month later Richard Weigand wrote to Jane Kember, telling her that the IRS documents that had been ordered to be produced in Guardian Order 1361, over two years earlier, had been obtained.

=== Forged IDs and expanded targets (1976) ===
Gerald Wolfe, along with Meisner, were later able to break into a room and make false IRS identification cards, which allowed them access to the federal courthouse in Washington. Wolfe and Meisner then used these cards to gain access to restricted areas and steal more documents.

While Wolfe and Meisner continued their work at the IRS, Mary Sue Hubbard, along with other Guardian Office members, were coming up with further plans. Guardian Program Order 302, written by Cindy Raymond and approved by Hubbard, amongst others, directed the infiltration of all government agencies that had withheld files from Scientology's various FOIA requests.

On the night of April 14, Meisner and Wolfe were on the tenth floor of the IRS building housing the "Office of International Operations". Trying to enter an office, the pair found it locked. A passing cleaning lady noted Meisner and Wolfe's suspicious behavior, and notified a security guard. The guard confronted the pair and was presented with Wolfe's genuine IRS card and Meisner's fabricated one. Satisfied, the guard had the cleaning lady open the door. Inside, the pair grabbed a hefty load of files. Unable to find a photocopier, they then took the files to the main IRS building, where they again used their identification to gain access. After copying the files, they returned them to Crate's office. (Note: Mr. Thomas Crate of OIO (IRS's Office of International Operations) was the tax auditor assigned to the Hubbard case.) The entire process took some four hours.

=== Targeting a federal prosecutor (May-June 1976) ===
In May, Wolfe broke into the United States Courthouse and stole keys to the office of Assistant United States Attorney Nathan Dodell. Wolfe then took these keys to have them duplicated, and returned them unnoticed. Almost three weeks later, Wolfe and Meisner broke into Dodell's office, stealing documents and, as usual, forwarding them to Guardian headquarters in Los Angeles. The GO's interest in Nathan Dodell stemmed from a Scientology FOIA case. In April, Judge George L Hart asked Dodell whether the US had considered taking a deposition of L. Ron Hubbard. Dodell responded that it was an "interesting thought". Furthermore, he promised to discuss it with the Department of Justice.

In May, Meisner and Wolfe entered the US Courthouse for the District of Columbia around four in the afternoon. They went to the third floor, which was the home of both the US Attorney's Office and the Bar Association Library. They planned to locate Nathan Dodell's office, which was in the back of the Civil Division area, near an elevator. They then searched for the building's photocopiers. After mapping out these locations, they left. Later, Wolfe and Meisner made a copy of Dodell's keys.

On May 21, Meisner and Wolfe entered the Courthouse, signing in to do research in the library and were issued an elevator key. After riding the elevator to the floor of the library, the pair entered the library and removed several books from shelves and sat at a table. After a few minutes, they exited through a backdoor and emerged in a hallway. In this hallway was Dodell's office, which they entered using their keys. They stole a number of documents related to Scientology and walked through the hallway to the two copy machines they had previously located. They photocopied some six inches of documents before returning the originals to Dodell's office.

One week later, Wolfe and Meisner again met outside the IRS building. The two men then walked to the US Courthouse, and signed in under fake names. They repeated their actions from the previous week, copying another group of documents from the District of Columbia Police Department as well as the Food and Drug Administration. Returning to Dodell's office through the library, they were stopped by the night librarian, who asked if they had signed in. While they had signed in at the building's front desk, they had failed to do the same at the front desk of the library. When they announced that they had not, Johnson, the night librarian, told the pair not to come back unless they had specific authorization from the day librarian. The pair promptly left. Three days later, Johnson notified the US Attorney's Office that two individuals had been seen using the photocopying machines of the Attorney's Office. Johnson and the night guard were told to immediately contact the FBI if the individuals returned.

Less than two weeks later, Hermann phoned Meisner, and ordered him to return to Dodell's office and steal his personal files. The goal was to formulate a plan that would result in Dodell being removed from his position as an Assistant US Attorney for the District of Columbia.

=== Discovery by the FBI (June 11, 1976) ===
Meisner and Wolfe entered the United States Courthouse on June 11, 1976 around 7:00 in the evening. They signed in as they did before, and headed to the library. Johnson, the night librarian, recognized the pair and immediately stopped them. Meisner was prepared for this, and showed the man a letter from the head librarian. Wolfe and Meisner continued to the back of the library where they exited into the hallway. Outside Dodell's office the two saw that cleaning ladies were still at work.

While Meisner and Wolfe waited for the cleaning crew to vacate the office, Johnson called the FBI, which sent two agents over immediately. The two agents confronted the Scientologists and demanded to see their identification. Wolfe used his real identification. Meisner presented his fake card, and told the agents that he had recently resigned from the IRS. Meisner told Hansen that the pair was in the library to do legal research, and that they had used the photocopiers to copy books and cases. Neither mentioned Scientology. After roughly twenty minutes of questioning, the FBI agents allowed them to leave. Meisner then phoned Hermann to inform him of the news and was told to immediately fly to Los Angeles.

== Investigation and prosecution ==
=== Arrests and cover-up attempts (1976-1977) ===
Meisner and Wolfe were given cover stories by the Guardian's Office. On the last day of June 1976, Gerald Wolfe was arrested. Wolfe was charged with "the use and possession of a forged official pass of the United States." The day after Wolfe's arrest, Mary Sue Hubbard wrote a letter to Weigand ordering him to keep her abreast of the situation. Hubbard also conversed with Mo Budlong and Richard Weigand about Wolfe's arrest, cover story, and subsequent plan to destroy evidence linking Wolfe and Meisner to Scientology.

At the end of July, a judge decided that the case against Wolfe warranted an investigation by a grand jury. A week later the judge issued an arrest warrant for Meisner, who, at the time, was being hidden in Los Angeles. The FBI was able to connect him to Scientology. By January 1977, it was becoming increasingly likely that Scientology would be unable to escape Operation Snow White without serious penalty. Though Meisner was still in hiding, he was growing increasingly anxious about the situation. By April 1977, Meisner wanted to surrender to the authorities. Meisner was quickly put under the control of several guards.

On May 13, Gerald Wolfe entered a guilty plea. Later in the month, Meisner escaped his captors, only to be convinced to rejoin the GO the following day.

In June, Wolfe, after being sentenced to probation and community service, testified before the Grand Jury. Instead of the truth, Wolfe told the latest incarnation of his cover story. Several days later on June 20, 1977 Meisner again escaped his captors, though this time he was able to contact the FBI and surrender. Meisner was taken to Washington, where he agreed to plead guilty to a five-year conspiracy felony and cooperate with the Grand Jury. Meisner was placed in protective custody of the US Marshals Service.

=== FBI raids on Scientology premises (July 8, 1977) ===
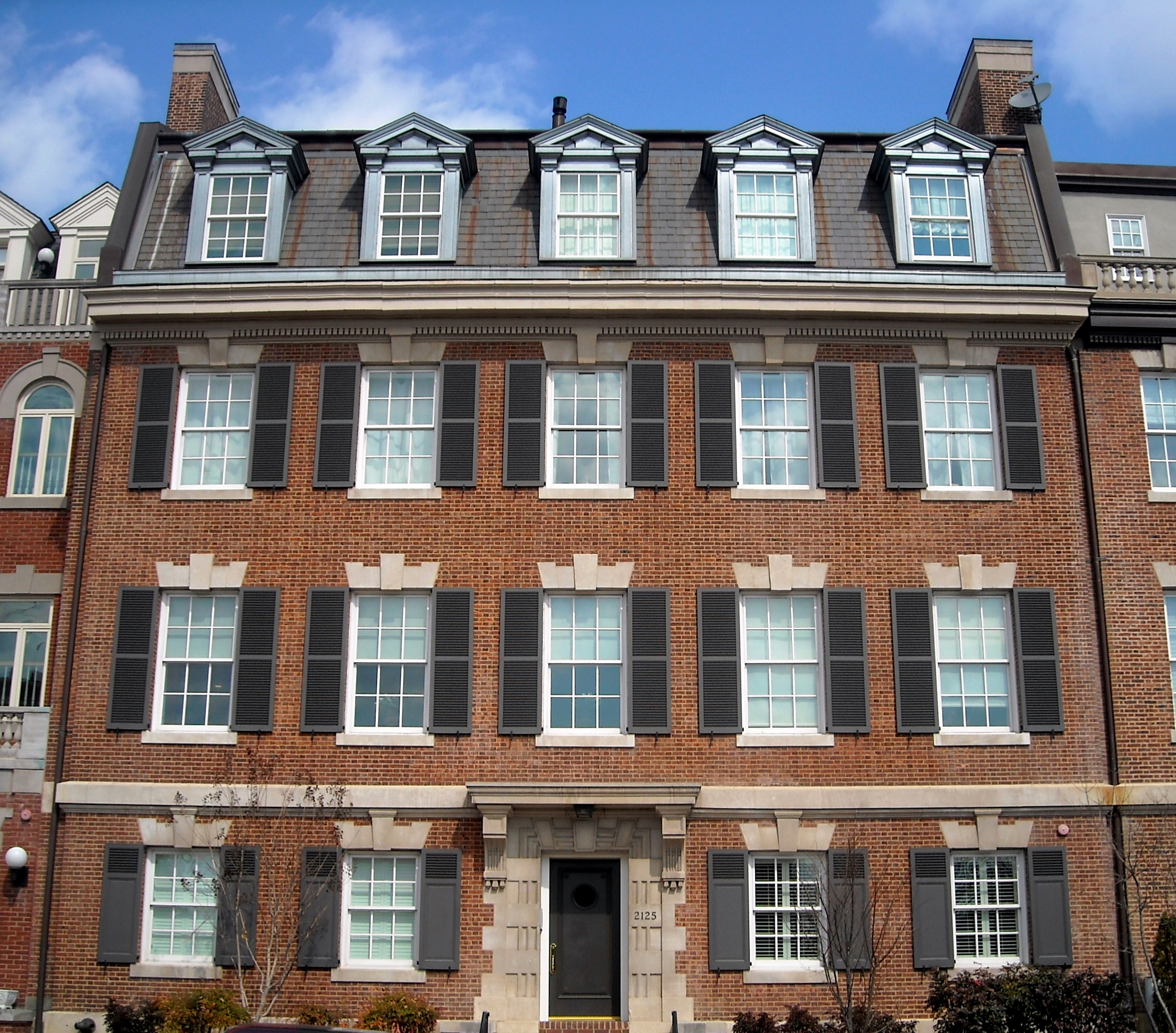
From 1964 to 1995, the Founding Church of Scientology in Washington, D.C. The building was raided by the FBI in July 1977.

On July 8, 1977 the FBI raided Church of Scientology locations in Los Angeles, Hollywood and Washington, D.C. The Los Angeles raid involved 156 FBI agents, the most that had ever been used in a single raid. It lasted 21 hours and filled a 16-ton truck with documents and other items.

The Church compared the FBI's raid to the Gestapo, asserted that the seizures were illegal, and that some of the removed documents may even have been planted evidence, though the FBI produced a 40-plus page affidavit detailing 160 specific items they were looking for.

By July 20, 13 days after the raid, a Washington judge ruled that the documents should be returned, at least temporarily, to the Church, and that none of the documents could be shared with branches of the government, unless that specific branch was investigating Scientology. Scientology's lawyers had successfully argued that in order to prepare for an August 8 hearing on the legality of the raid, they must be able to see the documents. By July 27, a judge in Washington had ruled the warrant authorizing the raid was too broad and violated the Church's Fourth Amendment rights. In August, this ruling was overturned, and Scientology promised to take the case to the Supreme Court, which refused to hear the case.

The documents seized in the raids turned up more than the illegal activities against the United States government, but also illegal activities carried out against other perceived enemies of Scientology. These included "Operation Freakout", a conspiracy to frame author Paulette Cooper on false bomb-threat charges, and conspiracies to frame Gabe Cazares, mayor of Clearwater, Florida, on false hit-and-run charges. The papers also revealed that Sir John Foster (author of the official UK Government inquiry into Scientology) and Lord Balniel (who had requested the report) were targets, along with the National Association for Mental Health (NAMH) and World Federation for Mental Health.

=== Indictments and plea agreements (1978) ===
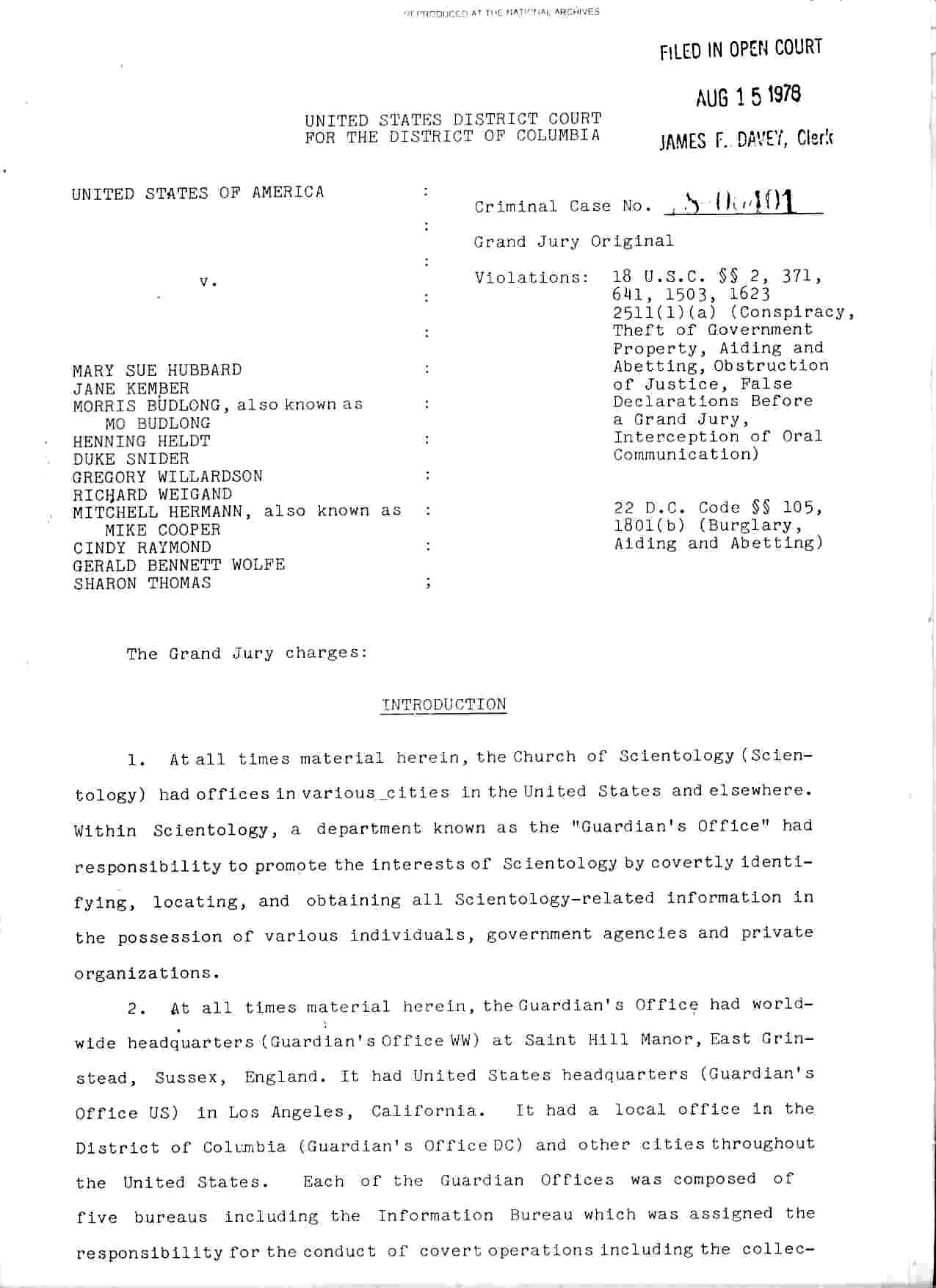
Grand Jury Charges, Introduction, United States of America v. Mary Sue Hubbard, United States District Court for the District of Columbia, 1978

In August 1978, 11 high-ranking members of Scientology were indicted on 28 charges. One of the indicted was Mary Sue Hubbard, wife of Scientology's creator L. Ron Hubbard. The other ten were Gerald Wolfe, Cindy Raymond, Henning Heldt, Duke Snider, Gregory Willardson, Richard Weigand, Mitchell Hermann, Sharon Thomas, Jane Kember, and Mo Budlong. Kendrick Moxon and L. Ron Hubbard were named unindicted co-conspirators.

Over the course of the investigation, the Church of Scientology attempted to have a judge removed, and subpoenaed almost 150 federal agents in what appeared to be a large stalling scheme. The Church also offered several shifting explanations for their actions. Ultimately, these tactics failed and the defendants agreed to a plea deal.

Seven of the 11 members of the Guardian's Office pleaded guilty to just a single count of conspiracy to obstruct justice. One more pleaded guilty to a similar charge and a ninth pleaded guilty to a misdemeanor. The Scientologists were allowed to argue for the suppression of the government's evidence. The remaining two Scientologists were in England, pending extradition.

=== Sentencing and appeals (1979) ===
On December 6, 1979, some five years after Operation Snow White began, it officially came to an end. Five of the Scientologists were sentenced to four years in jail, with four of the convicted being taken immediately. Mary Sue Hubbard, wife of L. Ron Hubbard, was sentenced to five years. Each of the six faced a fine of $10,000. The next day the four remaining Scientologists were sentenced. Three of the four faced a fine of $10,000 and five years in jail. The fourth was fined $1,000 and sent to jail for six months. Upon release Mary Sue Hubbard was given five years of probation and community service. All of the Scientologists immediately appealed, but the verdicts were confirmed.

=== Kember and Budlong: extradition and conviction (1980) ===
Sentencing memo, Kember and Budlong, 1980

Kember and Budlong had claimed political asylum in the UK, arguing that they should not be extradited to the US because the burglaries had political objectives. Their application against extradition was denied by the British High Court on the grounds that it did not fall within the political offence exception to the Extradition Act 1870; Mr. Justice Griffiths said:

I am unable to accept that organising burglaries either for the purpose of identifying persons in Government offices hostile to the Scientologists, or for the purpose of gaining an advantage in litigation, or even for the wider purpose of refuting false allegations thus enabling a better image of the Church of Scientology to be projected to the public, comes anywhere near being an offence of a political character within the meaning of the Extradition Act.

The Applicants did not order these burglaries to take place in order to challenge the political control or Government of the United States; they did so to further the interests of the Church of Scientology and its members, and in particular the interest of L. Ron Hubbard, the founder of Scientology. In my view, it would be ridiculous to regard the Applicants as political refugees seeking asylum in this country, and I reject the submission that these were offences of a political character.

In November 1980, the two remaining Scientologists, Jane Kember and Mo Budlong, were finally convicted at trial on nine counts of aiding and abetting burglary in connection with break-ins at government offices, and were sentenced to six years. Three of the nine others who had previously plead guilty were ordered to perform community service for their contempt of court in refusing to testify in the trial of Kember and Budlong.

=== Outcome ===
Mary Sue Hubbard, Cindy Raymond, Gerald Bennett Wolfe, Henning Heldt, Duke Snider, Gregory Willardson, Richard Weigand, Mitchell Hermann, Sharon Thomas, Jane Kember, and Mo Budlong, all high-ranking Scientologists, were convicted; prison sentences were as long as six years, though no defendant served that amount. L. Ron Hubbard was named by federal prosecutors as an "unindicted co-conspirator" and went into hiding for the rest of his life.

A series of sentencing orders dated Dec. 11, 1979 show some of the results of the trial.

Defendant	Charge	Prison time	Fine
Morris Budlong	Burglary, Aiding and Abetting	2–6 years	
Henning Heldt	Conspiracy	4 years	$10,000
Mitchell Hermann	Conspiracy	4 years	$10,000
Jane Kember	Burglary, Aiding and Abetting	2–6 years	
Cindy Raymond	Conspiracy	5 years	$10,000
Mary Sue Hubbard	Conspiracy	5 years	$10,000
Duke Snider	Conspiracy	4 years	$10,000
Sharon Thomas	Theft of Government Property	1 year (6 months served); 5 years probation	$1,000
Richard Weigand	Conspiracy	4 years	$10,000
Gregory Willardson	Conspiracy	4 years	$10,000
Gerald Bennett Wolfe	Conspiracy	5 years	$10,000

By 1990, all eleven defendants in Operation Snow White were free.

== Aftermath ==
Operation Snow White extended to Canada and resulted in legal proceedings against the Church.

The Church has been reluctant to discuss Operation Snow White. Typical statements by members and operatives are often vague comments saying that the Guardian's Office (GO) had been "infiltrated" and "set up" to fail in its mission to protect the Church, that those involved were "purged" from the Church, without detailing what actually happened (although it has been suggested many of those involved and "purged" remained in important positions of power within the Church). Church spokespersons on the Internet and elsewhere have been known to claim that the operatives "had done nothing more serious than steal photocopier paper."

== See also ==
- United States v. Hubbard
- David Gaiman
- List of Guardian's Office operations
- Project Normandy
- Scientology controversies
- Scientology in the United States
