= Clearwater Hearings =

1982 public investigation into Scientology

The Clearwater Hearings were a 1982 Clearwater, Florida commission that investigated the Church of Scientology and Project Normandy.

== Witnesses ==
Among the witnesses who testified were Ron DeWolf, Edward Walter, Lori Taverna, Casey Kelly, Rosie Pace, David Ray, Ernest and Adelle Hartwell, George Meister, Lavenda Van Schaick, Janie Peterson, Sharon McKee, Scott Mayer, Robert Dardino, John Clark, Paulette Cooper, and Brown McKee.

== Findings ==
The commission uncovered a number of illegal activities committed by the church, including:

- murder of Susan Meister
- having Tonja Burden, as a minor, sign promissory notes to the church
- negligence and abuse of children
- theft of government documents
- forging of government ID cards
- giving money to its founder, L. Ron Hubbard
- harassment of reporters and alleged attackers
- harboring of fugitive Mike Meisner
- perjury in federal courts

The commission likewise found unethical activities committed by the church, including:

- lying about the ends and benefits of auditing
- fabrication of L. Ron Hubbard's life
- forging of evidence for Hubbard's life
- unsanitary living conditions for Scientologists
- abortions by beating women in the stomach
- using a front to buy Fort Harrison
- false witness against alleged attackers
- "widespread, intercontinental espionage"
- justifying all the aforementioned as religion

Finally, the commission found the following about L. Ron Hubbard:

- had suicidal thoughts after leaving the Navy
- continuously wrote to the FBI about alleged Communist plots against him
- refused to get help for his mental illness
- wrote to a magazine posing as a woman
- married three times, and one time practiced polygamy
- abused and performed pseudoscientific experiments on Sara Hubbard
- performed abortions by beating women in their stomachs
- surrounded himself with very young girls who did his every whim
- founded Scientology to make money for himself
- made extravagant purchases and lacked personal management
- was obsessed with blood while making movies
