= List of Guardian's Office operations =

Covert operations by Church of Scientology

From its establishment in 1966 to its demise in the early 1980s, the Guardian's Office (GO) of the Church of Scientology carried out numerous covert operations and programs against a range of perceived opponents of Scientology in the United States and around the world. The GO sought to discredit, destroy or otherwise neutralize – or "depower", in Scientology jargon – any group or individual that it regarded as anti-Scientology. Instructions for such operations were distributed in the form of individually numbered "Guardian Program Orders", abbreviated as GPgmOs, which were distributed from the GO leadership to GO branches in Churches of Scientology and ultimately used to task agents.

== Operations ==
=== Operation Big Mouth ===
Operation Big Mouth was a plan devised by the GO to discredit Nathan Dodell, an Assistant US Attorney who represented the government in several cases involving Scientology. Dodell was believed by the GO to be "assiduously collecting files on Scientology to show (a) harassment of the U.S. government [by Scientologists] and (b) violations of the law by Scientology." Jimmy Mulligan, an assistant to L. Ron Hubbard's wife and GO head Mary Sue Hubbard, instructed GO agents to "finally and terminatedly handle Mr. Dodell. He has been on our lines for many, many years. I would like for you to have very accurate and complete surveys done on him in D.C., and mock up and carry out some very professional, smooth, ops [operations] which will depower him fully." The Guardian's Office later concluded that it would be necessary to prove that Dodell was guilty of criminal conduct before the Church of Scientology could get him fired. GO agents repeatedly burglarized Dodell's office in the US Courthouse in Washington, D.C., and copied reams of documents about Scientology.

=== Operation Bulldozer Leak ===
Operation Bulldozer Leak (July 21, 1976) was designed to "effectively spread the rumor that will lead Government, media, and individual SPs [Suppressive Persons] to conclude that LRH [L. Ron Hubbard] has no control of the C of S [the Church of Scientology] and no legal liability for church activity." Assistant Guardians in all branches of the GO were ordered "to spread the rumor" via agents working undercover, who were to approach government officials, journalists and others who had been critical of Scientology. An agent "will in several different ways mention that he has heard that LRH no longer has any control of the Church; and that an ex-Scientologist has shown some articles ... that stated that it had definitely been established in several court cases precedents that LRH had no liability for any Church activity." If contacts could not be seen personally, they were to be telephoned "and the cover story and rumor given." The agents were provided with sample scripts which included lines such as: "So while the press likes to ride with the one-leader idea so as to make press, they could not be further from the truth." The plan envisaged using Scientologists as fake authors who would interview government officials and then casually mention that they'd "heard that LRH no longer has any control of the church."

=== Operation Bunny Bust ===
Operation Bunny Bust (July 15, 1976) was a covert operation mounted against Bette Orsini, a reporter with the St Petersburg Times newspaper in Florida. She had been undertaking a major investigation of Scientology in the early part of 1976 and had come to the GO's attention via its agent in the Internal Revenue Service, who came across her requests for information from the government. A weekly report sent from Dick Weigand to Mo Budlong stated:

Situation: St. Pete Times reporter Bette Orsini has been covertly attacking us by continuing her investigation toward a possible entheta [unfavorable] article on Scn [Scientology] tax situation. Why: Br I Base has been collecting data on her only and not attacking.

To resolve this, Joe Lisa, the assistant guardian for information at Scientology's Flag Land Base, proposed a plan codenamed Operation Information "to get Bette Orsini removed from a position of power and attack" at the Times. An agent posing as an aide to a Mafia figure would go to the Times office and leave $100 for Orsini, implying that it was a payoff to her for providing the Mafia with information from the newspaper's files. This plan was, however, apparently not attempted.

In July 1976, the GO initiated Operation Bunny Bust – an effort to attack Orsini via a charity group, the Easter Seal Society for Crippled Children and Adults, for which her husband Andrew worked as executive secretary. The GO discovered that the Easter Seal Society had forgotten to file an annual report with the Florida state authorities. This provided an opening for it to attack the Society, and by extension the Orsinis. Dick Weigand wrote to Mo Budlong to inform him: "A project has been drawn up and is now being implemented to show Easter Seal Society that Orsini (the executive secretary) has been operating as a fraud and has broken laws. This data is intended for a PR (public relations) attack." In November 1976, the GO began to mail an anonymous letter to various newspapers in Florida and to the St. Petersburg Consumer Affairs Department, the St. Petersburg Charitable Solicitations Board and the state attorney's office. Purportedly from a wealthy businessman, it complained that "an exhaustive independent probe" had found that the Easter Seal Society's financial and administrative affairs had been criminally mismanaged and called for the arrest and prosecution of Andrew Orsini.

The attack backfired when it was traced back to the Church of Scientology, and none of the newspapers to whom the letter had been sent ever published stories about the anonymous allegations. Bette Orsini found that a Scientologist named Ben A. Shaw had recently purchased copies of the Easter Seal Society's files from the Division of Licensing in Miami. He had misrepresented himself as a reporter for a University of Florida newspaper but was in fact an administrative assistant to the president of the Church of Scientology of Florida. When he was subpoenaed, he denied writing the anonymous letter or having any knowledge about it but he could not explain what he had done or was planning to do with the information that he had obtained. Orsini's investigations led her to two other Scientologists, who worked for the Clearwater Chamber of Commerce and the Clearwater Sun newspaper; both of them were undercover agents working for the GO. The agents had previously been involved in other Scientology covert operations. Weigand noted with concern that "the chain does lead to Orsini uncovering a Church operative network that could be used as a handle for a Grand Jury investigation of the Church activities which would include the Meisner/Silver scene [the Scientology agent who had infiltrated the IRS]." Before Orsini could take matters further, however, the FBI launched a massive raid on Scientology offices which led to the exposure of Operation Bunny Bust and the indictment and eventual conviction of 11 Scientologists, including Weigand and Budlong.

=== Operation Cat ===
Operation Cat (September 16, 1975) was a plan to "make a mockery and hold up to ridicule the computer, the security services and authority [sic] in relation to FOI [Freedom of Information]" by "plant[ing] grossly false information in governmental agencies, especially security services files, for later public retrieval and ridiculing exposure." The objective was "to hold up the American security to ridicule, as outlined in the GO by LRH." Written by David Gaiman, the Deputy Guardian for Public Relations Worldwide, the plan called for Scientology "to take a cat with a pedigree name, or some such and to get the name into a computer file, together with a record whether it be criminal social welfare, driving or whatever; and to build the sequence of events to the point where the creature holds a press conference and photographic story results." The "production targets" of the operation were to plant dossiers in four US government agencies, hold a press conference and achieve four national media articles and 50 local articles by February 20, 1976. The planning document for the operation was one of those seized by the FBI in its July 1977 raids against Scientology, and was subsequently entered as "Government Exhibit No. 5" in the case against Guardian Jane Kember and other senior GO staff.

=== Operation Chaos Leak ===
Operation Chaos Leak (April 1976) sought to attack the US Department of Justice (DoJ) and the Drug Enforcement Administration (DEA) by leaking a confidential DoJ internal report on the DEA. The plan envisaged causing "maximum chaos" to the DoJ and DEA by carrying out the leak and included elaborate details on how to leak the document without it being traced back to the Church of Scientology. The plan was concocted by Cindy Raymond, in the aftermath of Scientology losing a Freedom of Information Act lawsuit against the DEA. The GO believed that causing a public scandal would discredit the DEA and make it more likely that an appeal court judge would rule in favour of Scientology. Scientologist covert agent Michael Meisner stole a copy of the report from the DoJ and gave half of it to the Village Voice newspaper in New York City, pretending to be a disaffected DoJ employee.

=== Operation China Shop ===
Operation China Shop (1975) was a plan to take over the Clearwater Sun newspaper in Clearwater, Florida, by disrupting it and discrediting its reporters and editors. The newspaper had frequently been critical of the Church of Scientology, which had established its headquarters in Clearwater in controversial circumstances. Scientology responded by launching an operation to neutralize the newspaper; in a November 10, 1975, letter, Deputy Guardian US Henning Heldt wrote:

A study of the paper does not show a political or intelligence angle. Only evidence that the paper attacks everyone. Any Good News is converted to attack. This paper (Clearwater Sun) may influence the two other papers that have offices in Clearwater (St. Petersburg Times and Tampa Tribune, I believe) or these two influence the Sun.

The only conclusion that can be drawn is that somewhere in the editorial structure they have an institutional case - a has been one or a should be one. For it is a characteristic of insanity to attack everything...

Our target on this, very confidentially, is ownership or control of the paper. So, as you know, the finance information on the paper, its debts, its income (and how it could be cut) are prime information needs.

Heldt ordered Guardian's Office staff to collect evidence on Sun personnel including publisher John Ricketson, former editor Al Hutchison and then managing editor Ron Stuart. The GO successfully infiltrated an agent, identified as "Molly Gilliam", into the Sun and obtained detailed reports on internal discussions at the newspaper. The Sun's news and advertising departments were infiltrated to obtain information on the paper's finances and employees in conjunction with an operation called the "Sunrise Mission". The goal was to research the Sun's advertising policies, its principal advertisers and their business with the Sun, and the value of the newspaper's holdings, in order to determine whether the Church of Scientology could buy out the newspaper. The GO's agents were able to file almost daily reports on the Sun between January and October 1976, stealing files on advertising, finances, story outlines and legal correspondence. The items stolen included a 100-page computer printout about the newspaper's advertisers and records of its credit union. The GO was able to carry out a detailed financial analysis of the Sun's status using dozens of purloined revenue sheets and placed a value of $2.5 million on the newspaper.

As well as targeting the Sun, the GO also sought to target its advertisers and employees to discredit them or, in the case of the advertisers, to convince them to stop buying space in the paper. Operation China Shop included a plan to get the Sun's largest advertiser, the Maas Brothers department store, to pull its adverts by claiming that a Sun reporter "is looking into their back-grounds to print something sordid on them." A GO staff member reported: "I understand that Maas Brothers is the largest account in the Clearwater Sun and that they put about $400,000 into the Sun annually. If they were to pull out, the Sun may have to fold."

Two Sun reporters, Mark Sableman and Steven Advokat, were reported on daily and editor Ron Stuart was targeted with a smear campaign accusing him of sexual misconduct and drug abuse. It was claimed that Stuart and others had dated a "nymphomaniac" and his divorce was also investigated. One GO document asserted that because he "spends very little money--- eats at McDonald's-- (it) seems that Stuart may have some large undisclosed crime that he needs extra money for." Another memo accused Stuart and Sun staffers of drug abuse at an editorial staff party in October 1976.

In addition, the GO compiled details of Clearwater residents who wrote letters to the Sun that criticised Scientology. In April 1976, the names, addresses and phone numbers of around 50 Sun readers were obtained from the newspaper. GO staff proposed to investigate the readers' backgrounds.

=== Operation Cut Throat ===
Operation Cut Throat was one of a number of operations against regional outlets of the Better Business Bureau, in this case the St. Louis branch of the BBB. In July 1977, the FBI seized a number of documents "regarding infiltration and background information" about the St. Louis Better Business Bureau.

=== Operations Daniel and Dynamite ===
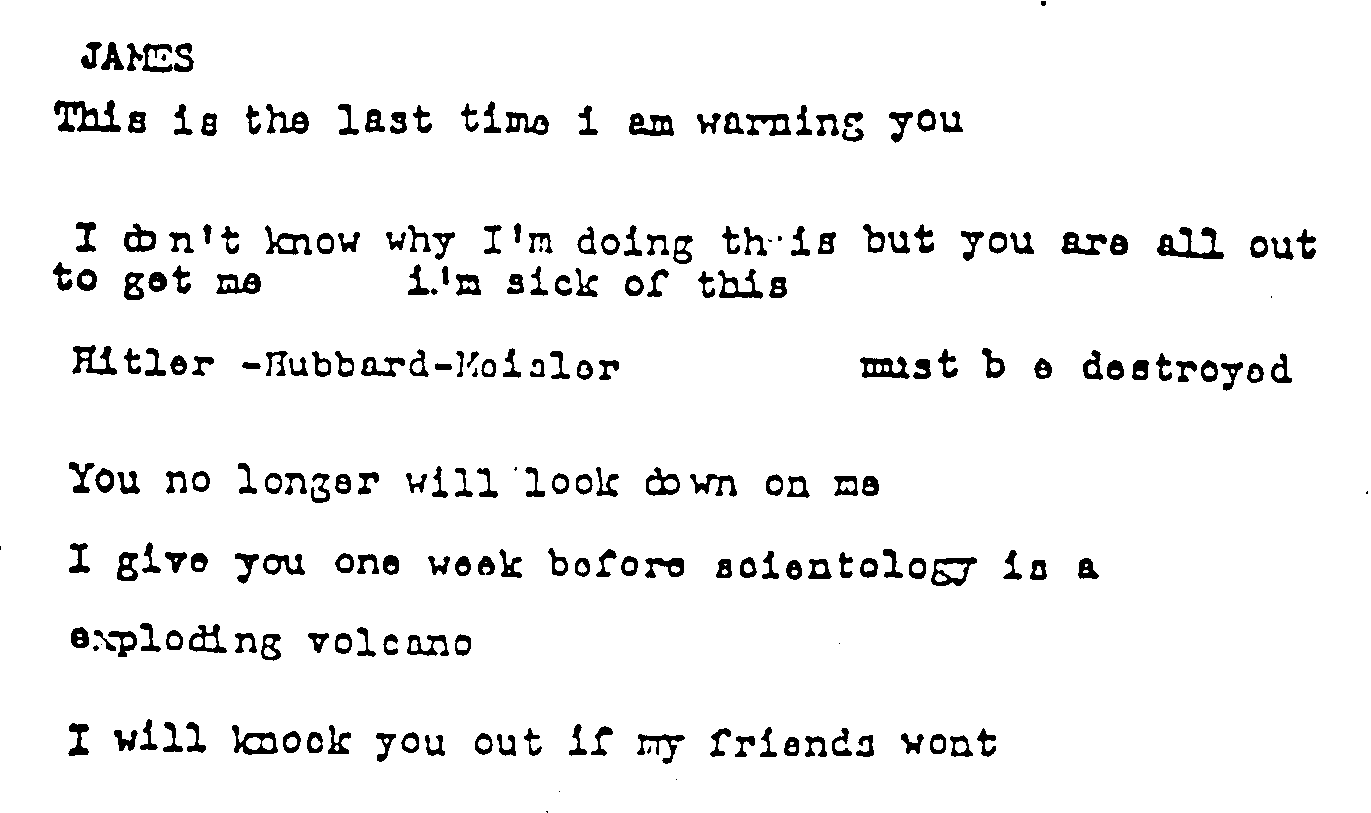
The second of the two forged bomb threats produced under Operation Dynamite

Operations Daniel and Dynamite were part of a years-long GO campaign against Paulette Cooper, author of the 1971 book The Scandal of Scientology. According to a GO "Intell[igence] US Weekly Report" of October 10, 1972, Operation Daniel was "wide-scale exposure of PC's sex life." During 1972, Cooper had faced an increasing campaign of harassment from Scientology; her name and phone number was posted on street walls so that she would receive obscene phone calls, and she was anonymously subscribed to pornographic mailing lists. She also received anonymous death threats and her neighbors received letters claiming that she had a venereal disease.

The same report mentioned that the GO was "investigating and attempting commitment procedures in line with the targets on Operation Dynamite." According to Cooper, who later reviewed the GO's files on her, this referred to an attempt to frame her for supposedly making bomb threats against the Church of Scientology. In December 1972, the New York Church of Scientology "received" two anonymous bomb threats. The following May, Cooper was indicted for making the bomb threats and arraigned for a Federal grand jury. Although the charges were dropped in 1975, it was not until 1977 that the FBI discovered that the bomb threats had been staged by the Guardian's Office.

=== Operation Devil's Wop ===
Operation Devil's Wop (April 7, 1977) was a GO covert operation against Senator Dennis DeConcini of Arizona, who was a supporter of anti-cult groups. Dick Weigand, the Deputy Guardian for Information US, ordered GO staff to prepare a report on DeConcini that would be leaked to the press to link him, falsely, with organized crime figures and questionable real estate deals. In June 1977, GO agent Michael Meisner was given the task of writing the report on account of his knowledge of the Washington, D.C., political scene and his previous dealings with the press.

=== Operation Fickle ===
Operation Fickle was a proposed plan to attack Eugene Patterson, editor and president of the St. Petersburg Times newspaper. The paper had been highly critical of Scientology for several years; in retaliation, the GO sought to discredit Patterson. According to GO official Randy Windment, Patterson had been nominated as the successor to Times Publishing Company owner Nelson Poynter, on condition that he would continue Poynter's policies. Windment proposed "to cast doubt upon Patterson and the actuality of his continuing" those policies so that Poynter would "separate Patterson from his source of power." A Scientologist operating under cover would interview Patterson's wife and elicit answers that could be construed to oppose Poynter and his policies. The interview would be given to an "enemy paper" to "cause both Patterson and Poynter to be the laughing stocks of the newspaper world." However, the operation was disapproved by Greg Willardson, the Deputy Guardian Information U.S:

I'm not at all certain this OP, even if done all the way through without bugs, would have enough of an affect [sic] to make it worth the resources expended. ... Would anyone really be interested in such a story, and if so I think that media person would check directly with Mrs. Patterson to discuss the 'controversy' at which point Mrs. Patterson would deny that she meant such and such and would say it was taken out of context and then the story would crumble.

=== Operation Freakout ===
Operation Freakout was a covert plan intended to have author and journalist Paulette Cooper imprisoned or committed to a psychiatric hospital. The plan, undertaken in 1976 following years of church-initiated lawsuits and covert harassment, was meant to eliminate the perceived threat that Cooper posed and obtain revenge for her publication in 1971 of a highly critical book, The Scandal of Scientology. The Federal Bureau of Investigation discovered documentary evidence of the plot and the preceding campaign of harassment during an investigation into the Church of Scientology in 1977, eventually leading to the church compensating Cooper in an out-of-court settlement.

=== Operation Funny Bone ===
The "Berry's World" cartoon from April 1977 that prompted Operation Funny Bone

Operation Funny Bone (April 28, 1977) was initiated in retaliation against syndicated newspaper cartoonist Jim Berry, who penned a cartoon that poked fun at Scientology and other fringe belief groups. L. Ron Hubbard ordered GO operative Dick Weigand to start an operation to "disenfranchise" Berry. The operation, as Weigand noted in a memo sent on May 28, 1977, "was done off a recent LRH order to myself, so needless to say I want the actions done fast." The objective of the operation was to "cause Jim Berry to lose his sindicated [sic] publication so that he can no longer SP [Suppressive Person] Scientology." The plan was to obtain back issues of the Berry's World cartoon and find particular cartoons that could be used by the GO to claim that Berry was a racist: "There should be many buttons of persons that are being pressed. e.g. a joke on Poles: a joke on Catholics: a joke on Jews: a joke on any ethnic groups: make a list of this person types or ethnics." Individual Scientologists were then to write to newspapers syndicating Berry's World to complain about the cartoons and asking them to drop Berry. They were also ordered to write to the leaders of ethnic groups urging them to protest about Berry's cartoons. There is no indication that the scheme was put into practice, although a Scientologist did contact Berry's syndicate to try to uncover information about the cartoonist. The details of the operation came to light after the planning documents were seized by the FBI in July 1977.

=== Operation Hydra ===
Operation Hydra was a Guardian's Office campaign to rid libraries across the United States of books and other literature that showed Scientology in a bad light. According to a former GO operative who participated in the campaign in Massachusetts, books were stolen from libraries across New England and hidden behind a false wall in the Scientology building in Boston. They were said to have been destroyed in 1977 along with incriminating documents about other GO activities following raids by the FBI against church offices in Los Angeles and Washington, D.C.

=== Operation Information ===
See § Operation Bunny Bust.

=== Operation Italian Fog ===
Operation Italian Fog was an attempt to smear Gabriel Cazares, the mayor of Clearwater, Florida, in order to "discredit" him and "weaken his power in his attacking actions at the [Scientology] Base." The plan was set out by Guardian's Office member Bruce Raymond in a letter of March 23, 1976 that stated:

The purpose of this op is to actually get real documentation into the files of Mexican license bureau or bureaux stating that the mayor got married in Mexico to some Mexican gal 25 years ago who is not his wife, so puts the mayor in a position of bigamy. This can be accomplished either by a bribe or a covert action. Once the docs are planted it is cleverly exposed that the mayor is promiscuous and a bigamist.

A plan of action was written on April 9, stating:

As part of the security, if a bribe is used data should be given to the person accepting the bribe to pinpoint a false Who in his mind, ideally one of the Mayor's known enemies so that if the Op gets blown up to the person who was bribed that person would give data on the planted Who and S. [Scientology] would never come up.

=== Operation Juicy Clanger ===
Operation Juicy Clanger targeted tax records of prominent politicians and celebrities. Scientology operatives infiltrated the Los Angeles offices of the IRS and stole confidential files on California's governor Jerry Brown, Los Angeles' mayor Tom Bradley, the singer Frank Sinatra and the actress Doris Day, as well as attempting to steal John Wayne's tax records. The church appears to have intended to blackmail the IRS; the operation envisaged the church pretending that it had received the stolen tax records from a whistleblower and threatening to release them to create what the plans described as "an additional pressure on [the IRS] to finish the audit [of Scientology tax matters] favorably".

=== Operation Keeler ===
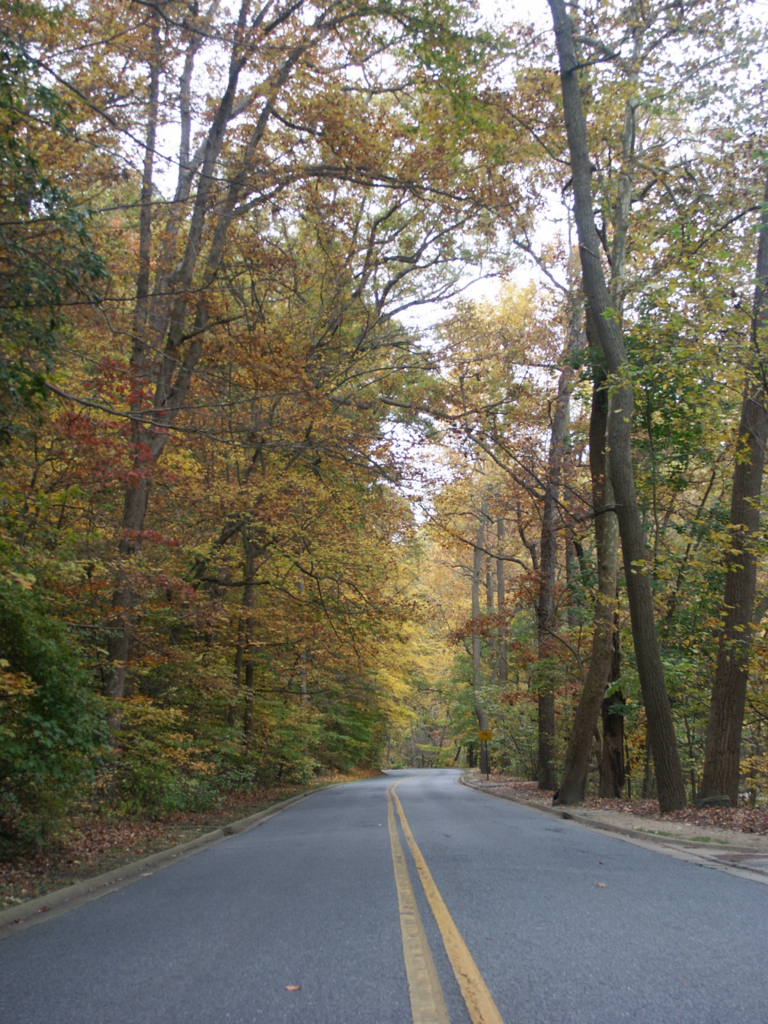
Rock Creek Park, Washington D.C., where Operation Keeler's fake road accident was staged

Operation Keeler was a bid to smear Gabriel Cazares, the mayor of Clearwater, Florida, by staging a fake road accident in Washington, D.C. while he was in the company of a young woman Scientologist. The intention was to manufacture a scandal that would derail Cazares' bid to win a seat in the United States House of Representatives. When the Guardian's Office discovered that Cazares would be attending a national mayors' conference in Washington between March 13–17, it put into place a plan to entrap the mayor in a staged scandal. A GO official informed Duke Snider, one of those later imprisoned on conspiracy charges, that he was "having DC put together fast a report on the upcoming conference primarily where it will be and when (in detail) and locate where Cazares will be staying. I am now working on a set of Ops [operations] type actions which could be done to welcome the mayor to the capital." The operation, codenamed "Op Keeler", was reported back to Mo Budlong by Dick Weigand, the Deputy Guardian Information US, in a letter of March 15, 1976:

[O]n either 13 March or 14 March, the Mayor picked up a young woman. On 14 March in the evening and after a few drinks, he had her take him for a ride on a dark and lonely road near D.C... Suddenly the car they were in struck a man at approximately 25 miles per hour. Neither the young woman or the Mayor stopped to help the man or even find out if he was dead or just seriously injured. The man who was hit is perfectly all right. The man has agreed to keep the matter totally quiet. ... I should think that the Mayor's political days are at an end.

Both of the other people involved in the "accident" in Rock Creek Park were Scientologists; the woman was a Scientologist agent named Sharon Thomas, and the man was Michael Meisner, who was later to play a key role in the Snow White scandal that eventually brought down the Guardian's Office. L. Ron Hubbard himself took a keen interest in Cazares and on the same day that Weigand's memo was sent, he sent a note to the GO: "Cazares - is there still some possibility the Cubans in Miami might get the idea he is pro-Castro?"

On June 21, 1976 Don Alverzo, director of Branch I information for the Scientology Flag Land Base in Clearwater, wrote to Weigand to inform him of the plans for the next phase of the operation – a smear campaign based on the fake accident. He wrote:

Attached is an op which I mocked up which should wreak havoc in and with Cazares' political machinery, and among the CW [Clearwater] people who support this criminal. ... [The plan is to write a letter] saying something to the following effect: "Gabe Cazares was involved in a scandal when he was in Wash DC with some floozy and also in a hit-and-run accident. The girl is going to turn herself into the police. We could have another Washington sex scandal on our hands unless we do something about it quickly."

The letter was to be written on "a safe typewriter" and mailed from Washington to leading Democrats in Pinellas County, as well as to the St. Petersburg Times, the Clearwater Sun, the Tampa Tribune, newspapers in the state capital Tallahassee and Channel 13 news. The letter was duly sent in August 1976, signed "Sharon T.", and said:

While driving around that night sightseeing with Gabe, we had an accident. We hit a man going around a sharp curve in the road and did not stop to see if he was hurt or even dead. I don't know why, I only know that I was scared to death and panicked - we both did.

A GO agent initially offered damaging information on Cazares to his opponent's administrative assistant but was rebuffed. The Assistant Guardian Information Flag wrote on August 2, 1976 that "Op Keeler is presently underway and is expected to start getting effects on Cazares in the next few days." The desired objective, he explained, was to force Cazares "into a 'glutz' situation of constantly defending himself and his actions, and removing all of his attack statements (about the church) from local media lines. Force him to spend his campaign funds for his defense, not for his offense." To cover its tracks, the GO sent an anonymous letter to Cazares' Republican opponent, Bill Young, claiming that the "Sharon T." letter was actually the work of the Cazares campaign and that he would claim it had been a dirty trick on Young's part. Young responded by turning the GO's letter over to the FBI, and Cazares likewise called in the FBI to investigate the smear campaign.

Cazares was defeated in the congressional race on November 2, 1976. After the GO's files became public in 1979, he sued the Church of Scientology for invasion of privacy and malicious prosecution. In August 1986, after six years of litigation, he won an out-of-court settlement.

=== Operation Kettle ===
Operation Kettle was one of a number of operations carried out against the American Medical Association, which had criticized Dianetics and Scientology on a number of occasions.

=== Operation Oscar ===
Operation Oscar (possibly alternatively known as the Oscar Program) was an operation carried out against Michael J. Flynn, a Boston attorney who was involved in a number of lawsuits against the Church of Scientology in the early 1980s. The operation sought to have Flynn disbarred and involved planting a Guardian's Office agent inside his law office for the purpose of gathering information.

=== Operation Orange Juice ===
Operation Orange Juice (GPgmO 1114, April 27, 1977) was a plan to attack Florida State Representative Frank Williams, who was sponsoring a Psychological Practices Bill which could have restricted the activities of Scientology in Florida. The GO suspected that Williams was "obviously being pushed by some mental health individual" behind the scenes. It sought to "locate the WHO pushing for the Bill being made legislation, identify the Bill with the individual and take out the individual. This will result in the Bill being killed." Individual Scientologists were to be used to operate in the guise of concerned professionals affected by the bill, who would lobby against its enactment and try to find out who was behind it. When the "John Doe" was found, "any and all crimes and embarrassing points" were to be uncovered in a bid to discredit him or it. Religious groups such as the "Baptists, Christian Scientists, Episcopalians, Methodists, Lutherans, Mormons, Jehovas Witnesses" and so on were to be contacted and urged to "send steaming letters to their representatives from all over Florida to kill the "Doe" Bill."

=== Operation Paris ===
Operation Paris aimed to identify individual IRS officials working on Scientology tax matters and investigate their background and activities. A 'plant' would be recruited to develop social and political contacts with IRS personnel.

=== Operation Paste Up ===
Operation Paste Up was a campaign against mental health organizations, carried out with the use of front groups to stage demonstrations and stick up posters outside mental health facilities. The plan sought to create the appearance that many different groups across the United States were protesting, but specified that the protests were not to be linked with Scientology. One such protest took place outside a Utah hospital on December 13, 1969.

=== Operation Random Harvest ===
Operation Random Harvest sought to document criminal activity on the part of the IRS.

=== Operation Rook ===
Operation Rook was a GO campaign against the Better Business Bureau of Phoenix, Arizona at the start of the 1970s. According to one of the documents seized by the FBI from the Guardian's Office in 1977, the successes of Operation Rook included "successfully obtain[ing] Phoenix BBB file on Scientology and Arizona Republic Newspaper file on Scientology".

=== Operation Search and Destroy ===
Operation Search and Destroy targeted organizations and individuals providing information to the Internal Revenue Service. The GO would use overt or covert means to obtain information which could be used to discredit them, while avoiding any disclosure of Scientology's involvement. The GO had already obtained information on IRS informants and sought to expand its coverage.

=== Operation Shake and Bake ===
Operation Shake and Bake was a plan targeting LaVenda Van Schaick, an ex-Scientologist who left the church in 1979. According to Van Schaick, supposedly confidential personal information that she had divulged as part of Scientology counselling was used in an attempt to blackmail her. She also reported that her home and telephone had been bugged and an attempt had been made to break up her marriage by telling her that her husband had had affairs with other women.

=== Operation Shell Game ===
A plan possibly called Operation Shell Game was promulgated in February 1977 by GO official Mo Budlong in an order sent to the Deputy Guardian Information Canada. It ordered Canadian GO staff to locate the papers of the former director of the World Health Organization, Dr. Brock Chisholm. A Scientologist "using a suitable guise" was to review the papers and obtain copies of anything to do with Scientology or L. Ron Hubbard. Budlong ordered that current World Federation of Mental Health members were to be checked "in any way suitable" to see whether they might have any similar papers, and "If files are discovered, obtain them."

=== Operation Smoke ===
Operation Smoke was an infiltration campaign carried out against the American Cancer Society, which had issued an alert in October 1966 warning that it had "found no evidence that treatment with the E-meter results in any objective benefits in the treatment of cancer in human beings." In 1973, the GO initiated Operation Smoke "to see how much ACS has been doing against Scn [Scientology] ... indications fairly active .. At this time we have operatives in their national headquarters (N.Y.) and in the following states: Massachusetts, Nevada, Cal. -- which should provide ample information."

=== Operation Snapper ===
Operation Snapper was a plot in 1976 to discredit Lawrence Tapper, the deputy attorney general in charge of the charitable trust unit in the California Attorney General's office, who had handled consumer fraud complaints against the Church of Scientology during the 1970s. The Guardian's Office intended to frame Tapper with a pregnant woman, a fake nun and a fictional bribery kickback to get him "removed from his post in the AG's office so that he can no longer commit overts [sins]" against Scientology.

The operation was divided into three "channels", each of which had several "phases". The first phase of channel one instructed:

Recruit a very tough (woman) that is obviously pregnant and that is a good actress... she does a practice run on the AG's office to ascertain the best place in [Evelle] Younger's office [the former attorney general] to do the action. Pregnant woman simply walks into the AG's office in Sacramento and says in so many words: 'I told Larry I wouldn't do this but he gave me no choise [sic]. I don't care about his career anymore! I mean look at me! I'll go to the press even if it does ruin my family's reputation. I won't have an abortion!'" After creating a scene and crying, the woman was to leave, saying, "Oh, never mind, nobody will help me anyway."

In the second phase:

Recruit trusted male... must be able to talk angerly [sic] and sound about 45 to 50 years old over the phone. "He is the father of the pregnant girl. He calls up the two areas his daughter visited and gives them hell (from an outside phone), says, 'My daughter came into your office yesterday. The pregnant girl. Well, I don't know what you people said to her but she is terrified... talks of suicide... this guy is Larry Tapper. Who is he? My daughter tells me he is the father of her child. And he's threatened to have her committed if she reveals this... You can only protect basterds [sic] like Tapper for so long and then you'll get a Watergate.'

The second channel would commence five days later, requiring the GO to "Recruit a trusted female with a lot of courage. Find out what's the biggest order of nuns in the area, and what habit they would be wearing during this season... Recruit a reliable person who can actually take professional photograph [sic] indoors." The "nun" would go into the Attorney General's office and ask about filing a complaint. The "photographer" would follow her and "overhear" her question, and would make her "admit" that she wanted to complain about Tapper. The "photographer" would start taking pictures of the "nun": "Nun covers her face completely. She says please don't. No! Oh God. I shouldn't have come here. Nun leaves very upset. Photographer asks receptionist who was that... and leaves." In the second phase, a Scientologist posting as a journalist would go to the office and ask questions such as "Is it true a nun came in here yesterday and accused Younger of protecting Lawrence Tapper... Any statement on this. Is Younger protecting Tapper on this? What's it all about?" The pictures taken by the "photographer" would be sent to newspapers to elicit headlines "something like 'Mysterious Nun Claims Prejudice in AG's office.' GET ARTICLE PUBLISHED. The article will cast aspersions on the charity fraud area and Tapper."

In the final channel, GO staff were instructed:

Find out where Tapper banks... Obtain the name and address of the San Diego Mental Health's executive who just got busted for dealing in drugs. Recruit a 30-year old tough looking male... He will be taking five $20 bills ($100) and depositing them into Tapper's account. He'll ensure no prints of his are on any papers... He should wear glasses and some sort of hat so he can't be recognized again... He reports back with receipt.

Another Scientology agent posing as a banker was to deliver the receipt to Younger's office, implicating Tapper for receiving "payoffs from some rather strange areas." According to the planning documents for the operation, "The above channel workable [sic] is derived from the fact that Younger has been involved with bad PR concerning bankers and banks. This should... have Younger put a lot of attention on this caper."

At least some of Operation Snapper was put into effect. The GO documents about the operation were among the files seized by the FBI in June 1977 but it was not until February 1980 that Operation Snapper became public knowledge, when a group called the Citizens Freedom Foundation discovered the planning documents among the files that had been released in the aftermath of the convictions of the GO's leadership. When Henrietta Crampton of the CFF told Tapper about the documents that her group had uncovered, "he was quiet for a moment, and then he asked if it had anything to do with a pregnant woman. I told him it did and that I had it in writing. He said, 'You've made my weekend," and asked me to send him copies." Tapper made no further comment, as he and Attorney General Younger were being sued for allegedly illegally infiltrating the Church of Scientology.

Heber Jentzsch, the Los Angeles Church of Scientology's director of public relations, argued that the plot was merely "unauthorized pranks of which we have no evidence were ever carried out." He told the Los Angeles Herald Examiner that he had "heard of the 'Snapper' operation. It was a gross operation. I can't condone that kind of activity... Someone obviously got frustrated and decided to carry out their own scenario. It should never have happened."

=== Operation Snow White ===
Operation Snow White was a criminal conspiracy during the 1970s to purge unfavorable records about Scientology and L. Ron Hubbard from 136 government agencies, foreign embassies and consulates, as well as private organizations critical of Scientology, in more than 30 countries. It was one of the largest infiltrations of the United States government in history, with up to 5,000 covert scientologist agents who committed infiltration, wiretapping, and theft of documents in government offices, most notably those of the U.S. Internal Revenue Service. Eleven highly placed executives, including Mary Sue Hubbard (third wife of L. Ron Hubbard and second-in-command of the Guardian's Office), pleaded guilty and were convicted in federal court of obstructing justice, burglary of government offices, and theft of documents and government property.

=== Operation Sore Throat ===
Operation Sore Throat was a major campaign mounted against the American Medical Association. Several Scientologist agents were infiltrated into the AMA as employees, one of whom gained access to meetings of the AMA's board of directors. In June 1975, the AMA found itself repeatedly embarrassed by leaks of confidential documents to the press by an unknown source who called himself "Sore Throat" – a punning reference to Deep Throat of Watergate scandal fame. The documents disclosed the AMA's political activities and liaison with the pharmaceutical industry, including lobbying for nominees to federal appointments and details of financial transactions between drug companies and the AMA's political arm.

"Sore Throat" claimed to be "a doctor who worked in the A.M.A.'s Chicago office for about ten years" who had become discontent with the AMA's policies and moved to Washington, DC. In reality, he was Scientologist agent Michael Meisner, who was later to be a key witness for the US Government against the Guardian's Office leadership.

The leaks led to the AMA being investigated by the Internal Revenue Service, the US Postal Service, a number of Congressional committees, Ralph Nader and the press. The AMA's internal leak investigation ultimately pointed to the Church of Scientology being behind the leaks. A GO memorandum of May 16, 1977 explained the circumstances of the investigation: "3 agents got placed in 2 AMA offices. It fell apart in Oct. '75 when the DC missionaire (a church official) leaked data to the press which identified one of the agents. The AMA called in a firm of investigators who blew the Chicago agent ... and then traced a connection to the DC agents."

Two secretaries in the AMA's Washington office were discovered to be Scientologists, one working under an assumed name. Sherry Canavarro, a secretary in the AMA's Chicago office, was also found to be a Scientologist and was given a lie detector test. Although she passed, confidential minutes from the AMA's board of directors were found in her desk and she was determined to have spent several unexplained weekends at work. She subsequently resigned. When the FBI investigated the case, it discovered that Canavarro also used the names "Sherry Hermann" and "Sandy Cooper" and held the post of Pacific Secretary of the Guardian Office United States. Although Canavarro escaped legal charges, her husband Mitchell Hermann was subsequently convicted on conspiracy charges and was imprisoned.

Operation Sore Throat was masterminded at a high level within the Guardian's Office, as the US Government's sentencing memorandum in United States of America v. Jane Kember, Morris Budlong documented. Kember, the Guardian Worldwide, sent a cover story to Deputy Guardian US Henning Heldt: "David [Gaiman] has laid down a strategy which is to enable us to contain the scene. Our plants when trapped are Freedom investigative reporters just like any other newspaper. The plants themselves do not have to confess or be named ... We can undercut AMA's continual effort to expose us by indicating it is a smokescreen to prevent Freedom from publishing."

The AMA accused the Church of Scientology of being behind "Sore Throat" but Scientology spokesman denied responsibility, accusing the AMA of "grasping in the dark to cover their own crimes." Even after the GO's role was exposed, Scientology spokesmen defended the leaker's actions: ""Whoever 'Sore Throat' was should get a medal," Jeffery Dubron told the Los Angeles Times. "I don't know who that person was ... If this person went in and lied to get a job in the AMA and exposed crimes and created change, should that person be prosecuted for his or her actions?"

In addition to the "Sore Throat" campaign, the GO carried out a series of burglaries of law firms working for the AMA. The offices of law firms Sidley & Austin were burglarized by two Scientologists in 1976 who copied legally sensitive AMA files after carrying out a 90-minute search.

=== Operation Strike ===
Operation Strike was a covert campaign which GO staffer Kathy Gregg defined in an October 1971 memo as "the action of gathering information on a covert basis." She listed a twelve-point plan of action on how to do so, ranging from acquiring squeakless shoes to establishing a "safe reading place" if stolen files could not be removed from the target location.

=== Operation Yellow ===
Operation Yellow (1976) was a plan to discredit critics of Scientology in Clearwater, Florida - and in particular the mayor, Gabriel Cazares - by making them "seem to be Fascists, commie haters, and bigots." This was to be done by sending an anonymous letter to all downtown Clearwater businesses, particularly "ALL the Jewish ones." GO national operations officer Bruce Raymond wrote a draft letter which read:

"Fellow Clearwaterians (check spell)

"God bless the Mayor. He is a true Christian and the entire town should be proud of him. He has stood up against un-Christian Scientology and God is obviously with him.

"On the Scientology issues, the Mayor is right. We back him all the way. But what we should also do is make sure no more undesirables move into Clearwater.

"We kept the Miami Jews from moving in and turning beautiful Clearwater into Miami Beach. The blacks in Clearwater are decent and know their place ..."

=== Other operations ===
==== McLeans ====
A series of operations was carried out by the Guardian's Office against the McLean family of Sutton, Ontario, who had defected en masse from Scientology in the early 1970s. An order was issued against them in February 1973; two years later in March 1975, a US Deputy Guardian described how the GO's Branch 4 (B4) "is trying to discredit [Eric] McLean to his next-door neighbors but the only possible beneficial result of that action that would help us is if McLean is ridden out of town on a rail, and 'the public' are notoriously apathetic about doing this even when the 'proof' (sic) is exposed, much less what B4 Canada are doing." The Deputy Guardian was critical of the operation and called for it to be revised. Another document from May 1973 reported that the GO had planted an agent in the McLean household and instructed him to look for weaknesses in family relationships that could be exploited so that "this crowd ... would start to break up."

==== Mark Sableman ====
An operation with an unknown codename was planned against Mark Sableman, a reporter for the Clearwater Sun newspaper. On January 26, 1976 a Guardian's Office operative named Joe Lisa proposed a plan that included:

Have a woman (elderly) go into the office and in grief and misemotion (sic) start screaming she wants to see Sableman's boss. She goes in and sees this man and screams and cries about Sableman sexually assaulting her son, or grandson. The woman takes a magazine which is lurid and perverted and throws it into the face of the man/woman and screams 'Look what he gave my son, not to mention what the pervert did ... sob, sob, to my Johnny. I'm going to the police. If you can't do something about that pervert Sableman I will see they do something to you.'

== Programs ==
=== Program Billy's Baby ===
Program Billy's Baby was intended to discredit an official of the American Medical Association by having a Scientologist rehearsed in playing the role of the official's girlfriend. The aim of the operation was to cause a scandal by claiming that she had become pregnant by him. In one GO document, a GO official wrote: "I recruited a tough OT (operating thetan) female with lots of intention who could act out a few dramatic phone calls ... I drilled the FSM (field staff member) so she had the patter exactly as written and could mock up grief, drugged, slurred voice."

=== Program: Humanist Humiliation ===
Program: Humanist Humiliation was a 1977 plan by the Guardian's Office to silence the Committee for Scientific Investigation of Claims of the Paranormal (CSICOP, now known as the Committee for Skeptical Inquiry) and "handle terminatedly the Humanist publication Zetetic and the Committee for Scientific Investigation of Claims of the Paranormal so that they never attack Scientology or Dianetics again." The 23-point order instructed GO members to spread the rumor that CSICOP was a CIA front organization set up "to discredit any and all psychic phenomena in order to keep this subject under CIA control and in order to squash paranormal research outside the CIA." The GO obtained CIA stationery on which it forged letters which were to be sent to journalists with a track record of writing on intelligence matters.

The program also included sending letters to known anti-Scientologist members of CSICOP, aiming to solicit replies that were "anti-religious and state that the committee might also look into Christian claims, etc." These replies were to be leaked to the "press, Catholic and Protestant religious leaders, and religious newspapers" as part of a strategy to "keep pushing the rumour to keep our enemies involved in a conflict with conventional religion. Get religious leaders steamed up by ringing them as concerned members of their religious communities, or as reporters, or whatever."

The order for Humanist Humiliation was issued by Herman Brandel, an aide to Mary Sue Hubbard, the Controller of the Guardian's Office. The plan was duly carried out; the forged CIA memo was sent to the New York Times, the investigative journalist Jack Anderson and others. According to CSICOP's chairman Paul Kurtz, at least one critic of the committee claimed in print that it was connected with the CIA. The Scientology offensive was carried out shortly after the CSICOP magazine Zetetic ran an article on Dianetics and Scientology by British sociologist Roy Wallis.

=== Other programs ===
- Guardian Program Order 283, promulgated by Jane Kember, ordered the infiltration of the United Nations to provide feedback on a submission which Scientology intended to make to the UN.
- Guardian Program Order 1017, entitled "ARM Clean Sweep", called for "covert agents" for "data collection lines" (i.e. to covertly gather information) with anti-cult groups, which Scientology called the "Anti-Religious Movement" (ARM). The GO planned to set up a kidnapping to frame Michael Trauscht, a noted deprogammer. GO member Henning Heldt issued an order to set up a "covert op" which would lead to "the arrest of IFIF/IFFET [two anti-Scientology groups] principals and discrediting of ARM as a result." As a result of the operation, false documents were planted in the organisations' files purporting to show that they had conducted illegal activities. Heldt also proposed planting drugs and illegal weapons.
- Guardian Program Order 1238 ordered GO staff to "obtain the information necessary to take over the control of NIMH (National Institute of Mental Health) while at the same time establishing the lines and resources to be used in taking over NIMH." It also called for the infiltration of the US Public Health Service, the Food and Drug Administration, and the Alcohol, Drug Abuse, and Mental Health Administration (ADAMHA).

== Projects ==
Projects were sub-plans of wider intelligence operations. The following provide a number of examples from the 1970s.

=== Project Beetle Cleanup ===
Project Beetle Cleanup called for the theft of "all DC IRS files on LRH, Scientology, etc., in the Intelligence section, OIO [Office of International Operations], and SSS [Special Services Staff]". It ordered the placement of agents in the "required areas or good access developed".

=== Project Horn ===
Project Horn was a plan to covertly release stolen documents without revealing the thieves' identity. The records of other taxpayers would be stolen and released along with those of the Church of Scientology. A GO operative within the IRS was instructed to steal letterheaded stationery from the agency so that letters could be forged in the name of a non-existent whistleblower supposedly responsible for the leaks. The operative did so and also stole tax records for Bob Jones University and the Unification Church.

=== Project Lantern ===
Project Lantern (May 26, 1974) was a plan to destroy the international police organisation Interpol. Developed in support of L. Ron Hubbard's Snow White Project in the mid-1970s, it was "designed to investigate and develope [sic] all known avenues of possible attack to wipe Interpol out of existance [sic]. MAJOR TARGET: To completely destroy Interpol". A memo setting out the project's goals claimed that by "collecting and distributing false reports on Scientology and LRH [L. Ron Hubbard], the General Secretariat [of Interpol] has violated it [sic] Constitution", notably the prohibition on undertaking "any intervention or activities of a political, military, religious or racial character".

=== Project Normandy ===
Project Normandy (December 5, 1975) was a plan devised as part of a planned takeover of the city of Clearwater, Florida in the mid-1970s. Its stated purpose was to "obtain enough data on the Clearwater area to be able to determine what groups and individuals [we] will need to penetrate and handle in order to establish area control." The project's "major target" was to "fully investigate the Clearwater city and county area so we can distinguish our friends from our enemies and handle as needed." Among the individuals and organizations listed as targets were Clearwater's City Commission, the City Health Department, the City Mental Hygiene Department, the City Licensing Department, the City Police Department, the City Consumer Affairs Office, the City Attorney, similar offices in Pinellas County and the State of Florida, the local Representative to the US Congress, Florida's US Senators, local media companies, all local financial institutions and pharmaceutical companies.

=== Project Owl ===
Project Owl (June 1976) was a plan to infiltrate the Suffolk County District Attorney's Office in response to a planned investigation of the Church of Scientology for criminal fraud and of one of its members for kidnapping.

=== Project Quaker ===
Project Quaker was a plan to hide Guardian's Office staff in Washington, D.C. from law enforcement agencies seeking to question them. The planning documents stated: "It may be deemed necessary for all the DC staff who could be pulled in for questioning to suddenly leave. US B-1 SEC is to insure that all concerned are ready to leave at any time and that all cycles - finance, 2D (relationships), bills, are completely up to P.T. (Present Time) and there no PTPs (Present Time Problems) or stops to immediate departure." A GO staffer in Clearwater, Florida was ordered to "immediately do up a confidential s-w (Staff Work) for finances for this project. This is for seven or eight people so the amount should be about $10,000.00 for staffers."

=== Project Taco-Less ===
Project Taco-Less (1976) was a plan to release "further data about the Mayor" of Clearwater, Gabriel Cazares, to "ruin his political career and remove/restrain him as an opponent to Scn [Scientology].".

=== Project Troy ===
Project Troy was aimed "to get prediction on future IRS actions" by planting a permanent bugging device in the office of the IRS Chief Counsel. Information acquired by eavesdropping would be used to brief the church's lawyers to mount defensive actions.

=== Project Witch ===
Project Witch, a sub-project of the overarching Snow White Program, targeted the UK Aliens Office, the Immigration Office, UK Interpol, the Royal Navy and the Department of Health and Social Security. The Metropolitan Police Service was also targeted in a bid to obtain a Scotland Yard file on Scientology and to sue the Metropolitan Police Commissioner over it.
