= Project Normandy =

Scientology operation to take over Clearwater

Project Normandy was a top secret Church of Scientology operation wherein the church planned to take over the city of Clearwater, Florida, by infiltrating government offices and media centers. Gabe Cazares, who was the mayor of Clearwater at the time, used the term "the occupation of Clearwater" and later characterized it as a "paramilitary operation by a terrorist group".

== History ==
In the 1970s, the Church of Scientology Corporation used a front group, called the "United Churches of Florida", to purchase the Fort Harrison Hotel for $3 million. The church established their headquarters in the Fort Harrison Hotel, and dubbed it their Flag Land Base.

In 1977, an FBI raid on Scientology headquarters uncovered internal Church of Scientology documents marked "Top Secret" that referred to their secret operation to take over Clearwater as "Project Normandy". The document states its purpose as "obtain[ing] enough data on the Clearwater area to be able to determine what groups and individuals B1 will need to penetrate and handle in order to establish area control". The document says its "Major Target" is "to fully investigate the Clearwater city and county area so we can distinguish our friends from our enemies and handle as needed".

On November 3, 1979, the Clearwater Sun ran an article with the headline "Scientologists plot city takeover" and later stories claimed that the Scientologists also had international plans to take over the world. The St. Petersburg Times won a Pulitzer Prize for one of their stories that exposed some of the criminal wrongdoings of the Church of Scientology. Cazares also noted that he found it odd that a religious group would resort to using code names for a project to take control of a town, and called the project a "paramilitary operation by a terrorist group".

The Church of Scientology targeted Cazares, attempting to entrap him in a sex scandal. Scientology also staged a phony hit-and-run accident with Cazares in an attempt to discredit him. Cazares and his wife sued the Church of Scientology for $1.5 million. The church settled with Cazares in 1986.

== See also ==
- Clearwater Hearings
- Gabe Cazares
- List of Guardian's Office operations
