= David Gaiman =

British Scientologist leader

- Born: 10 June 1933; Portsmouth, England
- Died: 7 March 2009 (aged 75)
- Education: Portsmouth Grammar School
- Occupations: Owner, G&G Foods, East Grinstead; Public Relations Director, Church of Scientology (ret.)
- Spouse: Sheila (m. 1959)
- Children: 3, including Neil Gaiman

David Bernard Gaiman (10 June 1933 – 7 March 2009) was a British businessman and head of the UK branch of Church of Scientology. He and his wife Sheila joined Scientology in the early 1960s and Gaiman served as public relations director and was frequently in the media during the British controversies over Scientology in the 1960s and 1970s.

== Family and public career ==
Gaiman's family is of Polish-Jewish origins; after emigrating from the Netherlands in 1916, his father eventually settled in the Hampshire city of Portsmouth on the south coast of England and established a chain of grocery stores. Born in 1933, Gaiman was educated at The Portsmouth Grammar School, though he did not excel academically. He subsequently joined the British Army where he rose to the rank of sergeant. He returned to Portsmouth on leaving the army to work for his father in the grocery stores, though he detested this job.

He married Sheila on 1 March 1959. He eventually decided to go into business for himself, much to his father's displeasure, and the family moved away from their home in Portchester in 1962.

When the Gaimans discovered Scientology, they moved to East Grinstead, West Sussex, in 1965. David Gaiman joined the staff of the Church of Scientology at nearby Saint Hill Manor, eventually becoming the church's chief UK media spokesman.

Gaiman had three children, a son and two daughters: fantasy author Neil Gaiman, Claire Edwards, head of Scientology Missions International, and Lizzy Calcioli.

== Guardian's Office ==
He joined the Guardian's Office (GO), the Church's public relations bureau / intelligence agency. In 1969, Gaiman was involved in an attempt by the Church to take over the National Association for Mental Health (now Mind), a British mental health charity. Some 300 Scientologists joined the group and nominated Gaiman, among others, for high office. Gaiman was nominated for the Chairmanship. Eventually, the Scientologists were asked to resign but contested that request in court. Scientologists also held demonstrations for, according to Gaiman, "humane treatment and a bill of rights for mental patients and the protection of their bodies and their well-being. We want an independent inquiry into conditions in mental hospitals. We want no more whitewashing from certain mental health organisations like the one across the road. Our stand is not on being asked to resign but for humane psychiatry."

In the 1970s, he became Deputy Guardian for Public Relations World Wide and Minister of Public Affairs for the Churches of Scientology Worldwide, as well as serving as public spokesman.

According to documents in the US vs Kember and Budlong case, Gaiman issued an order in 1975 for an operation to put false information in US security agency computers using planted agents. It was known as 'Operation Cat'. Kember also credited Gaiman with the strategy to claim that CoS plants inside the American Medical Association were reporters for Freedom magazine.

He rose to become the head of GO Public Relations and was a member of the powerful Watchdog Committee. In 1981, he was promoted to the position of Guardian (i.e. head of the Guardian's Office), replacing Jane Kember following her criminal conviction for conspiracy against the US Government (she had been part of Scientology's Operation Snow White). Later that year, a rival faction within Scientology led by David Miscavige ousted Gaiman from power. Years later, the church accused him of sexual misconduct and putting himself above Scientologist founder L. Ron Hubbard and subsequently sent Gaiman to the Rehabilitation Project Force.

== Vitamin shop and later life ==
In 1965, David and Sheila Gaiman co-founded a vitamin shop, G&G Vitamins. In 1987, G&G moved to larger premises and began to manufacture its own label vitamins for the first time. Sheila stands today as one of the longest serving members of the Royal Pharmaceutical Society of Great Britain. In April 2009, they appointed Myles McEntyre as Managing Director to run G&G on a day-to-day basis. The Gaimans were prominent figures in the local community and well known for their sponsorship of the local arts scene. Gaiman was also a trustee of Greenfield's School from its formation in the 1980s.

Gaiman took part in the inaugural London Marathon, in 1981, and came joint last.

On 7 March 2009, Gaiman had a heart attack during a business meeting, and died at the age of 75. A memorial service, attended by hundreds, was held for him at Saint Hill Manor, East Grinstead, and, on 12 March 2009, his Jewish funeral service was held in Brighton.

== See also ==
- Believe What You Like
