= Gabe Cazares =

American mayor (1920–2006)

Gabriel "Gabe" Cazares
- Gabe Cazares at a rally

Mayor of Clearwater, Florida
- In office 1975–1978
- Preceded by: H. Everett Hougen
- Succeeded by: Charles F. LeCher
- Constituency: Clearwater, Florida

Pinellas County Commissioner
- In office 1980–1984
- Succeeded by: George Greer
- Constituency: Pinellas County, Florida

Personal details
- Born: January 31, 1920 Alpine, Texas
- Died: September 29, 2006 (aged 86) Clearwater, Florida
- Party: Democratic

Gabriel Cazares (January 31, 1920 – September 29, 2006) was a mayor of Clearwater, Florida, a Pinellas County commissioner, a civil rights advocate, and a critic of the Church of Scientology. He died in Clearwater at the age of 86.

== Early life ==
Cazares was born to Mexican parents on 31 January 1920, in Alpine, Texas, as one of nine children. His family moved to Los Angeles, where he worked in the Civilian Conservation Corps. He attended Los Angeles City College on a track scholarship, where he set a record for the junior college 2-mile run which stood for 11 years. He also attended Fresno State College and Texas Christian University, where he earned his Bachelor of Arts degree in sociology, and the University of Maryland, College Park. He received his master's degree in business management from Jackson College in Honolulu, Hawaii. Much of his college work was complete while he was in the military. He joined the Army Air Forces in 1941 three weeks after the attacks on Pearl Harbor and rose to the rank of lieutenant colonel.

== Political career ==
Cazares retired from military service in 1966 to become a stockbroker. He moved to Clearwater, Florida soon afterwards and became a social activist, campaigning for desegregation and improved housing for minorities.

In 1975, Cazares was elected mayor by a margin of fewer than 500 votes in a campaign that he entered as an underdog. His resounding victory was noteworthy because he was a Democrat and Hispanic in a largely Republican city then home to few Hispanics. He was a somewhat controversial mayor, frequently clashing with his colleagues on the City Commission and alienating important Democrats in the local political establishment. Nonetheless he gained popularity for his campaigning on behalf of the city's elderly population and the increasing openness he brought to City Hall.

He twice ran unsuccessfully for Congress, in 1976 against U.S. Rep. C. W. Bill Young, R-Indian Shores, and in 1986 against Rep. Mike Bilirakis, R-Tarpon Springs.

Cazares resigned as mayor in 1978, but was elected county commissioner in 1980. He held that post until Republican George Greer defeated him in 1984. Greer would later receive national attention as the judge in the controversial Terri Schiavo case. In 1991, Cazares was elected to the Common Cause National Governing Board.

His 1998 complaint that Taco Bell's television advertisements featuring a Spanish speaking Chihuahua dog were offensive and demeaning to Mexicans and Mexican-Americans, gained attention in the newspapers.

In 2005 he criticized CNN for cutting away from Florida Governor Jeb Bush's speech just as he began to repeat a warning about Hurricane Wilma in Spanish - after the warning in English. Cazares called it dangerously insensitive to Florida's large Spanish speaking population.

== Criticism of Scientology ==
=== Investigation of church ===
Cazares became an outspoken critic of Scientology after the church decided in 1975 to move major operations into Clearwater. Cazares was suspicious of the group, which was buying property under the name "United Churches of Florida." The church leaders told Cazares that they were an ecumenical group that planned to improve the ethics and morality in the Clearwater area. Cazares wondered why church folks from Los Angeles, California, would travel all the way to Florida to provide Clearwater with moral guidance. Cazares investigated the United Churches of Florida and discovered that the leaders of the group lied about their intentions. They told Cazares they were renting the historic Fort Harrison Hotel from a group called Southern Land Development Leasing Corporation. Cazares discovered that both groups were controlled by Scientologists.

=== Lawsuit by Church of Scientology ===
Cazares was sued by the Church of Scientology for $1 million after he said that the city was being taken over. Cazares' suspicions about the group were investigated by local newspapers. On 3 November 1979, the Clearwater Sun ran a headline "Scientologists plot city takeover" and later stories said that the Scientologists had plans to take over the world. The St. Petersburg Times won a Pulitzer Prize for one story exposing the wrongdoings of the Church of Scientology. A 1977 FBI raid on three Scientology headquarters uncovered internal documents marked "Top Secret" that referred to their operation to take over Clearwater as "Project Normandy". The FBI uncovered information about "Operation Freakout," an operation intended to get Scientology critic Paulette Cooper committed to a mental hospital. The raid revealed "Operation Snow White," where the Church of Scientology planned to infiltrate federal and state government offices in order to steal documents which reflected negatively on Church founder L. Ron Hubbard, or the Church of Scientology. The raid resulted in the convictions of 11 top leaders of the church. Cazares said it was odd that a religious group would use code names for a project to take control of a town, and called the project a "paramilitary operation by a terrorist group."

=== Harassment by the Church ===
The Church of Scientology planned to smear Cazares. Cazares questioned the church's motives, its purchases of downtown property using fictitious names, and the way its security guards carried Billy clubs and mace. At the Church of Scientology, federal investigators found internal memos outlining plans by church leaders to control public opinion in Clearwater, concoct a sex smear campaign against Cazares and infiltrate the local media and other institutions called the "Mayor Cazares Handling Project" and "Speedy Gonzalez". These Scientology documents also revealed that church members had staged a false hit-and-run accident with Cazares in an attempt to discredit him.

Cazares and his wife sued the Church of Scientology for $1.5 million. The church settled with Cazares in 1986.

Political offices
Preceded by H. Everett Hougen	Mayor of Clearwater, Florida; 1975 – 1978	Succeeded by Charles F. LeCher
Preceded by Unknown	County Commissioner, Pinellas County, Florida; 1980 – 1984	Succeeded by George Greer
