= United States v. Hubbard =

1978 United States criminal court case

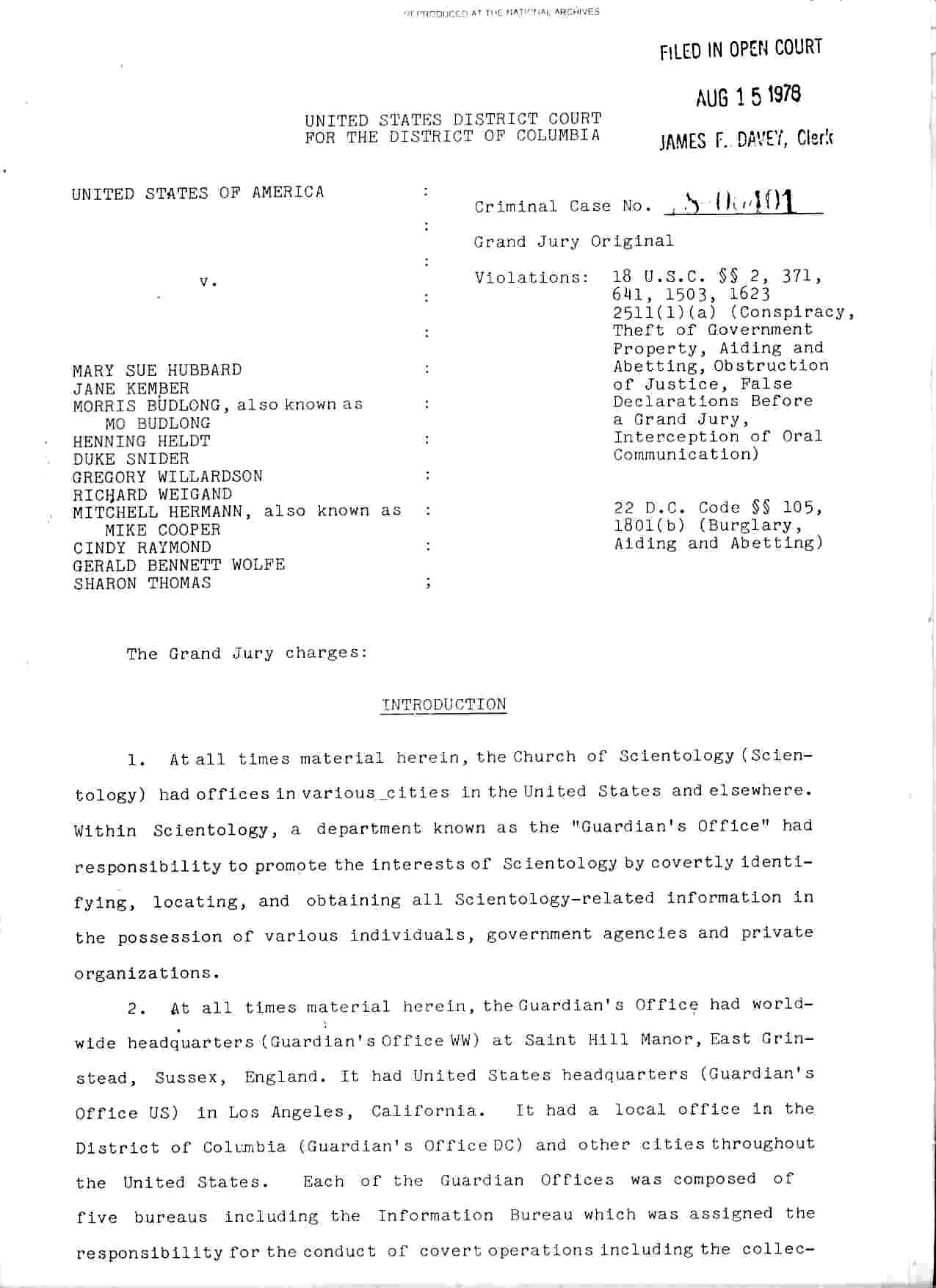
- 1978 grand jury indictment
- Court: United States District Court for the District of Columbia

United States v. Hubbard was the federal criminal case arising from Operation Snow White, a Church of Scientology conspiracy to infiltrate government offices and steal or remove records considered unfavorable to the Church and its founder, L. Ron Hubbard. In 1978, a grand jury indicted 11 church members, including Mary Sue Hubbard. The defendants were convicted on various charges, including conspiracy, burglary, and theft of government property. All eleven defendants were found guilty and sentenced to both fines and imprisonment. The convictions were upheld on appeal.

== Charges ==
The charges included violating various laws including:

U.S.C. 18 §§ 2 (Aiding and Abetting), 371 (Conspiracy), 641 (Theft of Govt Property), 1503 (Obstruction of Justice), 1623 (False Declarations before a Grand Jury), and 2511(1)(a) (Interception of Oral Communication). Also included was 22 D.C. Code §§ 105, 1801(b) (Burglary, Aiding and Abetting).

== Defendants ==
List from Grand Jury document.

- Mary Sue Hubbard
- Jane Kember
- Morris Budlong
- Henning Heldt
- Duke Snider
- Gregory Willardson
- Richard Weigand
- Mitchell Hermann aka Mike Cooper
- Cindy Raymond
- Gerald Bennett Wolfe
- Sharon Thomas

== Result ==
A series of sentencing orders dated Dec. 11, 1979 show some of the results of the trial.

Defendant	Charge	Prison time	Fine
Morris Budlong	Burglary, Aiding and Abetting	2–6 years	
Henning Heldt	Conspiracy	4 years	$10,000
Mitchell Hermann	Conspiracy	4 years	$10,000
Jane Kember	Burglary, Aiding and Abetting	2–6 years	
Cindy Raymond	Conspiracy	5 years	$10,000
Mary Sue Hubbard	Conspiracy	5 years	$10,000
Duke Snider	Conspiracy	4 years	$10,000
Sharon Thomas	Theft of Government Property	1 year (6 months served); 5 years probation	$1,000
Richard Weigand	Conspiracy	4 years	$10,000
Gregory Willardson	Conspiracy	4 years	$10,000
Gerald Bennett Wolfe	Conspiracy	5 years	$10,000

== See also ==
- Operation Snow White
- Operation Freakout
- List of Guardian's Office operations
- Scientology and the legal system
