= Operation Freakout =

Scientology plot to frame Paulette Cooper

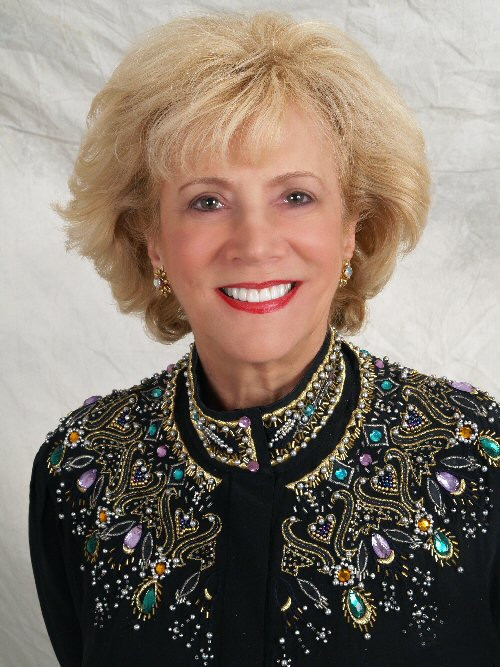
Paulette Cooper

Operation Freakout, also known as Operation PC Freakout, was a Church of Scientology covert plan intended to have the U.S. author and journalist Paulette Cooper imprisoned or committed to a psychiatric hospital. The plan, undertaken in 1976 following years of church-initiated lawsuits and covert harassment, was meant to eliminate the perceived threat that Cooper posed to the church and obtain revenge for her publication in 1971 of a highly critical book, The Scandal of Scientology. The Federal Bureau of Investigation (FBI) discovered documentary evidence of the plot and the preceding campaign of harassment during an investigation into the Church of Scientology in 1977, eventually leading to the church compensating Cooper in an out-of-court settlement.

On June 11, 1976, two Scientology agents were caught in the act of attempted burglary at a courthouse in Washington, D.C., as part of an operation to purge unfavorable records about Scientology and its founder, L. Ron Hubbard. The Guardian's Office was preoccupied for the next year with attempts to hush up the scandal. The church sought to bring a quick end to the dispute with Cooper in December 1976 when it proposed to settle with her, on condition that she was not to republish or comment on The Scandal of Scientology and agree to assign the book's copyright to the Church of Scientology of California. On July 8, 1977, the FBI raided Scientology offices in Los Angeles and Washington, D.C., seizing over 48,000 documents. They revealed the extent to which the Church had committed "criminal campaigns of vilification, burglaries and thefts [...] against private and public individuals and organizations", as the U.S. Government prosecutor put it. The documents were later released to the public, enabling Cooper and the world at large to learn about the details of Operation Freakout. Although in the end nobody was indicted for the harassment of Cooper, the wider campaign of criminal activity was successfully prosecuted by the United States Government. Nine persons were indicted by a federal grand jury on charges of theft, burglary, conspiracy, and other crimes. With the exception of two of them, the defendants agreed to uncontested stipulation of the evidence. All of the defendants were imprisoned, serving up to four years in jail. They were tried, convicted and sentenced in the same courthouse that their agents had been caught robbing.

== Background ==
Cooper, a freelance journalist and author, had begun researching Scientology in 1968 and wrote a critical article on the church for the British magazine Queen (now Harper's Bazaar) in 1969. The church promptly sued for libel, adding Queen to the dozens of British publications that it had already sued.

Undeterred, Cooper expanded her article into a full-length book, The Scandal of Scientology: A chilling examination of the nature, beliefs and practices of the "now religion"; it was published by Tower Publications, Inc. of New York in the summer of 1971. The church responded by suing her in December 1971, demanding $300,000 for "untrue, libelous and defamatory statements about the Church."

== 1972–1976: Operations Daniel and Dynamite ==
Cooper was seen as a high-priority target by the church's Guardian's Office, which acted as a combination of intelligence agency, legal office and public relations bureau for the church. As early as February 29, 1972, the church's third most senior official, Jane Kember, sent a directive to Terry Milner, the Deputy Guardian for Intelligence United States (DGIUS), instructing him to collect information about Paulette Cooper so that she could be "handled". In response, Milner ordered his subordinates to "attack her in as many ways as possible" and undertake "wide-scale exposure of PC's sex life", a plan which was named Operation Daniel.

Cooper counter-sued on March 30, 1972, demanding $15.4 million in damages for the ongoing harassment. However, the church stepped up the harassment, for instance painting her name and phone number on street walls so that she would receive obscene phone calls, and subscribing her to pornographic mailing lists. She also received anonymous death threats and her neighbors received letters claiming that she had a venereal disease.

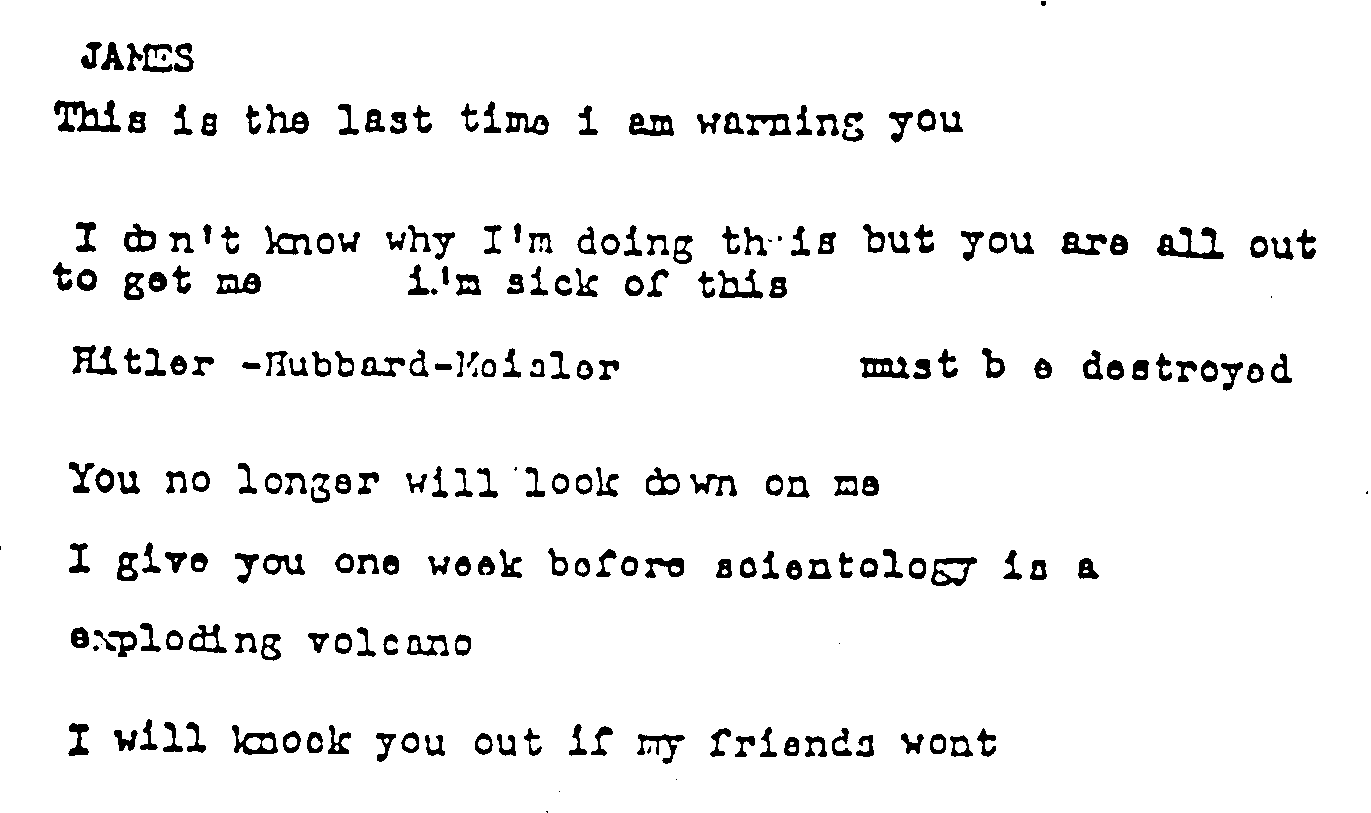
The second of the two forged bomb threats

In December 1972, the church launched a new attack called Operation Dynamite, an attempt to frame Cooper for supposedly making bomb threats against the Church of Scientology. That month, a woman ostensibly soliciting funds for United Farm Workers stole a quantity of stationery from Cooper's apartment. A few days later, the New York Church of Scientology "received" two anonymous bomb threats. The following May, Cooper was indicted for making the bomb threats and arraigned for a federal grand jury. The threats had been written on her stationery, which was marked with her fingerprints.

The charges were eventually dropped in 1975 with the filing of a nolle prosequi order by the local US Attorney's office, but it was not until the fall of 1977 that the FBI discovered that the bomb threats had been staged by the Guardian's Office. A contemporary memorandum sent between two Guardian's Office staff noted on a list of jobs successfully accomplished: "Conspired to entrap Mrs. Lovely into being arrested for a felony which she did not commit. She was arraigned for the crime."

The church sued Cooper again in 1975 in the United Kingdom, the United States, and Australia in 1976.

The church itself imported Cooper's books into foreign countries for the express purpose of suing her in jurisdictions where the libel laws were stricter than in the United States.

== 1976: Operation Freakout ==
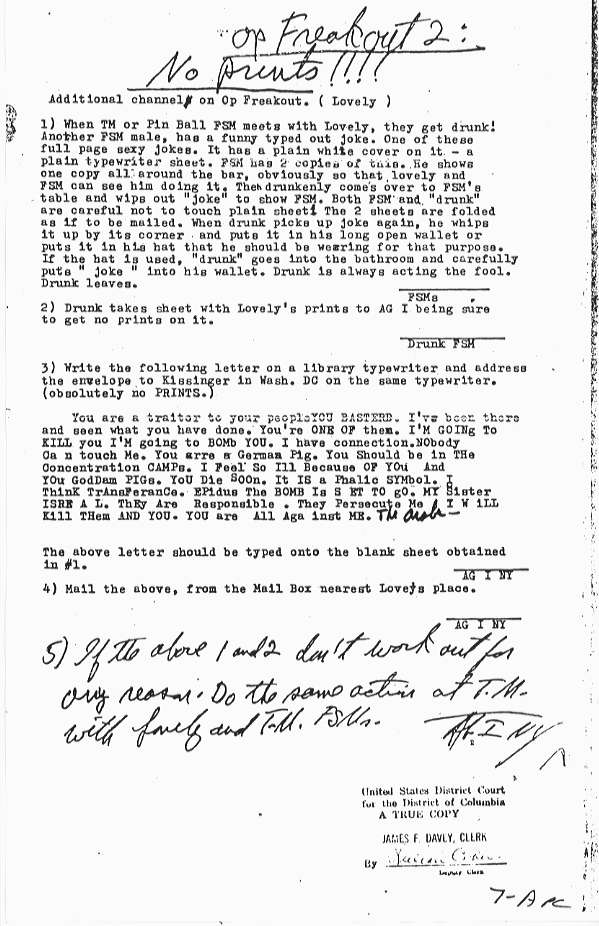
Part of the planning document for Operation Freakout, April 1976

In the spring of 1976, the Guardian's Office leadership decided to initiate an operation with the aim "To get P.C. incarcerated in a mental institution or jail, or at least to hit her so hard that she drops her attacks." The planning document, dated April 1, 1976, declared the aim to be "[t]o remove PC from her position of power so that she cannot attack the C of S [Church of Scientology]."

In its initial form Operation Freakout consisted of three different plans (or "channels", as the Guardian's Office termed them), tailored to implicate her by her Jewish descent:

1. First, a woman was to imitate Paulette Cooper's voice and make telephone threats to Arab consulates in New York City.
2. Second, a threatening letter was to be mailed to an Arab consulate in such a fashion that it would appear to have been done by Paulette Cooper.
3. Third, a Scientologist volunteer was to impersonate Paulette Cooper at a laundromat and threaten the current president Gerald Ford and then Secretary of State Henry Kissinger. A second Scientologist would thereafter inform the FBI of the threat.

Two additional plans were added to Operation Freakout on April 13, 1976. The fourth plan called for Scientologist agents to gather information from Cooper so that the success of the first three plans could be assessed. The fifth plan was for a Scientologist to warn an Arab consulate by telephone that Paulette Cooper had been talking about bombing it. A sixth and final plan was added subsequently. It was effectively a re-run of the 1972 plot, requiring Scientologists to obtain Paulette Cooper's fingerprints on a blank piece of paper, type a threatening letter to Kissinger on that paper, and mail it. Guardian's Office staff member Bruce Raymond noted in an internal memo: "This additional channel [the sixth plan] should really have put her away. Worked with all the other channels. The F.B.I. already think she did the bomb threats on the C of S [in 1972]."

On March 31, 1976, Jane Kember telexed Henning Heldt, the Deputy Guardian U.S., to update him on the situation:

PC [Paulette Cooper] is still resisting paying the money but the judgement stands in PT [present time] [...] Have her lawyer contacted and also arrange for PC to get the data that we can slap the writs on her. If you want legal docs, from here on we will provide. Then if she still declines to come we slap the writs on her before she reaches CW [Clearwater] as we don't want to be seen publicly being brutal to such a pathetic victim from a concentration camp.

== Exposure and aftermath ==
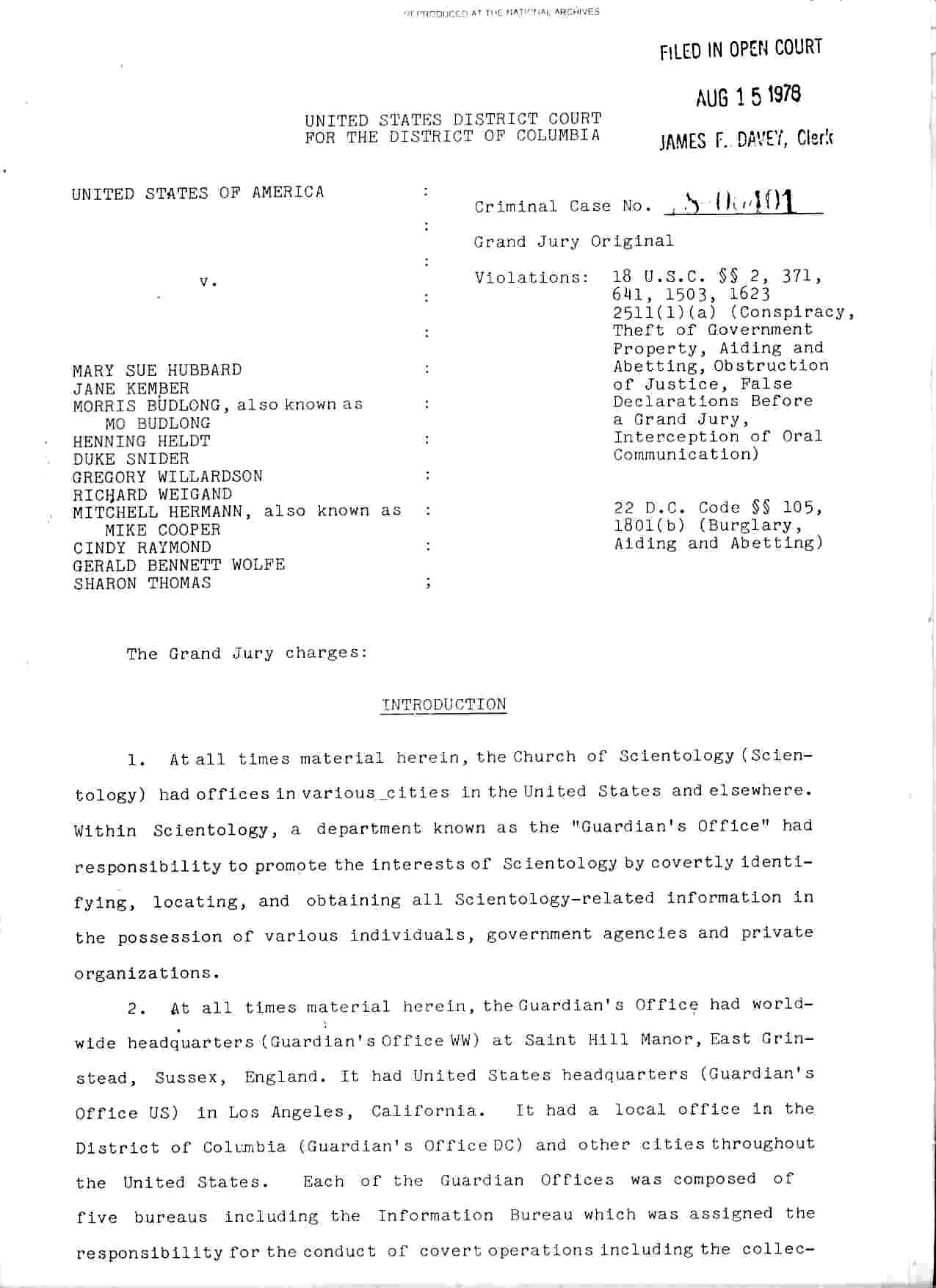
Grand Jury Charges, Introduction, United States of America v. Mary Sue Hubbard, United States District Court for the District of Columbia, 1979

Ultimately, Operation Freakout was never put into effect. On June 11, 1976, two Scientology agents—Michael Meisner and Gerald Bennett Wolfe—were caught in the act of attempted burglary at a courthouse in Washington, D.C., as part of the Guardian's Office's ongoing Operation Snow White—a criminal conspiracy by the Church of Scientology during the 1970s to purge unfavorable records about Scientology and its founder, L. Ron Hubbard. The Guardian's Office was preoccupied for the next year with attempts to hush up the scandal, even going to the lengths of kidnapping Meisner and holding him incommunicado to prevent him from testifying. The church sought to bring a quick end to the dispute with Cooper in December 1976 when it proposed to settle with her, on condition that she was not to republish or comment on The Scandal of Scientology and agree to assign the book's copyright to the Church of Scientology of California.

On July 8, 1977, however, the FBI raided Scientology offices in Los Angeles and Washington, D.C., seizing over 48,000 documents. They revealed the extent to which the Church had committed "criminal campaigns of vilification, burglaries and thefts [...] against private and public individuals and organizations", as the U.S. Government prosecutor put it. The documents were later released to the public, enabling Cooper and the world at large to learn about the details of Operation Freakout.

Sometime during late 1977, according to an affidavit given by Margery Wakefield, a secret meeting was held at the Guardian's Office where two murders were planned. The first of which was of a young man who had defected from Scientology and had been recaptured, and the second was an assassination of Cooper in which they were planning to shoot her dead. It is unknown whether or not these plans were attempted.

Although in the end nobody was indicted for the harassment of Cooper, the wider campaign of criminal activity was successfully prosecuted by the United States Government. Mary Sue Hubbard, Jane Kember, Henning Heldt, Morris Budlong, Duke Snider, Dick Weigand, Greg Willardson, Mitchell Hermann and Cindy Raymond were indicted by a federal grand jury on charges of theft, burglary, conspiracy, and other crimes. With the exception of Kember and Budlong, the defendants agreed to uncontested stipulation of the evidence. Kember and Budlong were convicted separately after being extradited from the United Kingdom. All of the defendants were imprisoned, serving up to four years in jail. Coincidentally, they were tried, convicted and sentenced in the same courthouse that their agents had been caught robbing.

The Church of Scientology filed at least 19 lawsuits against Cooper throughout the 1970s and 1980s, which Cooper considered part of "a typical Scientology dirty-tricks campaign" and which Cooper's attorney Michael Flynn said was motivated by L. Ron Hubbard's declaration that the purpose of a lawsuit was to "harass and discourage". Cooper discontinued her legal actions against Scientology in 1985 after receiving an out-of-court settlement.

== See also ==
- Fair game
- False flag
- List of Guardian's Office operations
- Operation Snow White
