= A Billion Years =

2022 memoir by Mike Rinder

A Billion Years: My Escape From a Life in the Highest Ranks of Scientology
- Author: Mike Rinder
- Language: English
- Subject: Church of Scientology
- Publisher: Simon and Schuster
- Publication date: 2022
- Publication place: United States
- Media type: Hardcover; eBook; audiobook
- ISBN: 9781982185763

A Billion Years: My Escape From a Life in the Highest Ranks of Scientology is a 2022 memoir by Mike Rinder. He was raised as a Scientologist, spent 50 years in the group, and is a former executive director of the Office of Special Affairs.

== Synopsis ==
The book is a memoir that showcases Rinder's experiences in Scientology, which began at the age of five while he was living in Australia. He discusses his decision to join the Sea Org in 1973 instead of going to university, his service on the Apollo, his assignment to be a Watch Messenger for L. Ron Hubbard, and his role as one of four messengers sent to seize control of the Guardian's Office when Mary Sue Hubbard was the subject of litigation.

Rinder describes an incident in which he participated in a prohibited sexual activity and how he was granted leniency because of his decision to marry the woman he was involved with. They subsequently had three children together, one of whom died of SIDS shortly after she was born.

The book also talks about the important roles that Rinder was given following Hubbard's death, and his struggles to meet the expectations of David Miscavige. He was assigned to deal with the Lisa McPherson case, mitigate Bob Minton's influence, improve the posthumous public image of L. Ron Hubbard, and direct the construction of the Psychiatry: An Industry of Death exhibit. He explains his eventual decision to leave the Church of Scientology after being labeled a suppressive person by Miscavige. Miscavige's accusations led to Rinder and other executives being subjected to harsh treatment, including being deprived of sleep and tasked with physical labour at unexpected intervals.

After leaving Scientology and conducting interviews for outside media, Rinder became a prioritized fair game target, being followed by multiple private investigators and surveillance cameras. He worked with Leah Remini on Scientology and the Aftermath.

== Reception ==
A review in The Guardian compared the beginning of the memoir to an adventure story and describes the dedication in which Rinder worked for the group. While he was often tasked with important roles such as arranging private tours for celebrity Scientologists, he also endured various forms of mistreatment. KCRW described the book as exposing the "secret inner workings, as well as the dark, dystopian truth about the powerful organization to which he had devoted his life to". A writer for Jezebel stated that it was an exposé of how the Church of Scientology conducts its harassment campaigns. The memoir also describes Rinder's personal experience leaving the group and facing disconnection from his family.

== See also ==
- The Hole (Scientology)
- Beyond Belief (memoir)
- Bibliography of books critical of Scientology
- Scientology controversies
