= Scientology and public relations =

Public relations strategies used by the Church of Scientology

Public relations in the Church of Scientology includes promotion, outreach, and reputation management, which it uses to shape public perception, attract new members, and respond to criticism. Since its founding in the 1950s, Scientology has used a wide range of public relations (PR) methods, including celebrity outreach, advertising campaigns, humanitarian branding, and online media. PR efforts are used to shape public perception, and Scientology's founder L. Ron Hubbard emphasized it as essential, writing extensively about managing public opinion and countering negative information. Over time, the Church of Scientology developed formal policies and procedures, departments, and affiliated organizations dedicated to public relations and reputation management.

== Celebrities ==
The Church of Scientology recruits celebrities to endorse Scientology as a public relations strategy, focusing on those in the fields of art, sports, management, and government. They have used prominent A-list celebrities such as John Travolta and Tom Cruise to spread goodwill about Scientology. They also use wealthy Scientologists like Robert Duggan and online influencers like Grant Cardone to help promote its ideals and suggest that Scientology leads to financial success. In 1955, Hubbard wrote "Project Celebrity", a program to target specific celebrities. According to Mike Rinder, Hubbard frequently name-dropped, "claiming association and interaction especially with Hollywood figures", envisioning their role as helping him gain publicity and acceptance, ultimately making up a list of celebrities to target for recruitment.

== Front groups ==
Scientology front groups are organizations named or operated in such a way as to disguise their association with the Church of Scientology. The Church uses front groups as a public relations tool, to introduce its ideas and techniques into society by presenting a neutral or secular face to gain access to audiences that would reject Scientology branding. These groups are also used to recruit new members, and to advance the Church's political interests. Time magazine reported that the Church attracts "the unwary through a wide array of front groups in such businesses as publishing, consulting, health care and even remedial education." Many of the groups are founded on pseudoscience, named disingenuously, and underplay their links to Scientology and L. Ron Hubbard.

According to Janet Reitman in Inside Scientology: The Story of America's Most Secretive Religion,

The use of social reform groups to spread L. Ron Hubbard's ideas had long been an integral part of Scientology, and was in fact one of the original objectives of the Guardian's Office. Since the late 1960s, the church has disseminated its philosophy through a number of organizations with hidden ties to Scientology, notably Narconon, a program that treats drug addiction and promotes Hubbard's holistic detoxification regimen, the Purification Rundown.

— Janet Reitman

== Office of Special Affairs ==
The Office of Special Affairs (OSA) has two primary roles: public relations and legal affairs. Its predecessor, the Guardian's Office, had six bureaus, one of which was for public relations and media relations. Karin Pouw is an OSA staffer who has been a spokesperson for the Church of Scientology since 1993, and heads the Church of Scientology International's Human Rights Office.

Youth for Human Rights International, United for Human Rights, and International Foundation for Human Rights and Tolerance are some of the many public relations organizations run by the Church of Scientology that promote human rights themes as part of their public relations and outreach activities.

== Advertising ==
Scientology has been advertising since it began. Starting in the 1950s, the early Dianetics Foundations advertised in local newspapers and magazines, selling books, selling tickets to lectures, and offering private therapy sessions. In the 1980s, the Church of Scientology's TV advertising campaigns for L. Ron Hubbard's book Dianetics: The Modern Science of Mental Health were rather successful at selling books and getting some new recruits. The Church produces professional video for advertising at Golden Era Productions and at their Scientology Network facilities. They also advertise during the Super Bowl.

Galaxy Press continues to advertise and sell Hubbard's science fiction novels, and since 1983 has been running the Writers and Illustrators of the Future contests.

== Broadcasting ==
In 2011 the Church acquired the KCET Studios property, and in 2018 they launched the Scientology Network, showing such content as "Meet a Scientologist", "What is Scientology?", and "Voices for Humanity". Quartz media said, "Unfortunately for Scientology, the church picked literally the worst time to get into the TV game. The number of cable and streaming TV channels and series has increased exponentially in recent years—making it harder and harder for brands to stick out in the era of 'peak TV'."

== Social media ==
In the 2020s, Scientology expanded its PR onto social media platforms such as TikTok, Instagram, and YouTube. In 2026, Mother Jones reported that local Scientology organizations began producing short form videos featuring younger members presenting church facilities, introductory courses, and auditing equipment, with the aim of creating a more approachable and youthful public image. These campaigns attracted both interest and criticism, with commenters questioning church practices and policies.

== Music ==
In the 1970s, when Hubbard was traveling around the Mediterranean on the Apollo ship with his nascent Sea Org, he formed a band called the Apollo Stars. Hubbard intended for the group to play at each port "to improve the Apollo's public relations".

Since 1989, The Jive Aces have been performing concerts of swing music and modern jive dance in the UK and on the European continent. They are Sea Org members, and the Church of Scientology manages and funds their performance schedule. They pair their performances with distributing Scientology literature to audiences including The Way to Happiness booklet. According to Rinder, "Entertaining people, selling records or entering talent competitions are seen ONLY as a means to the end of being able to better promote and gain acceptance for scientology."

== See also ==
- Scientology and the Internet
- Scientology controversies
