= Scientology officials =

Staff hierarchy, practices, personnel of Scientology network

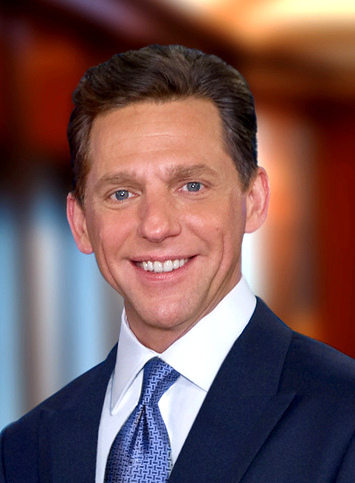
- David Miscavige, the top Scientology official
- Type: Organizational roles in Scientology
- Description: Staff members who hold administrative, managerial, or technical positions within Scientology organizations
- Hierarchy: Includes staff, Sea Org members, executives, and specialized technical personnel
- Employment structure: Contracts, long hours, low pay, production quotas, required training
- Duties: Administration, auditing supervision, training delivery, and organizational management
- Associated controversies: Labor conditions, long working hours, disciplinary practices, internal oversight

The Church of Scientology network operates as a multinational conglomerate of companies with personnel, executives, organizational charts, chains of command, policies and orders. (Note: Quote: "More than one observer has noted that Scientology's early organizational structure resembles less a traditional church than it does multi-national enterprises such as the Ford Motor Corporation, Coca Cola or International Telephone and Telegraph.")

Religious Technology Center is the most powerful executive organization within the Scientology empire, and its current chairman, David Miscavige, is widely recognized as the effective head of the church.

— Hugh Urban

== Hierarchy of staff ==
Church of Scientology personnel are bound by policy as written by L. Ron Hubbard and by orders from any senior. Each staff member is junior to those above them on the organizational chart (called an "org board") and is senior to those under them.

Scientology members (also called "public" (Note: The term "public Scientologist" or simply "public" refers to non-staff Scientologists, and is distinct from the term "raw public" meaning people out in society, those who are not (yet) Scientologists. The collective group of "public" members is called "the field".)) are those individuals who are not on staff, who pay the organization for training or auditing services, and who live and work separately from the Church of Scientology. Members defer to all staff personnel, who are seen as their seniors. All members and staff defer to Sea Org staff. Even though at-large members are not part of the organization proper, they are ranked within the entire chain of command and are frequently pressed into service for clerical or promotional tasks or recruiting new members. Members who recruit people for Scientology services are called "field staff members" (FSM) and are paid a commission of 10–15% of the amount the new person pays.

The recruit is transformed from a client to a follower and from a follower to a deployable agent.

— Roy Wallis in The Road to Total Freedom

== Employment structure ==
=== Staff contracts ===
Staff sign employment contracts, though in recent years these contracts label them as volunteers or "religious workers" to circumvent labor laws because staff are almost universally paid less than locally mandated minimum wage. However, all organizational policies written by L. Ron Hubbard refer to such workers as "staff".

These contracts have lengthy durations. At a Class V organization, a contract may be as short as 2.5 years; extending to 5 years or more if they are sent to Flag Service Org for extensive training. Sea Org members sign billion-year contracts; effectively a perpetual contract with no expiration date. Sea Org personnel live in communal housing; Class V staff make their own living arrangements and sometimes even have second jobs.

=== Pay ===
Staff hold posts where they are either given a small fixed allowance (Sea Org) or are paid based on a share-percentage of the organization's weekly gross receipts. Occasionally, those who work in sales or fundraising posts may have a chance for bonuses. Sea Org members who work for one of the for-profit corporations in the network are paid a minimum wage, reduced by deductions for housing and other expenses, bringing their pay back in line with other Sea Org allowances.

The employees of Hubbard's Org are not merely officials, but also disciples. Hence commitment of staff to the Org is secured by ideological means, replacing the need for the attractions of tenure, secure salary and orderly promotion through a work hierarchy.

— Roy Wallis in The Road to Total Freedom

=== Production ===
Staff are required to keep "stats" (short for "statistics")—a count of their production. They perform weekly evaluations of their own stats and are required to chart the stats on a graph, declare their "ethics condition" for last week's production, and write up their "ethics formula", laying out their plans for the next week. Personnel whose production stats were lower than the prior week, or whose graph shows a general downtrending pattern, are dealt with by the "ethics officer", often with harsh penalties. For example, certain conditions below "Normal" may preclude getting paid at all.

Staff may be punished, though usually for lack of production or insubordination, not usually for basic behavioral matters. In the Sea Org, staff are routinely removed from post and reassigned to the Rehabilitation Project Force (RPF), a forced labor and re-indoctrination program. Removing a staff member completely from the organization is called "offloading".

Sea Org members are heavily discouraged from engaging in any family activities such as the raising of children, and are expected to spend their entire waking hours in service to the Church of Scientology.

Further paralleling the institutional order of developed societies, ... Hubbard has strategically used that authority to establish Scientology upon the legal-rational basis of an almost ideal-typical bureaucracy. This social world is run along formal lines defined by "Policy"—the stream of bulletins and material written or authorized by Hubbard, periodically compiled into thick volumes and treated for all intents and purposes as law. Policy specifies every aspect of organizational life.

— Roger Straus in Scientology "Ethics": Deviance, Identity and Social Control in a Cult-Like Social World

=== Training ===
Though formal training courses are available for all posts, staff members are expected to be proficient at all times, whether trained or not. All posts have a "hat writeup" ("hat" for short) which consists of Hubbard writings pertaining to that post and other writeups written by those who held the post before.

=== Enhancement ===
Staff are recruited with promises that they are expected to train or be audited for 2.5 hours per day worked (called "enhancement"), but in reality enhancement time is usually bumped for the latest emergency—called a "flap" —or expected to be performed outside of their normal work hours.

Staff receive Scientology training, and occasionally auditing, on a deferred basis. Invoices are written up for services taken, but no payment is expected while the staff member continues to work for the organization. If they complete their contract, they are pressured to re-commit for another contract term, but if they leave having fulfilled their contract term their deferred invoices are forgiven or waived. While seeming to be free services, if a staff member is offloaded (fired) or breaks their contract by leaving before its term completion, they are immediately invoiced for all services rendered during their employment. Since Sea Org members sign perpetual contracts, their invoice—called a "freeloader bill"—can be quite high; no waivers or reductions being given for years of service rendered.

If a person leaves before their contract termination date without performing specific steps for leaving (called "routing out"), they are considered "blown" and such individuals will often be declared suppressive.

== Notable Scientology officials ==
This section contains a select list of some of the current and former officials, staff or notable insiders of Scientology organizations.

Bob Adams

A former professional American football player in the NFL, Adams served in 2004 as senior vice president of the Scientology organization's Association for Better Living and Education (ABLE). Adams worked in 2006 as a "communications executive with the Church of Scientology in Hollywood"; he was a vice president of the Church of Scientology in 2006. He held the position of vice president of public affairs for the Church of Scientology International in 2009, as well as vice president of the International School of Scientology.

Gerry Armstrong

Former member of Scientology's Sea Org, whose members "occupy the most essential and trusted positions in the senior churches in the Scientology hierarchy"; went on to become an outspoken critic of Scientology. While a member of the organization, Armstrong was "officially authorized by the Church of Scientology to write a biography" about L. Ron Hubbard. He left the organization in 1981.

Vicki Aznaran and Richard Aznaran

Vicki Aznaran joined Scientology in 1972. She was a Sea Org member who rose to be one of the top officials in the Church of Scientology, and was a deputy for Annie Broeker who had posted her as Inspector General of RTC (1984–1987). Vicki was also posted as president and chairman of the board of directors of RTC. Vicki's husband, Richard Aznaran, was the Church's head of security. When Hubbard died, David Miscavige made his play for power and displaced the Broekers, Hubbard's trusted aides. By 1987, Miscavige installed himself as head of RTC and he purged anyone loyal to the Broekers or the Aznarans. The Aznarans were sent to the Rehabilitation Project Force (RPF: Scientology's forced-labor reeducation camp) in 1987 but left the Sea Org shortly thereafter.
In 1988 the Aznarans filed suit against the Church of Scientology for false imprisonment and emotional abuse. The complaint alleged staff were treated with physical abuse, lack of sleep, brainwashing and slave-like conditions. Among other deprivations, they alleged staff were paid with 'tokens' to be exchanged for room and board, and any dissatisfaction with their work or attitude would cause tokens to be withheld, resulting in staff sleeping outside and being fed only rice, beans and water. In the early 1980s, both Richard and Vicki Aznaran had been assigned to the RPF at different times, separating them from each other. Even when not on the RPF, they were separated at times for lengthy periods, including a time when Richard was sent to Hubbard's ranch and was made to sleep in a horse stable.
They cooperated with Richard Behar for his 1991 exposé, The Thriving Cult of Greed and Power, where Vicki is quoted as saying "This is a criminal organization, day in and day out". In an interview with Forrest Sawyer which preceded Miscavige's only television interview, Vicki said Miscavige ordered attacks—"have them, their homes, broken into, have them beaten, have things stolen from them, slash their tires, break their car windows, whatever". The Aznarans filed affidavits in support of Fishman in the case of Church of Scientology International v. Fishman and Geertz, however, at some point Richard Aznaran reached out to Mike Rinder to negotiate a settlement of their own case; they did settle and Vicki retracted her March 1994 affidavit just a month later.

Annie Broeker

See Annie Tidman below.

Pat Broeker

Was a husband-and-wife team along with Annie Broeker as confidantes and caretakers of L. Ron Hubbard in his last years. Were deemed Hubbard's successors in leading the Church of Scientology, but were overthrown in a coup by David Miscavige. Pat left the Church; Annie stayed.

John Brousseau

Brousseau joined Scientology in the 1970s when he was 21, was in the Sea Org for 32 years, and fled in 2010. After contacting former executives Marty Rathbun and Mike Rinder, Brousseau was interviewed by the FBI several times, and agreed to cooperate with investigations of the Church of Scientology into abuses at the International Base. While in the Sea Org he worked many different jobs, including being assigned to the Tom Cruise household where he trained Cruise's staff to anticipate needs but remain invisible. He also worked in the Scientology film-making department, and was Hubbard's chauffeur for years—buying and customizing vehicles for Hubbard while he was in hiding. As a craftsman, Brousseau restored vehicles, customized luxury vehicles, and built fine woodwork. He supervised a comprehensive renovation on the Freewinds ship after its asbestos remediation. At another time he was assigned to security detail and was in charge of incarcerating people who wanted to leave, and after he mentioned he could no longer bear it, he was himself incarcerated in the RPF re-education camp for 3 years. He admitted to being the one who installed the steel bars and locks on The Hole, at David Miscavige's order. Brousseau's delusion started to crack when Miscavige ordered him to abuse his own juniors and he considered that Scientology's problems were likely caused by Miscavige's abusive leadership style. After watching all four episodes of Anderson Cooper 360° about Scientology, he planned his departure realizing he couldn't effect any real change because he was "an ant in a war zone". Brousseau was married twice while in the Sea Org, and was once brother-in-law to David Miscavige because their wives were sisters.

John Carmichael

Carmichael became a Scientology ordained minister in 1973. Since at least 1987 he was the President of the Church of Scientology of New York, and as of 2006 was the spokesman for all the Scientology establishments in the New York and New Jersey area.

Tommy Davis

Former spokesman and director of Celebrity Centre International, Los Angeles. Was listed as an "International Spokesperson" on Scientology Newsroom, the Church's official media resource center.

Jessica Feshbach

Joined the Sea Org in 1994, In 2005, MSNBC characterized Feshbach as a "Senior Scientologist", and Fox News Channel called her "a high-level Scientologist" within the organization. In 2006, MSNBC described Feshbach as, "a high-level Scientology practitioner and member of the Church's (Note: Use of "Church" or "the Church" is a common shortened form of "Church of Scientology"; see The Church (Scientology).) influential Feshbach family". Feshbach began working with assistants to celebrity Scientology member and actor, Tom Cruise, in April 2005; she attended to Katie Holmes. By 2009, Feshbach had become a public spokesperson for Scientology; as of January 2011, she was listed as an "International Spokesperson" on Scientology Newsroom, the Church's official media resource center.

David Gaiman

Gaiman (1933–2009) was part of the Guardian's Office and later public relations director for Scientology in the UK.

Leisa Goodman

Human Rights Director, Church of Scientology International.

Jefferson Hawkins

A former Sea Org member, Hawkins had joined Scientology in 1967 and was in for 37 years. Worked in the marketing unit. Creator of the 1980s Dianetics promotional campaign including the TV ads with the exploding volcano which landed the book onto The New York Times Best Seller list. The first of five assaults by David Miscavige was in 2002 when Miscavige leapt off a table on top of Hawkins, hitting and choking him. He left Scientology in 2001. His book Counterfeit Dreams: One Man's Journey into and Out of the World of Scientology was published in 2010.

Marc and Claire Headley

Both worked at Gold Base: Claire worked for RTC, and Marc worked in media productions. Left Scientology in 2006 and published the book Blown for Good. Unsuccessfully sued Scientology for forced labor.

L. Ron Hubbard

Hubbard (1911–1986) was the founder of Scientology.

Mary Sue Hubbard

Mary Sue Hubbard (1931–2002) was the wife of L. Ron Hubbard, Controller of the Guardian's Office. After being convicted in the United States v. Hubbard case, Miscavige convinced her to step down and retire.

Mark Ingber

Sea Org member since 1968. Was at one point Chief of the Office of Special Affairs (OSA Chief), and at another time Commanding Officer of the Commodore's Messenger Organization International (CO CMO Int) and the Watchdog Committee Chairman. In the 2004 musical chairs ordeal, Ingber was noted as violently and ruthlessly staying in the game until he was eliminated with just three remaining participants. Last known location was in The Hole, and he had been declared suppressive but kept on base with the other executives labelled such by David Miscavige.

Heber Jentzsch

Jentzsch (1935–2025) joined staff in the 1970s, and from 1982 was the long-time President of Church of Scientology International.

David Mayo

Former auditor of L. Ron Hubbard, former Senior Case Supervisor International, ousted by David Miscavige and sentenced to physical punishment in 1982. Mayo escaped and in 1983 started his own splinter group called Advanced Ability Center.

Warren McShane

McShane joined Scientology in 1973 and held numerous positions in the Church of Scientology including working in the Guardian's Office and holding the position of assistant guardian for intelligence in New York. In 1983 he joined Religious Technology Center and held the post of president of RTC, and later Deputy Inspector General for Legal Affairs RTC. McShane registered numerous trademarks for Scientology.
In RTC's attempt to stop the online publishing of their OT level texts in RTC v Wollersheim, McShane testified that "the church derives significant revenue from the fixed donations its members pay to study the texts". According to Mike Rinder, his reputation with Miscavige was "he's the best liar I know", and McShane was frequently used in lawsuit depositions to deny Miscavige's involvement with day-to-day operations of the Church of Scientology.

David Miscavige

Chairman of the Board, Religious Technology Center and de facto leader of the entire Church of Scientology network of organizations.

Denise Miscavige Covington Licciardi Gentile

Denise is the twin of David Miscavige, daughter of Ron and Loretta Miscavige, and has an older brother Ronnie Junior and a younger sister Lori, and four children of her own—two by first husband Robert Covington, and one with husband Jerry Gentile. David and Denise were considered prodigies in Scientology when they were both on the advanced training course, Saint Hill Special Briefing Course, as 13-year-olds in England. Denise Miscavige audited Mike Rinder during that time (1973), and in 2018 she completed the level of OT VI.
In the mid-1990s, Denise Licciardi was hired by major Scientology donor Bryan Zwan as a top executive earning six figures for the Clearwater-based company Digital Lightwave, where she pushed in Hubbard's administration techniques and was linked to an accounting scandal including inflating sales figures for two quarters, and counting partial shipments as fulfilled contracts. Her actions "triggered SEC and Nasdaq investigations, and more than 20 shareholder lawsuits". Despite the company's top two financial officers pressuring Zwan to fire Licciardi, because of her connections it was the non-Scientologist financial officer who was dismissed, though he was later awarded a $5.2-million judgment in arbitration. Denise Licciardi resigned in 1998 with a severance package.
In 2007, Denise Gentile was auditing Scientologist Thomas Brennan, whose ex-wife and son Kyle were not Scientologists. Kyle was in the care of a psychiatrist and was on the medication Lexapro, when Kyle shot himself in the head with his father's handgun after the father took Kyle's medication away from him. The police found the medication locked inside the trunk of Tom's vehicle. Kyle's mother filed a wrongful death lawsuit against the Church of Scientology, its Flag Service Organization, and the three Scientologists: her ex-husband Thomas Brennan, and Denise with her husband Gerald Gentile.
In 2013, Denise Gentile was arrested on DUI and misdemeanor marijuana possession charges. The Tampa Bay Times wrote several articles detailing Denise's involvement in a drug house she and her husband Jerry Gentile rented out.

Ron Miscavige

Ron Miscavige (d. 2021) was the father of David Miscavige. He entered into Scientology in 1969, and in 1985 moved to Gold Base where he composed music for church albums and promotional materials. He left Scientology in 2012, and in 2016 published his memoir Ruthless: Scientology, My Son David Miscavige, and Me.

Shelly Miscavige

Wife of David Miscavige, formerly his "communicator" (executive assistant), not seen publicly since 2007, and reputedly still in the Sea Org.

Kendrick "Rick" Moxon

Prominent Scientology attorney, previously member of Scientology division the Guardian's Office.

Karin Pouw

Spokeswoman, director of public affairs for Church of Scientology International, and member of Office of Special Affairs (OSA).

Mark "Marty" Rathbun

Former president of the Religious Technology Center; later left the Church of Scientology and took part in a St. Petersburg Times exposé on the Church; today practices Scientology outside of the Church, operating a website that "has become an online community for what he calls 'independent Scientologists'."

Mike Rinder

Former executive director of Office of Special Affairs International (OSA). After years of abuse in The Hole, Rinder escaped in London in 2007 and became a high-profile critic of Scientology.

Eric Roux

Scientology spokesman, president of the Union of the Churches of Scientology in France, Vice-President of the European Office of the Church of Scientology for Public Affairs and Human Rights, chairman of European Interreligious Forum for Religious Freedom, and has authored the book Everything you need to know about Scientology (in French).

Aaron Saxton

Former member of the Commodore's Messenger Organization, and senior official within the Sea Org; later a prominent whistleblower whose exposés prompted debates in the Australian Senate.

Kenneth Howard Shapiro

Registar of Church of Scientology of Los Angeles branch.

Norman Starkey

Norman Starkey (1943–2019) joined Scientology in 1960 in South Africa and served on the Apollo and became the captain of the ship. In a will executed the day before the death of L. Ron Hubbard, Starkey was appointed trustee and executor of Hubbard's estate (Author's Trust Fund B). For years Starkey was deputy to David Miscavige and was involved in many of the actions related to the "Corporate Sort Out" project of the 1980s. After the Corporate Sort Out, the Church of Spiritual Technology (CST) was created to take over the functions of Author's Trust Fund B, with Starkey in charge and doing business as L. Ron Hubbard Library. Starkey has worked in the All Clear Unit, Commodore's Messenger Org, the Guardian's Office legal bureau, AVC Aide post, was in charge of the RPF at Happy Valley, and has been president of Author Services Inc. According to an account by Marc Headley, in at least one of Miscavige's "group punishments" it was Norman Starkey who read the lines for the "overboard drill" at Gold Base—"We commit your sins to the waves; may you arise a better thetan"—read prior to each staff member being forced to jump into the swimming pool wearing their full uniform. Reported to have been one of the prisoners in The Hole. In 2023, it was uncovered that Starkey had died 4 years prior, with his death being kept a secret by the Church of Scientology.

Michelle Stith

AKA Chel Stith. In 2005 was President of the Church of Scientology of Los Angeles, later Deputy Executive Director of the Church of Scientology of Pasadena.

Andre Tabayoyon

Andre Tabayoyon, an ex-marine with Vietnam War experience, worked for the Church of Scientology for 21 years and was the security chief for Gold Base. He later testified extensively on the security conditions of the base including weapons, explosives, security fencing with spikes, armed patrols, monitoring devices, conditions of labor, the RPF, practices of forced confessionals, fair game, and other human rights abuses. When he left Scientology, David Miscavige—as revenge—ordered Tabayoyon's son to change his name and then shipped him off to Denmark.

Annie Tidman

Annie Tidman (1956–2011), formerly known as Annie Broeker was L. Ron Hubbard's primary caretaker in his last years until his death in 1986. Tidman was one of the original four Commodore's messengers joining in 1968 at age 12. Along with her then-husband Pat Broeker, the couple produced a document allegedly from Hubbard wherein he deemed the couple as successors in leading the Church of Scientology. In 1987 David Miscavige published a counter-document stating the original was fabricated and that he was elevating himself as leader of the Church. Pat left; Annie stayed. Tidman tried to escape in 1992 but was caught, and remained at Gold Base until her death in 2011.

Kurt Weiland

Director of external affairs, Office of Special Affairs, and director, Church of Scientology International.

Marc Yager

Yager joined the Sea Org in 1974 as a teenager and sailed with Hubbard on the Apollo. As a member of the Commodore's Messenger Organization (CMO), he worked as Hubbard's personal messenger and assisted Hubbard in video production. Yager was appointed Commanding Officer of CMO International (1982–1987 and 1993–), and Inspector General for Administration Religious Technology Center (IGA RTC) 1987–1993. As CO CMOI, he held the post of Chairman of the Watchdog Committee.
Yager suffered years of abuse from David Miscavige (c. 1995–2003) including being physically assaulted. He was held under private watch (1995–1996), then assigned to the Rehabilitation Project Force, and later was confined in "The Hole".

Robert Vaughn Young and Stacy Brooks (formerly Stacy Young)

Vaughn (1938–2003) worked for the Church of Scientology for 22 years; was a national spokesperson and worldwide public relations officer; worked under David Miscavige at Author Services Inc. Stacey (1952–) worked for Scientology for 15 years; worked under Mike Rinder at Office of Special Affairs USA. In 1989 they left the Sea Org together and were fair gamed and surveilled for years by Scientology. Both later were expert witnesses against Scientology in several prominent legal cases. Vaughn went on to become an online critic of Scientology, and Stacey an anti-Scientology advocate with the Lisa McPherson Trust.

== See also ==
- List of Scientologists
