= Leisa Goodman =

American Scientology official

- Employer: Church of Scientology International
- Title: Human Rights Director, Church of Scientology International

Leisa Goodman is an American official of the Church of Scientology. As of 2005, she served as the Human Rights Director for the Church of Scientology International. She had previously served as a spokesperson for the Church and served as its media relations director.

In her capacity as media relations director she managed Church of Scientology websites, presented the church's viewpoints about its conflict with critics on the Internet to the media, and traveled to Germany on a six-month fact finding mission to investigate the country's treatment of Scientologists.

== Career ==
In 1990 Goodman was a spokesperson for the Church of Scientology out of the L. Ron Hubbard Office of Public Relations in Los Angeles, California. Goodman was a spokesperson for the Church of Scientology International in 1993 and 1994. In 1995, Goodman served as the media relations director for the Church of Scientology, and in this role she managed Scientology websites, and responded to the media about the Church of Scientology's attempts to curtail the spread of their documents on the Internet. Jim McClellan of The Observer recommended Goodman's home page at www.theta.com for information about Scientology's perspective on its conflict with critics on the Internet. As media relations director she traveled to Germany in 1997 on a six-month fact finding mission to investigate the treatment of Scientologists in the country. She told the Los Angeles Daily News that she spoke with 200 Scientologists who said that they experienced adverse effects due to being members of the Church of Scientology including losing their jobs and having their bank accounts closed. Goodman defended the Church of Scientology's analogy to the Nazis in describing Germany's treatment of Psychiatrists, saying "We know it is not a popular thing to say. But the truth isn't always popular."

Goodman traveled to Clearwater, Florida along with other high-ranking members of the Church of Scientology including then-head of Scientology's Office of Special Affairs Mike Rinder and general counsel Elliot Abelson, to attend a counter-protest and response to an organized protest by critics of Scientology held in front of the Church of Scientology's Fort Harrison Hotel in March 1997. Critics including Jeff Jacobsen, David S. Touretzky and others were protesting the death of Lisa McPherson while under the care of members of the Church of Scientology, and Goodman explained to the St. Petersburg Times that Scientologists who live in Clearwater did not want the critics' protest to transpire without a response: "They're not about to stand by and do nothing. They've got First Amendment rights. They take it very personally. This is their town."

Goodman became the Human Rights Director for the Church of Scientology International in 1997, and as of 2002 worked out of Scientology offices in Los Angeles.

== See also ==
- Scientology and the Internet
- List of Scientology officials
