= Kurt Weiland =

Executive in the Church of Scientology International

- Employer: Church of Scientology International
- Title: Director of External Affairs, Office of Special Affairs

Kurt Weiland is an executive in the Church of Scientology International with the title "External Affairs Director, Office of Special Affairs International". He works in Los Angeles, California.

== Career in the Church of Scientology ==
According to Weiland's executive profiles, he became a Scientologist in 1973, and joined staff in 1974. As a native of Austria, in the 1970s he worked at the Munich church and became the Director of Public Affairs for the region of Germany, Austria and Switzerland. In 1981 his position was responsible for government and legal affairs for Europe and the Near East, and in 1987 he became External Affairs Director of the Office of Special Affairs International, a position in the Church of Scientology International. (Note: Weiland's title is sometimes styled "Director of Church of Scientology International" or simply "spokesman".) Weiland works out of the Church of Scientology's offices in Los Angeles, California.

In 1984, Weiland was a staff member of the Church of Scientology's Religious Technology Center and performed work for the organization in Santa Barbara, California. Weiland was executive director of Scientology's Office of Special Affairs in 1994, and was responsible for its international legal affairs and public relations. In December 1994, he prevented Richard Leiby, a reporter for The Washington Post, from attending a luncheon at the National Press Club sponsored by the Church of Scientology International. Weiland did not allow Leiby to enter the First Amendment Lounge, and told him: "You seem to make a living by writing falsehoods." "We know that you used to work in Clearwater, and we know exactly what you wrote," Weiland said to Leiby.

In an interview at the National Press Club in 1994, the St. Petersburg Times asked Weiland and Scientology President Heber Jentzsch about the Church of Scientology's practice of investigating reporters who write about Scientology. "First of all, we don't do that. There's no institutional or organized campaign or effort or action ongoing to go after a reporter," claimed Weiland. When asked about a discrepancy after Church of Scientology officials confirmed in 1998 that their attorneys had hired a firm to investigate a reporter for the Boston Herald, Weiland said: "It's not a personal thing. Every time a reporter steps out of his way to create damage to the church ... then, of course, it's gloves off." He said that the Boston Herald reporter's articles were inaccurate, and the Church of Scientology decided to investigate the individual in order to determine what "vested interest" he was working for and what "sinister motive" he had.

Weiland was the deputy commanding officer of the Office of Special Affairs in 1995. In 1996 he was director of the Office of Special Affairs, and in 1997 Weiland managed external affairs for the Church of Scientology.

On June 13, 2003, Weiland accompanied actor and Scientologist Tom Cruise and director of the Church of Scientology's Los Angeles Celebrity Centre, Tommy Davis, to meet with then-United States deputy secretary of state Richard Armitage. In the half-hour-long private meeting, they raised concerns with Armitage about the treatment of Scientologists in Germany and other countries.

In 2006, Weiland was listed on a "Senior Honor Roll" in Impact, the magazine of the International Association of Scientologists.

According to former Gold Base workers, Weiland was detained in The Hole, a pseudo-prison which Church of Scientology leader David Miscavige started in 2004.

== See also ==
- Office of Special Affairs
- Scientology officials
