= Stith =

Stith is a surname. It may refer to:

- Shyrone O. Stith (b. 1978), American Professional Football player
- Bryant Stith (b. 1970), American professional basketball player
- Charles Richard Stith (born 1949), American author and editor; former U.S. Ambassador to Tanzania
- DM Stith (b. 1980), American singer-songwriter
- James H. Stith (b. 1941), American physicist
- John Stith (fl. 1656–1691), Virginia colonist, member of the Virginia House of Burgesses
- John E. Stith (b. 1947), American science fiction author
- Laura Denvir Stith (b. 1953), American jurist, judge on the Supreme Court of Missouri
- Michelle Stith (contemporary), President of the Los Angeles, California branch of the Church of Scientology
- Thomas Stith III (contemporary), town councilman of Durham, North Carolina
- William Stith (1707–1755), an early American historian and the third president of the College of William & Mary

Stith is also a first name, and may refer to:

- Stith Thompson (1885–1976), folklorist
