= Stephen A. Kent =

Canadian sociologist of religion

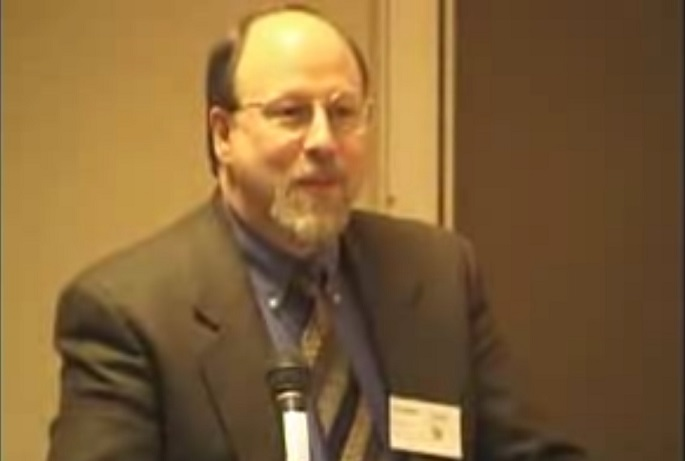
- Kent in 2000
- Citizenship: Canada; United States
- Known for: From Slogans to Mantras
- Awards: Graduate Student Supervisor Award (2009); Bill Meloff Memorial Teaching Award (2010)

Academic background
- Education: University of Maryland, College Park, B.A. (1973); American University, M.A. (1978); McMaster University, Ph.D. (1984)

Academic work
- Discipline: Sociology of religion, New religious movements
- Institutions: Professor of Sociology, University of Alberta
- Website: skent.ualberta.ca

Stephen A. Kent is a Canadian-American sociologist of religion. He is a professor emeritus in the Department of Sociology at the University of Alberta in Edmonton. He researches new religious movements (NRMs), and has published research on several such groups including the Children of God (The Family), the Church of Scientology, and other NRMs in Canada.

== Education ==
Kent graduated from the University of Maryland, College Park, in 1973, with a B.A. degree in sociology and a minor in social and political theory. In 1978, he was awarded a master's degree in the history of religions from American University. Kent was also awarded an M.A. in 1980 from McMaster University with a focus in religion and modern Western society and a minor in Indian Buddhism; he was granted a Ph.D. in religious studies in 1984 from the same institution.

From 1984 to 1986, Kent held an Izaac Walton Killam Postdoctoral Fellowship in the sociology department at the University of Alberta. He is a professor emeritus in the Department of Sociology at the University of Alberta in Edmonton.

== Research ==
John H. Simpson writes in a chapter of Lori G. Beaman's 2006 book Religion and Canadian Society that Kent "finds himself on the cult side of the cult/new religious movement divide." Irving Hexham commented in a 2001 article in Nova Religio that Kent "has been outspoken in his criticism of many new religions, particularly Scientology, and who works closely with various anticult groups."

Stephen A. Kent speaks at conference of Leo J. Ryan Education Foundation, formerly CULTInfo (March 18, 2000)

Simpson recommends Kent for further reading on the group the Children of God and notes: "He has done extensive research on new religious movements and argues that we need to be careful about minimizing the risks of involvement with such groups. His work is a good example of the issues taken up by scholars who focus on 'cults.'" Kent has devoted significant study to the Children of God, and the group's founder David Berg. Some researchers, including sociologist Lorne L. Dawson, have criticized Kent's work for his use of ex-member testimony. In response to these critics, Kent has argued that former member accounts provide outsider insights not available to members who misattribute divine authority to leaders in high demand religious groups.

=== Scientology ===
Kent's research of Scientology has focused on its organization, the Rehabilitation Project Force (RPF). His extensive study of Scientology's history and practices led him to conclude that as a result of relatively young people becoming involved with the organization in the 1960–70s, some second-generation Scientologist children have left the group in "waves." Kent has commented to the media about Scientology's RPF, and the Scientology ethics and justice system, as well as its affiliated organization Narconon. He has published articles concerning Scientology and Hollywood, and commented that Scientology uses celebrities as "public relations officers for Scientology, and part of their mission is to represent Scientology to the outside world and to other governments."

According to CBS News, "[h]e's considered one of the foremost experts on Scientology. But inside the church, he's considered an anti-religious extremist who has been paid to testify against the church in court." Tony Ortega, former editor of The Village Voice, referred to Kent as an academic "who studies Scientology in depth," and the St. Petersburg Times referred to Kent as "an expert on the group." Kent has testified as an expert witness for parties suing organizations affiliated with Scientology, and subsequently Scientologists picketed outside of his University of Alberta office. Religious studies scholar J. Gordon Melton and Church of Scientology spokesperson Leisa Goodman have both questioned the accuracy of Kent's scholarship on Scientology. Kent responded to both critics, accusing them of breaches of ethics and poor research practices.

In 2017, he co-edited an edited volume titled Scientology in Popular Culture alongside Susan Raine, published by Praeger. It received positive reviews from commentators in Nova Religio, Choice, and the International Journal of Cultic Studies.

=== Satanic ritual abuse ===
Kent has researched testimony of individuals that have alleged Satanic ritual abuse, in a period from the 1930s to 1980s (also known as the Satanic panic). Kent's opinions on the legitimacy of satanic ritual abuse have received criticism. He wrote a two part journal article on Satanic ritual abuse for the journal Religion in 1993. Christopher Partridge said of this article that Kent "accepts uncritically the stories of alleged victims about satanic abuse [...] the problem is that there is absolutely no concrete evidence that such rituals are practiced and no evidence that Satanists are interested in carrying out such inversions of obscure biblical texts." Kevin J. Christiano notes in the book Sociology of Religion: Contemporary Developments that Kent's research "shows that the Bible and biblical themes provide the primary references for the articulation of abuse," noting that "purported cult ceremonies particularly used biblical references and metaphors." Sociologist Anson Shupe and Susan J. Darnell characterised Kent as "eccentric" on the subject matter, stating that research and police enquiries into the allegations of satanic ritual human sacrifice had proved them to be unfounded.

Responding to this article, Jean La Fontaine criticized it, saying that though Kent made "an effort to seem objective," the article was not and that it strongly suggested the reliability of the testimonies. La Fontaine argued that the main objective in writing the article had been to validate these stories. She said Kent's dataset was unusual and criticized the fact that the number of people interviewed was not made clear; she further criticized Kent's failure to analyze other possible origins for these stories as "at best an academic weakness of the article and at worst a strong indicator that the veracity of the informants had been accepted in advance." In a rejoinder to Kent's article on satanic ritual abuse, David Frankfurter argued that Kent "accepts every detail of every story as if photographed" without providing further context. He argued that Kent demonstrated dubious research ethics and a lack of scholarly objectivity, having only been granted the interviews in turn for assistance in interpreting their memories. Frankfurter argued that any analysis drawn on this data was subject to "gross methodological problems" which Kent ignored; Frankfurter said there was little forensic evidence for any of these claims and that many of the convictions of supposed perpetrators of satanic ritual abuse had been overturned.

== From Slogans to Mantras ==
Kent's book From Slogans to Mantras: Social Protest and Religious Conversion in the Late Vietnam Era was published in 2001 by Syracuse University Press. In the book, Kent explored how political activists from the period of the Vietnam War later turned to alternative religious movements including Hare Krishnas, Transcendental Meditation, Scientology, and the Unification Church. Publishers Weekly described From Slogans to Mantras as a "lucid and economical study," noting that Kent had examined the convergence between the interest of American youth in radical politics and protest and the pursuit of "unusual, cultish, spiritual traditions." James A. Overbeck wrote in Library Journal that the work is recommended for academic and public libraries, mentioning that Kent utilized personal narratives and alternative press in the book.

Doni Whitsett reviewed the book in Cultic Studies Review, writing that it contained informative content, and is an easy read free of sociological jargon which made it more accessible to non-expert readers. However, Whitsett also stated that it would have been interesting to compare those who did not choose the route of the ex-members described in the book and to analyze the differences inherent in these two subsets of individuals. Jill K. Gill reviewed the book in Humanities and Social Sciences Online and also commented on its readability, stating that it was succinctly written and engaging. Peter W. Williams reviewed the book in The Journal of American History and provided a less positive review, saying that the book was a "mildly interesting and useful footnote to the sixties" but that he wished the book had gone further than that. In 2003 it was cited by Choice as an outstanding academic title that should be owned by every library, with the reviewer calling it an "engaging and articulate book" with a "fairly compelling social psychological account" of the topic.

== Awards and recognition ==
In 2003, Kent's book From Slogans to Mantras was listed as one of the Choice Outstanding Academic Titles that should be owned by every library. Kent was recognized by his students at the University of Alberta in 2009. He received a "Graduate Student Supervisor Award" from the Graduate Students' Association on March 12, 2009. In April 2010, Kent received the "Bill Meloff Memorial Teaching Award" given by the Department of Sociology at the University of Alberta. He stated he would utilize the 1,000 USD award to "update the department's DVD collections in the sociology of deviance and the sociology of religion."

== Works ==
- —— (2001). From Slogans to Mantras: Social Protest and Religious Conversion in the Late Vietnam Era. Syracuse University Press. ISBN 0-8156-2948-6.
- Caparesi, Cristina; Di Fiorino, Mario; ——, eds. (2001). Costretti ad Amare: Saggi sui Bambini di Dio/The Family (in Italian). Forte dei Marmi: Centro Studi Psichiatria e Territorio.
- ——; Raine, Susan, eds. (2017). Scientology in Popular Culture: Influences and Struggles for Legitimacy. Praeger Publishing. ISBN 978-1-4408-3249-9.

== See also ==
- Anthropology of religion
- List of cult and new religious movement researchers
- List of sociologists
- Sociological classifications of religious movements
- Social psychology
