= Scientology ethics and justice =

Policies and techniques

- Type: System of ethics and justice in Scientology
- Description: A framework of rules and disciplinary procedures to regulate conduct and maintain organizational control
- Components: Ethics reports, conditions, justice actions, committees of evidence, security checks, suppressive person declarations
- Role: To correct behavior, resolve disputes, protect the Church of Scientology from perceived threats
- Associated controversies: Allegations of coercion, retaliatory discipline, confinement, hard manual labor, lack of due process

Scientology ethics and justice refer to a system of policies, procedures, and disciplinary mechanisms created by L. Ron Hubbard and used by the Church of Scientology to monitor and regulate the behavior of its members and staff. Scientology defines ethics as the actions an individual takes to regulate their own conduct, and justice as the corrective actions imposed by the group when a person fails to do so. The system includes a wide range of justice actions intended to correct deviations, including reports, files, interviews, hearings, courts, committees of evidence, orders, confessions, and security checks. The most severe action is declaring someone a suppressive person and expelling them from the Church, followed by the controversial practices of disconnection and fair game. Within the Sea Org, Scientology's elite management staff, additional punitive programs exist such as throwing people overboard, forced running, and heavy manual labor under confinement on the Rehabilitation Project Force. Scientology also uses a production-based model in which staff are evaluated on their weekly production (statistics). Scholars and critics have described the ethics and justice system as a mechanism of social control, noting its potential for coercion, arbitrary punishment, and human rights abuses.

== Structure and purpose ==
When the individual fails to put in his own ethics, the group takes action against him and this is called justice. — L. Ron Hubbard

Professor Stephen A. Kent quotes Hubbard as pronouncing that "the purpose of ethics is to remove counter intentions from the environment. And having accomplished that the purpose becomes to remove other intentionedness from the environment" and "(a)ll ethics is for in actual fact is simply that additional tool necessary to make it possible to get [Scientology] technology in. That's the whole purpose of ethics; to get technology in". What this translates to, says Kent, is "a peculiar brand of morality that uniquely benefitted (the Church of Scientology) ... In plain English, the purpose of Scientology ethics is to eliminate opponents, then eliminate people's interests in things other than Scientology. In this 'ethical' environment, Scientology would be able to impose its courses, philosophy, and 'justice system' – its so-called technology – onto society."

Researcher Jon Atack has expressed concern that, in the wrong hands, Scientology ethics can be wielded arbitrarily and absurdly, such as in the 1960s when British Saint Hill Scientologists declared a local pie shop "suppressive" for not carrying apple pie in sufficient quantities to their liking.

=== Ethics officer (EO) ===
The ethics officer is a staff member in a Scientology organization whose job is to ensure that staff members and all Scientologists are correctly following procedures. The EO works one-on-one with Scientologists to help them with ethics issues. In the Sea Org, this is called the Master-at-Arms. The ethics officer works in the Department of Inspection and Reports, handles all ethics and security matters, performs ethics interviews, does investigations, and follows up on ethics orders.

An ethics officer is expected to have ethics presence over all staff and public Scientologists — likewise a senior over their juniors, and any Sea Org member over any other Scientologist. Ethics presence is a person's quality of authority or command value, a combination of poise, attitude, effectiveness and enforcement. Per Hubbard, "ethics presence is an 'X' quality made up partly of symbology, partly of force, some 'now we're supposed to's' and endurance" and "as an executive you get compliance because you have ethics presence and persistence and can get mad."

=== Ethics reports and files ===
Every Scientology organization is required to keep ethics files on every person, staff or public. Scientologists are required to write reports on other Scientologists when they discover a behavior that doesn't follow policy. Even students in scientology-affiliated schools are required to write reports on their fellow students for rule violations, as do employees at companies run by Scientologists. There are numerous specialty ethics reports, but the most common ethics reports are "knowledge reports" and "Things that Shouldn't Be" reports.

== Justice actions ==
=== Chaplain's court ===
A sort of civil court process where two Scientologists can go to handle civil disputes.

=== Arbitration ===
There is no arbitration procedure within Scientology or written by Hubbard; the closest procedure to what is commonly known as arbitration is the Chaplain's court. However, in 2020 Mike Rinder wrote about arbitration—explaining that members must sign contracts before doing any Scientology services, and that these contracts were drafted with typical corporate language requiring arbitration rather than lawsuits to settle disputes with the Church corporations. (Note: Use of "Church" or "the Church" is a common shortened form of "Church of Scientology"; see The Church (Scientology).)

The bottom line is that there is no such thing as scientology arbitration. It was a term invented by scientology's in-house counsel to include in agreements designed to prevent civil litigation. Arbitration is not mentioned in any Hubbard policy letter anywhere. There is no prescribed procedure for "scientology arbitration." —Mike Rinder

=== Ethics hearing ===
An ethics officer may send out a formal request to a person or persons to show up for a hearing. An ethics hearing is a fact-finding hearing, to gather information about whether an ethics violation has occurred.

=== Court of ethics ===
A court of ethics is a disciplinary hearing based on evidence already collected. A court of ethics is convened by an ethics officer or an executive senior to the staff member being charged. The offenses being accused are of non-serious nature and the sentences are at the discretion of the person who convened the court of ethics. The court is not supposed to engage in investigation, but rather operate only on known evidence.

=== Non-enturbulation order ===
An order to a Scientologist stating that if one more ethics report is received on them, they will be declared a suppressive person.

=== Committee of evidence (Comm ev) ===
A comm ev is a disciplinary procedure, Scientology's version of a trial or tribunal, which is "rather like a court martial but without lawyers or formal procedural norms." A Scientologist is summoned to a committee of evidence to answer for a list of alleged crimes or high crimes. A panel of appointed Scientologists in good standing are to "gather and review evidence, determine guilt, and recommend punishment."

A Committee of Evidence is considered the most severe form of ethics action. — L. Ron Hubbard, HCO PL 29 Apr 65 III

The process starts at the request of an executive who makes a formal accusation. A convening authority initiates the comm ev by appointing a chairman, a secretary, and two to five other Scientology members, the majority of which should be senior to the accused. The committee will read and hear evidence for and against the accused. The panel has two weeks to complete the comm ev process. The accused may present their own evidence and testimony, as well as bring witnesses to testify, but may not bring any legal representatives. After reviewing evidence, the committee votes guilty or not on each charge, and conviction is determined by majority vote. The committee recommends punishment and the results are published as the findings and recommendations signed by all committee members. The only means of recourse is a review by a higher level committee, which reviews only recordings and documents from the original comm ev — no new evidence to be presented.

=== Security checking (sec check) ===
Interrogations done using an E-meter.

=== Dead file ===
Anyone disagreeing with Scientology or writing a nasty letter to the Church of Scientology is dead filed. Their letters go in the trash and the organization doesn't respond. Scientology magazines are not sent to persons that are dead filed.

== Suppression ==
=== High crimes ===
High crimes are serious violations of Scientology ethics policies, including publicly departing Scientology, reporting another Scientologist to law enforcement or civil authorities, or committing acts that are suppressive of the organization.

=== Suppressive person (SP) ===
An "SP" is a person designated as an enemy to Scientology. When a person is formally labeled a suppressive person by the Church of Scientology, a "Suppressive Person Declare" is printed on goldenrod-colored paper and posted on all public notice boards. A person thus labelled is said to have been "declared". It is a form of excommunication. To get un-declared involves doing A to E steps. Until then, a declared person may only communicate with the International Justice Chief.

=== Potential trouble source (PTS) ===
Someone connected to a suppressive person. According to Malko, "Any person, while active in Scientology or a preclear, [who] remains connected to a suppressive person or group." A PTS person works with the ethics officer to work out a plan to handle or disconnect from the suppressive person in their life. Sickness and injury are considered a sign that someone is PTS. There are several subcategories of potential trouble sources. PTS Type One is a person currently in contact with an SP, Type Two is someone connected to someone who reminds them of an SP in their past, and Type Three is someone who is psychotic. There are ten other types (A–J), including PTS Type B: those with criminal records. Persons who have been labelled PTS by the ethics department are not eligible to receive Scientology auditing or training.

=== Disconnection ===
Disconnection is the severing of all ties with someone declared a suppressive person. When someone is declared SP in Scientology, all Scientologists are pressured into disconnecting from the SP, including close family members, employees, clients, and friends. Refusing or failing to disconnect from an SP carries the risk of being declared SP oneself.

=== Fair game ===
Fair game is a retaliatory policy against perceived enemies which L. Ron Hubbard established in the 1950s, formalized in 1965, and described further in 1967. Since it caused bad public relations, in 1968 Hubbard prohibited use of the term "fair game" — but not its actions. The practice continues.

[A bulletin] went out naming [someone] as having been relegated to the condition of "Enemy," to be considered "fair game," defined by Hubbard as somebody who "may be deprived of property or injured by any means by any Scientologist without any discipline of the Scientologist. May be tricked, sued, or lied to, or destroyed."

— George Malko

Fair game is one of the penalties that can be leveled on a person for having committed a high crime against Scientology, or as a penalty after a committee of evidence. In two separate court cases (Armstrong and Wollersheim) the Church of Scientology argued that fair game policies are a "core practice of Scientology" and are therefore protected as "religious expression". Hubbard instructed his followers that "fair game" is appropriate treatment for journalists, judges, hostile lawyers, government agencies, psychiatrists and others.

=== Cancellation of certificates and awards ===
The penalty for some high crimes, or a punishment imposed by a committee of evidence, might include the cancellation of training certificates and auditing awards. If a training certificate is cancelled, the person must repay for retraining, and go through the course again.

=== International Justice Chief (IJC) ===
The IJC is the most senior ethics officer within the Church of Scientology network. While a suppressive person is working on an amends project to get back in good graces, they may communicate only with the International Justice Chief, a position at Church of Scientology International. As of 2023, the IJC is Mike Ellis, who has held that post since at least 2004.

=== A to E steps ===
The program of steps required of a suppressive person in order to get back in good standing. The steps include ceasing committing of any suppressive acts, making a public apology, paying off all debts owed to Scientologists or Scientology organizations, performing an amends project, communicating all of these actions to the International Justice Chief and receiving an affirmative reply. At that point, a returning Scientologist must re-train from the bottom of The Bridge to Total Freedom.

== Sea Org ethics ==
Sea Org staff are the highest in the hierarchy of staff members of Scientology. In addition to Scientology's general ethics system, Sea Org members are subject to additional disciplinary procedures and punitive programs specific to the Sea Org.

=== Master-at-Arms (MAA) ===
An MAA is the Sea Org equivalent to the ethics officer.

=== Fitness Board ===
The procedure to determine if a new Sea Org recruit is judged to be fit for remaining in the Sea Org, or to have one removed if deemed unfit, is called a Fitness Board.

=== Blow ===
Leaving the Sea Org without authorization is called a blow. It usually results in someone being declared a suppressive person. The term is also used for anyone leaving a staff position in a non-Sea Org organization, or a public person leaving Scientology. A blow drill is used at Gold Base: when someone escapes the compound or is missing, staff are deployed to nearby bus stations and hotels, airline flight records are searched, and the person is hunted down and recovered. Those recovered were placed on heavy labor duty and undergo intense interrogation.

=== Rehabilitation Project Force (RPF) ===
The RPF is a long-term labor camp for Sea Org members who are supposedly troublemakers or failures. Though billed as a method of redemption or rehabilitation, assignment to the RPF has often been used as a punishment and individuals have been kept on the RPF for years. RPFers are segregated from other Sea Org members, undergo security checks, and perform manual labor for most of every day. They may not speak to others.

=== Deck Project Force ===
A punishment level less severe than assignment to the RPF is assignment to the Deck Project Force. Similar to a new Sea Org recruit's experience on the Estates Project Force (a sort of boot camp), the member performs manual labor for most of the day. It is also called "being on the decks" or "assigned to the decks".

=== The Hole ===
The Hole is the name of a de facto prison building at Gold Base; an office building of two adjacent double-wide trailers that was turned into a prison by David Miscavige. All but one exterior door was barred shut, windows were fixed to limit opening them only two inches, and a 24-hour guard was posted at the remaining door. Initially, 40 personnel were placed inside until they "confessed their crimes" to Miscavige's satisfaction. The 'prisoners' slept on the floor, were fed cold leftovers or rice and beans, had limited access to washing facilities, and were subjected to daily confession sessions and public humiliation. At one point, the number of prisoners reached 140. Along with sleep deprivation and starvation, there was also physical brutality, and physical and mental torture. Though some people managed to escape the building, their escape from the surrounding premises would be thwarted by guards, cameras, motion sensors, and razor wire. Many 'residents' remained in the Hole for years.

=== Overboarding ===
Overboarding was a punishment started by Hubbard in the 1960s while aboard the Apollo whereby a student or staff member was blindfolded, their hands and sometimes feet were tied, someone recited "We commit your sins to the depths. May you arise a better thetan!" and they were thrown over the side of the ship into the ocean, a drop of 15–40 feet depending on deck. One journalist reported an 8-year-old child being thrown overboard.

Being hurled such a distance, blindfolded and restrained, into cold sea water, must have been terrifying. Worst of all was the fear that you would hit the side of the ship as you fell, your flesh ripped open by the barnacles. Overboarding was a very traumatic experience.

— Jon Atack in Piece of Blue Sky from an interview with Neville Chamberlin

After their training on the Apollo was completed and the Scientologists returned to their local organizations, they started alternative 'overboarding' practices, including throwing people in bathtubs, hosing them down, or pushing their heads into toilet bowls.

Though the practice of overboarding from the ship ceased around 1970, David Miscavige resurrected the practice when he marched his entire staff to the swimming pool at Gold Base and made each person walk the plank (diving board) and jump into the pool fully-clothed. After that first "overboard ceremony", Miscavige changed the venue to a "slimy pond" on the property and such punishments became a frequent practice.

=== Running program ===
One Sea Org punishment, called the running program, was turned into a fee-based service for public Scientologists called the Cause Resurgence Rundown. Allegedly devised as a therapy by Hubbard in the early 1980s and liberally doled out by David Miscavige as punishments, this program required a person to run around a fixed point such as a pole or tree for hours each day until they were exhausted, repeating this every day until they had some sort of realization. The minimum time to run each day was five hours, with many people being ordered to do ten to twelve hours of running. Participants were not allowed to talk to each other while running. Short breaks for food and short rests were permitted before being goaded to continue by a supervisor. For decades, rain or shine, summer or winter in the high desert of Gilman Hot Springs, California, and sometimes in full navy-style uniform, Sea Org members have run around a palm tree on a makeshift running track. Injuries and medical issues have been common, and many have left the Sea Org after being ordered to do the program.

Though a common punishment for Sea Org members only at Gold Base, in the early 1980s some of the franchise owners were ordered onto the running program. In 1982, David Mayo, Hubbard's own auditor and the highest level auditor in the Sea Org at the time, was ordered onto the running program, after which he left the Sea Org having decided Miscavige was destroying Hubbard's work. Amy Scobee reported that a diabetic woman was ordered to the running program; she went into hypoglycemic shock and they gave her some insulin and ordered her back to the running track, being pushed in a wheelchair. In 2003, Marc Headley did the running program for three months as part of a pilot prior to the Church of Scientology marketing the program for its paying members.

This in fact became a popular form of punishment: the "Running Program" ... was a nasty, physically exhausting experience that was supposed to be another Hubbard cure for recalcitrant Sea Org members. Remarkably, this punishment has been remarketed into a program called the Cause Resurgence Rundown, based on Hubbard's claim that circling around a fixed object "aligns your energy flows" and "restores your power as a thetan." People pay $5,000 to run in circles around a pole in the center of a large room at the Flag Land Base—a testament to how scientologists will accept anything if they are told it comes from Hubbard. —Mike Rinder

== Statistics ==
In Scientology, production statistics (measurements) are of paramount importance. "Stats", as they are frequently called, are plotted on a graph, usually weekly, and the slope of the line of the graph indicates one's condition for the week. Per Straus, "the term statistics is more generally used in a symbolic sense to refer to a person’s level of effectiveness and productivity or as a qualitative measure of the effects he/she causes." Stats are monitored by ethics officers, who may also "assign" conditions to others, regardless of stats.

When you reward down statistics and penalize up statistics you get down statistics. If you reward non-production you get non-production. When you penalize production you get non-production.

— L. Ron Hubbard

=== Ethics conditions ===
Hubbard defined seven levels of conditions (and five lower conditions) and codified a condition formula to perform in order to rise to the next higher condition. For example, one starts a post in the condition of Non-existence; if one performs the steps for the condition of Non-existence, then one rises to the next higher condition which is Danger. Continuing to perform the requisite formulas, one will rise up to Emergency, then Normal, Affluence, Power, and finally Power change. If one fails to correctly perform the steps of the condition one is in, one drops down to the next level lower.

The conditions are usually represented with Non-existence at the bottom and Power change at the top, and the conditions are assigned based on the angle of the line on the graph.

- Power change: What one does if one takes on someone else's post that was in a Condition of Power
- Power condition: A Normal trend in a new higher range
- Affluence condition: Line on graph is steeply up trending
- Normal condition: Line on graph is slightly up trending
- Emergency condition: Line on graph remains level or is slightly down trending
- Danger condition: Line on graph is more than slightly down trending
- Non-existence condition: Line on graph is steeply or vertically down, or no statistics at all

An example of a condition formula is the Emergency formula:

1. Promote.
2. Change your operating basis.
3. Economize.
4. Prepare to deliver.
5. Stiffen discipline.

=== Lower conditions ===
Lower conditions are not based on statistics graphs. When there is deviance from social or production norms, one is assigned one of the five lower conditions, which also have formulas. The purpose of performing the steps of each formula is to get upgraded to the next higher condition until one is back at Non-existence. The rankings of lower conditions start at the lowest level which is Confusion, and rises through Treason, Enemy, Doubt, Liability, and then to Non-existence. An example of a step on a lower condition is step #3 of the Liability formula: "Make up the damage one has done by personal contribution far beyond the ordinary demands of a group member."

=== Upstat, downstat, ethics protection, Kha-Khan ===
A person whose statistic is up trending, is called an upstat. A person whose statistic is down trending is called a downstat.

In 1965, Hubbard wrote, "Ethics actions are often used to handle down individual statistics. A person who is not doing his job becomes an Ethics target" and goes on to detail how a Scientologist can protect himself from Ethics punishment by being more productive and keeping statistics up: "In short, a staff member can get away with murder so long as his statistic is up and can't sneeze without a chop if it's down."

If the staff member's production is sufficiently high (as evidenced by an up statistic), the Scientologist gains an immunity to the Ethics process (ethics protection), even if they have openly committed violations:

When people do start reporting a staff member with a high statistic, what you investigate is the person who turned in the report. In an ancient army a particularly brave deed was recognized by an award of the title of Kha-Khan. It was not a rank. The person remained what he was, BUT he was entitled to be forgiven the death penalty ten times in case in the future he did anything wrong. That was a Kha-Khan. That's what producing, high-statistic staff members are – Kha-Khans. They can get away with murder without a blink from Ethics.... And Ethics must recognize a Kha-Khan when it sees one – and tear up the bad report chits on the person with a yawn.

— L. Ron Hubbard, HCOPL 1 Sep 1965, "Ethics Protection"

== See also ==
- Scientology and law
- Office of Special Affairs
- Guardian's Office
