= Heber Jentzsch =

American Scientology executive (1935–2025)

Heber Carl Jentzsch
- Born: October 30, 1935; Salt Lake City, Utah, U.S.
- Died: October 25, 2025 (aged 89)
- Occupation: President of Church of Scientology International
- Spouses: Yvonne Gillham; Karen de la Carriere
- Website: Scientology Bio at the Wayback Machine (archive index)

Heber Carl Jentzsch (October 30, 1935 – October 25, 2025) was an American Scientologist and was the nominal President of the Church of Scientology International, a title he held from 1982 until about 2010. For years, family members reported being unable to successfully contact him, and Jentzsch was not seen or heard from publicly after July 2012.

== Early life ==
Heber Jentzsch was born on October 30, 1935, in Salt Lake City, and grew up in a Mormon family in Farmington, Utah. His mother named him after her favorite Latter-day Saint apostle, Heber C. Kimball. Though born into a Mormon family, he was never baptized into The Church of Jesus Christ of Latter-day Saints.

He was the youngest of four children born to Carl Eugene Jentzsch and wife, Pauline Marguerite (née Olson), Carl's third of eight wives; Heber had 42 siblings on his father's side. In 1955, his father was convicted of practicing polygamy, was excommunicated from the Latter-day Saints, and served 15 months in prison, after which he moved the family to Oregon.

Jentzsch was educated at Weber College in Ogden, Utah, and the University of Utah, where he graduated in 1959 with a degree in communications. He also studied Eastern religions.

Before 1967, Jentzsch worked as a journalist for the Los Angeles Free Press and as an actor, having a part in the film Paint Your Wagon. He played a small part in an episode of the 1960s television series Combat! and an uncredited role in the film 1776.

== Scientology ==
Jentzsch joined the Church of Scientology in 1967, and claimed Scientology's Purification Rundown cleansed him of alleged radiation burns he had suffered at 15.

During the 1970s, Jentzsch became the public relations director of the later-notorious Guardian's Office, serving as the Church of Scientology's chief press spokesman. He continued in this role after his promotion to the post of President of the Church of Scientology International in 1982. In January 1986, Jentzsch faced the press on behalf of the Church to announce the death of L. Ron Hubbard. He often appeared in newspaper interviews, aggressively defending the church on several occasions. Despite his media prominence, Jentzsch had been called a titular president. He was sometimes described as "the leading spokesperson for the Church of Scientology International" in church publications.

== Arrest and trial in Spain ==
In 1988, Jentzsch was arrested in Spain along with 69 other members of Scientology. Jentzsch was incarcerated in a Spanish jail for about three weeks. He was released and fled to the United States after Scientology paid a bail bond of approximately $1 million. Sixteen people, including Jentzsch, were charged with "illegal association" and various other crimes including tax fraud and endangering public health. The trial of the indictees began in February 2001, but Jentzsch himself did not appear; the prosecution called for him to be given a 56-year prison sentence. However, the Madrid Provincial Court dismissed all but the conspiracy charge and eventually ruled (in absentia) that the prosecution had presented insufficient evidence to prove this charge as well, and in April 2002, the last charge was formally dropped.

== Marriage and children ==
Heber Jentzsch was married to Australian Scientologist Yvonne Doreen Gillham (née Harding-Wilson) (1927–1978) from 1972 until her death from cancer in 1978, at the age of 50. From 1978 to 1989, he was married to then-Scientologist Karen de la Carriere (b. 1944); according to de la Carriere, Jentzsch was pressured by Scientology leader David Miscavige to divorce her. In September 2010, de la Carriere left the church and became an anti-Scientology activist. Their only son, Alexander, died from untreated pneumonia on July 3, 2012, at age 27, while staying with in-laws.

== Disappearance and death ==
After serving as a main spokesperson for Scientology throughout the 1980s and 1990s, Heber Jentzsch stopped making public appearances in the early 2000s. According to multiple sources, he was taken to "The Hole" at Gold Base around that time as part of a purge of senior executives within Scientology ordered by Miscavige. There, he and other inmates had to live in cramped conditions in a small office bungalow without beds or proper sanitary facilities.

According to Karen de la Carriere, Jentzsch was able to visit their son Alexander for one day in 2010 and gave him a cellphone number to keep contact. Later that year Alexander found the cellphone number disconnected. This was supposedly the last time Alexander and Heber saw each other before Alexander's death in 2012.

Over the years, there have been several instances of relatives trying to reach Heber Jentzsch and to verify his wellbeing. His brother, David Jentzsch, recalled speaking to Heber around 2002 and again in 2005 or 2006 where he revealed that his life had been threatened by Scientology and that he would be forbidden to leave. By 2012, he had been unable to contact Heber for a while. However, he had learned that his brother attended a memorial service for Alexander that year. In 2018, Heber's niece Tammy Clark received a letter in response to a birthday card supposedly written by him. Clark however questioned its authenticity. She then requested support by the local police at Gold Base to be able to verify her uncle's wellbeing. According to her account, the police first agreed but then went into Gold Base without her being present. A police report subsequently confirmed Heber Jentzsch to be present at Gold Base, seemingly being well but being supervised by a "full-time nurse" throughout the meeting.

Scientology removed Jentzsch's biography from its website between 2009 and 2010 and now does not mention his name on any of their websites.

Jentzsch died at a nursing home on October 25th 2025, at the age of 89.

== Articles ==
- Jentzsch, Heber (2000-04-21). "Liberty, Equality, Intolerance", Los Angeles Times.
- Jentzsch, Heber (1998-02-25). Letter to the Editor: "German Scientologists", New York Times.
