= Karin Pouw =

Scientology official

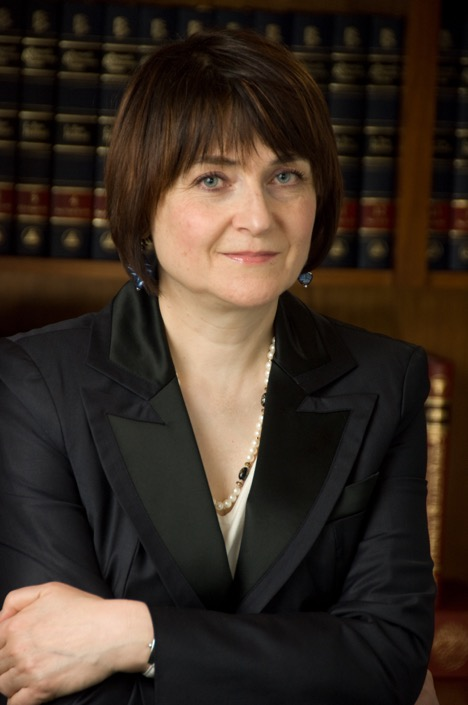
- Pouw in 2017
- Employer(s): Office of Special Affairs, Church of Scientology International
- Title: Director of Public Affairs; Spokesperson

Karin Pouw is a French-born American official within the Church of Scientology International. Since 1993, she has served as Director of Public Affairs in the Office of Special Affairs and is one of Scientology's international spokespersons.

== Career ==
Karin Pouw was a staff member for the Church of Scientology in Paris, France starting in 1977, and has been a spokesperson for the Church of Scientology International since 1993. In 1997 she was a public affairs officer for the Church of Scientology in Los Angeles. In 2000, the Los Angeles Times reported that she was a member of the Church of Scientology's Office of Special Affairs, which she said functions as a "public affairs office".

As of 2023, Pouw is an international spokesperson for the Church of Scientology, and the Director of Public Affairs for Church of Scientology International.

== Response to criticism of Scientology ==
Pouw has spoken out against activists and former Scientologists who publicly criticize Scientology. When Carnegie Mellon University professor David S. Touretzky spoke to the press about the Scientology-affiliated organization Applied Scholastics, Pouw said: "He is discredited in the field that he's trying to comment on. He is a specialist in rat brains." Scientology critic Arnaldo Lerma told The Washington Post that he left the Church of Scientology because he fell in love with one of Scientology founder L. Ron Hubbard's daughters, but Pouw said Lerma "left the Church because he could not maintain the ethical standards required of Scientologists". She has also questioned why former Scientologist Lawrence Wollersheim's organization FACTNet should have non-profit, tax-exempt status. "Wollersheim has been trying to con the church and the general public for 20 years. We recognized him for what he is and expelled him from the church. Now the law has finally caught up with him," she said after United States Marshals seized computers and documents critical of Scientology from Wollersheim's home after Scientology officials alleged that he was posting copyrighted material to the Internet.

Pouw issued a 15-page statement to the press in response to the January 2008 publication of Andrew Morton's unauthorized biography of Tom Cruise, Tom Cruise: An Unauthorized Biography. Pouw called the book a "bigoted defamatory assault replete with lies". Her statement about the book prompted Jenna Miscavige Hill, the niece of Scientology's leader David Miscavige, to publicly criticize Scientology and its practice of disconnection. Hill's written response was an open letter addressed to Pouw which was posted to the Internet, in which she stated: "I am absolutely shocked at how vehemently you insist upon not only denying the truths that have been stated about the church in that biography, but then take it a step further and tell outright lies." Hill countered Pouw's denial of Scientology's practice of disconnection, saying: "As you well know, my parents officially left the church when I was 16 in 2000 ... Not only was I not allowed to speak to them, I was not allowed to answer a phone for well over a year, in case it was them calling me." In response, Pouw told the Agence France-Presse: "The church stands by its statement of 14 January. The church does not respond to newsgroup postings."

Pouw has commented on the actions of the group Anonymous against the Church of Scientology as part of their movement Project Chanology. During Project Chanology's denial-of-service attacks on Church of Scientology websites in late January 2008, Pouw asserted to the Los Angeles Times that their websites "have been and are online". "These people are posing extremely serious death threats to our people. We are talking about religious hatred and bigotry," said Pouw in an interview with the Los Angeles Times. She said that Scientology sees the Internet as a useful medium of communication and that it is "concentrating on using the Internet as a resource for promoting its message and mission in this world, not as a ground for litigation".

In July 2010 the Church of Scientology International publicized a "Scientology Newsroom" website tailored for members of the media; Pouw was one of four international representatives for Scientology listed as "Spokespersons".

== See also ==
- Office of Special Affairs
- List of Scientology officials
