= Michelle Stith =

American artist

Michelle Stith, née Henderson, also known as Chel Stith, was in 2005 President. A of the Church of Scientology of Los Angeles. She has since moved on to being the Deputy Executive Director of the Church of Scientology of Pasadena. Stith has been quoted in the press answering questions about Scientology and its practices. According to Scientology publications, Stith has attained the Operating Thetan level of "OT III Expanded". In 2005, she stated that she had been a member of Scientology for thirty-four years.

Stith commented on the 2004 production of A Very Merry Unauthorized Children's Scientology Pageant, stating that Scientology did not want to protest the theatre production, and was quoted as saying "This is not litigation material."

In July 2005, Stith defended Scientology in media sources, after the Tom Cruise incident with Matt Lauer on The Today Show where Brooke Shields' use of medication for postpartum depression was discussed. Stith called criticism by the media "hogwash", and stated "This is a very practical religion." In August 2005, Stith was quoted as asserting that Scientology has 40,000 members in the Los Angeles area alone. In 2005, Stith has asserted that Scientology has grown more internationally in the past five years, than in all previous years combined, and that its current membership numbered 10 million.

Stith stated that her sister was a member of the Sea Org, and has five children, when asked about rumors of coerced abortions within Scientology. She went on to note that she herself is a mother of four, works as an artist, and also works forty-hours per week for Scientology. In 2006, Stith's pregnancy and delivery was reported on in the Chicago Daily Herald, in a report analyzing the silent birth practices of Scientology, and how this would apply to Katie Holmes. The birth of Stith's fifth child, a boy, was described, in which Stith refused painkillers, and there was silence in the delivery room. All of the medical personnel were also quiet, and when the baby was born, the physician whispered to Stith "It's a boy." When asked about L. Ron Hubbard's own use of medications, and the presence of certain medications in the coroner's toxicology report after Hubbard's death, Stith stated: "He might have been taking some medicine for asthma, but he certainly was not under any medicine for psychiatric reasons."
