= Mike Rinder =

American Scientology critic (1955–2025)

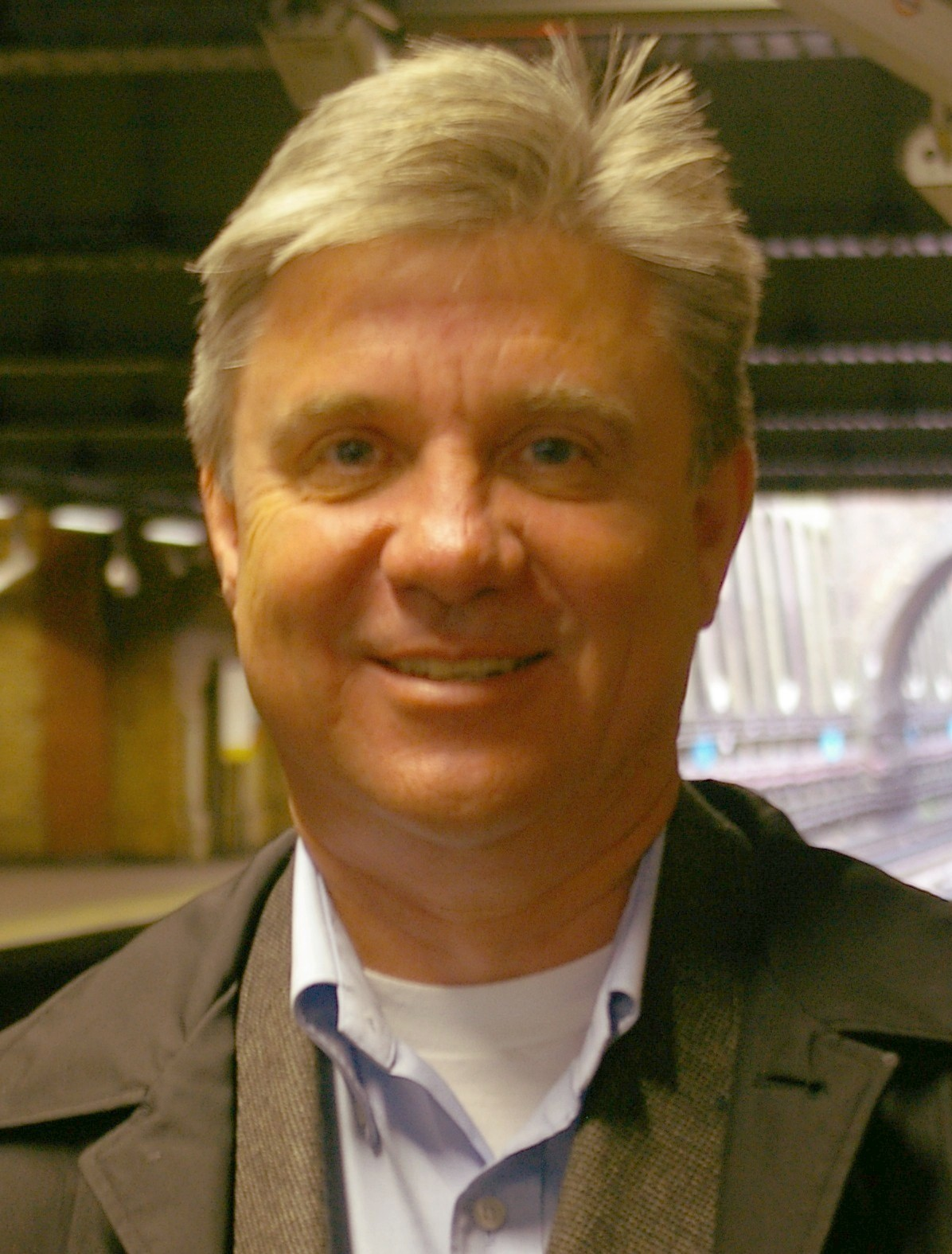
- Rinder in 2010
- Born: Michael John Rinder; April 10, 1955; Adelaide, South Australia
- Died: January 5, 2025 (aged 69); Palm Harbor, Florida, U.S.
- Citizenship: Australia; United States
- Known for: A Billion Years: My Escape From a Life in the Highest Ranks of Scientology
- Spouses: Cathy Rinder (m. 1976; div. 2007) Christie Collbran (m. 2013)
- Children: 4

YouTube information
- Channel: Mike Rinder
- Genre: Video Podcast
- Subscribers: 44 thousand (as of his death)
- Views: 2.8 million
- Website: mikerindersblog.org

Michael John Rinder (/ˈrɪndər/; April 10, 1955 – January 5, 2025) was an Australian and American former senior executive of the Church of Scientology International (CSI) and Sea Org based in the United States. From 1982 to 2007, Rinder was on the board of directors of CSI and also held the post of executive director of its Office of Special Affairs, overseeing the corporate, legal and public relations matters of Scientology at the international level.

Rinder left Scientology in 2007. Since then he talked about the physical and mental abuse inflicted upon staff members by the leader of Scientology, David Miscavige, and by Rinder himself before his departure from the organization. He also stated that abuse was embedded into the culture of Scientology. From 2016 to 2019, he co-hosted the Emmy Award-winning A&E documentary series Leah Remini: Scientology and the Aftermath. In 2020, he and Remini reunited to launch the podcast Scientology: Fair Game. In September 2022, he published a memoir titled A Billion Years: My Escape From a Life in the Highest Ranks of Scientology.

== Scientology career ==
=== Early years ===
Rinder was born in Adelaide, South Australia, on April 10, 1955, to Ian and Barbara Rinder. When he was 5 years old, his parents became interested in Scientology and the family began attending the Church of Scientology International center in Australia.

In a 2006 interview with Rolling Stone, Rinder said he had experienced discrimination in Australia during the period when the state of Victoria had banned Scientology: "You couldn't own Scientology books ... If you did, you had to hide them because if the police came and found them, they'd take them away."

=== Joining Sea Org ===
After finishing high school, at age 18 Rinder joined Sea Org on the ship Apollo, then headquarters for Sea Org and for Scientology. He became an early member of the Commodore's Messenger Organization and rapidly rose in rank to head of the Office of Special Affairs.

=== Office of Special Affairs ===
As executive director of the Office of Special Affairs (OSA), Rinder was the chief spokesperson and representative of Scientology to the media for 25 years until he was replaced by Tommy Davis as spokesperson in 2005 under orders from David Miscavige. This office is responsible for overseeing public relations and legal issues for the church, as well as handling "internal investigations into members' behavior."

In a 2016 Rolling Stone recap of the second episode of Leah Remini: Scientology and the Aftermath, Rinder said of his position:

If the Church decided someone was an enemy and needed to be silenced or destroyed, it was my job and I did it ... Everything from following them 24 hours a day to having people camped outside their door, to being vilified on the internet, to following them wherever they traveled, I was the guy [that did it].

Rinder cited specific examples of this duty, saying that he personally traveled to London to prevent journalist John Sweeney, presenter of the film Scientology and Me, from attending a movie premiere and to attempt to "discredit Sweeney in any way that he could".

== Departure from Scientology ==
After years of abuse, including beatings from Miscavige and his enforcers, and being put in The Hole for over two years, Rinder "was suddenly pulled from his prison and sent on [a] mission to London to defend the Church (Note: Use of "Church" or "the Church" is a common shortened form of "Church of Scientology"; see The Church (Scientology).) against John Sweeney's film", Scientology and Me, in March 2007. He defended Scientology leader David Miscavige, but Miscavige was unhappy that Rinder was unable to stop the documentary from being shown. As a result, Rinder "was to report to the church's facility in Sussex, and dig ditches" and then was to be allowed to return to the United States.

Rinder stated that his moment of clarity came in a confrontation with the filmmaker, which was recorded on video. In the exchange, he denied Sweeney's allegation that he had been abused by Miscavige and was instructed by him to deny it happened. Rinder realized afterwards that Sweeney's allegation about him was true and he was unable to rationalize why he was denying it. Afterwards, instead of reporting to Sussex, he decided to leave Scientology.

Rinder went to Virginia and told Scientology officials that he wanted to speak to his wife and also wanted his possessions. He did not speak to his wife, but was sent a FedEx package with a check for $5,000. His family photos were not sent. Rinder's official biography has since been removed from the official Scientology website.

== Criticism of Scientology ==
After leaving Scientology, Rinder relocated to Denver, Colorado, and initially did not intend to speak out against the organization; in 2009, when the St. Petersburg Times first asked him for an interview, he declined. However, a month later, two Washington-based Scientology lawyers went to his home unannounced, informed Rinder that they knew about the newspaper's visit and asked what he had revealed. According to Rinder, this incident was another moment of clarity, because he realized he was now being subjected to Scientology's practice of fair game intimidation and harassment despite declining to speak out. He decided to do the interview with the St. Petersburg Times, and said he was speaking out because "I don't want people to continue to be hurt and tricked and lied to." He spoke about Scientology's management and the repeated abuse that he gave as well as received, and the interviews became part of the paper's "The Truth Rundown" special issue.

From then on, Rinder gave numerous interviews to journalists and participated in several documentaries about Scientology. In March 2010, he again confirmed allegations of abuse within Scientology to CNN's Anderson Cooper on Anderson Cooper 360°. On September 28, 2010, he appeared on The Secrets of Scientology broadcast by the BBC series Panorama. In 2015, he appeared in the HBO documentary entitled Going Clear: Scientology and the Prison of Belief by Alex Gibney which is based on the book by Lawrence Wright. Along with Leah Remini, Rinder co-hosted the A&E documentary series Leah Remini: Scientology and the Aftermath. He published a memoir in September 2022 titled A Billion Years: My Escape From a Life in the Highest Ranks of Scientology.

His intimate knowledge about the organization, both as a Sea Org member for 46 years and as head of OSA for 25 years, was a revelation about the organization to the world. Rinder discussed how OSA responds to critics of Scientology and stated that several events in the history of Scientology rocked the organization: the death of L. Ron Hubbard in 1986, the discovery of Operation Snow White, the rise of the Internet in the 1990s, the mobile revolution of the 2000s and the rise of social media in the 2010s. These events made it difficult for Scientology to attract new followers and retain current adherents and resulted in the Church of Scientology taking increasingly more draconian measures to ensure its survival.

=== Actions against critics ===
According to Rinder, Scientology's two principal weapons against critics within the organization are Auditing and Disconnection. Initially, auditing was meant to be a form of counseling (for which members pay over $500 per hour) to obtain the spiritual benefits of Scientology but by the time of his departure, he stated the practice had degenerated into a tool for interrogation and mind control. Non-compliant members are labelled "suppressive persons" and disconnected from by other members of Scientology, including family members.

=== Auditing ===
The device used during auditing, called an E-meter, has a disclaimer on it that says "it does nothing by itself" but members are told that it functions like a lie detector. Mike Rinder, Mark Rathbun, Marc and Claire Headley state that auditing sessions are secretly recorded, including ones with secrets about Tom Cruise and initially were forms of spiritual counseling. That changed due to the reaction by many early Scientologists to the Xenu origin of man story found in OT III. They balked at it and began leaving Scientology and encouraged others to do so as well. According to Rinder, this is where the term "suppressive person" originated from.

Rinder also stated that the prophecy of Hubbard's messiah-like return after death to prevent an apocalyptic alien invasion in OT VIII (released in 1988, two years after his death) garnered a similar response, prompting many high-ranking Scientologists to leave the organization as a result. According to Rinder, virtually all of the executives, himself included, had rejected both of the above-mentioned Scientological tenets, however they nevertheless continued to train parishioners to accept them as true.

Rinder's moment of clarity after the confrontation with Sweeney came when he realized that it was the auditing sessions that led him to deny Sweeney's allegations that he knew were true. He later discovered the training he received during those sessions was developed from a book written by Hubbard in 1955 called Brain-Washing.

=== Disconnection ===
According to Rinder, new enrollments in Scientology declined beginning in the 1970s, and total membership started declining in the 1980s as departures outstripped new followers. Without new Scientologists entering the organization, it became increasingly dependent on retaining the followers they already had. The organization's disconnection policy is the primary way it discourages Scientologists from departing and is a mechanism of emotional blackmail. All communication with any Scientologist that "blows", or has an unauthorized departure as Rinder did, is immediately ceased. Since Scientologists are not permitted to have social relationships with non-Scientologists, they essentially lose contact with all their social contacts when they leave. Sea Org members are even more vulnerable when they leave because they are financially dependent on the organization. Any Scientologist that does not disconnect from someone that leaves will be declared a suppressive person and expelled as well. This policy led to what Rinder stated are "captive" Scientologists – members who stay not because they are faithful to the tenets but because they fear disconnection – and cites Leah Remini's mother as an example of this because she stated she wanted to leave Scientology prior to Remini's departure but delayed doing so because she did not want to be disconnected from the rest of her family.

Rinder stated that the policy of "routing out", or authorized departure, is a sham. The Church of Scientology claims that anyone can voluntarily leave, or route out, and not be declared by paying a fee for leaving but in reality everyone that leaves gets declared by policy because they will have access to the internet after leaving and any parishioner who remains in contact with them will also have unauthorized access as well.

After leaving Scientology in 2007, Rinder and his first wife, Cathy, divorced after 35 years, and he had no contact with her or his two adult children from his first marriage because of disconnection. In April 2010, Rinder, who lived in Clearwater, Florida, attempted to meet his son, who was also living in Clearwater, after learning he was diagnosed with cancer, but his son refused to see him. The organization also refused to let him onto the property and had him cited for trespassing by the Clearwater Police. Rinder stated his biggest regrets in life is having two children that were born into Scientology and having enforced the disconnection policy (to which he was being subjected) when he was director of OSA.

He stated the rise of social media in the late 2000s allowed ex-Scientologists to connect with each other and form support groups for members who have left or want to leave. He credited the disconnection policy for the consistently negative media portrayal of Scientology. The reports of Scientology extracting large fees and their space opera beliefs were controversial, but their portrayal didn't become consistently negative until ex-Scientologists started sharing their stories through social media about families intentionally being broken up by disconnection because a family member decided to leave (or was not a member of) of Scientology.

=== Fair Game tactics ===
Rinder stated that his primary role as director of the Office of Special Affairs was defending Scientology against critics by employing its Fair Game tactics, which are essentially to "intimidate, defame, harass, discredit, and effectively silence any criticism of Scientology". He and fellow defector Marty Rathbun, former head of the Religious Technology Center, revealed through these interviews how this was done. For instance, Rinder told the St. Petersburg Times that Scientology critic Bob Minton ceased his criticism of Scientology after Rinder discovered "things that, really, he was worried about and had caused problems for him in the investigation that we had done" and that they had reached a private settlement. Rinder regretted his role in that investigation and stated he considered Minton a friend at the time of Minton's death in January 2010.

Both have said the policy was backfiring because victims, such as John Sweeney, reported their experiences with Fair Game and this led to more negative publicity and thus produced more critics than they were silencing. Rinder's own decision to speak out against Scientology is an example of this as well because he decided to speak out against Scientology after being victimized by Fair Game despite not criticizing Scientology after leaving.

Rinder was harassed by Scientologists numerous times and recalled an incident where he was sitting in his car at a doctor's office parking lot during a phone interview with BBC journalist John Sweeney when "five senior members of [Scientology's] California-based international management team – surrounded and screamed at him". The screaming was so loud, Sweeney was able to record the episode and later aired the recording on The Secrets of Scientology broadcast by the BBC's Panorama program.

The policy was becoming increasingly ineffective starting the 1980s as it was unable to stop publication of A Piece of Blue Sky by ex-Scientologist Jon Atack or the documentary Scientology and Me which ultimately led to Rinder's departure. The internet made it even less effective because information can be uploaded anonymously and then viewed by anyone with internet access.

Rinder said that Fair Game's most significant failure came with the discovery of Operation Snow White by the FBI. The Church organized an illegal infiltration of 136 government agencies because of the IRS' refusal to reinstate the organization's tax exempt status. The FBI raid that ensued led to the discovery of hundreds of documents detailing criminal activity by the Church, and dozens of its high-ranking officials were prosecuted. But according to Rinder, David Miscavige's claim that Fair Game succeeded in regaining Scientology's tax-exempt status in 1993 is untrue. It was reinstated, he said, because Scientology abandoned its Fair Game practices against the IRS after Hubbard's death, and instead followed the IRS policy for obtaining tax-exempt status. According to Rinder, Scientology never recovered from the FBI raid, because it provided documentary evidence to support critics' claims. This was also the primary source of information used in the article, The Thriving Cult of Greed and Power published by Time magazine in 1991.

=== Vexatious litigation ===
After the FBI raid, Rinder said that Fair Game tactics had to be changed. Intimidation tactics were still used, but took the form of vexatious litigation. Rinder stated this was effective at silencing organizations from disseminating information critical of Scientology, and kept the public relatively unaware of information seized during the FBI raid. However, the 1991 Time magazine article, "The Thriving Cult of Greed and Power", and the litigation that followed it ended this secrecy. The year before Scientology sued Time magazine for defamation, the Church was successful at shutting down the Cult Awareness Network (CAN) by suing the group.

However, unlike CAN, the Time Warner Corporation had the resources to defend itself, as well as the documents obtained from the earlier FBI raid. Time Warner was able to successfully prove that Scientology's lawsuit was vexatious in nature, and that it was meant to financially drain critics into submission rather than to resolve any actual dispute. Additionally, the discovery process allowed for the subpoena of Church documents, which exposed the Church's litigation policies. As a result, the Church lost its lawsuit against Time Warner. In the aftermath of the lawsuit, courts were less receptive to litigation brought by the Church because its abuse of the legal system was well documented. The Church of Scientology spent approximately seven million dollars in an attempt to discredit Time's article, which ultimately had the effect of drawing more attention to Scientology and public criticism of its practices. According to Rinder, the Time Warner lawsuit was ultimately responsible for "shattering the cone of silence" around Scientology.

In the decade that followed, criticism of Scientology became bolder, more public and consistently negative. In the early 1990s, when the Internet was in its infancy, internet startups could be intimidated by the threat of litigation by the Church. But a decade later, those same companies were now large corporations with the resources to defend themselves. They successfully lobbied for legislation that shielded them with "loser pays" laws that would indemnify the Church if it lost a lawsuit, and anti-SLAPP laws that prohibited the Church from using lawsuits to financially drain a critic into submission. Although Scientology continued to sue individual critics, defendants began using discovery to introduce documents of secret doctrine into evidence, making them part of the public record, and thus viewable by anyone. An example of this was the 1993 case Church of Scientology International v. Fishman and Geertz.

== Awards and charitable work ==
In 2018, Rinder co-founded The Aftermath Foundation, a nonprofit which helps people escape from Scientology, and connects former Sea Org members with housing, work and other support upon leaving the Church. He was a board member of the Foundation. After his death, the board unanimously agreed to change the name in his honor to The Michael J. Rinder Aftermath Foundation.

Rinder was co-executive producer of the show Leah Remini: Scientology and the Aftermath in 2019 and 2020 when the show was nominated for the Emmy Awards, winning an Emmy for Outstanding Hosted Nonfiction Series Or Special – 2020.

In 2019, CHILD USA awarded Rinder and Leah Remini the Barbara Blaine Trailblazer Award for having "taken a brave, public stand for justice and given voice to many of Scientology's victims." Rinder sat on the CHILD USA board of directors where he helped to "[change] the laws in numerous states across the US with legislation enacted to make it possible for victims to pursue their day in court."

== Personal life and death ==
Rinder had two children with his first wife, Cathy; daughter Taryn and son Benjamin. A second daughter died shortly after her birth in 1982. In 2012, his wife, Christie King Collbran, gave birth to the couple's son. In 2013, Rinder and Christie married and he became stepfather to her older son. According to his blog, he last lived in Palm Harbor, Florida, with his wife, son and stepson.

In June 2023, it was announced that Rinder had developed advanced esophageal cancer. He died from cancer at a Palm Harbor hospice facility, on January 5, 2025, at the age of 69. Tracey McManus, who covered Scientology for the Tampa Bay Times (2015–2024), said that Rinder was "an invaluable resource for journalists" and that "with Mike's death, the world lost institutional knowledge about a secretive organization that continues to impact people's lives. But he leaves a legacy that will continue to play a role in the understanding of Scientology for decades to come."

== Books ==
- Rinder, Mike (2022). A Billion Years: My Escape From a Life in the Highest Ranks of Scientology. Simon and Schuster. ISBN 9781982185763.
