= Office of Special Affairs =

Department of the Church of Scientology

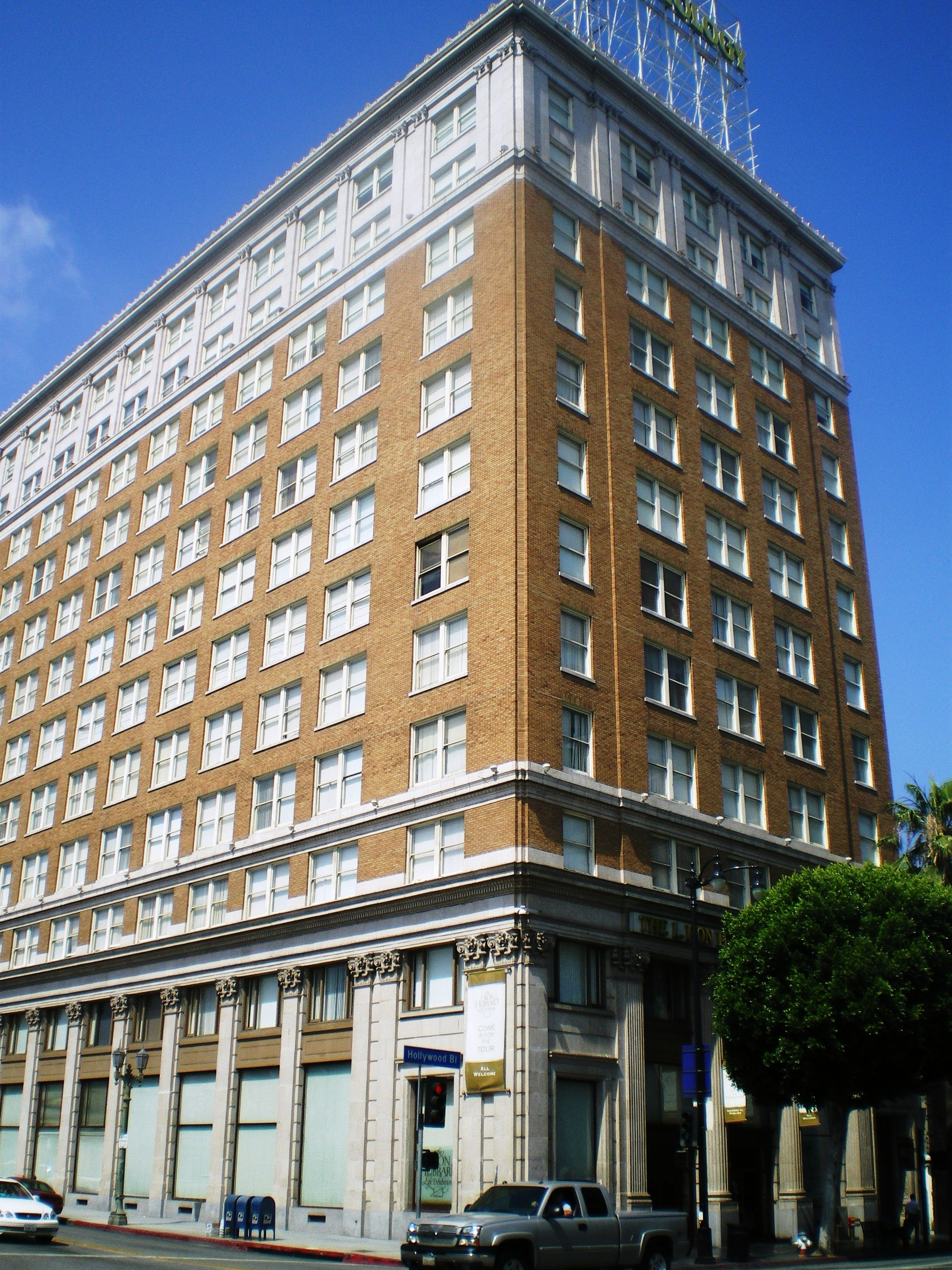
- The Office of Special Affairs' headquarters are located in the Hollywood Guaranty Building in Hollywood, Los Angeles, CA
- Predecessor: Guardian's Office (1966–1983)
- Formation: 1983
- Headquarters: Hollywood, Los Angeles, CA, United States
- Services: Legal affairs and public relations
- Chairman of the Board RTC: David Miscavige
- Parent organization: Church of Scientology

The Office of Special Affairs (OSA), formerly the Guardian's Office (GO), is a department of the Church of Scientology International. According to the Church, the OSA is responsible for directing legal affairs, public relations, pursuing investigations, publicizing the Church's "social betterment works," and "oversee[ing its] social reform programs". Some observers outside the Church have characterized the department as an intelligence agency, comparing it variously to the CIA or the KGB. (Note: Quotation (German): Das GO ist ein weltweites Netz von Tausenden speziell ausgebildeter und völlig fanatischer Agenten und Detektive, es ist in seiner Arbeitsweise dem CIA und dem KGB in hohem Maße vergleichbar. (English): The Guardian's Office is a highly trained and totally fanatical worldwide network of thousands of agents and operatives, similar in function to the C.I.A. or K.G.B.) The department has targeted critics of the Church with dead agent operations and character assassination.

OSA is the successor to the now-defunct Guardian's Office, which was responsible for Operation Snow White and Operation Freakout.

== History ==
=== Guardian's Office ===
The Guardian's Office was established in 1966, and its initial mission was to protect the interests of the Church of Scientology, and gather information on agencies and individuals deemed enemies of the organization. The Guardian's Office was also charged with internal monitoring of current Scientologists, in particular heretics and notable defectors. L. Ron Hubbard put his wife Mary Sue Hubbard in charge of the Guardian's Office, and it was initially headquartered at Saint Hill Manor in England and grew to 1,100 staff around the world.

The Guardian's Office functioned effectively as an intelligence bureau of the Church of Scientology, and planted members in key positions within federal government agencies, in order to obtain confidential material. Most branches of the Church of Scientology soon had at least one member from the Guardian's Office on its staff, and the Guardian's Office itself had its own secret Intelligence Bureau at the top of its organizational structure.

According to former GO staff member Michael Meisner, "The Guardian's Office is charged with the protection of Scientology. The Guardians handle intelligence matters including covert operations to acquire government documents critical of Scientology, internal security within Scientology, and covert operations to discredit and remove from positions of power all persons whom Scientology considers to be its enemies."

The Guardian's Office was disbanded in 1983, and the bulk of its previous functions were then assigned to the Office of Special Affairs.

=== Office of Special Affairs ===
OSA is in Department 20 (Department of Special Affairs) in the Scientology organizational chart, same as the Guardian's Office was. The most recently known Commanding Officer for OSA International is Linda Hamel, succeeding Mike Rinder, who left the Church of Scientology and became a fierce critic of the organization, appearing as a co-host on Leah Remini: Scientology and the Aftermath.

== OSA Network ==
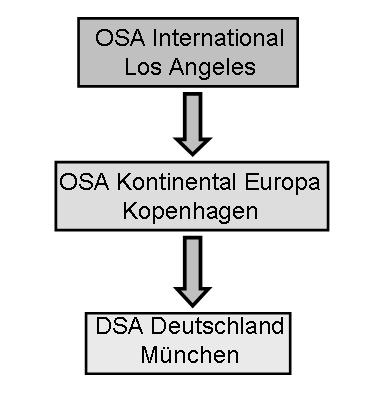
The command channels of OSA start with OSA Int, pushing orders down to the continental office, then down to Directors of Special Affairs in individual organizations

At local Scientology organizations, directors of the departments for Special Affairs, Legal, and Public Affairs are all staff members from OSA and report directly to OSA superiors instead of local church executives. OSA members sent to local churches are known as Directors of Special Affairs, or DSAs. Members of the Office of Special Affairs are drawn from the Sea Org.

The headquarters of OSA are currently located on the top floor of the Hollywood Guaranty Building on Hollywood Boulevard in Los Angeles, California.

=== Volunteers ===
In addition to regular staff, some church members also act as volunteer collaborators for the office, which cuts down on expenses for hiring private investigators and doing legal research. Some volunteers participate under the notion that they receive special "ethics protection". In one case a volunteer who read critical information about Scientology on the internet was led to believe that he would be unable to continue receiving services unless he performed a series of investigations for OSA.

== Methods ==
Garry Scarff (Note: Garry Scarff (1956-2017) was later known for his extensive research into Scientology and for his active participation in online discussions under the name "Happy Smurf". An obituary by journalist Tony Ortega describes him as "a complex figure" and "one of the most dedicated researchers into Scientology" he had met. Scarff was also involved in testimony in the Jason Scott cases of 1993-1995.) has said that he used to be an OSA operative. He has made a number of statements about the inner workings of OSA. In a sworn deposition taken between July and August 1993 and submitted in Church of Scientology International vs. Steven Fishman and Uwe Geertz, Scarff testified, "...I was directed, one, to go to Chicago, Illinois and to murder Cynthia Kisser, Cynthia Kisser being the Executive Director of the Cult Awareness Network, by a staged car accident." Kisser was not killed, and Scarff said: "I could not bring myself to harm or kill anybody." Scarff repeated these allegations in subsequent interviews and in a 1997 German television documentary. A 1998 report from the State Office for the Protection of the Constitution of Hamburg summarizes his sworn testimony, including claims that he had committed criminal acts on behalf of OSA and had been instructed to obtain information on Scientology critics and to participate in planned attacks on opponents. The report also notes that Scarff later issued a statement retracting many of his earlier claims and asserting that he was not a credible witness, while further reporting that Scarff subsequently told his attorney that the retraction had been coerced and that he had been placed under duress. (Note: Quotation (German): Wenig später kehrte er jedoch zu seinem Rechtsanwalt Graham E. BERRY zurück und berichtete davon, daß er von der SO gefangengehalten und unter Druck gesetzt worden sei. Sein Widerruf sei erpreßt worden. (English): A short time later, however, he went back to his attorney, Graham E. BERRY, and reported that he had been held by the SO and put under duress. He said the retraction of his testimony had been coerced.)

Tory Christman, a former volunteer for OSA has stated that the organization hired private investigators, fabricated criminal charges and harassed their targets, including at their place of employment, as well as their family members. Christman also told The Register that OSA "has organized massive efforts to remove Scientology-related materials and criticism from the web" and that "the guys I worked with posted every day all day [...] to refute any facts from the internet about the Church of Scientology".

Bonnie Woods, a former member who began counselling people involved with Scientology and their families, became a target along with her husband in 1993 when the Church of Scientology started a leaflet operation denouncing her as a "hate campaigner" with demonstrators outside their home and around East Grinstead in England. She and her family were followed by a private investigator, and a creditor of theirs was located and provided free legal assistance to sue them into bankruptcy. After a long battle of libel suits, in 1999 the church agreed to issue an apology and pay £55,000 damages and £100,000 costs to the Woods.

Nancy Many was a high-level GO operative during Operation Freakout, and in a 2013 television interview for Dangerous Persuasions on the Discovery Channel, described intimate details of the operation to harass Paulette Cooper, including her own personal involvement. In the documentary she also explicitly confirmed the existence of "The Messianic Program", a GO interrogation program designed specifically to test the subjects reaction to the teaching that L. Ron Hubbard was "on level with Jesus and Buddha". This program was only ever administered to trusted GO agents by their superiors, and never to outside Scientologists, indicating its extremely classified nature.

Among the targets of OSA operations are Free Zone groups.

== See also ==
- Scientology ethics and justice
- Fair game (Scientology)
- List of Guardian's Office operations
- Scientology and public relations
- Karin Pouw
- Mike Rinder § Office of Special Affairs
- Kurt Weiland
- Mark Ingber
