= Scientology in New Zealand =

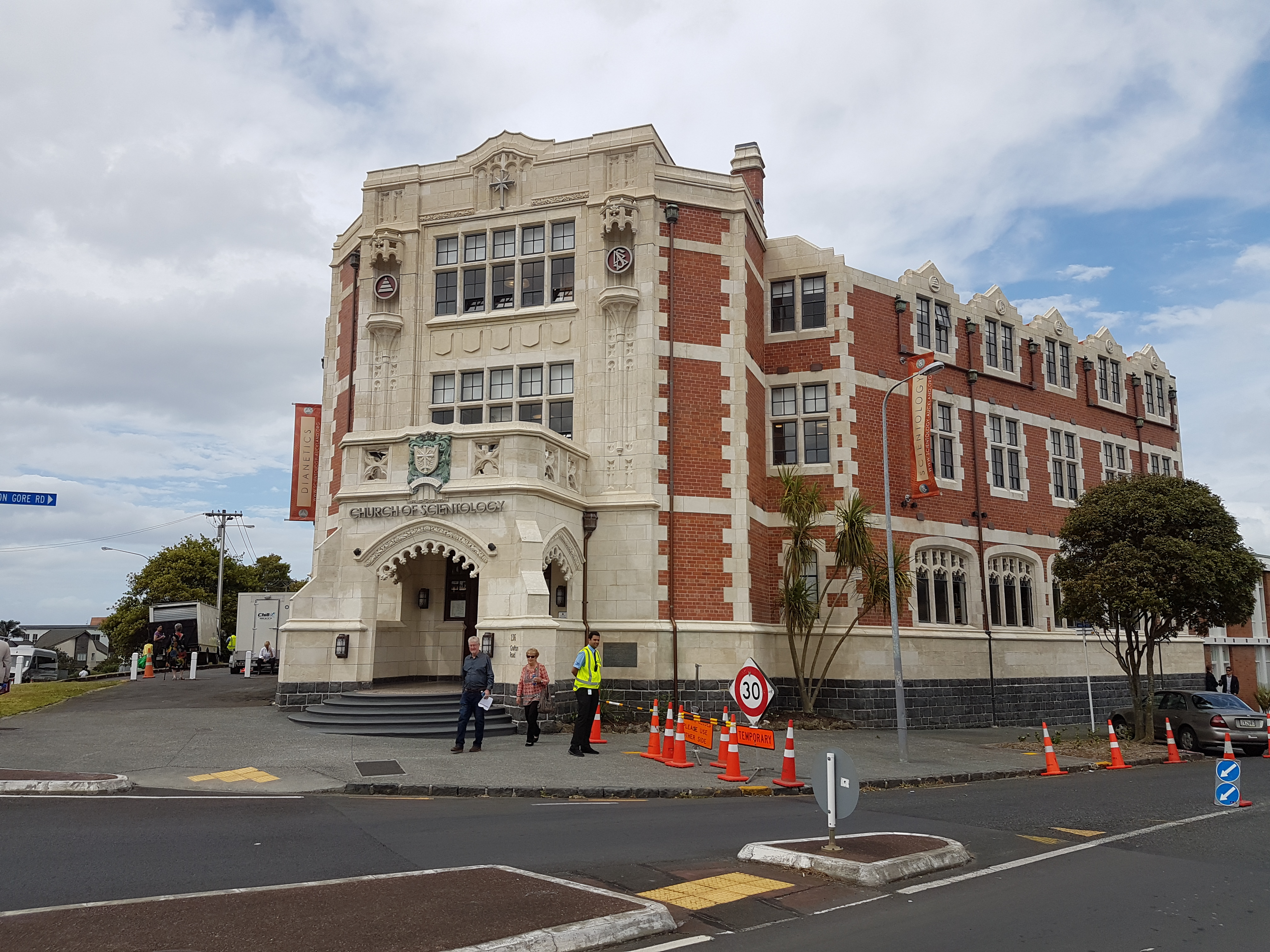
The Church of Scientology of Auckland in Grafton

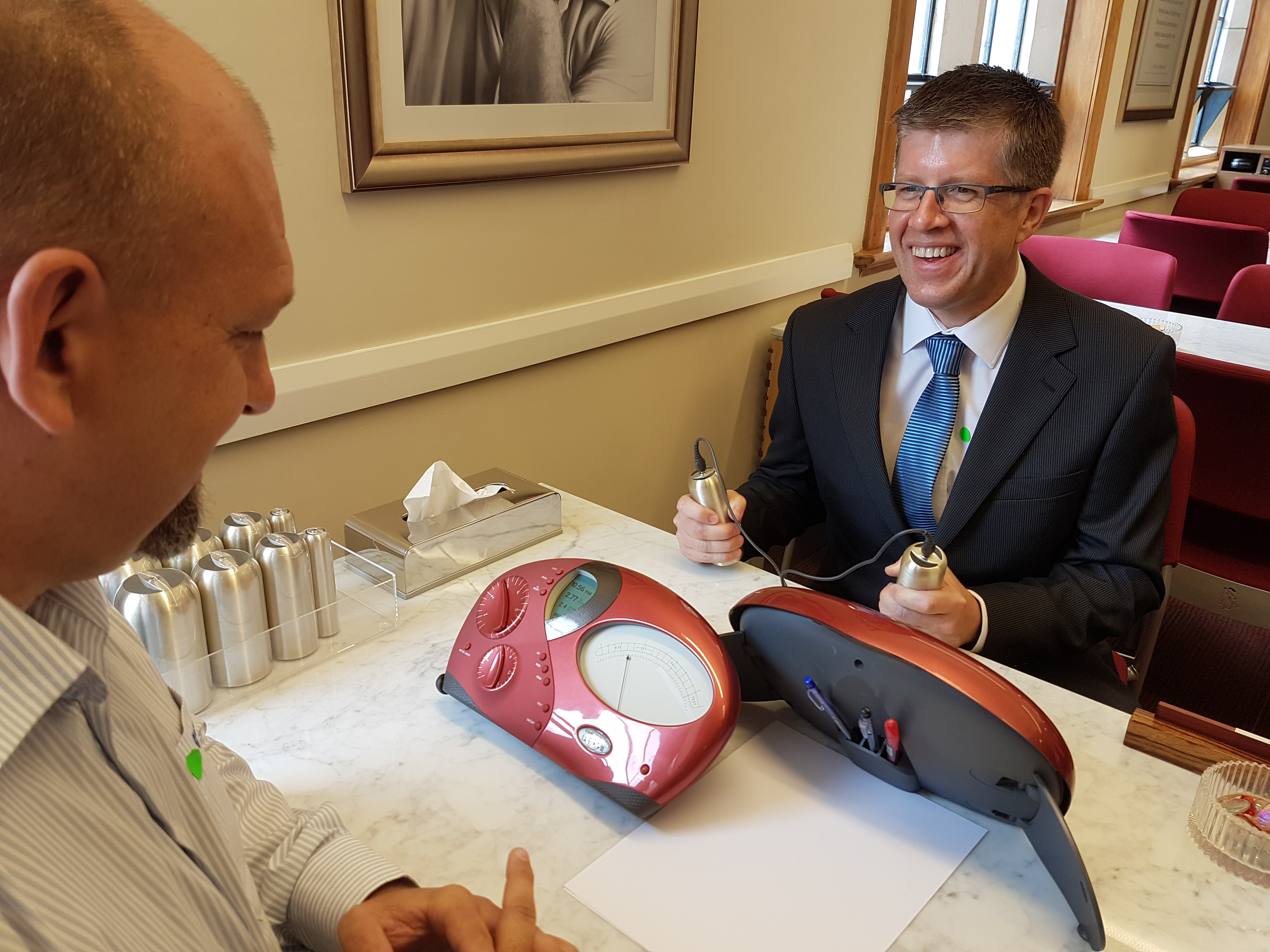
An e-meter demonstration at the opening of the Church of Scientology of Auckland in 2017

Scientology has been established in New Zealand since 1955. The Inland Revenue Department granted charitable status to the Church of Scientology in 2002 for tax purposes, and the Church is registered as a charity. Census records show there are a few hundred Scientologists in New Zealand.

== History ==
Scientology was introduced to New Zealand by Frank Turnbull, who in 1953 flew from Christchurch to Philadelphia to train as a Scientologist. While there, he met L. Ron Hubbard and was ordained the "Scientology Bishop of Oceania."

The New Zealand branch was founded in Auckland in 1955 under the name "The Church of American Science Inc.", and in 2002 the Inland Revenue Department declared the Church of Scientology a charity, and it was registered with the Charities Commission in 2008.

=== Dumbleton–Powles Report ===
In 1968, a petition with 716 signatures called on the Parliament of New Zealand to set up a board of inquiry into Scientology. The Commission of Inquiry into the Hubbard Scientology organisation in New Zealand issued public notice that it would hear evidence in Auckland and Wellington in March and April 1969. The commission aimed to "hear about and examine cases where it is said that Scientology has in New Zealand led to the estrangement of families, affected the control of persons under 21, or put unreasonable pressure upon former Scientologists who have left it, or other persons".

After hearing evidence, the Commission found against Scientology, concluding that "the activities, methods, and practices of Scientology did result in persons being subjected to improper or unreasonable pressures". However, on receiving assurances that Scientology would change its practices, the Commission recommended that, subject to those assurances, no immediate action be taken against Scientology.

The findings were published as the Dumbleton–Powles Report, authored by E.V. Dumbleton and Sir Guy Richardson Powles, and published on 30 June 1969.

=== Whitecliffe Campus ===
In 2007, the Church of Scientology bought the heritage-listed Grafton building formerly occupied by Whitecliffe College of Arts and Design for ten million dollars. It was reported that the Church spent a further six million dollars on renovations. The building was opened on 21 January 2017 by David Miscavige.

== Members ==
The New Zealand census collects religious affiliation data every five years. In 1991 there were 207 Scientologists, and in 2001 there were 282. The 2006 census recorded 357 people affiliated to the Church of Scientology. The 2013 census showed 318 people identified with Scientology, 321 in the 2018 census, and 315 in the 2023 census. A 2016 interview with head of NZ Scientology, Mike Ferriss, claimed the Church had "about 3,500 that have had some involvement in the Church in recent times", and 30,000 being involved with the Church of Scientology since it was established in 1955.

== Controversies ==
In 2008 a protest against the church as part of Project Chanology was held in some parts of New Zealand by "Anonymous", a world-wide group that has concerns about internet censorship by Scientologists.

In 2012, it was reported that the Church of Scientology was receiving government grants to publish and distribute anti-drug pamphlets, and run rehabilitative services. The head of the New Zealand Drug Foundation called their practices "quackery" and disapproved of the Church getting the funding.

During the COVID-19 pandemic in New Zealand the Church of Scientology distributed 50,000 pamphlets in Auckland called Stay Well which were branded in similar colours to the New Zealand Government's COVID-19 branding. This led to some criticism, with some accusing the Church of capitalising on the pandemic to distribute religious material for their organisation in a deceptive manner. However, the Church of Scientology defended their pamphlet and distribution, saying that they had used this branding before the pandemic had started and that the pamphlet was clearly labelled as a Scientology publication

== See also ==
- Religion in New Zealand
