= McKinney v University of Guelph =

Supreme Court of Canada Charter case

- Supreme Court of Canada

Hearing: May 16–17, 1989 Judgment: December 6, 1990
- Full case name: David Walter McKinney, Jr v Board of Governors of the University of Guelph and the Attorney General for Ontario; Horacio Roque-Nunez v Board of Governors of Laurentian University and the Attorney General for Ontario; Syed Ziauddin v Board of Governors of Laurentian University and the Attorney General for Ontario; John A Buttrick v Board of Governors of York University and the Attorney General for Ontario; Bernard Blishen v Board of Governors of York University and the Attorney General for Ontario; Tillo E Kuhn v Board of Governors of York University and the Attorney General for Ontario; Hollis Rinehart, on his own behalf and on behalf of all other members of the York University Faculty Association v Board of Governors of York University and the Attorney General for Ontario; Ritvars Bregzis v Governing Council of the University of Toronto and the Attorney General for Ontario; Norman Zacour v Governing Council of the University of Toronto and the Attorney General for Ontario
- Citations: [1990] 3 SCR 229
- Prior history: Appeal from 1987 CanLII 179 (ON CA), dismissing an appeal from 1986 CanLII 2832 (ON SC)
- Ruling: Appeal dismissed, Wilson and L'Heureux-Dubé dissenting.

Court membership
- Chief Justice: Brian Dickson; Puisne Justices: Antonio Lamer, Bertha Wilson, Gérard La Forest, Claire L'Heureux-Dubé, John Sopinka, Charles Gonthier, Peter Cory, Beverley McLachlin

Reasons given
- Plurality: La Forest; Dickson and Gonthier concurring
- Concurrence: Sopinka
- Concurrence: Cory
- Dissent: Wilson
- Dissent: L'Heureux-Dubé
- Lamer and McLachlin took no part in the consideration or decision of the case.

McKinney v University of Guelph [1990] 3 SCR 229 is the Supreme Court of Canada case that decided that, for the purpose of determining the application of the Canadian Charter of Rights and Freedoms, universities were not part of government. Therefore, the mandatory retirement age for university teachers did not violate equality rights under section 15 of the Charter. In reaching this holding, the Court refined the scope of the Charter as it applies to government bodies as well as the definition of "law" within the ambit of the Charter.

== Background ==
Three years prior to McKinney, the Court held in Retail, Wholesale and Department Store Union, Local 580 v Dolphin Delivery Ltd that the Charter only applied to the government but without defining what constitutes "government".

Eight professors and one librarian from the University of Guelph applied for declarations that the university's policy for mandatory retirement at age 65 as well as the Ontario Human Rights Code, which allowed such policies, were unconstitutional because it violated their section 15 Charter rights to equality.

The issues before the court were:

1. whether the Canadian Charter of Rights and Freedoms applies to universities;
2. if the Charter does apply to universities, whether mandatory retirement policies violate s. 15;
3. whether the limitation of the prohibition against age discrimination in the Ontario Human Rights Code to persons between the ages of 18 and 65 violates s. 15; and
4. if the limitation does violate s. 15, whether it is justifiable under s. 1 as a reasonable limit on an equality right.

== Reasons of the court ==
=== La Forest ===
La Forest wrote reasons for the plurality, with Dickson and Gonthier concurring. In similar fashion from Dolphin Delivery, he looked at the meaning of section 32 to determine the purpose of the Charter, concluding it is a tool for checking the powers of the government over the individual. He further stated that if the scope were so widely read as to include private actions, it would impose too much a burden on the courts and would result in too much overlap with common law rules and statutes.

La Forest then considered whether the university was a government body, and concluded that the public purpose test alluded to in Dolphin Delivery was not determinative. The fact the university was created by statute and received a significant portion of its funding from government was insufficient. Nor was the fact it was regulated by government and fulfilled a public service sufficient. La Forest noted that universities still function as autonomous bodies and the government had no direct power to control the school. Instead, the university is governed by a Board of Governors which is not the representative of government.

The conclusion that the Charter did not apply directly to the university was not the end of the analysis. Section 9(a) of the Ontario Human Rights ode provided that mandatory retirement was an exception to the prohibition on age discrimination set out in the Code. La Forest examined whether that exemption infringed the Charter. La Forest concluded that all actions pursuant to powers granted by law, not merely statutes, would be subject to Charter scrutiny.

He found that the exemption in the Code was itself discriminatory and infringed section 15, because a distinction based on age discriminated against those who were old but capable of working. However, the infringement was justified under section 1 due to the public necessity to have new teachers hired.

La Forest therefore concluded that the appeal should be dismissed.

=== Wilson ===
Wilson dissented. On the question of the application of the Charter, she examined a broad range of sources and proposed several tests, including a "control test", a "government function test" and a "government entity test". She concluded that universities carry on an important public function and were subject to the Charter.

In her Charter analysis, she concluded that the university's retirement policy was discriminatory, contrary to section 15. That infringement could not be justified under section 1. She therefore would have allowed the appeal.

=== L'Heureux-Dubé ===
L'Heureux-Dubé also dissented. She took the position that universities are not subject to the Charter for the reasons outlined by La Forest. However, that was not determinative. Section 9(a) of the Ontario Human Rights Code was also in issue. That section stated that mandatory retirement was not age discrimination under the Code. L'Heureux-Dubé concluded that provision was discriminatory, contrary to section 15 of the Charter, and could not be justified under section 1. That meant that mandatory retirement based on age infringed the Human Rights Code. She would have allowed the appeal on that basis.

=== Sopinka ===
Sopinka agreed with La Forest's conclusion that universities were not part of "government" for the purpose of the Charter, and therefore the appeal should be dismissed. He did not agree with the need for the analysis under section 15 or section 1.

=== Cory ===
Cory agreed with much of Wilson's reasons, but concluded that the infringement of section 15 could be justified under section 1 of the Charter. He therefore agreed the appeal should be dismissed.

== See also ==
- List of Supreme Court of Canada cases (Lamer Court)
