= Scientology and law =

Church of Scientology legal cases

Scientology has an extensive and complex history with the law in many countries, involving criminal prosecutions, civil litigation, regulatory actions, and cases concerning religious recognition. Scientology spokespeople state that its litigation is intended to protect its religious freedom and intellectual property, while critics and some courts have described its use of the legal system as abusive and overly aggressive.

== Overview ==
The Church of Scientology and its related organizations has been involved in numerous court disputes across the world. In some cases, when the Church (Note: Use of "Church" or "the Church" is a common shortened form of "Church of Scientology"; see The Church (Scientology).) has initiated the dispute, questions have been raised as to its motives. The Church of Scientology says that its use of the legal system is necessary to protect its intellectual property and its right to freedom of religion. Critics say that most of the organization's legal claims are designed to harass those who criticize it and its manipulative business practices.

In the years since its inception, the Church of Scientology's lawsuits have numbered in the thousands—filed against newspapers, magazines, government agencies (including the United States tax collecting unit, the IRS), and many individuals. In 1991, Time magazine estimated that the Church spends an average of about $20 million per year on various legal actions, and it is the exclusive client of several law firms. According to a U.S. District Court Memorandum of Decision in 1993, Religious Technology Center had "abused the federal court system by using it, inter alia, to destroy their opponents, rather than to resolve an actual dispute over trademark law or any other legal matter. This constitutes 'extraordinary, malicious, wanton, and oppressive conduct.' ... It is abundantly clear that plaintiffs sought to harass the individual defendants and destroy the church defendants through massive over-litigation and other highly questionable litigation tactics. The Special Master has never seen a more glaring example of bad faith litigation than this." Rulings such as this have classified the Church of Scientology as a chronically vexatious litigant. Legal disputes initiated by Scientology against its former members, the media or others include the following:

- Religious discrimination cases, including recognition as a religious organization.
- Copyright infringement cases. Scientology's religious documents are copyrighted, and many are available only to members who pay for higher levels of courses and auditing.
- Libel and slander cases.

In the past, the Church has been the defendant in criminal cases (for example, in United States v. Hubbard), and increasingly, lawsuits are being brought by former Church members against the Church, such as:

- human trafficking and forced labor (Claire and Mark Headley v. Church of Scientology International)
- fraud and misrepresentation
- libel (e.g. Hill v Church of Scientology of Toronto).

== Criminal prosecutions ==
=== 1978 — France: Hubbard illegal practices conviction ===
In 1978, L. Ron Hubbard, creator of Scientology, was convicted for illegal business practices, namely, making false claims about his ability to cure physical illnesses. He was sentenced in absentia to four years in prison, which was never served.

=== 1979 — US: senior officials, government-infiltration convictions ===
In a 1979 criminal case against 11 high-ranking Church officials regarding Operation Snow White, the largest then-known program of domestic espionage in U.S. history, all were convicted.

=== 1988–2002 — Spain: arrest and trial of international president ===
In 1988, Jentzsch was arrested in Spain along with 69 other members of Scientology. Jentzsch was incarcerated in a Spanish jail for about three weeks. He was released and fled to the United States after Scientology paid a bail bond of approximately $1 million. Sixteen people, including Jentzsch, were charged with "illegal association" and various other crimes including tax fraud and endangering public health. The trial of the indictees began in February 2001, but Jentzsch himself did not appear; the prosecution called for him to be given a 56-year prison sentence. However, the Madrid Provincial Court dismissed all but the conspiracy charge and eventually ruled (in absentia) that the prosecution had presented insufficient evidence to prove this charge as well, and in April 2002, the last charge was formally dropped.

=== 1992 — Canada: fraud and public-trust breach ===
In R v Church of Scientology of Toronto (1992), the Church of Scientology was convicted on two charges of breaching the public trust and fined $250,000, and seven members were convicted on various charges. The case was brought to light after the USA FBI raids in the 1970s on Church of Scientology properties resulted in the discovery of stolen Canadian records, followed by a Canadian raid on the Toronto property and the discovery of 250,000 documents in more than 900 boxes.

According to court records, Scientology's Guardian Office in Toronto ran a spy ring from 1974 to 1976 that infiltrated Revenue Canada, the Royal Canadian Mounted Police, the Ontario Provincial Police, Metro Police, the provincial attorney general's office, the Canadian Mental Health Association, the Ontario Medical Association and two law firms.

This prosecution later gave rise to the civil libel action Hill v Church of Scientology of Toronto (1995), in which Justice Casey Hill successfully sued the organization for defamatory statements made during the course of the criminal proceedings.

=== 1996 — France: fraud and involuntary homicide ===
In 1996, Jean-Jacques Mazier, then head of the Church of Scientology of Lyons, was convicted of fraud and involuntary homicide, and sentenced to 18 months in prison plus 18 months suspended and fined $100,000. Fourteen of 22 others charged with frauds were also convicted. The manslaughter charge was in connection with the 1988 death of Patrice Vic, who killed himself by jumping from a 12th-floor apartment after being pressured to borrow money to pay for yet another Scientology service. The victim's widow said her husband had been "subjected to psychological torture". Related to this trial, two other Scientologists were convicted in Toulon for threatening a psychiatrist and expert witness in the trial.

=== 1996–2000 — Florida: death of Lisa McPherson ===
When the Church was charged with a felony count of practicing medicine without a license in the 1996 case in connection with the 1995 death of Scientologist Lisa McPherson, Florida asked for damages of approximately $15,000 to be awarded against the organization. The Church hired law firms and medical specialists at an estimated cost of over $1 million, waging a defense that eventually resulted in the criminal charges being dismissed due to lack of credible evidence. In a separate civil case, the Church paid an undisclosed amount to settle a wrongful death suit brought on behalf of McPherson's estate.

=== 1997 — France: fraud ===
In a case in Lyons in 1997, six Scientologists were given suspended prison sentences for fraud.

=== 1998 — Switzerland: fraud and usury ===
In 1998, three Scientologists were convicted and jailed on fraud and usury charges after conning a member out of $80,000 for courses.

=== 1999 — France: fraud ===
In 1999, a Marseille court found five senior officials of the Church of Scientology guilty of fraud for "sham purification treatments" in Nice and Marseille. Xavier Delamare was sentenced to two years, partially deferred, and received a fine. Four others received suspended sentences of six months to two years, and two more were found not guilty.

=== 2009 — France: organized fraud ===
In 2009, a case went to trial in France, after a woman claims to have been pressured into paying €21,000 ($29,400) to the Church of Scientology for lessons, books and medicines for her poor mental state, accusing the Church of Scientology of "organised fraud". Her lawyers argue that the Church systematically seeks to make money through mental pressure and use scientifically dubious cures. Coincidentally, a large scale simplification of the laws in France occurred just prior to the beginning of the trial. Suspicion was raised as the new law revision forbids the dissolution of a legal entity, an unadvertised change among hundreds of others. Dissolution was the main sentence requested by the prosecutor against the Church of Scientology in this trial, becoming unlawful as the law changed. On October 27, 2009, a verdict was rendered: six members of the CoS in France, and the Church itself, were convicted of fraud. Four of these, including Alain Rosenberg, were given suspended prison sentences. The Scientology Celebrity Center in Paris, a Scientology bookstore, and all six individual convicts were ordered to pay fines. The plaintiff's request for dissolution of the Church was not fulfilled.

== Civil lawsuits against Scientology ==
=== 1993–1999 — England: Bonnie Woods libel litigation ===
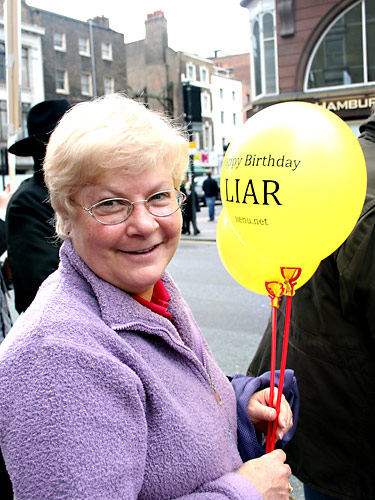
Woods in March 2008

Bonnie Woods is an American former Scientologist and critic of the Church of Scientology based in England. A former member of Scientology's Sea Org, she left in 1982 and later became known for supporting families affected by Scientology through a telephone helpline she ran with her husband. Woods was declared a "suppressive person" by the Church and became the subject of surveillance, picketing, and a leaflet campaign in her local community. She initiated libel proceedings against the Church, which in turn filed multiple suits against her. After six years of litigation (1993–1999), the case reached the High Court of Justice, where in 1999 the Church of Scientology admitted in open court that its allegations about her were false and paid damages and costs.

=== 1995 — Canada: Hill v Church of Scientology of Toronto ===
In Hill v Church of Scientology of Toronto (1995), Justice Casey Hill, at that time a Crown attorney involved in the R. v. Church of Scientology of Toronto case, sued and won CAD$1,600,000 for libel, the largest libel damage award in Canadian history. During the case, it was shown that a file had been kept on him as an "Enemy Canada". In their decision, the Supreme Court of Canada found:

In this case, there was ample evidence upon which the jury could properly base their finding of aggravated damages. The existence of the file on Casey Hill under the designation "Enemy Canada" was evidence of the malicious intention of Scientology to "neutralize" him. The press conference was organized in such a manner as to ensure the widest possible dissemination of the libel. Scientology continued with the contempt proceedings although it knew its allegations were false. In its motion to remove Hill from the search warrant proceedings, it implied that he was not trustworthy and might act in those proceedings in a manner that would benefit him in his libel action. It pleaded justification or truth of its statement when it knew it to be false. It subjected Hill to a demeaning cross-examination and, in its address to the jury, depicted Hill as a manipulative actor.

=== 1997–2004 — Florida: wrongful death of Lisa McPherson ===
On May 29, 2004, the Church paid an undisclosed amount to settle a wrongful death suit brought on behalf of McPherson's estate. This was separate from the criminal case filed against the Church of Scientology by the State of Florida. In an article on the civil suit, it describes legal attacks made by Scientology's attorneys:

[McPherson family attorney Ken] Dandar has persevered through a seemingly endless barrage of legal attacks. There have been nine attempts to disqualify him, and four attempts to remove Lisa's aunt, Dell Liebreich, as executor of Lisa's estate. Scientology attorneys have filed bar complaints against both him and Lirot, lawsuits against Lisa's family, and motions to remove judges and move the case to other venues. When asked how going up against Scientology compares to normal litigation, [First Amendment attorney Luke] Lirot replied, "It's like comparing LSD to orange juice." ... The wrongful death case went through four judges in seven years.

=== 1980–2002 — Larry Wollersheim litigation ===
In the case of Wollersheim vs. Church of Scientology (1980), former member Larry Wollersheim sued the organization for mental distress, and was awarded $30 million in damages. On appeal, the award was reduced to $2.5 million. In 1996, Wollersheim was awarded an additional $130,506.71 in attorney's fees incurred while defending against a church lawsuit that was dismissed for violating a California law prohibiting strategic lawsuits against public participation. The Church vowed not to pay the award, and the case dragged through the courts for 22 years, including two separate appeals to the Supreme Court of the United States and two additional appeals to the Supreme Court of California. In early 2002, the case was finally settled, with the Church of Scientology paying Larry Wollersheim $8,674,643.

=== 1984–2004 — Gerry Armstrong litigation ===
In 1984, the Church began a legal battle with Gerry Armstrong that spanned two decades. The Church sued Armstrong for providing confidential documents about L. Ron Hubbard to his own attorney. The court found that Armstrong's actions were justifiable and affirmed this conclusion in Church of Scientology v. Gerald Armstrong. Armstrong settled his counter-claims with the Church in December 1986 for $800,000 in exchange for his agreement to keep confidential his experience with the Church. The Church sued Armstrong for $10.5 million in 1995 and 2002 for allegedly violating the confidentiality agreement in 131 instances. A California appellate court awarded the Church $321,923 in damages and $334,671.75 in attorneys fees in 1995, and $500,000 in damages in 2004. The court noted that "Armstrong makes no claim that he has complied, or will ever comply, with the injunction" and that Armstrong claims to now reside in Canada.

=== 2009–2018 — DeCrescenzo forced-abortion and child-labor suit ===
In DeCrescenzo v. Church of Scientology International, Laura DeCrescenzo sued the organization in 2009 for forcing her to illegally work 14 hour days at age 12 and coercing her to get an abortion at age 17. In 2018, Scientology settled with DeCrescenzo three weeks before the case went to trial.

=== 2013–2017 — Garcia fraud and arbitration dispute ===
Garcia Saz et al. v. Church of Scientology Religious Trust et al. In 2013, former Scientology members Luis and Rocio Garcia sued the Church, alleging fraudulent tactics. U.S. District Judge James D. Whittemore granted the Church's motion to compel the couple into internal "religious arbitration" per the contracts the Garcias had previously signed with the Church. The Church had not established any rules for how to conduct arbitrations and had never before held such an arbitration. For 2½ years the Church objected to each arbiter the Garcias suggested. Eventually the judge selected three Scientologists at random from a list of 500 provided by the Church and the two-day arbitration was held in 2017. The Garcias were not allowed to have an attorney present, bring witnesses, or record the proceedings, and a Church official removed all but 70 pages of the 900 pages of evidence the Garcias submitted. Their attorney called the arbitration "a sham". According to an article in the Tampa Bay Times, "The panel ultimately refunded the Garcias $18,495 for unused deposits on religious services but did not acknowledge the claims of fraud, misrepresentation or breach of contract." An appeal by Garcia was unsuccessful.

=== Ongoing suits ===
As of the end of 2024, the following cases were still open.

==== 2019 — Bixler et al. v. Scientology and Danny Masterson ====
Chrissie Bixler et al. v. Scientology and Danny Masterson. In 2019, plaintiffs Chrissie Carnell Bixler, Cedric Bixler-Zavala, Bobette Riales, and Jane Does #1 and #2 filed a civil suit against actor Danny Masterson for rape, and against the Church of Scientology for systematically stalking them after they went to the police. After a setback when a judge ruled they would have to "take their claims before an ecclesiastical tribunal composed of three Scientologists deemed to be in good standing with the church," the California Court of Appeal ruled that the plaintiffs could keep arguing their case in court. Meanwhile, Masterson was criminally charged with forcible rape, the parties agreed that discovery in the civil suit should be delayed pending the outcome of the criminal case, and in 2023 Masterson was convicted on two charges of rape. Even though the Church of Scientology wasn't a party in the criminal trial, it came to light that the Church had been actively interfering with the criminal case, including harassing the prosecutor as well as the LAPD witnesses. In December 2023, the plaintiffs filed a second amended complaint, adding a sixth complainant, Tricia Vessey, and adding civil RICO claims against the Church of Scientology. Scientology filed anti-SLAPP motions, which the judge denied. Scientology appealed and was granted until March 14, 2025 to file their brief.

==== 2019 — Valerie Haney v. Scientology ====
Valerie Haney v. Scientology. After 22 years in Scientology's Sea Org, Valerie Haney escaped from Gold Base in 2016 by secretly climbing into the trunk of a visitor's car to get out of the compound unnoticed. In 2019, Haney sued Scientology for holding her against her will, libeling her online, and stalking her using private investigators after she left the Church. In 2020, a judge ordered her to "religious arbitration" per contracts she had earlier signed. Unable to come to any agreements about arbiters, in 2023 the judge ordered the parties to get it done. Scientology picked three arbiters, but would not tell Haney or the court their names. The judge denied plaintiff's motion to allow an attorney, a court reporter, or even a friend to attend with Haney. Per Haney, "The court is OK with me having to go back to the place where I literally had to escape in the trunk of a car to get out? ... It's the worst thing you could probably have a victim do. ... Someone who has been abused her entire life, to go back into the abusive environment with the abusers. It's appalling. And absolutely disgusting. It's so crazy." A court date of February 20, 2025 was set to update the court about the arbitration.

==== 2022 — Baxter, Baxter, and Paris v. Scientology ====
Baxter, Baxter, and Paris v. Scientology. In 2022, Gawain Baxter, his wife Laura Baxter, and Valeska Paris filed suit against the Church of Scientology and David Miscavige alleging six counts of forced labor and peonage in violation of the Victims of Trafficking and Violence Protection Act of 2000. Since childhood, all three had been held captive for years on the Scientology ship Freewinds, with their passports and identification documents confiscated. Gawain Baxter alleged he was held captive on the ship for 14 more years after he tried to leave the organization at age 15. Valeska Paris alleged she was sexually assaulted in the Sea Org since childhood, but was punished whenever she tried to report the incidents. She spent 11 years working on the ship, and was then sent to Scientology's work camp in Australia. Laura Baxter alleged cruel abuse, forced confessions and manual labor. She deliberately got pregnant and refused an abortion in order to be kicked out of the Sea Org. Deliberately evading service, in 2023 after plaintiff's lawyers attempted 27 times at multiple sites in California and Florida to serve Miscavige, a judge finally ruled Miscavige as served. On April 3, six weeks after the magistrate ruled Miscavige as served, US District Judge Tom Barber ruled in favor of the first amendment, saying in his order that the plaintiffs must seek relief from Church arbitration and not the courts. Ruling on the case would require the courts to interpret religious doctrine, which is against the first amendment, said Barber.

==== 2022 — Jane Doe 1 v. Scientology, Miscavige, and Potter ====
Jane Doe 1 v. Scientology, David Miscavige, and Gavin Potter. In December 2022, a Jane Doe filed suit against Scientology leader David Miscavige, recruiter Gavin Potter and three church entities claiming that as a minor the Church enabled one of their recruiters to sexually assault her. After she reported the incident, not only did Scientology fail to report the allegations to police but she was given the ultimatum of going to Scientology's prison work camp, the RPF, for five years or marry her abuser. The case alleges Scientology even transported her out of state to Nevada where an underage marriage was possible, and that Scientology officials "knew ... of Gavin Potter's unlawful sexual conduct, that he was an unfit agent, and still placed him in a position to solicit young girls into an environment in which sexual assault and battery were commonplace."

Accusing David Miscavige of "service dodging", Judge Broadbelt ruled in February 2024 that the plaintiff must exhaust all options before being allowed to serve Miscavige by publication. On April 15, 2024, Judge Broadbelt posted a tentative ruling in favor of the plaintiff when he found Scientology's religious arbitration contract "unconscionable". The following morning, Miscavige—effectively accepting service in the case for the first time—sent his lawyer to the courthouse to file a peremptory challenge to disqualify the judge, causing Broadbelt to step aside. Scientology requested to depose Jane Doe 1 and a lawyer involved in a prior lawsuit connected to her; a hearing was set for January 9, 2025.

==== 2023 — Leah Remini v. Scientology ====
Leah Remini v. Scientology. In 2023, Leah Remini filed a lawsuit against the Church of Scientology and David Miscavige claiming defamation, harassment, stalking and tortious interference with a contractual relationship (Remini's business relationships), seeking compensatory and punitive damages for economic and psychological harm. Remini claimed she had been stalked, surveilled, harassed, threatened, intimidated, and subjected to intentionally malicious and fraudulent rumors. Remini's family and friends had also been subjected to the harassment, and in 2015 Remini hired bodyguards fearing for her physical safety. "For 17 years, Scientology and David Miscavige have subjected me to what I believe to be psychological torture, defamation, surveillance, harassment, and intimidation, significantly impacting my life and career", Remini said.

In January 2024, the lawsuit survived an anti-SLAPP motion by the Church of Scientology, though the judge removed some of the defamation claims which occurred prior to the one-year statute of limitations, kept some, where the defendants published false claims "with at least a reckless disregard of the facts", and rejected Scientology's argument that their early surveillance of Remini was a "pre-litigation stance". Both parties appealed the ruling. Accused of "service dodging", in February 2024 judge Hammock told David Miscavige's lawyer, "He should just appear, and defend himself."

== Civil lawsuits filed by Scientology ==
=== Policy ===
Critics state that the ultimate aim of Scientology lawsuits is to destroy church opponents by forcing them into bankruptcy or submission, using its resources to pursue frivolous lawsuits at considerable cost to defendants. In doing so, they draw particular attention to certain controversial statements made by Scientology founder, L. Ron Hubbard, in the 1950s and 1960s.

In 1994, Scientology attorney Helena Kobrin was fined $17,775 for filing a frivolous lawsuit. U.S. District Court Judge Leonie Brinkema cited a frequently quoted statement of L. Ron Hubbard on the subject in the case of Religious Technology Center vs. The Washington Post, on November 28, 1995:

The purpose of the suit is to harass and discourage rather than win. The law can be used very easily to harass, and enough harassment on somebody who is simply on the thin edge anyway, well knowing that he is not authorized, will generally be sufficient to cause professional decease. If possible, of course, ruin him utterly.

— L. Ron Hubbard, The Scientologist, a Manual on the Dissemination of Material, 1955

Critics also allege that the Church uses litigation as a cover for intimidation tactics, such as investigating the criminal records (or lack thereof) of opponents and subjecting them to surveillance and invasive inquiries, both to discourage further criticism and to ensure the opponent's unwillingness to fight the lawsuit. A policy letter by L. Ron Hubbard, distributed in early 1966, says:

This is correct procedure:

1. Spot who is attacking us.
2. Start investigating them promptly for FELONIES or worse using own professionals, not outside agencies.
3. Double curve our reply by saying we welcome an investigation of them.
4. Start feeding lurid, blood sex crime actual evidence on the attackers to the press.

Don't ever tamely submit to an investigation of us. Make it rough, rough on attackers all the way.

Critics of Scientology cite this passage, among others (such as the widely documented fair game doctrine), to support their contentions that the Church uses smear tactics to augment the effectiveness of legal threats.

=== Copyright enforcement ===
Hubbard v Vosper (1972) was a copyright case involving the book The Mind Benders authored by Cyril Vosper that contained numerous excerpts from Scientology writings. Using the fair dealing defence, Vosper won his case on appeal.

In 1996, Zenon Panoussis of Sweden published some of the confidential NOTs documents online and the Church of Scientology sued Panoussis for copyright infringement. In his defense, Panoussis used a provision of the Constitution of Sweden that guarantees access to public documents. Panoussis turned over a copy of the NOTs documents to the office of the Swedish Parliament and, by law, copies of all documents (with few exceptions) received by authorities are available for anyone from the public to see, at any time he or she wishes. This, known as the Principle of Public Access (Offentlighetsprincipen), is considered a basic civil right in Sweden. The case, however, was decided against Panoussis and he was ordered to pay $164,000 for infringing copyright. The results of the case sparked a legal firestorm in Sweden that debated the necessity of re-writing part of the Constitution.

In 1997, the Church of Scientology engaged Sonny Bono, then a member of the United States House of Representatives who had studied Scientology in the 1970s and 1980s, to pressure US Trade Representative Charlene Barshefsky to pressure Sweden to change their law permitting free access to any published work regardless of copyright. Along with pressure from Congress, the State Department and the Commerce Department, Sweden agreed to pass tougher copyright protection laws.

=== Defamation and anti-critic lawsuits ===
==== Paulette Cooper ====
After writing an article and publishing a book about the Church of Scientology in 1971, journalist Paulette Cooper was sued 19 times as part of the Church's Operation Freakout, and almost successfully framed in 1976 for crimes. The plan was foiled when in 1977 the FBI raided several Scientology offices, seizing over 48,000 documents, which detailed the operation against Cooper.

==== Time magazine ====
In May 1991, Time magazine published a cover story on Scientology entitled "The Thriving Cult of Greed and Power". The Church responded by suing Time and journalist Richard Behar for $400 million; a five-year legal battle ensued in which Time spent approximately $7 million defending itself in court. The case was eventually dismissed in the magazine's favor. Scientology unsuccessfully sued Reader's Digest in Switzerland, France, Italy, the Netherlands, and Germany to stop distribution of a condensed version of the Time story.

==== Hill & Knowlton and Eli Lilly ====
The PR firm Hill & Knowlton (H&K) was hired by the Church of Scientology in 1987. Right after the devastating Time magazine article The Thriving Cult of Greed and Power was published, H&K dropped them as a client. In 1992, the Church of Scientology sued H&K and Eli Lilly for $40 million claiming H&K had illegally terminated the contract because of pressure exerted upon their parent company WPP Group by Eli Lilly, which Scientology had been attacking through its branch group, Citizens Commission on Human Rights. In 1994, after 57,000 pages of discovery and 75 depositions, the parties settled out of court for an undisclosed amount or conditions.

==== Cult Awareness Network ====
The Cult Awareness Network (CAN) was driven into bankruptcy in 1996 in part by a number of Scientology-related lawsuits. As the TV news program 60 Minutes reported in 1997, Scientologists filed over fifty lawsuits against the non-profit organization, which spent over $2 million on its legal defense. After one court handed down a judgment of $1 million against CAN, the organization filed for bankruptcy and auctioned off its assets, which were purchased for $20,000 by a lawyer affiliated with Scientology.

=== Scientology versus the Internet ===
Beginning in the mid-1990s, Scientology launched a coordinated legal campaign to prevent the online distribution of its confidential materials. Early lawsuits relied on copyright claims, but when courts required the Church to authenticate the leaked documents, Scientology increasingly shifted to trade-secret arguments, which allowed them to assert confidentiality without publicly producing the disputed texts. The campaign included lawsuits against individuals, ISPs, and online archives, as well as attempts to expand liability for hyperlinks and online discussion.

Scientology filed lawsuits against a number of Internet users, The Washington Post newspaper, over fifteen various Internet service providers in The Netherlands, and others concerned in the matter of Karin Spaink, a supporter of Arnie Lerma and other Internet activists who posted on her Web page excerpts from Scientology's confidential works. This legal case included claims by Scientology that hyperlinks to alleged copyright infringements were also illegal. Spaink's case was taken all the way to the Supreme Court of the Netherlands; however, the Court rejected Scientology's claims in their entirety, including the claims regarding hyperlinks.

==== Netcom ====
Religious Technology Center v. Netcom On-Line Communication Services, Inc. (N.D. Cal. 1995), is a U.S. district court case about whether the operator of a computer bulletin board service (BBS) and Internet access provider that allows that BBS to reach the Internet should be liable for copyright infringement committed by a subscriber of the BBS.

==== FACTNet ====
In 1998, Scientology sued FACTNet for claimed copyright violations. When federal judge John Kane denied Scientology's request for summary judgment because FACTNet challenged Scientology's ownership of the copyrights of the documents, a settlement was reached in 1999. The terms were that if FACTNet is ever found guilty of violations of Church copyrights, they are permanently enjoined to pay the Church $1 million.

=== Religious Technology Center v. Gerbode ===
In Religious Technology Center v. Gerbode, 1994 WL 228607 (C.D. Cal. 1994) (against Frank A. Gerbode, inventor of Traumatic Incident Reduction), a Rule 11 sanction of $8,887.50 was imposed against Helena Kobrin, an attorney for the Church, for bringing baseless and frivolous claims.

== Regulatory and administrative actions ==
=== 1965 — Australia: Anderson Report ===
In 1965, the Australian state of Victoria published the Anderson Report, the first major government inquiry into Scientology. Conducted by Kevin Victor Anderson QC, the inquiry concluded that Scientology was "a delusional belief system" and described its practices as medically, morally, and socially harmful. The report led Victoria to enact the Psychological Practices Act of 1965, which restricted Scientology's activities and inspired similar legislation in other Australian states. Although no convictions were obtained and the laws were later repealed, the inquiry marked the first significant regulatory action taken against Scientology and shaped subsequent government responses in Australia and internationally.

=== 1969 — New Zealand: Dumbleton–Powles Report ===
In 1969, the New Zealand government published the Dumbleton–Powles Report, the findings of a Commission of Inquiry chaired by E. V. Dumbleton and Sir Guy Powles. Prompted by a 1968 petition calling for an investigation into Scientology's influence on families and young people, the commission held hearings to examine allegations of coercive or harmful practices. After reviewing testimony from former members, families, and experts, the Commission concluded that “the activities, methods, and practices of Scientology did result in persons being subjected to improper or unreasonable pressures.” The Commission stopped short of recommending legislative action, and accepted assurances from Scientology that it would modify its practices.

=== 2006 — France: Parliamentary report ===
In 2006, a French parliament report designated the Church of Scientology as a dangerous sect.

== Litigation for religious recognition ==
One goal of the Church of Scientology is to be recognized as a religion or a tax-free charity, which has met resistance from several governments, with Scientology taking to the courts with varying results. For example, Scientology's path to legal recognition as a religion in New Zealand took 48 years and several lawsuits. In 1999, the United Kingdom rejected an application for charity status and the attendant tax benefits. Scientology applied for Canadian tax-exempt status in 1998, was rejected in 1999, and is not registered as a charity as of 2009. In Austria, the organization withdrew its application to register as a "religious confessional community". Some governments have labeled the Church as a cult. German and Belgian government entities have accused Scientology of violating the human rights of its members and therefore called it a "totalitarian cult" and a "commercial enterprise". In 1995, a parliamentary report in France classified it as a "dangerous cult". In Russia, the government had refused to consider Scientology for registration as a religious organization, which became the subject of proceedings before the European Court of Human Rights in the case of Church of Scientology Moscow v. Russia.

=== 1967–1993 — United States: IRS tax-exemption dispute ===
From the time its tax exemption was removed by the IRS in 1967 to the reinstatement of the tax exemption in 1993, Scientologists filed approximately 2,500 lawsuits against the IRS. Over fifty lawsuits were still active against the IRS in 1993, although these were settled after the Church negotiated a tax exemption with the government.

=== 1995–2000 — Switzerland: Religious status litigation ===
In several cases between 1995 and 2000, the Federal Supreme Court of Switzerland consistently ruled that the Church of Scientology was a primarily commercial, rather than religious, organization, and in 2003 upheld a decision to force closure of a Scientology-affiliated school.

=== 2007 — Russia: Church of Scientology Moscow v. Russia (ECHR) ===
Church of Scientology Moscow v. Russia was decided on April 5, 2007 when the Church of Scientology of Moscow won a judgment against the Russian government establishing its right to recognition as a religious organization. The European Court of Human Rights held that the government's refusal of registration "had no lawful basis ... the Moscow authorities did not act in good faith and neglected their duty of neutrality and impartiality vis-à-vis the applicant's religious community."

== See also ==
- Scientology and the Internet
- Scientology in Germany
- Fair game (Scientology)
