= Scientology in Canada =

The Scientology movement has been present in Canada since at least the 1960s. According to the most recent available census data, there were 1,380 individuals in Canada identifying as Scientologists in 2021, down from 1,745 in 2011. Scientology has encountered difficulties in obtaining status as a tax exempt organization, as has happened in other countries.

== Locations ==
Toronto

The Toronto organization's 8-storey building at 696 Yonge Street was vacated in 2012 and boarded up in 2013 for a renovation to an "Ideal Org". The plans would "remove all interior walls on all floors, remove all exterior walls ... and construct new exterior and interior alterations to all floors." In 2015, Scientology owed over $100,000 in property taxes and penalties. As of 2022, the building was still boarded up and vacant.

Montreal

In 2007, the Montreal organization purchased the historic La Patrie building in downtown Montreal's Latin Quarter with plans to renovate it as an Ideal Org, but the building remained vacant. In 2015, the organization owed $117,000 in taxes, fines and interest. They paid off enough of that bill to avoid a sale of the building, but in 2016 faced another substantial tax bill and risked having the building auctioned off.

Cambridge

In 2013, a new Ideal Org was opened in Cambridge, Ontario at 1305 Bishop St. N.

Guelph

In 2017, Scientology rented the building at 40 Baker Street for administrative offices. A month later, there were demonstrators out front protesting the presence of Scientology in Guelph.

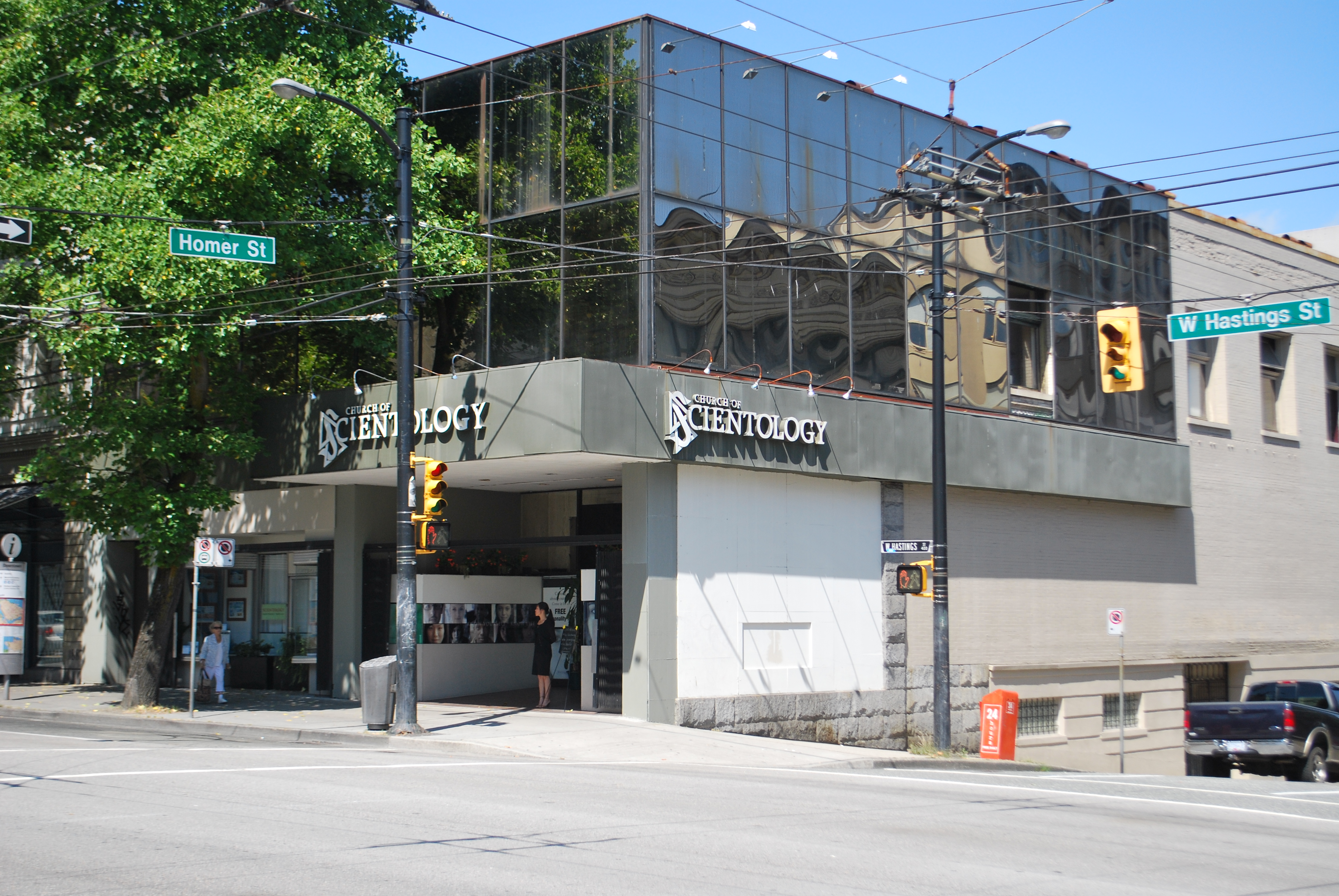
Vancouver 2012

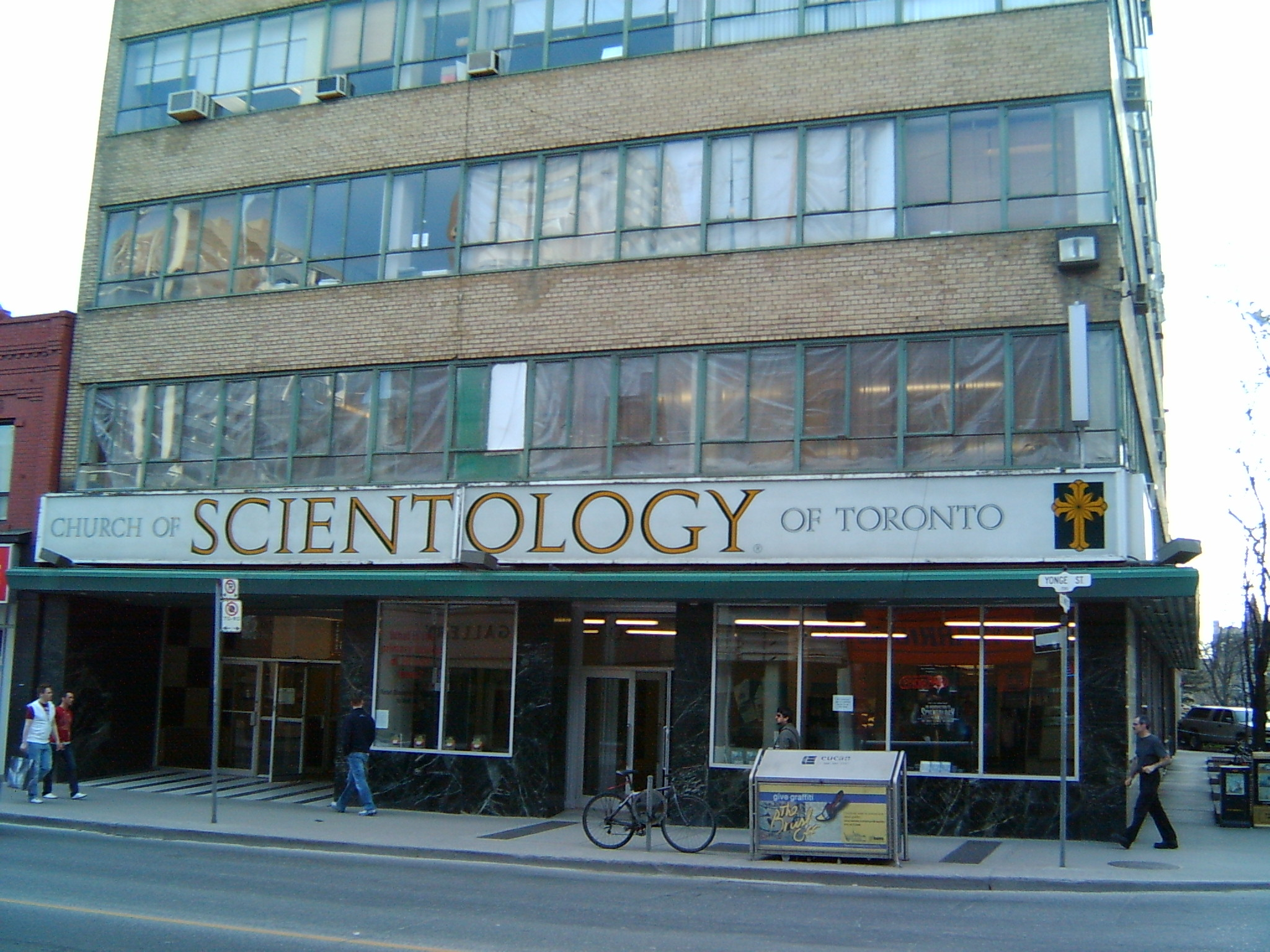
Toronto 2007

Montréal 2026

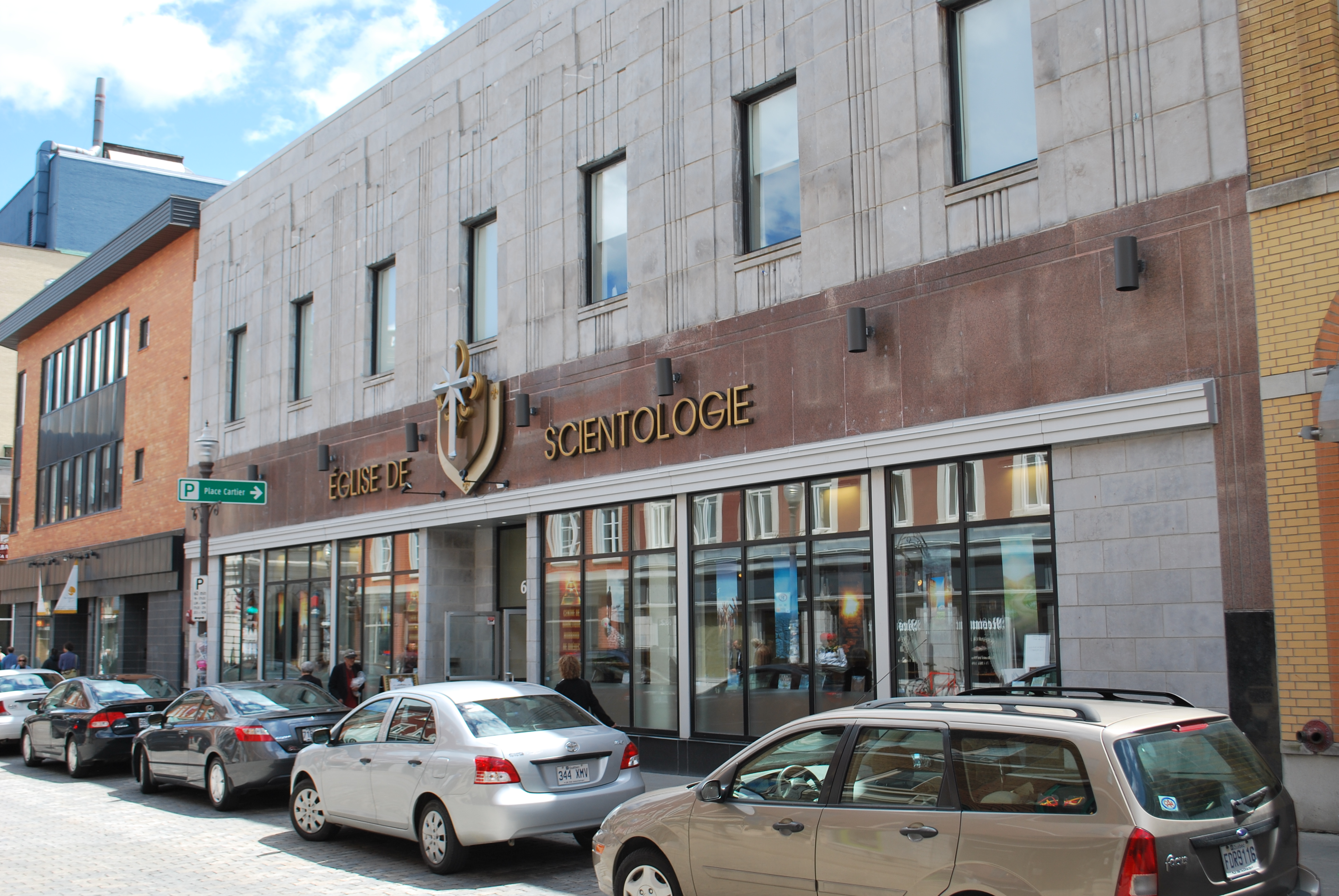
Québec 2010

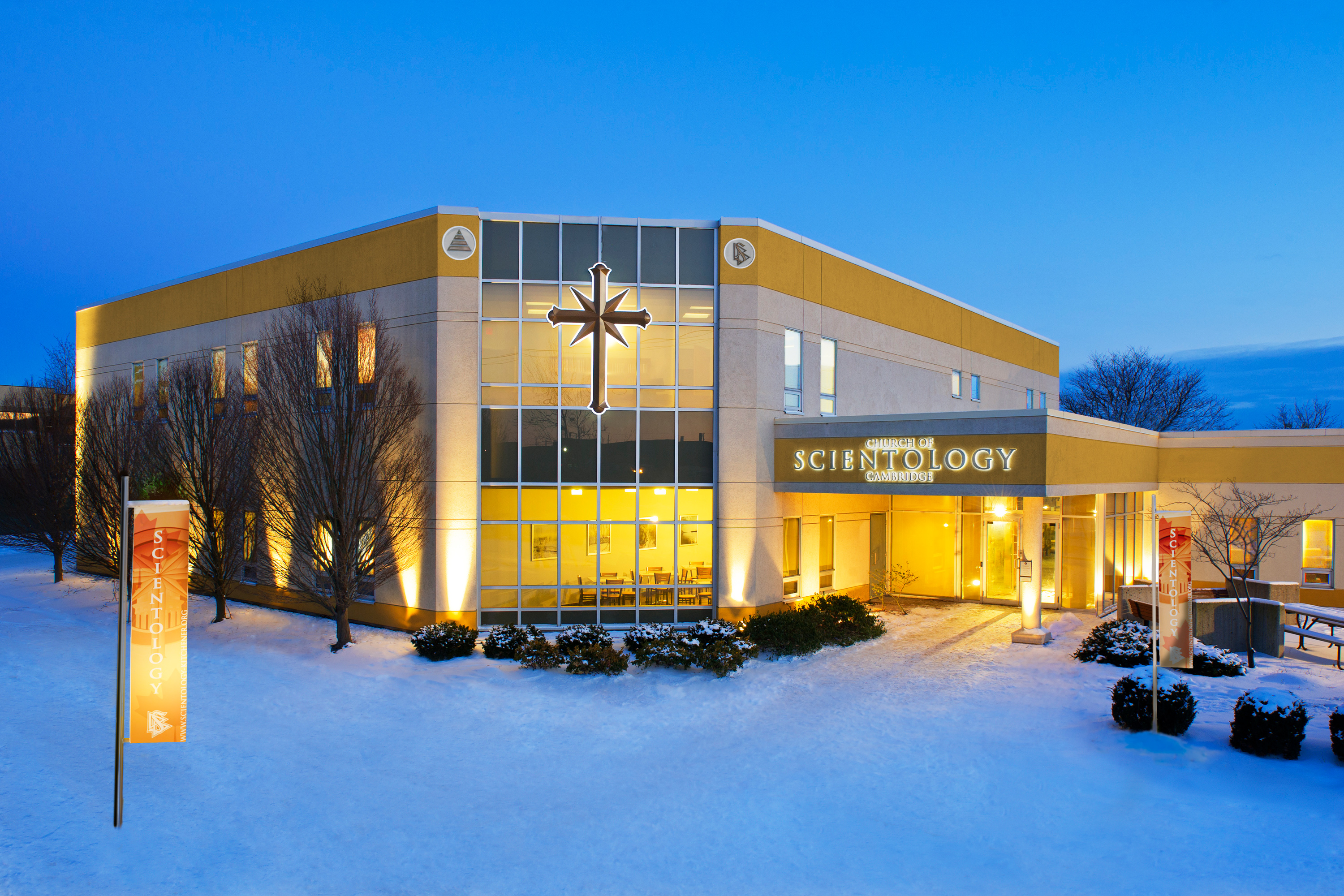
Cambridge 2013

== Legal status as a religion ==
Religious scholars David G. Bromley and Douglas Cowan, writing in a 2006 publication, state that Scientology has so far failed to gain official recognition as a religion in Canada.

The Church has failed to win status as a federally registered charity for tax purposes. A November 2007 article in The Varsity, a University of Toronto student newspaper, stated that the Church of Scientology is classified as a religious non-profit organization in Canada whose ministers can perform marriages, and that Scientologist public servants are allowed to take time off work for Scientologist holidays. However, since marriage is governed in Canada by provincial law, it is unclear whether Scientology is actually accredited in any Canadian province to perform legal marriages.

== The Lee Report ==
In 1966, the provincially appointed Committee on the Healing Arts began investigating medicine and healing in Ontario. The study involved the examination of hypnosis and groups that use it, as well as several sectarian groups including Scientology. The resulting report in 1970, by John A. Lee, entitled Sectarian Healers and Hypnotherapy was dubbed The Lee Report.

Lee's work included an examination of groups which purported to heal mainly through the use of suggestion. Though Scientologists disclaim any interest in healing physical or mental disorders, they also claim that 70% of human illness is psychosomatic and can be cured by Scientology.

From 1967 through 1968, the committee was unable to get cooperation from the Church of Scientology. The Church refused to return the committee's questionnaire, while complaining of the nature of Lee's investigation. They simply responded that "Scientology bore no relation to the healing arts" and that their religious technology should not be subject to inspection.

The committee issued subpoenas to which the Church partially complied. The Church then let loose "a volley of highly offensive press releases" in 1968 attacking members of the committee, accusing them of crimes, impugning their motives, and accusing the committee of conducting an Inquisition. In the end, the committee concluded that scientologists do purport to heal and that "Scientology should not be excluded from the proscriptions of the practice of medicine under the Medical Act on the grounds of being a religion."

== Operation Snow White ==
"Operation Snow White" was the Church of Scientology's name for a project during the 1970s to purge unfavourable records, mainly in the US, about Scientology and its founder L. Ron Hubbard.

As a result of documents stolen from public and private agencies in Canada and information on other covert activities found as evidence collected in the Operation Snow White case, investigations into the Church of Scientology in Ontario were started. This eventually resulted in a large police raid of the Church of Scientology in Toronto, 3 March to 4 March 1983. The R. v. Church of Scientology of Toronto case began 23 April 1991, resulting in seven members being convicted of operations against organizations including the Ontario Provincial Police, the Ontario Ministry of the Attorney General and the Royal Canadian Mounted Police (RCMP), and two convictions of criminal Breach of the Public Trust against the church itself, for infiltration of the offices of the Ontario Provincial Police and the Ontario Ministry of the Attorney General. The Church of Scientology was ordered to pay a $250,000 fine.

== Hill v. Church of Scientology of Toronto ==
On 17 September 1984, Morris Manning, a lawyer working for the Church, and representatives of the Church of Scientology held a press conference on the courthouse steps in Toronto. Manning read from and commented upon allegations in a notice of motion by Scientology, intending to commence criminal contempt proceedings against a Crown Attorney, Casey Hill. The motion alleged that Hill had misled a judge and had breached orders sealing certain documents belonging to Scientology in R. v. Church of Scientology of Toronto.

At the contempt proceeding where the appellants were seeking a fine or imprisonment against the defendant, the allegations against Hill were found to be untrue and without foundation. Hill launched a lawsuit for libel damages against the appellants. Both Manning and the Church were found jointly liable for general damages of C$300,000 and Scientology alone was found liable for aggravated damages of C$500,000 and punitive damages of C$800,000. The judgement was affirmed in a 1994 decision by the Court of Appeal for Ontario, and again at the Supreme Court of Canada in 1995.

A professional lawyers' newspaper concluded that the C$1.6M amount was likely the third-to-fourth highest libel award affirmed by an appellate court in North America at the time. The initial jury found that Scientology was motivated by express malice and its actions were calculated to aggravate the injury to Hill. The court of appeal wrote that the libel was serious, was published in circumstances designed to cause the most serious damage to Hill's reputation and to ensure the widest circulation possible.

== See also ==
- Scientology status by country § Canada
- Scientology and law § Canada
- Religion in Canada
