= Hill v Church of Scientology of Toronto =

1995 Supreme Court of Canada libel decision

- Supreme Court of Canada

Hearing: February 20, 1995 Judgment: July 20, 1995
- Full case name: Morris Manning and the Church of Scientology of Toronto v. S. Casey Hill
- Citations: [1995] 2 S.C.R. 1130
- Docket No.: 24216
- Prior history: judgment for plaintiff (Court of Appeal for Ontario)
- Ruling: Appeal dismissed

Holding
- Charter does not protect individuals from tort of defamation. The tort must be in line with Charter values.

Court membership
- Chief Justice: Antonio Lamer; Puisne Justices: Gérard La Forest, Claire L'Heureux-Dubé, John Sopinka, Charles Gonthier, Peter Cory, Beverley McLachlin, Frank Iacobucci, John C. Major

Reasons given
- Majority: Cory J. (paras. 1-204), joined by La Forest, Gonthier, McLachlin, Iacobucci and Major JJ.
- Concurrence: L'Heureux-Dubé J. (paras. 205-210)
- Lamer C.J. and Sopinka J. took no part in the consideration or decision of the case.

Hill v Church of Scientology of Toronto February 20, 1995 – July 20, 1995. 2 S.C.R. 1130 was a libel case against the Church of Scientology, in which the Supreme Court of Canada interpreted Ontario's libel law in relation to the Canadian Charter of Rights and Freedoms.

After consideration, the Supreme Court of Canada determined that it would not follow the actual malice standard set forth in the famous United States Supreme Court case of New York Times Co. v. Sullivan, 376 U.S. 254 (1964).

== Overview ==
On 17 September 1984, Morris Manning, a lawyer working for the Church, and representatives of the Church of Scientology held a press conference on the courthouse steps in Toronto. Manning, wearing his barrister's gown, read from and commented upon allegations in a notice of motion by Scientology, intending to commence criminal contempt proceedings against a Crown counsel, Casey Hill. The motion alleged Hill had misled a judge and had breached orders sealing certain documents belonging to Scientology in R v Church of Scientology of Toronto.

At the contempt proceeding where the appellants were seeking a fine or imprisonment against the defendant, the allegations against Hill were found to be completely untrue and without foundation. Thus Hill launched a lawsuit for damages in libel against the appellants. Both appellants were found jointly liable for general damages of C$300,000 and Scientology alone was liable for aggravated damages of C$500,000 and punitive damages of C$800,000. The judgment was affirmed in a 1993 decision by the Court of Appeal for Ontario. The major issues raised in this appeal were: whether the common law of defamation was valid in light of the Canadian Charter of Rights and Freedoms and whether the jury's award of damages could stand.

According to the St. Petersburg Times, "Scientology paid Hill more than $4-million in 1996. The payment included interest and attorneys fees."

== The Charter, interpreting the common law and freedom of expression ==
=== Appellant's arguments ===
The Church of Scientology contended that the common law of defamation in Canada failed to evolve with Canadian society. Too much emphasis in the common law had been placed on the need to protect the reputation of plaintiffs at the expense of freedom of expression. This, they argued, was an unwarranted restriction imposed in a manner that cannot be justified in "a free and democratic society" that could survive a limitations clause challenge. The appellants added that if the element of government action was insufficient to attract Charter scrutiny, the principles of the common law ought to be interpreted, even in a purely private law action, in a manner consistent with the Charter. This, they argued, could be achieved only by the adoption of the "actual malice" standard of liability found in the Supreme Court of the United States in the case of New York Times Co. v. Sullivan.

Qualified privilege attaches to the occasion upon which the communication is made, and not to the communication itself. The legal effect of the defence of qualified privilege is to rebut the inference, which normally arises from the publication of defamatory words, that they were spoken with malice. Where the occasion is shown to be privileged, the bona fides of the defendant is presumed and the defendant is free to publish, with impunity, remarks which may be defamatory and untrue about the plaintiff. The privilege is not absolute, however, and can be defeated if the dominant motive for publishing the statement is actual or express malice. (Malice, in this context, is established by showing the defendant spoke dishonestly, or in knowing or reckless disregard for the truth.) Qualified privilege may also be defeated when the limits of the duty or interest have been exceeded. The fact that an occasion is privileged does not necessarily protect all that is said or written on that occasion. The information communicated must be reasonably appropriate in the context of the circumstances existing on the occasion when that information was given.

=== The Court's reasons ===
In two opinions (a majority opinion written by Cory J. per La Forest, Gonthier, Cory, McLachlin, Iacobucci and Major JJ., and a concurrence in result by L'Heureux-Dubé J.), the Court rejected those arguments while continuing to apply RWDSU v. Dolphin Delivery Ltd., [1986] 2 S.C.R. 573, that the Charter cannot rewrite the common law, though the common law should be interpreted according to general Charter principles. This did not mean the Court had to adopt the "actual malice" standard of libel from American jurisprudence.

In refusing to change Canadian law and bringing it more into line with "actual malice" standard applied in the US law (following the New York Times Co. v. Sullivan case) Cory J., writing for the majority, stated (at ¶ 138):

Freedom of speech, like any other freedom, is subject to the law and must be balanced against the essential need of the individuals to protect their reputation. The words of Diplock J. in Silkin v. Beaverbrook Newspapers Ltd., [1958] 1 W.L.R. 743, at pp. 745-46, are worth repeating:

"Freedom of speech, like the other fundamental freedoms, is freedom under the law, and over the years the law has maintained a balance between, on the one hand, the right of the individual… whether he is in public life or not, to his unsullied reputation if he deserves it, and on the other hand… the right of the public… to express their views honestly and fearlessly on matters of public interest, even though that involves strong criticism of the conduct of public people."

In L'Heureux-Dubé's concurring reasons, her analysis of the Charter issue applying to common law is succinctly stated: (at ¶ 206):

First, however, in order to dispel any possible confusion regarding the applicability of the Canadian Charter of Rights and Freedoms to the common law, I note that this issue can be easily summarized in the following two principles, both of which were first articulated by McIntyre J. in RWDSU v. Dolphin Delivery Ltd., [1986] 2 S.C.R. 573:

1. The Charter does not directly apply to the common law unless it is the basis of some governmental action.
2. Even though the Charter does not directly apply to the common law absent government action, the common law must nonetheless be developed in accordance with Charter values. (To the same effect, see R. v. Salituro, [1991] 3 S.C.R. 654, Dagenais v. Canadian Broadcasting Corp., [1994] 3 S.C.R. 835, and R. v. Park, [1995] 2 S.C.R. 836, per L'Heureux-Dubé J.)

In other words, the basic rule is that absent government action, the Charter applies only indirectly to the common law.

=== Factual background ===
As in all actions for libel, the factual background is extremely important and must be set out in some detail. At the time the defamatory statement were made, Casey Hill was employed as counsel with the Crown Law Office, Criminal Division of the Ministry of the Attorney General for the Province of Ontario. He had given advice to the Ontario Provincial Police ("OPP") regarding a warrant obtained on March 1, 1983, which authorized a searched warrant on March 3 and 4, 1983, approximately 250,000 documents, comprising over 2 million pages of material, were seized. These documents were stored in some 900 boxes at an OPP building in Toronto.

=== Result ===
The Supreme Court upholds the Ontario Court of Appeal decision and the underlying jury award of general, aggravated and punitive damages.

== Largest libel award in Canada ==
The jury award that was upheld in this appeal was the largest libel award in Canadian history. Barrister Manning and the Church of Scientology were found jointly liable for general damages of C$300,000. Scientology alone was liable for aggravated damages of C$500,000 and punitive damages of $800,000, making Scientology's total liability C$1,600,000. It was not until 2008 that this record was broken.

== See also ==
- R v Church of Scientology of Toronto
- Scientology and law
