= FACTNet =

Anti-cult organization

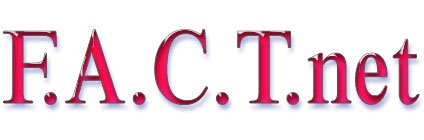
- Logo up through 2016
- Formation: 1993
- Type: 501(c)(3) non-profit
- Headquarters: Colorado, United States
- Official language: English
- Key people: Lawrence Wollersheim, Robert Penny
- Website: factnet.org

FACTnet, also known as Fight Against Coercive Tactics Network, co-founded by Robert Penny and Lawrence Wollersheim, was a Colorado-based anti-cult organization with the stated aim of educating and facilitating communication about destructive mind control. Coercive tactics, or coercive psychological systems, are defined on their website as "unethical mind control such as brainwashing, thought reform, destructive persuasion and coercive persuasion".

The organization was involved in litigation with the Church of Scientology involving the right to free speech and assertions of copyright.

== History ==
Co-founded by Robert Penny and Lawrence Wollersheim in 1993, FACTnet is an acronym that means Fight Against Coercive Tactics Network. The organization has been variously capitalized as F.A.C.T.Net, FACTNet, FACTnet, and Factnet. In 2008, FACTnet expanded its mission beyond Scientology topics to include abuses by other religions or cults, and in 2013 was expanded to include content related to sustainable living, climate change, Big Brother and Big Data, and human rights issues, as well as creating several offshoot websites for some of those. In 2014, FACTnet announced they would be closing their online forum for Scientology issues due to ongoing hacking issues and the emergence of several alternative websites able to take its place. At the end of 2016, the factnet.org website was disabled and the domain forwarded to another (factnetglobal.org), representing their move away from covering cult topics.

== Conflict with Church of Scientology ==
In 1995, FACTnet was featured in the news due to a lawsuit regarding the seizure of FACTnet servers and files by the Religious Technology Center (RTC), a sub-organization of the Church of Scientology created to oversee the protection of its trademarks and copyrights. In August 1995, RTC lawyers went to a Denver judge alleging copyright infringement and illegal use of Scientology documents by FACTnet. A raid of two directors' homes was conducted on August 21, 1995, by two U.S. marshals and six RTC representatives, with the actual search for incriminating documents conducted by the RTC alone. Witnesses of the searches testified that the marshals allowed the RTC representatives to go far beyond the scope of the order in their search for information. The marshals also failed to search the representatives before or after the search, making it possible for them to plant evidence or carry off discs and other documents containing critical information. FACTnet immediately accused the Church of Scientology of attempting to silence their voice by stealing and contaminating information vital to their continued disputes and lawsuits against the Church. The raids provoked debate both on the internet and in university settings, with university protesters in Denver, Colorado, holding signs that read: "Hands Off the Internet" and "Scientology Harasses Critics", while counter-protesters at the Boulder County Courthouse carried signs such as: "Only criminals spread lawlessness on the Internet."

FACTnet filed a lawsuit, and on September 14, 1995, a federal judge ruled the seizure illegal because it violated FACTnet's right to free speech, and ordered the RTC to return all computers and files that were seized. In his ruling in United States District Court, Judge John L. Kane stated: "The public interest is best served by the free exchange of ideas." Nevertheless, FACTnet stated that it had incurred irreparable damage, as the secrecy of its documents had been violated by the RTC. An attorney for the Electronic Frontier Foundation approved of the Judge's decision in the matter, stating: "They certainly do not have the right to seize everything and to fish around. There seems to be this thought that things that are contained on a computer aren't subject to the same protections. I think the law is catching up." Helena K. Kobrin, a Church of Scientology attorney with the firm Moxon & Kobrin, defended the seizures of the computers, saying after the judge's decision: "The decision yesterday was a very sad day for intellectual property owners and a very sad day for the Internet."

In a series of cases, the Church of Scientology, through its subsidiary Bridge Publications, sued FACTnet for claimed copyright violations. In 1998, Judge Kane denied the church's request for summary judgment after FACTnet challenged the church's claim of ownership of the copyrights of the documents. A settlement was later reached in 1999, whose terms were that if FACTnet is ever found guilty of violations of Church copyrights, they are permanently enjoined to pay the Church 1 million USD.

The 2000 film Battlefield Earth starring John Travolta stirred up controversy because it was based on a book by L. Ron Hubbard, the founder of the Church of Scientology, and Travolta was a well-known Scientologist. The Guardian reported on FACTnet's claims that the film was a proselytism piece for Scientology, noting: "FACTnet suggested that subliminal messages had been cunningly inserted by Scientologists to win over new converts to join the church." The filmmakers asserted that it had nothing to do with the Church of Scientology, but The New York Times reported on FACTnet's assertions that: "the film was secretly financed by Scientology, and that Scientology plans recruiting efforts to coincide with the movie's release." Sociology professor James T. Richardson did not agree with FACTnet's claims, stating: "I seriously doubt that someone is going to go out and join Scientology just because they see this movie."

In 2002, Lawrence Wollersheim won an $8.7 million judgement in his lawsuit Wollersheim v. Church of Scientology, and FACTnet posted a statement from him on the site, saying: "The cult that vowed it would never pay me one thin dime has now paid over 86 million thin dimes."

FACTnet spoke out in support of an episode of the TV show South Park, awarding their staff the "FACTnet Person(s) of the Year for 2005" for the satirical episode on Scientology, "Trapped in the Closet".

In 2006, FACTnet director Wollersheim was consulted for the 48 Hours documentary series story on the death of Scientologist Elli Perkins, "Scientology – A Question of Faith". Wollersheim was quoted in the piece, stating: "Scientology. They are the worst example of mind control in a religious setting that has ever existed." The program also noted that the Church of Scientology characterizes him as a "liar and a fraud", and asserts that most of its members live happy and fulfilled lives.

== Legal cases involving the internet ==
Legal cases involving the organization and the Religious Technology Center are cited in analysis of fair use law. The book Internet and Online Law noted that "reproduction in computer format of plaintiff's entire copyrighted texts for defendants' private use and study falls well within the fair use exception." The work Cyber Rights: Defending Free Speech in the Digital Age characterized FACTnet as part of the "publishers and posters" group, when analyzing Scientology-related legal cases The author also placed two former Scientologists, Dennis Erlich and Arnie Lerma, in this classification, while analyzing actions taken by the Church of Scientology, which the author calls a "famously litigious organization". Erlich and Lerma had criticized the church and posted material on the internet that the church asserted was protected by copyright.

== See also ==
- Anti-cult movement
- Copyright infringement
- Scientology and the legal system
- Scientology controversy
