= Section 32 of the Canadian Charter of Rights and Freedoms =

Application of Charter to federal and provincial governments

Section 32 of the Canadian Charter of Rights and Freedoms concerns the application and scope of the Charter. Only claims based on the type of law contemplated by this section can be brought before a court.

Section 32(1) describes the basis on which all rights can be enforced. Section 32(2) was added in order to delay the enforcement of section 15 until government was given time to amend their laws to conform to the section.

== Text ==
Under the heading "Application of Charter" the section states:

32. (1) This Charter applies

a) to the Parliament and government of Canada in respect of all matters within the authority of Parliament including all matters relating to the Yukon Territory and Northwest Territories; and
b) to the legislature and government of each province in respect of all matters within the authority of the legislature of each province.

(2) Notwithstanding subsection (1), section 15 shall not have effect until three years after this section comes into force.

The purpose of this section is to make it clear that the Charter only applies to governments, and not to private individuals, businesses or other organizations.

== Interpretation ==
The meaning of section 32(1) was first examined in RWDSU v. Dolphin Delivery Ltd. The courts found that the "authority" of government consisted of all laws created by the three branches of government (executive, legislative, and administrative), as well as any rules, or regulations created by "government actors". Common law only applied when it was the basis of some government action. Later, in R. v. Rahey (1987) the Supreme Court held that the Charter equally applies to courts as well.

== Government actors ==
The meaning of "government actors" was considered in the case of McKinney v. University of Guelph. The court, using what is called the "effective control test", examines the role of the government in the institution. A government actor consists of institutions for which the government has statutory authority to exercise substantial control over the day-to-day operations, policy-making, and as well provides substantial funding for the institutions.

The main question to ask is how much control the government has over the institution:

- Is there a law that directs how the institution will operate?
- Does the government appoint the majority of the institution's board of directors?
- Does the institution have any history or guarantees of independent action from government?

The greater the government control over the operation of the institution, the more likely it is to be a part of the government, although different Supreme Court decisions have required different amounts of control.

In practice this generally excluded organizations such as public universities and hospitals since the board of governors usually operated independently of government control. Colleges, however, are government actors because they lack the independence of a Board.

== Government policy ==
In cases where the "effective control test" fails there is still the possibility of the Charter applying where it can be shown that the organization provided services that were in furtherance of a specific government policy or program (Eldridge v. British Columbia). The reason for this expansion was to prevent the government from outsourcing services to private organizations in order to get around the "control test".

For example, in Eldridge v. British Columbia, the court found that though hospitals are not considered government actors, they are often subject to Charter scrutiny as many government policies are designed to be carried out by the hospitals.
