= Dumbleton–Powles Report =

The Dumbleton–Powles Report is a report on Scientology prepared for the government of New Zealand by E.V. Dumbleton and Sir Guy Richardson Powles, and published on 30 June 1969.

== Summary of report ==
Scientology existed in New Zealand at least as early as 1954.

In 1959, L. Ron Hubbard purchased and moved into Saint Hill Manor, a few miles from East Grinstead in Sussex, England. The practice of Scientology spread to a number of English-speaking countries, and Scientology soon attracted attention due to its controversial teachings, policies, and activities. Several official inquiries took place into Scientology in England, Australia, and elsewhere, and the respective governments published a number of reports in the late 1960s and early 1970s.

In 1968, a petition with 716 signatures called upon the Parliament of New Zealand to set up a board of inquiry into Scientology. The Commission of Inquiry into the Hubbard Scientology organisation in New Zealand issued public notice that it would hear evidence in Auckland and Wellington in March and April 1969. The commission aimed to "hear about and examine cases where it is said that Scientology has in New Zealand led to the estrangement of families, affected the control of persons under 21, or put unreasonable pressure upon former Scientologists who have left it, or other persons".

After hearing evidence, the Commission found against Scientology, concluding that "the activities, methods, and practices of Scientology did result in persons being subjected to improper or unreasonable pressures". However, on receiving assurances that Scientology would change its practices, the Commission recommended that - subject to those assurances - no immediate action be taken against Scientology.

== Similar reports ==
- The Foster Report (United Kingdom, 1971): Enquiry into the Practice and Effects of Scientology
- The Anderson Report (Victoria, Australia, 1965): Report of the Board of Inquiry into Scientology
- The Lee Report (Ontario, Canada, 1970): Sectarian Healers and Hypnotherapy

== See also ==
- Scientology in New Zealand
