= Scientology =

Belief system and practices developed by L. Ron Hubbard

- Scientology symbol
- Type: Belief system and organizational movement
- Founder: L. Ron Hubbard
- Description: A set of beliefs, practices, and institutions developed by Hubbard in the 1950s, centered on the concept of the thetan and a structured path of spiritual advancement
- Key components: Beliefs, auditing, ethics and justice, training routines, and advanced teachings
- Central texts: Bibliography of Scientology
- Organizational structure: Church of Scientology and affiliated groups
- Advanced teachings: Operating Thetan levels and OT III "Wall of Fire" materials
- Associated controversies: Financial demands, treatment of members and staff, legal disputes, opposition to psychiatry

Scientology is a set of beliefs and practices created by the American author L. Ron Hubbard. Hubbard initially presented his ideas in 1950 as a form of talk therapy called Dianetics. He later expanded and reframed those ideas as a religion, which he named Scientology. In 1953, he founded the Church of Scientology, which, by one 2014 estimate, had around 30,000 members.

A core Scientology belief is that traumatic events cause subconscious command-like recordings in the mind, which may have occurred in past lives, and which can only be relieved through an activity called "auditing". Auditing and training to audit are the two primary activities in a Scientology organization and are outlined in a structured progression chart called The Bridge to Total Freedom, with the two main achievement levels being the status of "Clear" (the goal of the original Dianetics) and "Operating Thetan" (Scientology's version of spiritual freedom). Fees are charged for auditing and training.

The upper‑level teachings of the Operating Thetan levels are considered confidential and are only revealed to Scientologists when they reach each level. The texts, which involve a past life cosmology narrative, have been leaked and publicized, despite the Church of Scientology litigating to keep them confidential.

The Church (Note: Use of "Church" or "the Church" is a common shortened form of "Church of Scientology"; see The Church (Scientology).) has been involved in numerous controversies, legal disputes, and even criminal convictions. It has been variously described as a religion, a cult, a business, and a scam. Scientology is classified differently around the world, with some countries granting it religious status, while others treat it as a non-religious belief system, a commercial enterprise, or a suspicious activity subject to government monitoring. Its practices and leadership have been the subject of sustained investigative reporting, academic study, government inquiries, and popular media portrayals.

== History ==
Scientology emerged in the early 1950s from L. Ron Hubbard's earlier system of Dianetics, which he promoted as a form of mental therapy. After the initial Dianetics organizations collapsed, Hubbard reframed his ideas as a religion and began establishing Scientology organizations in the United States and abroad. By the late 1950s and early 1960s, Scientology had developed its own doctrines, practices, and organizational structure, with Hubbard directing the movement from Saint Hill Manor in England.

During the 1960s and 1970s, Scientology expanded internationally but also faced increasing scrutiny from governments and regulatory agencies. In response, the organization created the Guardian's Office, an internal unit devoted to managing criticism and legal challenges, leading to several high-profile confrontations with authorities. These events shaped Scientology's reputation and contributed to its complex legal and social status in different countries.

In 1967, Hubbard established the Sea Org, a dedicated group of followers that became the hierarchical top tier of Scientology's administration. After Hubbard's death in 1986, leadership passed to David Miscavige, who consolidated control over the Church of Scientology's organizational network.

Under Miscavige, the organization has pursued legal recognition in numerous countries, and obtained tax-exempt status in the United States in 1993. Beginning in the early 2000s, the Church undertook a large scale real estate acquisition program. Public exposure on the internet increased criticism of Scientology, contributing to debate over the Church's practices and influence.

== Church of Scientology ==
The Church of Scientology is the organization that administers, governs, and promotes Scientology. It operates on a centralized hierarchical structure, running a global network of organizations and affiliated groups, and owns numerous properties including large campuses in California and Florida. The Church is managed by the Sea Org, an elite group of staff who sign billion-year contracts and hold senior positions within the network. Scholars describe the Church as highly bureaucratic with a heavy emphasis on statistics and performance targets.

The Church promotes Scientology through books and magazines, media productions, and advertising campaigns. It also operates Celebrity Centres, which cultivate celebrity involvement as a means of public outreach. The organization runs a variety of social programs—including drug rehabilitation, educational initiatives, business training, and disaster-response teams—that critics and some scholars describe as front groups used for recruitment and public relations.

The Church is widely known for its extensive litigation, aggressive responses to criticism, intelligence-gathering operations, and heavy disciplinary practices. These practices have been the subject of significant controversy and legal scrutiny.

== Scientologists ==
A Scientologist is a person who adheres to the beliefs and practices of Scientology, a movement founded by L. Ron Hubbard in the mid-20th century. The term is used for individuals who participate in Scientology services or training offered by the Church of Scientology, whether as public members or as part of the organization's staff. Estimates of the number of Scientologists vary widely, with the Church claiming worldwide membership in the millions, while national censuses and independent surveys indicate global totals in the tens of thousands.

The Free Zone, also known as Freezone or Independent Scientology, refers to a loose collection of individuals and groups who practice Scientology outside the authority of the Church of Scientology. These practitioners range from those who closely follow L. Ron Hubbard's early teachings to others who adapt or innovate upon them, often emphasizing a non-hierarchical and individualized approach to Scientology's methods. The Church of Scientology regards such activity as heretical and labels independent practitioners "squirrels", a term used within the Church for those who alter or use Scientology techniques without authorization.

== Hubbard as source ==
Scientology is based entirely on the thousands of writings and lectures of L. Ron Hubbard, which Scientologists regard as the authoritative source of its ideas and practices. Hubbard claimed that he developed his ideas through research and experimentation rather than through revelation from a supernatural source.

Hubbard developed thousands of neologisms, and Scientology's specialized vocabulary (Scientologese) is expected to be learned by members. The use of this terminology functions to separate Scientologists from non-Scientologists. The organization refers to its practices as "technology", or "tech", and emphasizes a strict "standard" application of the tech as infallible.

Scientologists view Hubbard as an extraordinary, Messiah-like figure, a thetan who remained on Earth to guide others toward spiritual liberation, and as the discoverer of the source of human suffering and the technology to overcome it. Scientologists often refer to Hubbard affectionately as "Ron". Church management describes Hubbard's physical death as "dropping his body" to continue research at higher spiritual levels, and the Church's hagiography of Hubbard contributes to the "prophetic authority" attributed to Hubbard.

Every Scientology Org maintains a "shrine room" arranged like an office set aside for Hubbard's return, and furnished to resemble those he used in life, including a bust and large photograph of him. The Church presents that Hubbard's work is complete and unalterable, and their archival project has buried copies of his writings on metal disks in underground vaults intended to preserve them against catastrophe.

== Beliefs ==
Scientology teaches that each person is an immortal spiritual being called a thetan, the true self that exists independently of the body, but has a body. According to Hubbard, thetans have lived through many past lives and continue existing after bodily death, after which they take on another newly-born human body. Negative experiences from earlier lifetimes are said to affect a person's present condition, and Scientology techniques are presented as methods for addressing those past traumas.

Scientology believes that the physical universe—called MEST, an acronym for matter, energy, space, and time—was originally created by thetans, who later became trapped within it and lost awareness of their spiritual nature. A central aim of Scientology practice is the recovery of the thetan's innate abilities, including exteriorization, the state when a thetan separates from the physical body and operates independently of it.

Scientology does not define or worship a supreme being, and focuses on the spiritual potential of the individual thetan rather than on the nature of a deity.

Scientology maintains a strong doctrinal hostility toward psychiatry and psychology. Hubbard taught that psychiatrists were responsible for severe harms in both ancient and modern history, and Scientology regards psychiatry as a corrupt and destructive profession. This stance is promoted institutionally through the Citizens Commission on Human Rights (CCHR), an anti-psychiatry organization established by the Church.

== Practices ==
=== Auditing ===
Auditing, also called processing, is a central practice in Scientology in which a trained auditor asks structured questions intended to help a participant identify and address past experiences and emotional difficulties. Most auditing uses an E-meter, a device the Church of Scientology describes as a spiritual tool for detecting areas of mental or spiritual trauma, though courts and scientists have found it to have no medical or scientific validity. Auditing is presented as the primary method for advancing up Scientology's Bridge to Total Freedom, a graded series of levels involving procedures and rundowns, using concepts such as the reactive mind, engrams, and past‑life incidents and implants. Scholars and critics have variously described auditing as a form of psychological conditioning, hypnosis, or pseudotherapy, and have raised concerns about its methods, the misuse of confidential session records, and its space‑opera cosmology. There have been legal, regulatory, and ethical controversies related to its unproven medical claims, misuse of private information, the use of child labor, and the death of some participants.

=== Ethics and justice ===
Scientology ethics and justice refer to a system of policies, procedures, and disciplinary mechanisms created by L. Ron Hubbard and used by the Church of Scientology to monitor and regulate the behavior of its members and staff. Scientology defines ethics as the actions an individual takes to regulate their own conduct, and justice as the corrective actions imposed by the group when a person fails to do so. The system includes a wide range of justice actions intended to correct deviations, including reports, files, interviews, hearings, courts, committees of evidence, orders, confessions, and security checks. The most severe action is declaring someone a suppressive person and expelling them from the Church, followed by the controversial practices of disconnection and fair game. Within the Sea Org, Scientology's elite management staff, additional punitive programs exist such as throwing people overboard, forced running, and heavy manual labor under confinement on the Rehabilitation Project Force. Scientology also uses a production-based model in which staff are evaluated on their weekly production (statistics). Scholars and critics have described the ethics and justice system as a mechanism of social control, noting its potential for coercion, arbitrary punishment, and human rights abuses.

=== Symbology ===
Scientology symbols include graphic emblems, diagrams, and visual devices used by the Church of Scientology and affiliated organizations. Many were created or approved by L. Ron Hubbard and are used to represent key concepts such as the ARC and KRC triangles, the eight dynamics, the Scientology cross, and the S-and-double-triangle emblem. These symbols appear throughout Scientology literature, training materials, uniforms, and buildings, and visually express elements of Scientology beliefs and practices.

Scientology celebrates seven calendar events including L. Ron Hubbard's birthday, Auditor's Day, and New Year's. There is a Sunday service which is primarily of interest for non-members and beginners. Weddings and funerals are also held.

== Advanced teachings ==
=== Operating Thetan levels ===
Operating Thetan (OT) is a concept in Scientology referring to a state of spiritual ability in which a person is said to be "cause over life, thought, matter, energy, space and time". After reaching the state of Clear, Scientologists may progress through a series of confidential OT levels that the Church of Scientology presents as advanced spiritual training. These levels, numbered OT I through OT VIII, are available only at designated service organizations and require substantial financial outlay.

The OT writings have been a major source of controversy due to their secrecy, high cost, and the Church's efforts to prevent their disclosure. Although the Church maintains that premature exposure to the material is dangerous, most OT documents from levels I-VIII have entered the public domain through court cases and internet leaks. Scholars of religion describe the OT system as a modern form of esoteric initiation, drawing on themes of past-life trauma, cosmic history, and the thetan's recovery of innate powers.

=== Space opera and the Wall of Fire ===
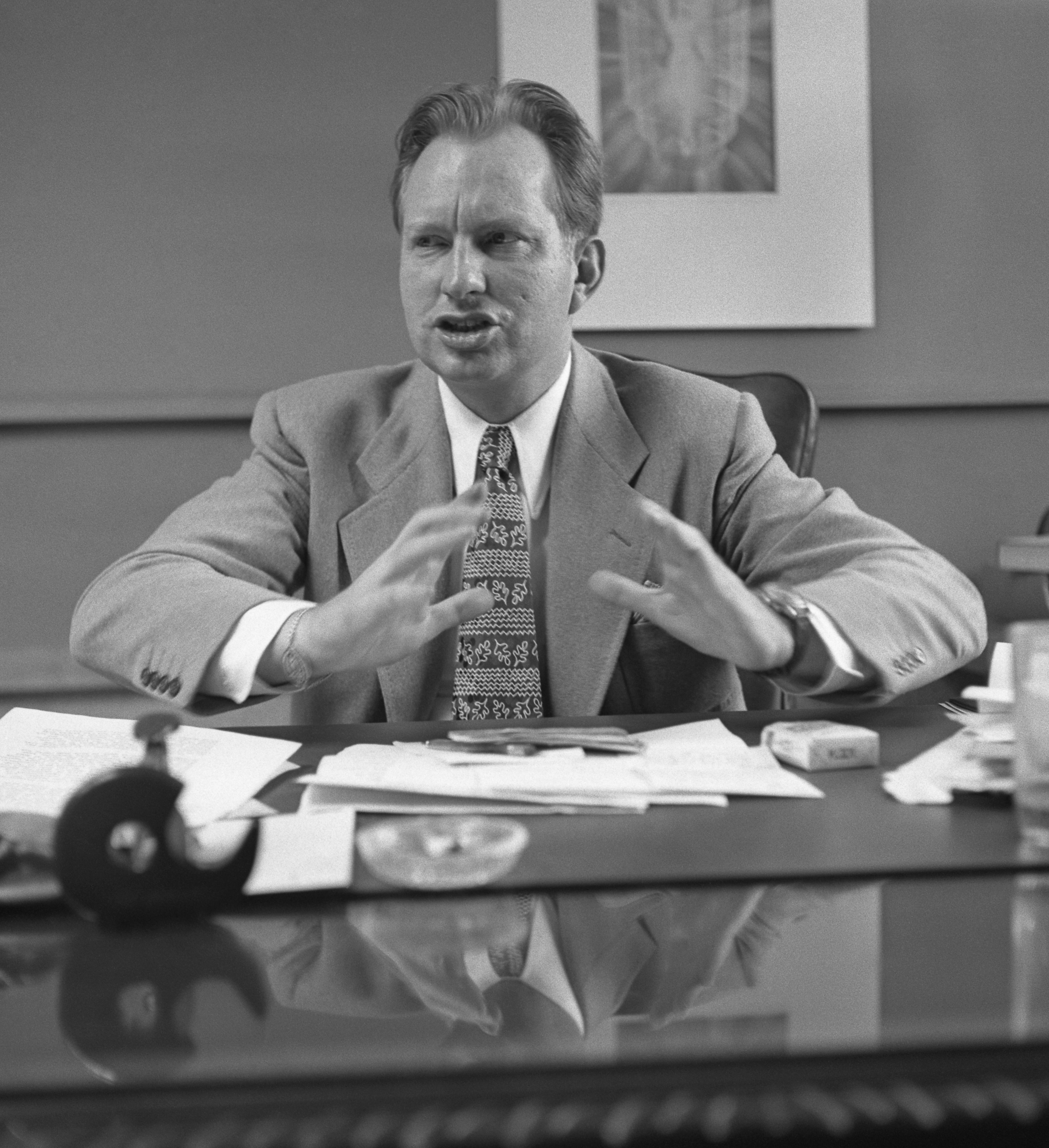
L. Ron Hubbard in 1950, around when he developed Scientology

Scientology founder L. Ron Hubbard routinely referred to "space opera" in his teachings, drawing from science-fiction and weaving it into his origins of human history. In his writings, wherein thetans (roughly comparable to the concept of a human soul) were reincarnated periodically over quadrillions of years, retaining memories of prior lives, to which Hubbard attributed complex narratives about life throughout the universe. The most controversial of these myths is the story of Xenu, to whom Hubbard attributed responsibility for many of the world's problems.

Xenu (/ˈziːnuː/ ZEE-noo), also called Xemu, is a figure in the Church of Scientology's confidential upper-level teachings, where he appears in material known as Operating Thetan level III (OT III). The Xenu narrative forms part of their space opera teachings about ancient extraterrestrial civilizations, catastrophic events in the distant past, and their continuing effects on the spiritual condition of humanity. These materials are treated as trade secrets and are normally disclosed only to Scientologists who have completed extensive preparatory coursework.

According to the OT III account, Xenu was an extraterrestrial ruler of a Galactic Confederacy who, tens of millions of years ago, transported billions of beings to Earth (then called Teegeeack), placed them around volcanoes, and killed them with hydrogen bombs. The disembodied spirits of the victims, called thetans, are said to have become attached to surviving bodies as "body thetans", contributing to spiritual and psychological difficulties in the present day. Scientology teaches that these entities can be identified and released through specialized procedures at the upper Operating Thetan levels.

== Controversies ==
Scientology has been involved in extensive public controversy since its founding. Major areas of controversy include its financial demands of members, abuses of members and staff, extralegal actions against critics and former members, and aggressive litigation. Scholarly and governmental assessments vary, but most state that Scientology has a long record of adversarial conduct. Religious scholars Urban and Lewis described the Church of Scientology as "the world's most controversial new religion", and "arguably the most persistently controversial of all contemporary new religious movements".

=== Financial demands ===
Scientology has been criticized for the high prices of its training courses and auditing services, which can cost tens or hundreds of thousands of dollars. Members complain that the Church uses high-pressure sales tactics to extract large donations for the purchase and renovation of Scientology properties, and to push Scientologists to pre-pay for future services. The Church maintains tight secrecy surrounding their advanced teachings, which are accessible only to higher-level members, and the mystery is used to further entice members to advance their progress more quickly. Members in the US are able to reduce their taxes by deducting as charitable gifts the amounts they pay for Scientology services.

=== Abuse of members ===
Members have been pressured to cut ties with family members through the practice known as disconnection. Confidential information disclosed during counseling sessions has been misused for internal disciplinary actions, and disclosed publicly to others. Scientology's ethics and justice systems are used to control members and keep them in the group; per Kent, the system's purpose is "to eliminate opponents, then eliminate people's interests in things other than Scientology".

=== Abuse of staff ===
Staff work extremely long hours for minimal pay, and are coercively pressured to remain on staff after expressing a wish to leave. Staff who leave are presented with a freeloader bill, retroactively charging for services they received as part of their employment, and easily running into the tens of thousands of dollars.

Staff who join the Sea Org—the elite inner group who sign billion-year commitments, work full time for the Church, and supervise management of the international network of hundreds of corporations—have reported routine sleep deprivation and harsh disciplinary programs, such as forced manual labor and years of confinement in the Rehabilitation Project Force. They routinely experience overwork, poor food, housing, and healthcare. Numerous Sea Org staff have reported that Scientology leader David Miscavige has mentally abused staff members and physically assaulted them.

Lawsuits by former Sea Org staff have accused Scientology of emotional injury (Wollersheim), human trafficking (Headley), forced labor (Baxter), forced abortions (DeCrescenzo), forced marriage (Doe), and unlawful imprisonment (Haney).

=== Criminal cases ===
The organization and officials have been involved in a number of criminal cases. The most prominent US case is United States v. Hubbard in which eleven senior staff, including Hubbard's wife, were convicted and jailed in 1979 for infiltrating US government agencies under the Church's infiltration campaign called Operation Snow White.

French courts have issued multiple convictions involving Scientology, including a fraud conviction of L. Ron Hubbard tried in absentia (1978), fraud and involuntary homicide in Lyon (1996), witness tampering in Marseilles (1996), fraud in Marseille (1999), and organized fraud in Paris (2009).

In 1988, seventy staff members in Spain, including then president of Church of Scientology International, were arrested and indicted on charges of fraud, extortion, forgery, tax evasion and violating public health laws; the case was fought for 14 years before being dismissed in 2002.

Scientology was convicted in Canada in 1992 for breach of public trust and infiltration of public offices, then lost a libel case for false utterances against the prosecutor to the tune of CAD $1.6 million (equivalent to $3,127,619 in 2025).

Switzerland courts convicted three Scientologists in 1998 on fraud and usury charges.

=== Treatment of critics ===
Critics, including journalists and former members, have reported that Scientology has used aggressive tactics against them, such as surveillance, litigation, and organized campaigns of retaliation called fair game, by which a person can be "tricked, cheated, lied to, sued, or destroyed".

One of the most documented examples was Operation Freakout, a covert campaign targeting journalist Paulette Cooper, which involved attempts to frame her for crimes and have her committed to a psychiatric institution, as well as filing at least 18 lawsuits against her.

In the 1990s, the Church of Scientology pursued a campaign of fair game to destroy the Cult Awareness Network (CAN), then the most prominent anti-cult organization in the United States. It flooded CAN with dozens of lawsuits, tried to have the head of CAN murdered, and sent its own lawyer to persuade a deprogramming victim with no connection to Scientology to sue CAN. The resulting jury award forced CAN into bankruptcy, and at auction Scientologists purchased the organization's assets—name, phone number, files, everything—and then reopened the organization under the control of Scientologists.

From the mid-1990s, Scientology tried to stem the tide of online criticism and posting of its copyrighted works and trade secrets. Termed "Scientology versus the Internet", the war against online critics continued until the late-2000s when the Anonymous online collective launched Project Chanology and Scientology's efforts were overwhelmed by the Streisand effect. During this era, Scientology filed DMCA cases to have material and search results removed from the internet, and filed lawsuits against internet providers (Netcom, XS4ALL) and online critics. They orchestrated raids on critics' homes, confiscating computers and files, including in the Lerma, Spaink, and FACTNet cases. Scientology was even banned from editing on Wikipedia.

=== Litigation ===
Scientology is known for frequent and highly adversarial legal action. The Church has filed hundreds of lawsuits over copyright infringement, defamation, and disclosure of trade secrets.

In the US, the Church engaged in a decades-long conflict with the Internal Revenue Service before obtaining tax-exempt status in 1993. The IRS had previously found that Scientology entities conferred substantial private benefit on Hubbard and his family, a central issue in the dispute over nonprofit status. Although Hubbard's death in 1986 ended the ongoing inurement, the conflict over past tax liabilities continued for years afterward until an unconventional and secret settlement was reached.

=== Government inquiries ===
Several governments have held formal inquiries into Scientology's practices. Reports examining Scientology's practices were published in Australia in 1965, New Zealand in 1969, Canada in 1970, and the UK in 1971.

Authorities in several countries have evaluated Scientology's religious or nonprofit claims, commercial practices, and internal discipline resulting in some instances of acceptance of Scientology as a religion, or designation as tax-exempt, while others treat it as a commercial enterprise, or subject it to special monitoring. France and Germany have issued critical reports and, in some cases, criminal convictions against Scientology organizations.

=== Opposition to psychiatry ===
Scientology has been opposed to psychiatry and psychology since the 1950s. L. Ron Hubbard portrayed those fields as harmful and illegitimate. The Church promotes auditing as an alternative practice, which medical experts and scholars describe as unlicensed psychological therapy, and which led to charges of "practicing medicine without a license" in the early 1950s and 1960s. Scientology's anti-psychiatry campaigns have discouraged people from seeking medical and mental health treatment.

This has contributed to several public controversies, including criminal charges against the Church due to the death of member Lisa McPherson during the Church's brutal isolation practices for psychotic breaks, called the Introspection Rundown. In 1996, a nanny in Denmark with a history of mental illness was working for Scientologists, stopped taking her psychiatric medication in an effort to join Scientology, and subsequently mutilated and killed their 18‑month‑old twins.

== Analysis and criticism ==
Scientology analysis and criticism covers the wide range of academic and scholarly perspectives on Scientology, including debates over how the movement should be classified—as a religion, a new religious movement, a business enterprise, a therapy system, or a high control group. Scholars examine Scientology's ideas and practices, its organizational structure, and the role of L. Ron Hubbard in shaping its theology. Researchers also study how Scientology blends ideas from many sources, including Eastern religions, Western esoteric traditions, psychology, and mid-20th-century science fiction. These analyses form the basis for ongoing discussions about Scientology's nature, origins, and place within the study of religion and new religious movements.

Hubbard presented Scientology as a kind of "scientific technology", claiming that its methods were developed through observation and testing, rather than revelation, even though its methods do not follow standards of mainstream science. Scientology's connection to science is often discussed in relation to its origins in self-help movements as well as science fiction culture.

== Reception and influence ==
Scientology has influenced various therapy and spiritual groups formed since the 1960s. Much past-life therapy was influenced by Dianetics, while others, including groups founded by former Scientologists, drew on Scientology.

Many of the organization's critics have utilized the internet, for instance to disseminate leaked confidential documents. The Church of Scientology has sought to sue websites for disseminating Hubbard's writings.

The German government is largely hostile to the Church of Scientology, considering it a threat to democracy, and bars Scientologists in Germany from working in certain roles in the public sector. Scientologists in France have reported being fired or refused jobs because of their beliefs. A 2022 YouGov poll on American attitudes toward religious groups ranked Scientology as the country's least-favored group, with around 50% of respondents indicating a negative view of the practice, alongside Satanism.

Scientology has received an unusually high level of media attention. Hubbard often described journalists in negative terms, calling them "merchants of chaos", and discouraged Scientologists from interacting with journalists.

== Popular culture ==
Scientology has been a prominent and controversial subject in popular culture, inspiring depictions across literature, film, television, music, theatre, video games, and digital media. Since the 1960s, artists and creators have drawn on Scientology's beliefs and practices and its public profile, frequently using them as material for satire, criticism, or fictionalized analogues. These portrayals range from documentaries and dramatic films to comedic treatments and symbolic stand‑ins for the movement. Many works emphasize themes such as secrecy, organizational behavior, celebrity involvement, and the public controversies surrounding Scientology.

== See also ==
- Scientology and religious groups
- Scientology and homosexuality
