= 2013 New Zealand census =

Thirty-third national census of New Zealand

Thirty-third Census of New Zealand
← 2006	5 March 2013; 12 years ago	2018 →

General information
- Country: New Zealand

Results
- Total population: 4,242,048 (▲5.3%)
- Most populous region: Auckland (1,415,550)
- Least populous region: West Coast (32,148)

The 2013 New Zealand census was the thirty-third national census. "The National Census Day" used for the census was on Tuesday, 5 March 2013. The population of New Zealand was counted as 4,242,048 – an increase of 214,101 or 5.3% over the 2006 census.

The 2013 census forms were the same as those developed for the 2011 census which was cancelled due to the major February 2011 earthquake in Christchurch. There were no new topics or questions. New Zealand's next census was conducted in March 2018.

== Collection methods ==
The results from the post-enumeration survey showed that the 2013 census recorded 97.6 percent of the residents in New Zealand on census night. However, the overall response rate was 92.9 percent, with a non-response rate of 7.1 percent made up of the net undercount and people who were counted in the census but had not received a form.

== Results ==
=== Population and dwellings ===
Population counts for New Zealand regions.

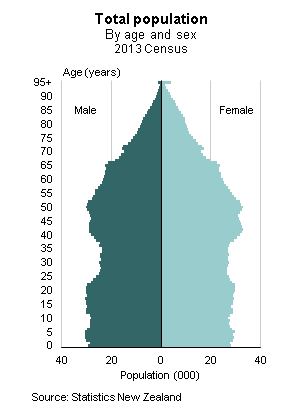
Population pyramid by age and sex.

Note: All figures are for the census usually resident population count.

Region	Population	Percentage
Northland	151,689	3.6%
Auckland	1,415,550	33.4%
Waikato	403,638	9.5%
Bay of Plenty	267,744	6.3%
Gisborne	43,656	1.0%
Taranaki	109,608	2.6%
Manawatū	222,672	5.2%
Hawke's Bay	151,179	3.6%
Wellington	471,315	11.1%
North Island	3,059,418	76.3%
Nelson	46,437	1.1%
Tasman	47,154	1.1%
Marlborough	43,416	1.0%
Canterbury	539,436	12.7%
West Coast	32,148	0.8%
Otago	202,467	4.8%
Southland	93,342	2.2%
South Island	1,004,397	23.7%
Area outside region	600	0.0%
New Zealand	4,242,048	100.0%

=== Ethnicity ===
The census usually resident population count of 4,242,048 included 230,649 people without an ethnic response and 4,011,399 people who identified with at least one ethnicity. The figures for the total ethnicity of the population.

Ethnicity	Responses		Change from 2006	
Ethnicity	Number	%	Number	pp
European	2,969,391	74.02	▲359,802	▲6.42
New Zealand European	2,727,009	67.98	▲345,933	▲6.30
English	38,916	0.97	▼5,286	▼0.17
British nfd	36,024	0.90	▲8,832	▲0.19
South African nec	28,656	0.71	▲7,047	▲0.15
Dutch	28,503	0.71	▼141	▼0.03
European nfd	26,472	0.66	▲4,617	▲0.09
Australian	22,467	0.56	▼3,888	▼0.12
Scottish	14,412	0.36	▼627	▼0.03
Irish	14,193	0.35	▲1,542	▲0.03
German	12,810	0.32	▲1,893	▲0.04
American	12,339	0.31	▲1,533	▲0.03
Māori	598,605	14.92	▲33,276	▲0.28
Pacific peoples	295,941	7.38	▲29,967	▲0.49
Samoan	144,138	3.59	▲13,035	▲0.20
Cook Islands Maori nfd	61,077	1.52	▲4,182	▲0.05
Tongan	60,333	1.50	▲9,852	▲0.20
Niuean	23,883	0.60	▲1,407	▲0.01
Fijian	14,445	0.36	▲4,581	▲0.10
Asian	471,708	11.8	▲117,156	▲2.6
Chinese nfd	163,101	4.07	▲23,370	▲0.45
Indian nfd	143,520	3.58	▲46,077	▲1.05
Filipino	40,350	1.01	▲23,412	▲0.57
Korean	30,171	0.8	▼621	▼0.05
Japanese	14,118	0.35	▲2,208	▲0.04
Fijian Indian	10,929	0.27	▲5,313	▲0.13
Middle Eastern/Latin American/African	46,953	1.17	▲12,210	▲0.27
Other	67,752	1.69	▼363,129	▼9.47
New Zealander	65,973	1.64	▼363,456	▼9.48
Total population stated	4,011,399	–	–	–
Not elsewhere included	230,646	5.4	–	–
Totals, New Zealand	4,242,048	100.0%	214,101	▲5.3%
Source: Statistics NZ. Total may exceed 100% due to multiple response.

==== Ethnic groups by region ====
Region	European		Maori		Pacific		Asian		MELAA (Note: Middle Eastern, Latin American and African)		Other	
Region	Num.	%	Num.	%	Num.	%	Num.	%	Num.	%	Num.	%
Northland	105,060	75.7	44,931	32.4	4,461	3.2	3,927	2.8	555	0.4	2,565	1.8
Auckland	789,306	59.3	142,767	10.7	194,958	14.6	307,233	23.1	24,945	1.9	15,639	1.2
Waikato	296,097	77.4	83,742	21.9	14,700	3.8	26,382	6.9	3,561	0.9	6,660	1.7
Bay of Plenty	189,597	75.7	68,940	27.5	7,728	3.1	12,963	5.2	1,266	0.5	4,407	1.8
Gisborne	24,504	60.8	19,683	48.9	1,542	3.8	975	2.4	159	0.4	624	1.5
Hawke's Bay	110,940	77.7	34,659	24.3	6,270	4.4	5,115	3.6	663	0.5	2,766	1.9
Taranaki	89,802	86.2	18,150	17.4	1,701	1.6	3,594	3.5	444	0.4	2,112	2.0
Manawatu-Whanganui	172,101	81.3	43,596	20.6	7,341	3.5	10,863	5.1	1,335	0.6	4,422	2.1
Wellington	345,180	77.0	58,335	13.0	36,105	8.0	47,235	10.5	6,576	1.5	8,202	1.8
North Island	2,122,587	69.6	514,803	16.9	274,806	9.0	418,287	13.7	39,504	1.3	47,397	1.6
Tasman	42,189	93.1	3,441	7.6	480	1.1	882	1.9	138	0.3	1,083	2.4
Nelson	39,720	89.3	4,167	9.4	798	1.8	1,953	4.4	213	0.5	945	2.1
Marlborough	37,041	89.2	4,776	11.5	969	2.3	1,182	2.8	246	0.6	1,044	2.5
West Coast	27,441	91.2	3,171	10.5	315	1.0	678	2.3	120	0.4	837	2.8
Canterbury	448,650	86.9	41,910	8.1	12,723	2.5	35,847	6.9	4,374	0.8	10,236	2.0
Otago	171,615	89.1	14,388	7.5	3,933	2.0	10,038	5.2	2,043	1.1	4,164	2.2
Southland	79,731	89.0	11,607	13.0	1,917	2.1	2,841	3.2	315	0.4	2,031	2.3
South Island	846,387	88.2	83,460	8.7	21,135	2.2	53,421	5.6	7,449	0.8	20,340	2.1
Source: Statistics New Zealand.

=== Birthplace ===
The number of people living in New Zealand who were born overseas continued to climb. In 2013, 1,001,787 people (25.2 percent) were born overseas. For the overseas-born census "usually resident population":

Proportion of overseas-born population
1. England (21.5%)
2. China (8.90%)
3. India (6.70%)
4. Australia (6.30%)
5. South Africa (5.40%)
6. Fiji (5.30%)
7. Samoa (5.10%)
8. Philippines (3.70%)
9. South Korea (2.70%)
10. Scotland (2.60%)
11. Others (31.8%)

Birthplace	Responses		Change from 2006	
Birthplace	Number	%	Number	pp
New Zealand	2,980,824	74.85	▲20,607	▼2.25
Overseas	1,001,787	25.15	▲122,244	▲2.25
England	215,589	5.41	▲13,188	▲0.14
China, People's Republic of (Note: Does not include Hong Kong SAR and Macau SAR.)	89,121	2.24	▲11,004	▲0.20
India	67,176	1.69	▲23,835	▲0.56
Australia	62,712	1.57	▼30	▼0.06
South Africa	54,276	1.36	▲12,600	▲0.28
Fiji	52,755	1.32	▲15,009	▲0.34
Samoa	50,661	1.27	▲12	▼0.05
Philippines	37,299	0.94	▲22,014	▲0.54
Korea, Republic of	26,601	0.67	▼2,208	▼0.08
Scotland	25,953	0.65	▼3,063	▼0.10
United States	21,462	0.54	▲3,714	▲0.08
Netherlands	19,815	0.50	▼2,289	▼0.08
Germany	12,942	0.32	▲2,181	▲0.04
Japan	10,269	0.26	▲696	▲0.01
Total people stated	3,982,611	100.00%	–	–
Not elsewhere included	259,437	–	–	–
Total people	4,242,048	100.00%	214,101	▲5.3%
Source: Statistics New Zealand.

=== Religion ===
Largest religious denomination in each territorial authority. (2013)

The table below is based on religious affiliation data recorded at the last three censuses for usually resident people. Figures and percentages may not add to 100 percent as people can state more than one religion.

Religion	2013 Census (Note: The 2011 Census was cancelled due to the 2011 Christchurch earthquake; the 2013 census replaced it.)	
Religion	Number	Percentage
Christian	1,858,977	47.65%
Catholic	492,105	12.61%
Anglican	459,771	11.79%
Presbyterian, Congregational and Reformed	330,516	8.47%
Christian (not further defined)	216,177	5.54%
Methodist	102,879	2.64%
Pentecostal	74,256	1.90%
Baptist	54,345	1.39%
Latter–day Saints	40,728	1.04%
Brethren	18,624	0.48%
Jehovah's Witnesses	17,931	0.46%
Adventist	17,085	0.44%
Evangelical, Born Again and Fundamentalist	15,381	0.39%
Orthodox	13,806	0.35%
Salvation Army	9,162	0.23%
Protestant (not further defined)	4,998	0.13%
Lutheran	3,903	0.10%
Church of Christ and Associated Churches of Christ	2,145	0.05%
Uniting/Union Church and Ecumenical	999	0.03%
Asian Christian	132	0.01%
Other Christian	3,714	0.10%
Hindu	89,319	2.11%
Buddhist	58,404	1.50%
Māori Christian	52,947	1.36%
Rātana	40,353	1.03%
Ringatū	13,272	0.34%
Māori Christian (not further defined)	222	0.01%
Other Māori Christian	333	0.01%
Islam/Muslim	46,149	1.18%
Spiritualism and New Age Religions	18,285	0.47%
Spiritualist	7,776	0.20%
Nature and Earth Based Religions	5,943	0.15%
Satanism	840	0.02%
New Age (not further defined)	441	0.01%
Church of Scientology	318	0.01%
Other New Age Religions	3,015	0.08%
Judaism/Jewish	6,867	0.18%
Other Religions	34,245	0.88%
Sikh	19,191	0.49%
Other Religion (not further defined)	5,202	0.13%
Baháʼí	2,634	0.07%
Māori Religion	2,595	0.07%
Theism	1,782	0.05%
Zoroastrian	972	0.02%
Chinese Religions	906	0.02%
Japanese Religions	423	0.01%
Jainism	207	0.01%
Other Other Religions	333	0.01%
Total people with at least one religious affiliation	2,146,167	55.01%
No Religion	1,635,345	41.92%
Object to answering	173,034	4.44%
Total people stated	3,901,167	100.00%
Not elsewhere included (Note: Includes don't know, religion unidentifiable, response outside scope (e.g., Jedi Knight or Pastafarian), and not stated.)	347,301	–
New Zealand	4,242,048	–

== See also ==
- 2013 in New Zealand
- 2018 New Zealand census
- New Zealand census
