= Scientology analysis and criticism =

Scientology analysis and criticism covers the wide range of academic and scholarly perspectives on Scientology, including debates over how the movement should be classified—as a religion, a new religious movement, a business enterprise, a therapy system, or a high control group. Scholars examine Scientology's ideas and practices, its organizational structure, and the role of L. Ron Hubbard in shaping its theology. Researchers also study how Scientology blends ideas from many sources, including Eastern religions, Western esoteric traditions, psychology, and mid-20th-century science fiction. These analyses form the basis for ongoing discussions about Scientology's nature, origins, and place within the study of religion and new religious movements.

== Overview ==
Vast amounts have been written about Scientology, both in support and opposition to it. Much of this literature has been heavily polarized. Scientology has attracted negative publicity since its founding, with criticism of Scientology organizations coming from government agencies, the media, anti-cult groups, and ex-members.

Academic research into Scientology was for several decades comparatively limited compared to the media and public interest in it. This has been attributed to the organization's secrecy, its reputation for litigiousness, and a lack of academic access to documentary material about the organization. Research intensified in the early 21st century, and in 2014, the first academic conference on the topic was held in Belgium. Several academics who have studied the movement have described the organization paying close attention to their work by telephoning them and sending representatives to attend their talks on the subject. Some observers of Scientology have also been critical of scholars studying it because they allege that scholars frequently act as apologists for it.

== Definition ==
L. Ron Hubbard stated that the term "Scientology" derived from "scios" and "ology", which he defined as "knowing about knowing" or "the science of knowledge". Scholars have noted that the name echoes the language of science and have argued that it was chosen in part to draw on the cultural authority associated with scientific terminology. The word "scientology" had appeared in print earlier, though it is unclear whether Hubbard was aware of these earlier usages. Allen Upward used it in The New Word (1901) to describe uncritical acceptance of scientific doctrine. In 1934, Anastasius Nordenholz used the term in a philosophical work to mean "the science of the constitution and usefulness of knowledge".

In his history of the Church of Scientology, the scholar Hugh Urban describes Scientology as a "huge, complex, and multifaceted movement." According to Urban, Scientology represents a "rich syncretistic blend" of sources, including elements from Hinduism and Buddhism, Thelema, new scientific ideas, science-fiction, and from psychology and popular self-help literature available by the mid-20th century. The sociologist Stephen A. Kent views the Church of Scientology as "a multifaceted transnational corporation, only one element of which is religious".

Hubbard claimed that Scientology was "all-denominational", and members of the Scientology organization are not prohibited from active involvement in religions. Scholar of religion Donald Westbrook encountered members who also practiced Judaism, Christianity, Buddhism, and the Nation of Islam; one was a Baptist minister. In practice, however, Westbrook noted that most members consider Scientology to be their only commitment, and the deeper their involvement became, the less likely they were to continue practicing other traditions. The ceremonies, structure of the prayers, and minister attire suggested by Hubbard reflect his own Protestant traditions.

Scientology has experienced multiple schisms during its history. While the Church of Scientology was the original promoter of the movement, various factions have split off to form independent Scientology groups. Referring to the "different types of Scientology", the scholar of religion Aled Thomas suggests it was appropriate to talk about "Scientologies".

== Science and technology ==
Hubbard presented Scientology as a kind of "scientific technology", claiming that its methods were developed through observation and testing, rather than revelation, even though its methods do not follow standards of mainstream science. Scientology's connection to science is often discussed in relation to its origins in self-help movements as well as science fiction culture.

The Church considers itself scientific, although this belief has no basis in institutional science. According to religious scholar Mikael Rothstein Scientologists believe that "all religious claims can be verified through experimentation". Scientologists believe that their religion was derived through scientific methods, that Hubbard found knowledge through studying and thinking, not through revelation. The "science" of Dianetics, however, was never accepted by the scientific community. Rothstein also writes that there is a possibility that Scientology partly owes its existence to the conflict with the conventional scientific community, which hindered Hubbard's original intention. Religious scholar Dorthe Refslund Christensen notes that Scientology differs from the scientific method in that Scientology has become increasingly self-referential, while true science normally compares competing theories and observed facts.

Hubbard initially claimed and insisted that Dianetics was based on the scientific method. He taught that "the scientific sensibilities [carry] over into the spiritual realities one encounters via auditing on the e-meter." Scientologists commonly prefer to describe Hubbard's teachings with words such as knowledge, technology, and workability rather than belief or faith. Hubbard described Dianetics and Scientology as "technologies" based on his claim of their "scientific precision and workability." Hubbard attempted to "break down the barrier between scientific (objective, external) and religious (subjective, internal) forms of knowledge." Hubbard describes Scientology's epistemology as "radically subjective: Nothing in Scientology is true for you unless you have observed it and it is true according to your observation." This is a type of self-legitimation through science which is also found in other religions such as Christian Science, Religious Science, and Moorish Science Temple of America.

Sociologist William Sims Bainbridge cites Scientology's origins in the subcultures of science fiction and "harmony" with scientific cosmology. Science fiction, viewed to work for and against the purposes of science, has contributed to the birth of new religions, including Scientology. While it promotes science, it distorts it as well. Science fiction writer A.E. van Vogt based the early development of Dianetics and Scientology on a novel based on General Semantics, a self-improvement and therapy program created by Alfred Korzybski to cure personal and social issues.

Scientologists believe that Hubbard "discovered the existential truths that form their doctrine through research," thus leading to the idea that Scientology is science. Hubbard created what the Church would call a "spiritual technology" to advance the goals of Scientology. According to the Church, "Scientology works 100 percent of the time when it is properly applied to a person who sincerely desires to improve his life." The underlying claims are that Scientology is "exact" and "certain". Michael Shermer, writing for Scientific American in 2011, said that Scientology's methods lacked enough study to qualify as a science, but that the story of Xenu and Scientology's other creation myths were no less tenable than other religions.

B. Hubbard, J. Hatfield, and J. Santucci compare Scientology's view of humanity to the Yogachara school of Buddhism, saying that both have been described as "the most scientific" among new and traditional religions, respectively. They cite technical language and claims that teachings were developed through observation and experimentation. They also emphasize that many investigators and researchers consider Scientology to be a pseudoscience because of its absolute and meta-empirical goals.

Scholar Kocku von Stuckrad stated that Scientology is an example of the phenomenon of both the "scientification of religion" and the "sacralization" of science. Donald A. Westbrook argues that there is an "ongoing and dialectical relationship" between religion and science in Hubbard's teachings.

== Classification ==
Debate as to whether Scientology should be regarded as a religion, a cult, a business, or a scam has continued over many years.

Many Scientologists consider it to be their religion. Its founder, L. Ron Hubbard, presented it as a religion, but the early history of the Scientology organization, and Hubbard's policy directives, letters, and instructions to subordinates, indicate that his motivation for doing so was as a legally pragmatic move to minimize his tax burden and escape the possibility of prosecution. In many countries, the Church of Scientology has engaged in extensive litigation to secure recognition as a tax-exempt religious organization, and it has managed to obtain such a status in a few jurisdictions, including the United States, Italy, and Australia. The organization has not received recognition as a religious institution in the majority of countries in which it operates.

Government inquiries, international parliamentary bodies, scholars, law lords, and numerous superior court judgments describe Scientology both as a dangerous cult and as a manipulative profit-making business. These institutions and scholars state that Scientology is not a religion. An article in Time magazine, "The Thriving Cult of Greed and Power", describes Scientology as a ruthless global scam. The Church of Scientology's attempts to sue the publishers for libel and to prevent republication abroad were dismissed.

Psychologists and skeptics support this view of Scientology as a confidence trick to obtain money from its targets. The academic Benjamin Beit-Hallahmi observes that "the majority of activities conducted by Scientology and its many fronts and subsidiaries involve the marketing of secular products." Scholars and journalists note that profit is the primary motivating goal of Hubbard's Scientology groups. Those making this observation have often referred to a governing financial policy issued by Hubbard that is to be obeyed by all Scientology organization staff members, which includes the following [uppercase in original]:

Make sure that lots of bodies move through the shop...A. MAKE MONEY. ... J. MAKE MONEY. K. MAKE MORE MONEY. L. MAKE OTHER PEOPLE PRODUCE SO AS TO MAKE MONEY...However you get them in or why, just do it.

Some scholars of religion have referred to Scientology as a religion. The sociologist Bryan R. Wilson compares Scientology with 20 criteria that he associated with religion and concludes that the movement could be characterized as such. Wilson's criteria include a cosmology that describes a human reality beyond terrestrial existence; ethics and behavior teachings that are based on this cosmology; prescribed ways for followers to connect with spiritual beings; and a congregation that believes in and helps spread its teachings. Alan W. Black analyzed Scientology through the seven "dimensions of religion" set forward by the scholar Ninian Smart and also decided that Scientology met those criteria for being a religion. The sociologist David V. Barrett noted that there was a "strong body of evidence to suggest that it makes sense to regard Scientology as a religion", while scholar of religion James R. Lewis comments that "it is obvious that Scientology is a religion". The scholar Mikael Rothstein observes that the Scientology "is best understood as a devotional cult aimed at revering the mythologized founder of the organization". Opinion polling in 2012 shows that in its home market, the US, 70% of Americans do not think Scientology is a real religion; 13% think it is. A 2015 poll in the UK shows 61% of British people do not think Scientology is a real religion; 8% think it is.

The characterisation as a religion by such religious studies academics is disputed by the psychology professor Benjamin Beit-Hallahmi. He writes that: "Scientology cannot be classified as a religion. Because Scientology is a profit-oriented organization, sometimes, not always, masquerading as a religion, it has faced serious legitimation problems...The extreme measures Scientology has taken to defend itself reflect the truly precarious position of an organization with clearly illegitimate goals and a fraudulent operational style." Beit-Hallahmi notes that the degree of collaboration with Scientology in the new religious movement (NRM) research network is in a class by itself. He observes that "Scholars collaborating with Scientology have tried to provide an umbrella of legitimacy. Moreover, they have knowingly collaborated in some of its deceptive schemes and front organizations."

Numerous religious studies scholars have described Scientology as a new religious movement. Various scholars have also considered it within the category of Western esotericism, while the scholar of religion Andreas Grünschloß noted that it was "closely linked" to UFO religions, as science-fiction themes are evident in its theology. Scholars have also varyingly described it as a "psychotherapeutically oriented religion", a "secularized religion", a "postmodern religion", a "privatized religion", and a "progressive-knowledge" religion. According to scholar of religion Mary Farrell Bednarowski, Scientology describes itself as drawing on science, religion, psychology and philosophy but "has been claimed by none of them and repudiated, for the most part, by all".

Some government bodies and other institutions maintain that the Scientology is a secular, profit-making organization, and many commentators claim that is a form of therapy masquerading as religion. The French government characterizes the movement as a dangerous cult, and the German government monitors it as an anti-democratic cult.

The notion of Scientology as a religion is strongly opposed by the anti-cult movement. Its claims to a religious identity have been particularly rejected in continental Europe. Grünschloß writes that labeling Scientology a religion does not mean that it is "automatically promoted as harmless, nice, good, and humane". The multi-faceted nature of the Church of Scientology that includes pedagogy, communication theories, management principles and methods for a healthy living discombobulated many observers when it first started. Dericquebourg comments that the same things can be found in established churches.

== Religious studies ==
Hugh B. Urban writes that "Scientology's efforts to get itself defined as a religion make it an ideal case study for thinking about how we understand and define religion." Frank K. Flinn, adjunct professor of religious studies at Washington University in St. Louis wrote, "it is abundantly clear that Scientology has both the typical forms of ceremonial and celebratory worship and its own unique form of spiritual life."

Flinn further states that religion requires "beliefs in something transcendental or ultimate, practices (rites and codes of behavior) that re-inforce those beliefs and, a community that is sustained by both the beliefs and practices", all of which are present within Scientology. Similarly, World Religions in America states that "Scientology contains the same elements of most other religions, including myths, scriptures, doctrines, worship, sacred practices and rituals, moral and ethical expectations, a community of believers, clergy, and ecclesiastic organizations." According to Mikhael Rothstein, Scientology's rituals can be classified into 1) those with the purpose of changing the person, such as auditing; 2) collective, which are calendar events where Scientology, its community and L. Ron Hubbard are celebrated; 3) rites of passage 4) weekly services that are similar to Christian services.

While acknowledging that a number of his colleagues accept Scientology as a religion, sociologist Stephen A. Kent writes: "Rather than struggling over whether or not to label Scientology as a religion, I find it far more helpful to view it as a multifaceted transnational corporation, only one element of which is religious" [emphasis in the original]. Donna Batten in the Gale Encyclopedia of American Law writes, "A belief does not need to be stated in traditional terms to fall within First Amendment protection. For example, Scientology – a system of beliefs that a human being is essentially a free and immortal spirit who merely inhabits a body – does not propound the existence of a supreme being, but it qualifies as a religion under the broad definition propounded by the Supreme Court."

A great number of research archives on Scientology have emerged in recent years for the academic study of Scientology. These include collections in San Diego State University, University of California, Santa Barbara, University of California, Los Angeles, Graduate Theological Union, Berkeley, Ohio State University and Claremont College Library. There is also a big collection of alternative beliefs and religions at the University of Alberta Library in Canada, where scholar Stephen A. Kent "makes material available on a restricted bases to undergraduate and graduate students."

The material contained in the OT levels has been characterized as bad science fiction by critics, while others claim it bears structural similarities to gnostic thought and ancient Hindu beliefs of creation and cosmic struggle. Donald A. Westbrook suggests that there are three areas of research scholars should consider researching and writing about: the biographical life and legacy of L. Ron Hubbard, the Church of Scientology's social betterment programs, and derivative scientology.

== Influences ==
The general orientation of Hubbard's philosophy owes much to Will Durant, author of the popular 1926 classic The Story of Philosophy; Dianetics is dedicated to Durant. Hubbard's view of a mechanically functioning mind in particular finds close parallels in Durant's work on Spinoza. According to Hubbard himself, Scientology is "the Western anglicized continuance of many early forms of wisdom". Ankerberg and Weldon mention the sources of Scientology to include "the Vedas, Buddhism, Judaism, Gnosticism, Taoism, early Greek civilization and the teachings of Jesus, Nietzsche and Freud". Hubbard had an inaccurate and superficial understanding of the major Eastern religious traditions, despite his claims of similarities to Scientology. His self-proclaimed association with Buddhism's Maitreya was an attempt on his part to enhance his image and add respectability to his organisation's beliefs. Aside from superficial similarities between Scientology and Hinayana Buddhism that might have motivated him to draw spurious associations between the two belief systems, Hubbard may have written about Eastern faiths because his Western members were unlikely to have sufficient knowledge of them to assess the validity of his claims.

Hubbard asserted that Freudian thought was a "major precursor" to Scientology. W. Vaughn Mccall, Professor and Chairman of the Georgia Regents University writes, "Both Freudian theory and Hubbard assume that there are unconscious mental processes that may be shaped by early life experiences, and that these influence later behavior and thought." Both schools of thought propose a "tripartite structure of the mind". Sigmund Freud's psychology, popularized in the 1930s and 1940s, was a key contributor to the Dianetics therapy model, and was acknowledged unreservedly as such by Hubbard in his early works. Hubbard never forgot, when he was 12 years old, meeting Cmdr. Joseph Cheesman Thompson, a U.S. Navy officer who had studied with Freud and when writing to the American Psychological Association in 1949, he stated that he was conducting research based on the "early work of Freud".

In Dianetics, Hubbard cites Hegel as a negative influence – an object lesson in "confusing" writing. According to Mary A. Mann, Scientology is considered nondenominational, accepting all people regardless of their religions background, ethnicity, or educational attainment. Another influence was Alfred Korzybski's General Semantics. Hubbard was friends with fellow science fiction writers A. E. van Vogt and Robert Heinlein, who both wrote science-fiction inspired by Korzybski's writings, such as Vogt's The World of Null-A. Hubbard's view of the reactive mind has acknowledged parallels with Korzybski's thought; in fact, Korzybski's "anthropometer" may have been what inspired Hubbard's invention of the E-meter.

Beyond that, Hubbard himself named a great many other influences in his own writing – in Scientology 8-8008, for example, these include philosophers from Anaxagoras and Aristotle to Herbert Spencer and Voltaire, physicists and mathematicians like Euclid and Isaac Newton, as well as founders of religions such as Buddha, Confucius, Jesus and Mohammed—but there is little evidence in Hubbard's writings that he studied these figures to any great depth.

As noted, elements of the Eastern religions are evident in Scientology, in particular the concept of karma found in Hinduism and Jainism. According to the Encyclopedia of Community, Scientology "shows affinities with Buddhism and a remarkable similarity to first-century Gnosticism".

== See also ==
- Scientology controversies
- Bibliography of books critical of Scientology
