= Retail, Wholesale and Department Store Union, Local 580 v Dolphin Delivery Ltd =

- Supreme Court of Canada

Hearing: December 6 and 7, 1984 Judgment: December 18, 1986
- Full case name: Retail, Wholesale and Department Store Union, Local 580, Al Peterson and Donna Alexander v Dolphin Delivery Limited
- Citations: [1986] 2 S.C.R. 573
- Prior history: Judgment for defendant (British Columbia Court of Appeal)
- Ruling: Appeal dismissed

Holding
- The Charter applies to all codified law but common law only when it is the basis of government action.

Court membership
- Chief Justice: Brian Dickson; Puisne Justices: Roland Ritchie, Jean Beetz, Willard Estey, William McIntyre, Julien Chouinard, Antonio Lamer, Bertha Wilson, Gerald Le Dain

Reasons given
- Majority: McIntyre, joined by Dickson, Estey, Chouinard and Le Dain
- Concurrence: Wilson
- Concurrence: Beetz
- Ritchie and Lamer took no part in the consideration or decision of the case.

Retail, Wholesale and Department Store Union, Local 580 v Dolphin Delivery Ltd, [1986] 2 S.C.R. 573, is the seminal Canadian Charter of Rights and Freedoms decision that states that the Charter applies to governmental action, and to the common law except where matters are solely between private parties. Nevertheless, judges should interpret the common law in the light of the Charter.

== Background ==
The Retail, Wholesale and Department Store Union applied to the court to have Dolphin Delivery and Supercourier declared allies of Purolator, an employer of union members. This would have allowed the union to picket Dolphin while its employees would not have to cross the picket line.

The BC Labour Board declined to hear an application since the dispute was governed under the Canada Labour Code, as Purolator was an interprovincial company.

Dolphin obtained an injunction against secondary picketing on their premises on the basis that the common law does not permit secondary picketing.

The action was brought by the union on the basis that their rights to freedom of expression (section 2(b)) and freedom of association (section 2(d)) under the Charter were violated.

== Reasoning of the Court ==
McIntyre, writing for the court, looked at section 52(1) of the Constitution Act, 1982, which stated that any law inconsistent with the Charter is of no force or effect. The court stated that this should be interpreted broadly and thus must include both statute law and common law. However, this interpretation needed to be reconciled with section 32 which states that the Charter should apply only to Parliament and legislatures. The Court gave preference to section 32 and stated that the Charter will apply to common law only where the government is involved.

The issue of whether the courts were included within the meaning of government was considered. The Court found that orders from the court did not constitute government action, rather the courts must be the neutral arbiters and cannot be included without unduly widening the scope of the Charter. The legislative, executive, and administrative branches, however, fall within the purview of government.

The final judgement of the court succinctly stated by McIntyre J.(at paras. 1 & 2):

1 The Charter does not directly apply to the common law unless it is the basis of some governmental action.
2 Even though the Charter does not directly apply to the common law absent government action, the common law must nonetheless be developed in accordance with Charter values.

To the same effect, see Hill v. Church of Scientology of Toronto, (1995) 2 S.C.R. 1130, R. v. Salituro, (1991) 3 S.C.R. 654, Dagenais v. Canadian Broadcasting Corp., (1994) 3 S.C.R. 835, and R. v. Park, (1995) 2 S.C.R. 836, per L'Heureux-Dubé J.

== Aftermath ==
Much of the principles from this case remain today, except for the opinion that court orders were exempted from Charter scrutiny. R. v. Rahey, [1987] 1 S.C.R. 58 reversed this and held that all courts are subject to the Charter.
