= Lawrence Wollersheim =

Critic of Scientology

- Born: 1948 or 1949 (age 76–77)
- Known for: Winning a lawsuit against the Church of Scientology, and FACTNet

Lawrence Dominick Wollersheim is an American former Scientologist who won a court judgement against Church of Scientology for compensation for the organization's fraud, intentional infliction of emotional injury, and negligent infliction of emotional injury.

Wollersheim sued the Church of Scientology in 1980. The story of Xenu was made public when Church materials detailing the Operating Thetan Level 3 were used as exhibits. In Wollersheim's court case, Scientology's "top secret" materials about Xenu and their beliefs in past alien invasions of Earth was filed with the Los Angeles court on his behalf and then copied from court records and published by media all over the world. Wollersheim won the case and was ultimately awarded $2.5 million in 1989 (equivalent to $6.5 million in 2025). Officials from the Scientology organization said they would not pay the judgement. The organization removed assets from the Church of Scientology legal entity against which the judgement was made, in order to fraudulently claim it was bankrupt, but in 2002 it was forced to pay the award with interest, totalling $8.7 million (equivalent to $15.6 million in 2025).

Wollersheim co-founded Factnet.org in 1993, an organization whose stated goal was to help other victims of cult abuse. He has since been active with several other non-profit organizations.

== Wollersheim v. Church of Scientology ==
=== Background ===
Wollersheim first got into Scientology in 1969. In 1973, he joined Scientology's Sea Org and worked at the Celebrity Centre, and later was sent to Scientology's ship, the Bolivar. There, he was put on a strenuous work regime of 19-hour days and forced to sleep nine deep in the ship's hold. He tried to escape the ship because he felt he was losing his mind, but he was captured and returned. He was convinced to disconnect from his wife, parents, and other family members, and was threatened with a freeloader bill if he left. At times he was locked in the ship's hold for 18 hours a day, deprived of sleep, and fed only once a day.

Wollersheim said "I went psychotic on OT III. I lost a sense of who I was." In 1979, he contemplated suicide, and Scientology forced him into more auditing. He had two further psychotic breaks during auditing procedures.

Wollersheim left the Sea Org and had been operating a business selling photography; almost all of his clients and 132 employees were Scientologists. When Scientology started their fair game tactics, they instructed all Scientologists to resign from working for him, to stop placing new orders, and stop paying any bills owed – driving Wollersheim into bankruptcy. His mental condition deteriorated, and he ended up under psychiatric care.

=== The lawsuit ===
In 1980, Wollersheim filed a lawsuit against the Church of Scientology alleging fraud, intentional infliction of emotional injury, and negligent infliction of emotional injury.

To derail the lawsuit, Scientology filed a RICO lawsuit against Wollersheim, and then a second, third, and fourth lawsuit – each were thrown out by the courts. They sued his attorneys and expert witnesses and started a campaign to discredit or blackmail one of his attorneys. The church also harassed the judge in the case, who claims he was followed, had his tires slashed, and his pet dog drowned in his pool.

During the five months of testimony, expert witnesses testified that the auditing and disconnection practices caused Wollersheim's mental illness. They also introduced evidence detailing Scientology's retribution policy, called Fair Game.

In July 1986, the jury awarded $5 million in compensatory damages and $25 million in punitive damages.

=== The OT III secret documents ===
During the trial, the OT III documents had been presented as evidence in the case and the judge announced that they would be made public. Not wanting their secret documents disclosed, 1,500 Scientologists crammed three floors of the courthouse in an attempt to block public access to their confidential "scriptures" by each requesting to photocopy the documents and overwhelming the clerk's office so no one else could access them. Despite their efforts, the Los Angeles Times was able to get a copy and published a summary of them, which was enthusiastically taken up by newspapers throughout the US.

Worse than the financial loss was the derision that greeted the church all over the world and the loss of control of its secret doctrines. The church has never recovered from the blow.

— Lawrence Wright

=== "Not one thin dime for Wollersheim" ===
Scientology officials vowed never to pay the fines, stating:

It was a stunning blow to Scientology, but probably the most lasting impression that many took from the trial was the reaction of Scientologists themselves, who continued to protest at the courthouse day after day for more than a month after the verdict. Staging their demonstrations from a tent city set up across the street, the members wore pins made from ten cent coins and chanted over and over: "Not one thin dime for Wollersheim!"

— Tony Ortega

The Church of Scientology appealed the judgment and the award was reduced to $2.5 million in 1989. The church challenged the $2.5 million award, but the case was dismissed and Wollersheim was awarded an additional $130,506.71 in attorney's fees.

Scientology had gutted the assets of the Church of Scientology of California, the defendant in the case, and claimed it was bankrupt and couldn't pay the judgment. Over the next few years, the Wollersheim side put together detailed evidence proving that Scientology had siphoned and moved assets from the California corporation to other organizations within the Scientology network.

Just one hour before a hearing that would have presented that evidence, on May 9, 2002 the Church of Scientology wrote a check for almost $8.7 million to pay off the judgment with interest. According to attorneys familiar with Scientology litigation, Wollersheim's judgment is considered the first Scientology has ever paid outright.

=== $8.7 million ===
The courts doled out the money – $5.4 million to pay off Wollersheim's attorneys and some to pay off Wollersheim's tax obligations on the award. "On September 30, Los Angeles Superior Court Judge Robert Hess granted Wollersheim's motion for the release to him of the remaining impounded funds, amounting to about $1.8 million."

Attorney Leta Schlosser, who had already received $100,000, sued for a further $5.3 million. In 2006, Judge Hess said Schlosser lacked an enforceable lien under the Rules of Professional Conduct, and a jury awarded her $313,000, which was promptly paid.

== FACTNet ==
In 1993, Wollersheim co-founded FACTNet (F.A.C.T.Net) with Bob Penny.

In 1995, Wollersheim's Boulder apartment was raided by federal marshals with Church of Scientology officials and his computers were seized as evidence.
