= R v Church of Scientology of Toronto =

Breach of public trust

The Queen v. Church of Scientology of Toronto was a 1992 Canadian criminal case involving the Church of Scientology and members of the organization, resulting in a conviction on two counts of breach of the public trust. It also involved previously untested sections of the Canadian Charter of Rights and Freedoms.

== Preceding ==
An investigation into the Church of Scientology's activities in Ontario was begun when stolen documents from public and private agencies as well as information on other covert activities in Canada turned up as part of the evidence collected in the Operation Snow White case in the U.S.

On March 3–4, 1983, police raided the Scientology headquarters in Toronto and seized an estimated 250,000 documents in more than 900 boxes.

== Trial ==
The trial began on April 23, 1991.

It was during this case that the events that sparked the case of Hill v. Church of Scientology of Toronto occurred.

== Results ==
On June 25, 1992, seven members were convicted for operations against the Ontario Provincial Police, the Ontario Ministry of the Attorney General and the Royal Canadian Mounted Police (RCMP). The Church of Scientology itself was convicted on two counts of breach of the public trust: infiltration of the offices of the Ontario Provincial Police and the Ontario Ministry of the Attorney General. The Church of Scientology was ordered to pay a $250,000 fine, and three individuals were fined — Jacqueline Matz was fined $5,000, Ms. Wheeler and Donald Whitmore were each fined $2,000.

== Appeal ==
The case was appealed in 1996 before the Court of Appeal for Ontario by the Church of Scientology and one of the individual defendants, Jacqueline Matz. The appellants advanced numerous grounds of appeal, some of which were abandoned at the hearing, and the remainder of which were rejected by the Court.

== See also ==
- Hill v Church of Scientology of Toronto
- Scientology and law
