= Steven Fishman =

American former Scientologist

Steven Fishman (born 1949) is an American former Scientologist whose inclusion of Scientology's secret Operating Thetan levels in a court filing led to the first public confirmation by the Church of Scientology of its doctrines regarding Xenu and the Wall of Fire.

Fishman was serving a 21-year sentence on charges of wire fraud and money laundering, and was scheduled to be released on October 28, 2028. He was released on January 8, 2021.

== Fraud scheme ==
The origins of Fishman's dispute with the Church of Scientology lay in a fraud scheme he conducted from 1983 to 1988. Fishman joined dozens of class action lawsuits by presenting stock purchase confirmations he had stolen from his employer and forged. In this manner, he made approximately one million dollars, as much as 30 percent of which he spent on Scientology materials and services. Fishman was arrested in July 1988 and charged with several counts of fraud. The FBI also investigated the possibility of church involvement in the scheme.

Fishman's attorney, Marc Nurik, had planned to use an insanity defense, offering false memory syndrome theorist Richard Ofshe and psychologist Margaret Singer as expert witnesses. Fishman sat for a seven-part videotaped interview with Ofshe and Nurik. In the interview, he discussed in detail various aspects of Scientology doctrine, his own Scientology involvement, and the church's response to his arrest. Fishman claimed that church staff had ordered him to murder his psychologist, Uwe Geertz, who had knowledge of his Scientology involvement, and then to commit suicide.

At the same time, according to Fishman, he participated in a conspiracy with church staff to deflect accusations of church involvement, by submitting fake documents and making false statements to his defense team. For these acts he was further charged with obstruction of justice. The court ultimately blocked Nurik's defense strategy by rejecting both expert witnesses, based on the testimony of opposing expert Dick Anthony. Fishman pleaded guilty to one count of mail fraud and one count of obstruction, and the court sentenced him on July 20, 1990, to five years imprisonment in the Butner Federal Correctional Institution. Fishman later claimed that the church hired Scientologist inmate Luis Martinez to kill him in prison. He was paroled in mid-1993.

According to Anthony, who had opposed Ofshe and Singer, Fishman's criminal case was one of several in which they had attempted to introduce their ideas of coercive persuasion by religious groups. The court's admissibility ruling came as a setback to American critics of cults. Ofshe and Singer sued Anthony unsuccessfully, claiming that he mischaracterized the basis of their theories in this and other cases.

== Libel case ==
In 1991, while Fishman was still incarcerated, Time magazine published a highly critical cover story on Scientology by Richard Behar. The story mentioned Fishman's fraud conviction and the alleged plot to eliminate him and Geertz. The church responded by filing libel lawsuits against Time Warner, Behar, and Fishman and Geertz jointly.

In support of his contention that he had been brainwashed and ordered to murder Geertz, Fishman attached a series of documents to a motion to reconsider venue. This filing has since become known as the Fishman Affidavit. It included purported Scientology documents describing obstructionist tactics to use in the event of an arrest, as well as versions of Operating Thetan levels I through VII and purported excerpts of OT VIII. Fishman's filing placed the advanced materials on record at the district court, available for viewing by the general public. Despite an unsuccessful church motion to seal the court record and efforts to keep the court files continuously checked out, former Scientologist Arnaldo Lerma obtained the affidavit and posted it on the internet, after which it spread uncontrollably. In the process of suing Lerma for copyright infringement, the church confirmed that the copies of levels I through VII were accurate.

A federal district court summarily dismissed the church's claims against Time Warner and Behar, finding that they had not acted with actual malice insofar as the church was concerned. The church dropped its claims against Fishman and Geertz after Geertz's legal team served subpoenas upon such Scientologist celebrities as Kelly Preston, Juliette Lewis and Isaac Hayes. The court record in the Fishman case remained open to the public.

== Wollersheim litigation ==
Fishman submitted a declaration on behalf of Lawrence Wollersheim in 1993, claiming firsthand knowledge of tactics the Church had used to interfere with Wollersheim's lawsuit against the church. In the declaration (affidavit), Fishman alleged the Church had drowned the trial judge's dog and made harassing phone calls to Wollersheim at night.

== Authenticity of Fishman's Church History ==
A substantial amount of controversy regarding Fishman's involvement with the Church of Scientology has emerged in the decades since the affair. The allegations calling Fishman's involvement into question initially came solely from the Church (CoS) itself and their legal representation, who pursued the libel suit after discovering that he was not in their member data or records. In August 2015, prolific Scientology critic and investigator Tony Ortega published an exposé on the Fishman Case; in which he characterizes Steven Fishman as a "squirrel" (or Independent Scientologist). He describes Fishman as follows:

"Actual longtime Scientologists will tell you that the material in [Fishman's] book, as well as Fishman's statements on his notorious set of videos (recorded by his attorney to prove to the court that Fishman was a lunatic) prove that Fishman was never a Scientologist, but a nutcase who had amassed a huge library of Scientology materials which he studied closely so he could talk as though he knew what he was talking about — at least to the uninitiated."

— Tony Ortega, Why Steve Fishman — of the notorious Fishman Papers — is today serving 21 years in prison

In addition to there being no historical Scientology completions for Steven Fishman listed, produced, or published, many since-apostatized Scientologists named in Fishman's self-published memoir, Lonesome Squirrel, have categorically refuted the events of the book mentioning them, and denied having known him altogether. Fishman himself has long asserted that he received OT levels I to VII and VIII respectively from two Sea Org members on separate instances. Ortega, though professing skepticism regarding this, states that he believes the OT-VIII document to be authentic nonetheless.

As we began reading "Lonesome Squirrel," we realized that some of the people named in it have, 20 years later, come out of the church. So we reached out to them and they confirmed for us that nothing in the book associated with them actually happened. "Lonesome Squirrel" is an incredibly creative work of fiction that has enough actual names and locations and quotations from L. Ron Hubbard's work that it has a veneer of authenticity.

— Tony Ortega, Why Steve Fishman — of the notorious Fishman Papers — is today serving 21 years in prison
