= Fishman Affidavit =

Documents of Scientology's secret materials

The Fishman Affidavit is a set of court documents submitted by self-professed ex-Scientologist Steven Fishman in 1993 in the federal case, Church of Scientology International v. Fishman and Geertz (Case No. CV 91-6426 (HLH (Tx) United States District Court for the Central District of California).

The affidavit contained criticisms of the Church of Scientology and substantial portions of the Operating Thetan auditing and course materials.

== Church of Scientology International v. Fishman and Geertz ==
The documents were brought as exhibits attached to a declaration by Steven Fishman on 9 April 1993 as part of Church of Scientology International v. Fishman and Geertz. Along with Kendrick Moxon and Laurie Bartilson, Timothy Bowles was one of the lead attorneys for the Church of Scientology in the case.

Fishman told the court that he had committed crimes on behalf of the Church. He also attested that he was assigned to murder his psychologist, Uwe Geertz, and then commit suicide. Fishman received a mail fraud conviction three years earlier, and he claimed being brainwashed by the Church and that he had committed the crime to cover the cost of his Scientology sessions. The court rejected Fishman's defense and he was soon after sued for libel by Scientology.

As evidence, Fishman submitted course materials he said that he purchased from Ellie Bolger, a fellow Scientologist, and Richard Ofshe, an expert witness for his defense. The Church says the documents were stolen and considers them to be copyrighted and a trade secret. Among other materials, the affidavit contains 61 pages of the allegedly trade-secret and copyrighted story of Xenu.

The Fishman Affidavit contains much text from the old versions of the Operating Thetan levels. The versions of OT I to OT VII in the Fishman Affidavit are considered authentic as the church's Religious Technology Center (RTC) brought copyright lawsuits over their release on the Internet. Fishman's description of OT VIII contains what many interpret as the accusation that Jesus was a pedophile. After initially asserting copyright to all the OT level descriptions in the affidavit, RTC amended its claim to remove the OT VIII description, calling it a forgery. Fishman stated that he had obtained his copy of OT VIII from Ofshe, a different source than his copies of the other OT Levels, purchased from a fellow Scientologist.

The Church of Scientology dropped its libel case against Fishman and Geertz in 1994.

An important side aspect of the case was that several high-ranking Scientology officials and lead attorneys for the organization and former high-ranking Scientologists submitted declarations on their activities for the Church of Scientology, giving thereby insight into the internal ongoings of the Scientology management.

Among others, declarations were submitted by:

- Richard Aznaran & Vicki Aznaran, former executives of the Religious Technology Center
- Jonathan Epstein, at that time International Finance Director of the Church of Scientology International
- Guillaume Lesevre, at that time Executive Director International of the Church of Scientology International
- David Miscavige, Chairman of the Board of the Religious Technology Center
- Raymond Mithoff, at that time Senior Case Supervisor International of the Church of Scientology International
- Thomas Spring, tax attorney for the Church of Scientology International
- Norman Starkey, at that time executive director of Author Services Inc.
- André Tabayoyon, ex-Scientologist and former security official of the Church of Scientology International
- William Walsh, attorney for different organizations of the Church of Scientology
- Marc Yager, at that time Chairman of the Watchdog Committee of the Church of Scientology International
- Monique Yingling, tax attorney for the Church of Scientology International
- Robert Vaughn Young, former spokesperson for the Guardian's Office and Author Services Inc.
- Stacy Brooks Young, former official of the U.S. Office of Special Affairs

== Posting to the Internet ==
Although the Church of Scientology attempted to prevent others from receiving the document by continuously borrowing it, the text of this declaration and its exhibits were scanned, converted to text, and posted onto the Usenet newsgroup alt.religion.scientology by ex-Scientologist Arnie Lerma. The material was then placed on the World Wide Web by David S. Touretzky.

Lerma's newsgroup posting resulted in the August 1995 raid of his home for copyright violation on the materials, and the resulting lawsuit Religious Technology Center (Scientology) vs Arnaldo Lerma, Richard Leiby, and The Washington Post. U.S. Federal Judge Leonie Brinkema ruled that while Richard Leiby and the Washington Post had not violated copyright, Lerma was liable and fined $2,500 but with no costs awarded to Scientology. Judge Brinkema also stated that the primary motivation for the case was "to stifle criticism of Scientology in general and to harass its critics."

After being posted to the newsgroup, the documents were mirrored on hundreds of websites worldwide. The Church of Scientology responded by suing a number of people and their Internet service providers for copyright infringement. The defendants responded by challenging the church to prove it was actually the copyright holder of the disputed documents.

The other notable case in connection with this was against Dutch writer Karin Spaink. The Church brought suit on copyright violation grounds for reproducing the source material, and claimed rewordings would reveal a trade secret. In 2003, Spaink won the case, with the court holding that her quotation of Scientology works was acceptable and expressing concern about Scientology's attempts to prevent discussion of its doctrines. The Church appealed but dropped the case after a negative advice on the appeal from the Attorney-General to the court in March 2005. In December 2005, the court dismissed the appeal, making the previous ruling final. The Church has no further possibility for appeal due to their dropping the case. The ruling also reversed earlier decisions affecting hyperlinking.

Critics of the church have accused it of intentionally using lawsuits in these and other cases as SLAPP suits, intended to silence their opposition. Critics of Steven Fishman have produced the affidavit of Kenneth D. Long, a Scientology executive, which states that Fishman received services from a Scientology mission, did a few introductory courses, never worked for the Church or CCHR, and did not get any auditing or do any courses at the main Miami church, which would conflict with his claims. Vicki Aznaran, a former Scientologist who was involved in anti-Scientology litigation before retracting her claims as part of a settlement with Scientology, gave a declaration through Scientology attorneys in which she states various allegations made by Steven Fishman and other church critics are untrue, contradicting her previous declaration given in CSI v. Fishman and Geertz.

== Fishman's relationship to the Church of Scientology ==
A great deal of controversy with regards to Fishman's involvement with the Church of Scientology has arisen in the decades following the case. Initially, the allegations questioning Fishman's involvement came solely from the Church itself and their legal team, who pursued the libel suit recognizing that he was not in their records. In 2015, notable Scientology critic Tony Ortega published an exposé on the affair; in which he characterizes Fishman as a “squirrel” or Independent Scientologist. He describes Fishman as follows:

“Actual longtime Scientologists will tell you that the material in [Fishman’s] book, as well as Fishman’s statements on his notorious set of videos (recorded by his attorney to prove to the court that Fishman was a lunatic) prove that Fishman was never a Scientologist, but a nutcase who had amassed a huge library of Scientology materials which he studied closely so he could talk as though he knew what he was talking about — at least to the uninitiated.”

— Tony Ortega, Why Steve Fishman — of the notorious Fishman Papers — is today serving 21 years in prison

In addition to there being no listed Scientology completions for Steven Fishman ever published, many now ex-Scientologists mentioned in his book, Lonesome Squirrel, have categorically refuted the events of the book mentioning them, and denied having known him altogether. Fishman has long asserted that he received OT levels I-VII and VIII respectively from two Sea Org members. Although Ortega professes skepticism regarding this, he states he believes the document to be authentic nonetheless.

As we began reading “Lonesome Squirrel,” we realized that some of the people named in it have, 20 years later, come out of the church. So we reached out to them and they confirmed for us that nothing in the book associated with them actually happened. “Lonesome Squirrel” is an incredibly creative work of fiction that has enough actual names and locations and quotations from L. Ron Hubbard’s work that it has a veneer of authenticity.

— Tony Ortega, Why Steve Fishman — of the notorious Fishman Papers — is today serving 21 years in prison

== See also ==
- Andre Tabayoyon—Affidavit referenced in the case, in United States District Court.
- Scientology and the Internet
- Scientology and the legal system
- Scientology and the occult
- Streisand effect
