= Scientology controversies =

Since its inception in 1954, the Church of Scientology has been involved in a number of controversies, including its stance on psychiatry, Scientology's legitimacy as a religion, the Church's (Note: Use of "Church" or "the Church" is a common shortened form of "Church of Scientology"; see The Church (Scientology).) aggressive attitude in dealing with its perceived enemies and critics, allegations of mistreatment of members, and predatory financial practices; for example, the high cost of religious training^{:191} and perceived exploitative practices. When mainstream media outlets have reported alleged abuses, representatives of the Church have tended to deny such allegations.

== Secrecy ==
The Church of Scientology maintains strict control over the use of its symbols, names and religious texts. Although U.S. intellectual property law allows for "fair use" of material for commentary, parody, educational purposes, etc., critics of the Church such as Gerry Armstrong have argued the Church unfairly and illegally uses the legal system to suppress "fair" uses, including suppressing any mention of the space opera aspects of the religion, including the story of Xenu.^{:371-383}

One example critics cited is a 1995 lawsuit against the Washington Post. The Religious Technology Center (RTC), the corporation controlling L. Ron Hubbard's copyrighted materials, sued to prevent a Post reporter from describing church teachings at the center of another lawsuit, claiming copyright infringement, trade secret misappropriation, and the circulation of their "advanced technology" teachings would cause "devastating, cataclysmic spiritual harm" to those not prepared. In her judgment in favor of the Post, Judge Leonie Brinkema noted:

When the RTC first approached the Court with its ex parte request for the seizure warrant and Temporary Restraining Order, the dispute was presented as a straight-forward one under copyright and trade secret law. However, the Court is now convinced that the primary motivation of RTC in suing Lerma, DGS and the Post is to stifle criticism of Scientology in general and to harass its critics. As the increasingly vitriolic rhetoric of its briefs and oral argument now demonstrates, the RTC appears far more concerned about criticism of Scientology than vindication of its secrets.

— U.S. District Judge Leonie Brinkema, Religious Technology Center v. Arnaldo Lerma, Washington Post, Mark Fisher, and Richard Leiby, 29 November 1995

== Public absence of Shelly Miscavige ==
Shelly Miscavige, wife of Church of Scientology leader David Miscavige, has not been seen publicly since 2007.

In 2013, actress Leah Remini, a former Scientologist and vocal critic of the organization, filed a missing person report with the Los Angeles Police Department (LAPD) concerned about her disappearance. The LAPD allegedly contacted Miscavige and closed the case within hours. Despite assurances from Church of Scientology spokespeople that Shelly Miscavige is alive and well, many continue to express skepticism.

In 2022, after hearing about an investigation into now-retired LAPD Captain Cory Palka about alerting others of confidential police investigations, Remini revealed photographs of Palka accepting a $20,000 check from Scientology for LAPD charities, and one of a Scientology information kiosk located in the LAPD Hollywood Division. While speaking with Palka in his office, Remini noticed a letter of thanks to him from Scientology with an invitation to lunch at their Celebrity Centre.

As of 2026, Shelly Miscavige's whereabouts remain unknown.

== Scientology and psychiatry ==
There have been a number of controversies between Scientology and psychiatry since the founding of the Church of Scientology in 1952. Scientology is publicly, and often vehemently, opposed to both psychiatry and psychology. Scientologists view psychiatry as a barbaric and corrupt profession and encourage alternative care based on spiritual healing. According to the Church of Scientology, psychiatry has a long history of improper and abusive care. The group's views have been disputed, criticized and condemned by experts in the medical and scientific community and been a source of public controversy.

The Church of Scientology's objection to secular ideas about mental health are religious in nature, based on the conviction that humans are essentially divine beings who have been marred by negative experiences acquired over several lifetimes. Scientology also purports that the secular perception of what is mentally normal is not based on science, a contradiction to the claims of psychiatry and psychology.

The Church founded an anti-psychiatry organization called Citizens Commission on Human Rights (CCHR), which operates a public exhibit in Los Angeles, California, called Psychiatry: An Industry of Death.

== "Attack the Attacker" policy ==
Scientology has a reputation for hostile action toward anyone who criticizes it in a public forum; executives within the organization have proclaimed Scientology is "not a turn-the-other-cheek religion". Journalists, politicians, former Scientologists and various anti-cult groups have made accusations of wrongdoing against Scientology since the 1960s, and Scientology has targeted these critics—almost without exception—for retaliation, in the form of lawsuits and public counter-accusations of personal wrongdoing. Many of Scientology's critics have also reported they were subjected to threats and harassment in their private lives.

The organization's actions reflect a formal policy for dealing with criticism instituted by L. Ron Hubbard, called "attack the attacker". Hubbard codified this policy in the latter half of the 1960s in response to government investigations into the organization. In 1966, Hubbard wrote a criticism of the organization's behavior and noted the "correct procedure" for attacking enemies of Scientology:

(1) Spot who is attacking us.

(2) Start investigating them promptly for felonies or worse using own professionals, not outside agencies.

(3) Double curve our reply by saying we welcome an investigation of them.

(4) Start feeding lurid, blood, sex, crime actual evidence on the attackers to the press.

Don't ever tamely submit to an investigation of us. Make it rough, rough on attackers all the way. You can get "reasonable about it" and lose. Sure we break no laws. Sure we have nothing to hide. BUT attackers are simply an anti-Scientology propaganda agency so far as we are concerned. They have proven they want no facts and will only lie no matter what they discover. So BANISH all ideas that any fair hearing is intended and start our attack with their first breath. Never wait. Never talk about us—only them. Use their blood, sex, crime to get headlines. Don't use us. I speak from 15 years of experience in this. There has never yet been an attacker who was not reeking with crime. All we had to do was look for it and murder would come out.

— L. Ron Hubbard, Attacks on Scientology, 1966

=== Litigation against critics ===
The purpose of the suit is to harass and discourage rather than to win.

The law can be used very easily to harass, and enough harassment on somebody who is simply on the thin edge anyway, well knowing that he is not authorized, will generally be sufficient to cause his professional decease. If possible, of course, ruin him utterly.

— L. Ron Hubbard, A Manual on the Dissemination of Material, 1955

In the past, many critics of Scientology have claimed they were harassed by frivolous and vexatious lawsuits, including journalists Paulette Cooper and Richard Behar; free-speech advocates Karin Spaink, David S. Touretzky, Keith Henson and Grady Ward; and former Scientology members Cyril Vosper, Lawrence Wollersheim, Jon Atack, Gerry Armstrong, Steven Fishman, Dennis Erlich, Arnie Lerma, and Bonnie Woods.

Paulette Cooper was falsely accused of felony charges as she had been framed by the Church of Scientology's Guardian's Office. Furthermore, her personal life had been intruded upon by Scientologists who had attempted to kill her and/or draw her to suicide in a covert plan known as Operation Freakout brought to light after FBI investigations into other matters (See Operation Snow White).

In 1991, Time published a highly critical cover story on Scientology, The Thriving Cult of Greed and Power, by Richard Behar. The Church of Scientology responded with an extensive publicity campaign disputing the article, twelve-weeks of advertisements in USA Today and other publicity, and then filed a $416 million libel suit against Time Warner and Behar, Church of Scientology International v. Time Warner, Inc., et al.. The suit was dismissed in 1996, and the dismissal was upheld on appeal in 2001, when the U.S. Supreme Court declined to hear the case.

Gareth Alan Cales was harassed by the Church of Scientology, including false charges against him and his friends.

Similarly, the Church of Scientology's legal battle with Gerry Armstrong in Church of Scientology v. Gerald Armstrong spanned two decades and involved a $10 million claim against Armstrong.

=== Scientology and Me ===
In 2007 a BBC documentary on Scientology by reporter John Sweeney came under scrutiny by Scientologists. Sweeney alleged "While making our BBC Panorama film Scientology and Me I have been shouted at, spied on, had my hotel invaded at midnight, denounced as a 'bigot' by star Scientologists, brain-washed—that is how it felt to me—in a mock up of a Nazi-style torture chamber and chased round the streets of Los Angeles by sinister strangers". This resulted in a video being distributed by Scientologists of a shouting match between Sweeney and Scientology spokesman Tommy Davis. The Church has reportedly released a DVD accusing the BBC of organising a demonstration outside a Scientology office in London, during which "terrorist death threats" were made against Scientologists. The BBC described the allegations as "clearly laughable and utter nonsense". Sandy Smith, the BBC programme's producer, commented the Church of Scientology has "no way of dealing with any kind of criticism at all".

=== Fair Game ===
Hubbard detailed his rules for attacking critics in a number of policy letters, including one often quoted by critics as "the fair game policy". This allowed those who had been declared enemies of the Church, called "suppressive persons" (SPs), "May be deprived of property or injured by any means...May be tricked, sued or lied to or destroyed". (taken from HCOPL October 18, 1967 Issue IV, Penalties for Lower Conditions)

The aforementioned policy was canceled and replaced by HCOPL July 21, 1968, Penalties for Lower Conditions. The wordings "May be deprived of property or injured by any means... May be tricked, sued or lied to or destroyed", are not found in this reference. Scientology critics argue only the term but not the practice was removed. To support this contention, they refer to "HCO Policy Letter of October 21, 1968" which says, "The practice of declaring people FAIR GAME will cease. FAIR GAME may not appear on any Ethics Order. It causes bad public relations. This P/L does not cancel any policy on the treatment or handling of a SP."

According to a book by Omar Garrison, HCOPL March 7, 1969, was created under pressure from the government of New Zealand. Garrison quotes from the HCOPL, "We are going in the direction of mild ethics and involvement with the Society". Garrison then states, "It was partly on the basis of these policy reforms that the New Zealand Commission of Inquiry recommended that no legislative action be taken against Scientology". The source of Omar Garrison for this is most likely the Dumbleton-Powles Report, additional data and quotations are found in this report.

In 1977, top officials of Scientology's "Guardian's Office", an internal security force run by Hubbard's wife, Mary Sue Hubbard, admitted that fair game was policy in the GO. (U.S. v. Kember, Budlong Sentencing Memorandum – Undated, 1981).

In separate cases in 1979 and 1984, attorneys for Scientology argued the Fair Game policy was in fact a core belief of Scientology and as such deserved protection as religious expression.

=== Dead agenting ===
Dead agenting means to provide negative information or propaganda about an enemy or critic. A dead agent pack or package is a compilation of documents designed to defame or ruin the reputation of an opponent. It is used to discredit someone who has spoken out against Scientology, or is held as "insurance" to deter someone from speaking out.

In the 1970s, Hubbard continued to codify the policy of "attacking the attacker" and assigned a term to be used frequently within Scientology: "dead agenting". Used as a verb, "dead agenting" is described by Hubbard as a technique for countering negative accusations against Scientology by diverting the critical statements and making counter-accusations against the accuser; in other words, to "attack the attacker". Hubbard defined the PR (public relations) policy on "dead agenting" in a 1974 bulletin:

The technique of proving utterances false is called "DEAD AGENTING." It's in the first book of Chinese espionage. When the enemy agent gives false data, those who believed him but now find it false kill him—or at least cease to believe him. So the PR slang for it is 'Dead Agenting.'

— L. Ron Hubbard, Handling Hostile Contacts/Dead Agenting, 1974

The phrase comes from a misunderstanding of the chapter on espionage in The Art of War.

The now-defunct Scientology-sponsored website Religious Freedom Watch was often cited by alt.religion.scientology users as a contemporary example of "dead agenting". It contained false discreditable information about critics of the Church. According to the New York Press, the website was "almost universally regarded as a Scientology front group designed to attack the Church's critics." After one person pressured NYP to check the website for information on a particular person, NYP was unable to verify the information with any credible source.

Dead agenting has also been carried out by flier campaigns against some critics—using so-called "DA fliers". Bonnie Woods, an ex-member who began counseling people involved with Scientology and their families, became a target along with her husband in 1993 when the Church of Scientology started a leaflet operation denouncing her as a "hate campaigner" with demonstrators outside their home and around East Grinstead. After a long battle of libel suits, in 1999, the Church agreed to issue an apology and to pay £55,000 damages and £100,000 in legal costs to the Woods.

=== R2-45 ===
"R2-45" is the name given by L. Ron Hubbard to what he described as "an enormously effective process for exteriorization but its use is frowned upon by this society at this time". In Scientology doctrine, exteriorization refers to the separation of the thetan (soul) from the body. According to the author Stewart Lamont, Hubbard defined R2-45 as a process by which exteriorization could be produced by shooting a person in the head with a .45 revolver.

While no "R2-45 letters" have been published, orders to use R2-45 on specific individuals were published in a monthly magazine for Scientologists. On March 6, 1968, Hubbard issued an internal memo titled "RACKET EXPOSED", in which he denounced twelve people as "Enemies of mankind, the planet and all life", and ordered that "Any Sea Org member contacting any of them is to use Auditing Process R2-45." The memo was subsequently reproduced, with another name added, in the Church of Scientology's monthly journal, The Auditor. Another four people were named in a second R2-45 order published in The Auditor later in 1968.

== Criminal convictions of executives ==
Much of the controversy surrounding Scientology is reflected in the long list of legal incidents associated with the organization including the criminal convictions of core members of the Scientology organization.

In 1978, a number of Scientologists, including L. Ron Hubbard's wife Mary Sue Hubbard (who was second in command in the organization at the time), were convicted of perpetrating what was at the time the largest incident of domestic espionage in the history of the United States, called "Operation Snow White". This involved infiltrating, wiretapping, and stealing documents from the offices of Federal attorneys and the Internal Revenue Service. The judge who convicted Mary Sue Hubbard and ten accomplices described their attempt to plead freedom of religion in defense:

It is interesting to note that the founder of their organization, unindicted co-conspirator L. Ron Hubbard, wrote in his dictionary entitled Modern Management Technology Defined...that 'truth is what is true for you.' Thus, with the founder's blessings they could wantonly commit perjury as long as it was in the interest of Scientology. The defendants rewarded criminal activities that ended in success and sternly rebuked those that failed. The standards of human conduct embodied in such practices represent no less than the absolute perversion of any known ethical value system.

In view of this, it defies the imagination that these defendants have the unmitigated audacity to seek to defend their actions in the name of religion. That these defendants now attempt to hide behind the sacred principles of freedom of religion, freedom of speech, and the right to privacy—which principles they repeatedly demonstrated a willingness to violate with impunity—adds insult to the injuries which they have inflicted on every element of society.

— Judge Richey

Eleven church staff members, including Mary Sue Hubbard and other highly placed officials, pleaded guilty or were convicted in federal court based on evidence seized in the raids and received sentences from two to six years (some suspended).

Other noteworthy incidents involving criminal accusations and prosecutions against the Church of Scientology include:

- On January 4, 1963, more than one hundred E-meters were seized by U.S. marshals at the Founding Church of Scientology building, now known as the L. Ron Hubbard House, located in Washington, D.C. The Church was accused of making false claims that the devices effectively treated some 70 percent of all physical and mental illness. The FDA also charged that the devices did not bear adequate directions for treating the conditions for which they were recommended. Upon appeal, the E-meters were returned, with the direction that they should be used only in "bona fide religious counseling", and that all meters and referring literature must include a label disclaiming any medical benefits. In the decision, the court gave recognition to Scientology's "constitutional right to protection from the government's excessive entanglement with religion" as written by James R. Lewis, in Scientology.
- In 1978, L. Ron Hubbard was convicted in absentia by French authorities of engaging in fraud, fined 35,000 francs, and sentenced to four years in prison. The head of the French Church of Scientology was convicted at the same trial and given a suspended one-year prison sentence.
- The FBI raid on the Church's headquarters revealed documentation that detailed Scientology actions against various critics of the organization. Among these documents was a plan to frame Gabe Cazares, the mayor of Clearwater, Florida, with a staged hit-and-run accident. Also, plans were made to discredit the skeptical organization CSICOP by spreading rumors that it was a front for the CIA, and a project called "Operation Freakout" which aimed at ruining the life of Paulette Cooper, author of The Scandal of Scientology, an early book that had been critical of the movement.
- In 1988, the government of Spain arrested Scientology president Heber Jentzsch and ten other members of the organization on various charges including illicit association, coercion, fraud, and labor law violations. Jentzsch jumped bail, leaving Spain and returning to the United States after Scientology paid a bail bond of approximately $1 million, and he has not returned to the country since. Scientology fought the charges in court for fourteen years, until the case was finally dismissed in 2002.
- The Church of Scientology is the only religious organization in Canada to be convicted on the charge of breaching the public trust: The Queen v. Church of Scientology of Toronto, et al. (1992)
- In France, several officials of the Church of Scientology were convicted of embezzlement in 2001. The Church was listed as a "dangerous cult" in a parliamentary report. In May 2009, a trial commenced in France against Scientology, accusing it of organised fraud. The case focused on a complaint by a woman who says that after being offered a free personality test, she was pressured into paying large sums of money. The Church is regarded as a sect in France. The result of the trial was that two branches of the organization and several of its leaders have been found guilty of fraud and fined. Alain Rosenberg, the group's head in France, received a two-year suspended jail sentence.
- The Church of Scientology long considered the Cult Awareness Network (CAN) as one of its most important enemies, and many Scientology publications during the 1980s and 1990s cast CAN (and its spokesperson at the time, Cynthia Kisser) in an unfriendly light, accusing the cult-watchdog organization of various criminal activities. After CAN was forced into bankruptcy and taken over by Scientologists in the late 1990s, Scientology proudly proclaimed this as one of its greatest victories.
- In Belgium, after a judicial investigation since 1997, a trial against the organization was due to begin in 2008. Charges include formation of a criminal organization, the unlawful exercise of medicine, and fraud.
- In the United Kingdom the Church has been accused of "grooming" City of London Police officers with gifts worth thousands of pounds.
- In Australia, Scientology has been temporarily banned in the 1960s in three out of six states; the use of the E-meter was similarly banned in Victoria. In Victoria, Scientology was investigated by the state government. In the conclusion to his report written as part of this investigation, Kevin Victor Anderson, Q.C. stated "Scientology is a delusional belief system, based on fiction and fallacies and propagated by falsehood and deception". The report was later overturned by the High Court of Australia, which compelled the states to recognize Scientology as a religion for purposes of payroll taxes, (Note: From paragraph 21, per Wilson & Deane JJ: "The conclusion to which we have ultimately come is that Scientology is, for relevant purposes, a religion) stating "Regardless of whether the members of [the Scientology organization] are gullible or misled or whether the practices of Scientology are harmful or objectionable, the evidence, in our view, establishes that Scientology must, for relevant purposes, be accepted as 'a religion' in Victoria."
- In 2009, a Paris court found the French Church of Scientology guilty of organized fraud and imposed a fine of nearly US$900,000. The prosecution had asked for the Church to be banned, but a recent change in legislation made this impossible. The case had been brought by two ex-members who said they had been pressured into spending large amounts of money on Scientology courses and other services. Commenting on the verdict, the plaintiffs' attorney said, "It's the first time in France that the entity of the Church of Scientology is condemned for fraud as an organized gang". A Scientology spokesperson likened the judgment to "an Inquisition for modern times" and said the Church would appeal.

== Mistreatment of members ==
In 2007, a 25-year-old woman from Sydney was charged with murdering her father and sister and seriously injuring her mother. Her parents had prevented her from seeking the psychiatric treatment she needed because of their Scientology beliefs.

In 2012, Debbie Cook, who ran the "spiritual Mecca" for seventeen years, came forward and accused the Church of repeated accounts of "screaming, slapping" and being "made to stand in a trash and water's poured over you" in efforts to confess her sins. This was all done in "The Hole", located at Scientology's International base in Hemet, California. She claims that she was taken there against her will and forced to stay for seven weeks. The Church states that she "voluntarily" participated in their program of "religious discipline".

Leah Remini: Scientology and the Aftermath is a 2016–2019 A&E documentary series that investigated abuses of the Church of Scientology by interviewing former members.

=== Views on homosexuality ===
The Church of Scientology's perspectives on homosexuality and its treatment of LGBTQ members have received criticism from the public and former members. The Church's teachings are based on the writings of its founder, and his statements about homosexuality have led critics to assert that Scientology promotes homophobia, and that it mistreats gay members. Some critics have stated that the Church tried to change their gay attractions.

=== Death of Lisa McPherson ===
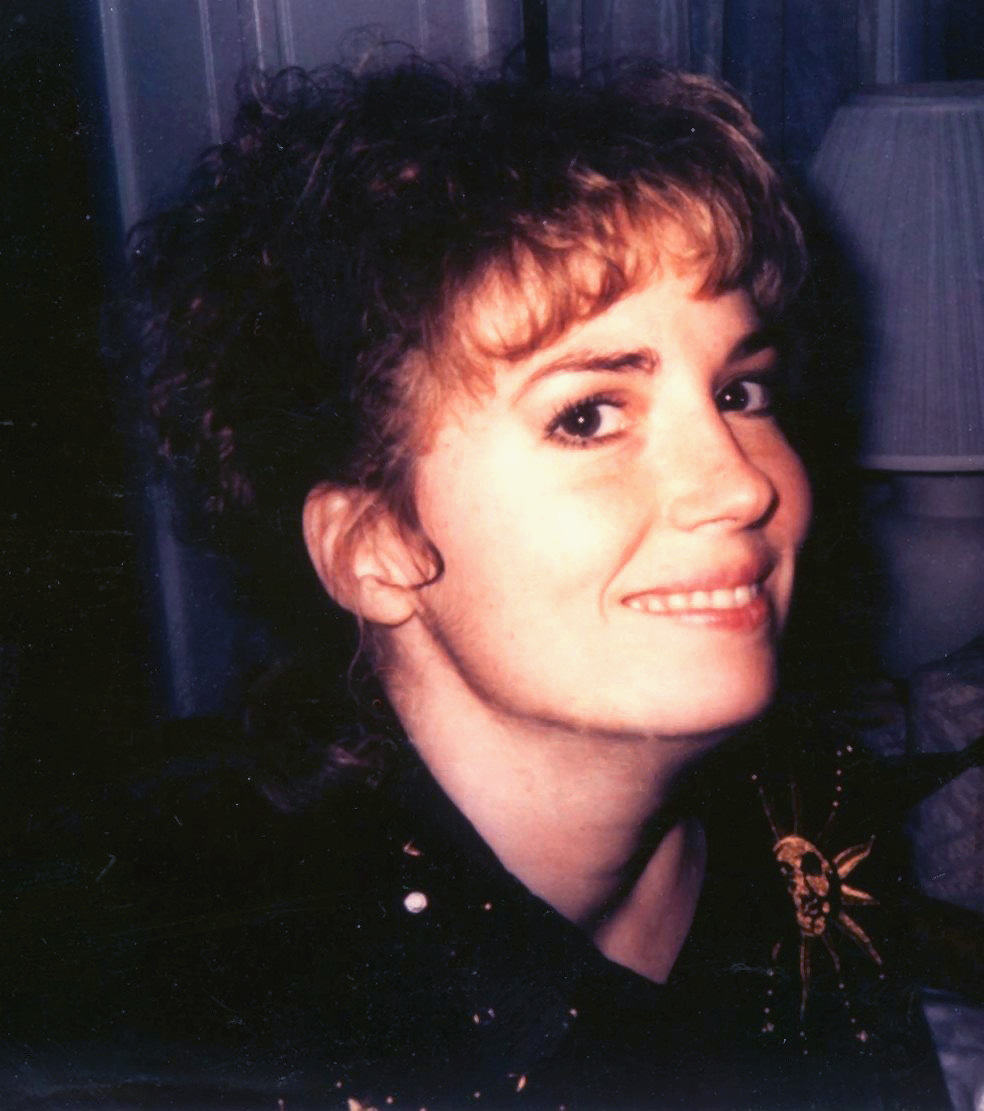
Lisa McPherson

The most widely publicized death of one of the organization's members was that of 36-year-old Lisa McPherson while in the care of Scientologists at the Scientology-owned Fort Harrison Hotel, in Clearwater, Florida, in 1995. McPherson, at the time, was displaying symptoms suggesting she was struggling with mental illness; in one case, she removed all of her clothes after being involved in a minor traffic accident, later remarking she had done so in hopes of obtaining counseling. The Church, however, intervened to prevent McPherson from receiving psychiatric treatment and to keep her in Church custody. Records show that she was then placed in a Scientology program, the Introspection Rundown, which was forced isolation used to handle a psychotic episode. Weeks later, she was pronounced dead on arrival at a hospital. The autopsy identified multiple hematomas (bruises), an abrasion on the nose, and lesions that were consistent with "insect/animal bites". An autopsy showed that she had died of a pulmonary embolism.

Florida authorities filed criminal charges against the Church of Scientology, who denied any responsibility for McPherson's death and vigorously contested the charges. The prosecuting attorneys ultimately dropped the criminal case. After four years, a $100 million civil lawsuit filed by Lisa McPherson's family was settled in 2004. The suit resulted in an injunction against the distribution of a film critical of Scientology, The Profit, which the Church claimed was meant to influence the jury. The terms of the settlement were sealed by the court.

=== Death of Elli Perkins ===
Another crime that received substantial news coverage involved the death of Elli Perkins. This included an installment on the CBS investigative news program 48 Hours.

Perkins was a mother of two, a professional glass artist, and a Scientologist who lived in Western New York. She was a senior auditor at the Church of Scientology in Buffalo, New York. When her then 24-year-old son Jeremy began to show strange and disturbing behavior, Elli did not seek out psychiatric care but used treatment in accordance with Scientology. Scientologists believe that psychiatry "doesn't work."

First, the family sent Jeremy to Scientology's Sea Org in California. He returned home some months later because Sea Org had not helped. Found trespassing outside the University at Buffalo on August 14, 2001, Jeremy was arrested and remanded to a local hospital after a court-ordered psychiatric exam confirmed that he had a diagnosis of schizophrenia.

Elli Perkins later convinced the court to release her son into her custody so she could seek alternatives to psychiatry. She also refused any treatment with anti-psychotic medications. Defense attorney John Nuchereno said that Jeremy's condition declined over the summer of 2002. He was no longer able to work in the family business. The Church of Scientology ceased efforts to cure Jeremy and classified him as a Type III "potential trouble source" (psychotic).

In the fall of 2002, the family consulted Dr. Conrad Maulfair, an osteopathic physician and Scientologist. Maulfair concluded that Jeremy needed to be purged of certain chemical toxins in his body. Maulfair said he needed to be "energized" through vitamin therapy.

Jeremy became suspicious of his mother; he thought the vitamins were poisoning him. In February 2003, Elli took Jeremy to see Albert Brown, a self-taught "natural healer". Elli planned to send Jeremy to live with Brown for treatment. He was to leave for Brown's on March 13, 2003, but days beforehand began to act more aggressively. On the 13th, after a shower he retrieved a steak knife and tried to slit his wrists. Unsuccessful, Jeremy found his mother in the kitchen and attacked her as she spoke to a friend on the phone. Autopsy reports showed that Elli Perkins was stabbed 77 times.

Jeremy was charged with second degree murder but found not responsible by reason of mental disease. On January 29, 2004, after NY State Office of Mental Health exams, he was assessed "Dangerously Mentally Ill" and committed to a secure facility. Jeremy is on psychotropic medications, which court psychiatrists state have not cured him, but have stabilized his condition.

In March 2006, an advertisement in LA Weekly blamed the Church of Scientology for Perkins' violent death. The 48 Hours segment on Perkins' death aired on October 28, 2006. Afterward, CBS reported they had received complaints from Scientologists.

=== Death of Noah Lottick ===
Noah Lottick was an American student of Russian studies who died by suicide on May 11, 1990, by jumping from a 10th-floor hotel window, clutching his only remaining money in his hands. After his death, a controversy arose revolving around his parents' concern over his membership in the Church of Scientology.

Noah Lottick had taken Scientology courses, for which he paid US$5,000. Lottick's friends and family remarked that after taking these courses he began to act strangely. They stated to Time magazine that he told them that his Scientologist teachers were telepathic, and that his father's heart attack was purely psychosomatic. His parents said that he visited their home five days before his death, claiming they were spreading "false rumors" about him.

Lottick's suicide was profiled in a Time cover story that was highly critical of Scientology, "The Thriving Cult of Greed and Power", which received the Gerald Loeb Award, and later appeared in Reader's Digest.

Lottick's father, Dr. Edward Lottick, stated that his initial impression of Scientology was that it was similar to Dale Carnegie's techniques. However, after his son's death, his opinion was that the organization is a "school for psychopaths". He blamed Scientology for his son's death, although no direct connection was determined. After Dr. Lottick's remarks were published in the media, the Church of Scientology haggled with him over US$3,000 that Noah had allegedly paid to the Church and not utilized for services. The Church claimed Lottick had intended this to be a donation.

The Church of Scientology sued Richard Behar and Time magazine for $416 million. Dr. and Mrs. Lottick submitted affidavits affirming "the accuracy of each statement in the article", and stating that Dr. Lottick had "concluded that Scientology therapies were manipulations". They said that no Scientology staff members attended the funeral of their son. All counts against Behar and Time were later dismissed. Lottick's father cited his son's suicide as his motivation for researching cults, in his article describing a survey of physicians that he presented to the Pennsylvania State Medical Society.

The Church of Scientology issued a press release denying any responsibility for Lottick's suicide. Spokesperson Mike Rinder was quoted in the St. Petersburg Times as saying that Lottick had an argument with his parents four days before his death. Rinder stated, "I think Ed Lottick should look in the mirror ... I think Ed Lottick made his son's life intolerable."

=== Brainwashing ===
The Church of Scientology is frequently accused by critics of employing brainwashing.

One alleged example of the Church's possible brainwashing tactics is the Rehabilitation Project Force, to which church staff are assigned to work off alleged wrongdoings under conditions that many critics characterize as degrading. Some of these allegations are presented in Stephen Kent's Brainwashing in Scientology's Rehabilitation Project Force (RPF).

L. Ron Hubbard is believed to have authored The Brainwashing Manual.

==== The Anderson Report ====
The final results of the Anderson Report in 1965 declared:

The Board is not concerned to find that the scientology techniques are brainwashing techniques as practiced, so it is understood, in some communist-controlled countries. Scientology techniques are, nevertheless, a kind of brainwashing...The astonishing feature of Scientology is that its techniques and propagation resemble very closely those set out in a book entitled Brain-washing, advertised and sold by the HASI.

=== Disconnection ===
The Church of Scientology has been criticized for their practice of "disconnection" in which Scientologists are directed to sever all contact with family members or friends who criticize the faith. Critics including ex-members and relatives of existing members say that this practice has divided many families. The disconnection policy is considered by critics to be further evidence that the Church is a cult. By making its members entirely dependent upon a social network entirely within the organization, critics assert that Scientologists are kept from exposure to critical perspectives on the Church and are put in a situation that makes it extremely difficult for members to leave the Church, since apostates will be shunned by the Church and have already been cut off from family and friends.

The Church of Scientology acknowledges that its members are strongly discouraged from associating with "enemies of Scientology", and likens the disconnection policy to the practice of shunning in religions such as the Amish. However, there is a consensus of religious scholars who oppose Scientology's practice: "I just think it would be better for all concerned if they just let them go ahead and get out and everyone goes their own way, and not make such a big deal of it, the policy hurts everybody." J. Gordon Melton, Institute for the Study of American Religion, Santa Barbara, California.

"It has to do with feeling threatened because you're not that big. You do everything you can to keep unity in the group." F.K. Flinn, Washington University in St. Louis.

"Some people I've talked to, they just wanted to go on with their lives and they wanted to be in touch with their daughter or son or parent. The shunning was just painful. And I don't know what it was accomplishing. And the very terms they use are scary, aren't they?" Newton Maloney, Fuller Theological Seminary, Pasadena, California.

=== Use of donations and preferential treatment of Scientologist celebrities ===
Andre Tabayoyon, a former Scientologist and Sea Org staffer, testified in a 1994 affidavit that money from not-for-profit Scientology organizations and labor from those organizations (including the Rehabilitation Project Force) had gone to provide special facilities for Scientology celebrities, which were not available to other Scientologists:

A Sea Org staffer...was taken along to do personal cooking for Tom Cruise and [David] Miscavige at the expense of Scientology not for profit religious organizations. This left only 3 cooks at Gold [Base] to cook for 800 people three times a day... apartment cottages were built for the use of John Travolta, Kirstie Alley, Edgar Winter, Priscilla Presley, and other Scientology celebrities who are carefully prevented from finding out the real truth about the Scientology organization ... Miscavige decided to redo the meadow in beautiful flowers; Tens of thousands of dollars were spent on the project so that [Tom] Cruise and [Nicole] Kidman could romp there. However, Miscavige inspected the project and didn't like it. So the whole meadow was plowed up, destroyed, replowed and sown with plain grass.

Tabayoyon's account of the planting of the meadow was supported by another former Scientologist, Maureen Bolstad, who said that a couple of dozen Scientologists including herself were put to work on a rainy night through dawn on the project. "We were told that we needed to plant a field and that it was to help Tom impress Nicole... but for some mysterious reason it wasn't considered acceptable by Mr. Miscavige. So the project was rejected and they redid it".

== Legitimacy of Scientology as a religion ==
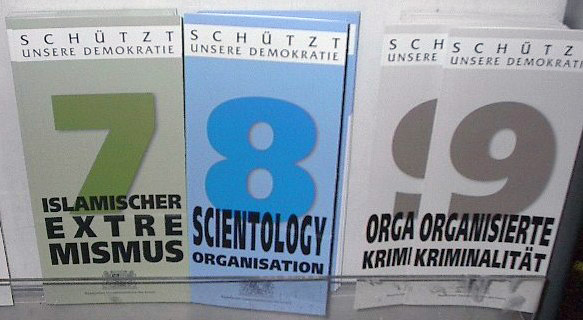
Official German warning leaflets (PDF:) on threats to democracy, including Islamic extremism, Scientology and organized crime

The nature of Scientology is hotly debated in many countries. The Church of Scientology pursues an extensive public relations campaign arguing Scientology is a bona fide religion. The organization cites a number of studies and experts who support their position. Critics point out most cited studies were commissioned by Scientology to produce the desired results.

Many countries (including Belgium, Canada, Finland, France, Germany, Greece, Ireland, Israel, Mexico, Russia, the United Kingdom), while not prohibiting or limiting the activities of the Church of Scientology, have rejected its applications for tax-exempt, charitable status or recognition as a religious organization; it has been variously judged to be a commercial enterprise or a dangerous cult.

Scientology is legally accepted as a religion in the United States and Australia, and enjoys the constitutional protections afforded to religious practice in each country. In October 1993, the U.S. Internal Revenue Service recognized the Church as an "organization operated exclusively for religious and charitable purposes". The Church offers the tax exemption as proof that it is a religion. (This subject is examined in the article on the Church of Scientology).

In 1982, the High Court of Australia ruled the State Government of Victoria lacked the right to declare the Church of Scientology was not a religion. The Court found the issue of belief to be the central feature of religion, regardless of the presence of charlatanism: "Charlatanism is a necessary price of religious freedom, and if a self-proclaimed teacher persuades others to believe in a religion which he propounds, lack of sincerity or integrity on his part is not incompatible with the religious character of the beliefs, practices and observances accepted by his followers."

Other countries that have recognized Scientology as a religion include Spain, Portugal, Italy, Sweden, and New Zealand. The debate continues until today, with a new generation of critics continuing to question Scientology's legitimacy as a religion.

=== L. Ron Hubbard and starting a religion for money ===
While the oft-cited rumor Hubbard made a bar bet with Robert A. Heinlein he could start a cult is unproven, many witnesses have reported that Hubbard said in their presence that starting a religion would be a good way to make money. These statements have led many to believe Hubbard hid his true intentions and was motivated solely by potential financial rewards.

Editor Sam Merwin, for example, recalled a meeting: "I always knew he was exceedingly anxious to hit big money—he used to say he thought the best way to do it would be to start a cult." (December 1946) Writer and publisher Lloyd Arthur Eshbach reported Hubbard saying "I'd like to start a religion. That's where the money is." Writer Theodore Sturgeon reported Hubbard made a similar statement at the Los Angeles Science Fantasy Society. Likewise, writer Sam Moskowitz reported in an affidavit during an Eastern Science Fiction Association meeting on November 11, 1948, Hubbard had said "You don't get rich writing science fiction. If you want to get rich, you start a religion." Milton A. Rothman also reported to his son Tony Rothman he heard Hubbard make exactly that claim at a science fiction convention. In 1998, an A&E documentary titled Inside Scientology shows Lyle Stuart reporting Hubbard stated repeatedly to make money, "you start a religion."

According to The Visual Encyclopedia of Science Fiction, ed. Brian Ash, Harmony Books, 1977:

...[Hubbard] began making statements to the effect that any writer who really wished to make money should stop writing and develop [a] religion, or devise a new psychiatric method. Harlan Ellison's version (Time Out, UK, No 332) is that Hubbard is reputed to have told [John W.] Campbell, "I'm going to invent a religion that's going to make me a fortune. I'm tired of writing for a penny a word". Sam Moskowitz, a chronicler of science fiction, has reported that he himself heard Hubbard make a similar statement, but there is no first-hand evidence.

An article by Professor Benjamin Beit-Hallahmi documents the secular aspects of Scientology from Scientology's own writings.

=== Free Zone suppression ===
The Church has taken steps to suppress the Free Zone, the term for a variety of groups and individuals who practice Scientology outside the strictures of the Church of Scientology proper, and shut down dissenters when possible. The CoS has used copyright and trademark laws to attack various Free Zone groups. Accordingly, the Free Zone avoids the use of officially trademarked Scientology words, including 'Scientology' itself. In 2000, the Religious Technology Center unsuccessfully attempted to gain control over the web domain scientologie.org in a legal action against the Free Zone. Skeptic Magazine described the Free Zone as: "...a group founded by ex-Scientologists to promote L. Ron Hubbard's ideas independent of the COS [Church of Scientology]." A Miami Herald article wrote that ex-Scientologists joined the Free Zone because they felt that Church of Scientology leadership had: "...strayed from Hubbard's original teachings." One Free Zone Scientologist identified as "Safe" was quoted in Salon as saying: "The Church of Scientology does not want its control over its members to be found out by the public and it doesn't want its members to know that they can get scientology outside of the Church of Scientology."

== Personality tests ==
In 2008, Kaja Ballo, the 20-year-old daughter of Olav Gunnar Ballo, a Norwegian member of parliament, took a personality test organized by Scientologists in Nice, and received very negative feedback from it. A few hours later, she committed suicide. French police started an investigation of the Church of Scientology. In the wake of the Ballo suicide linked to the personality test, the spokesman for the Church in Norway called the accusation deeply unfair and pointed out that Ballo had previously suffered eating disorders and psychiatric troubles.

The personality test has been condemned by the psychologist Rudy Myrvang. He called the test a recruitment tool, aimed at breaking down a person so that the Scientologists can build the test-taker back up.

== Treatment of Scientologists in Germany ==
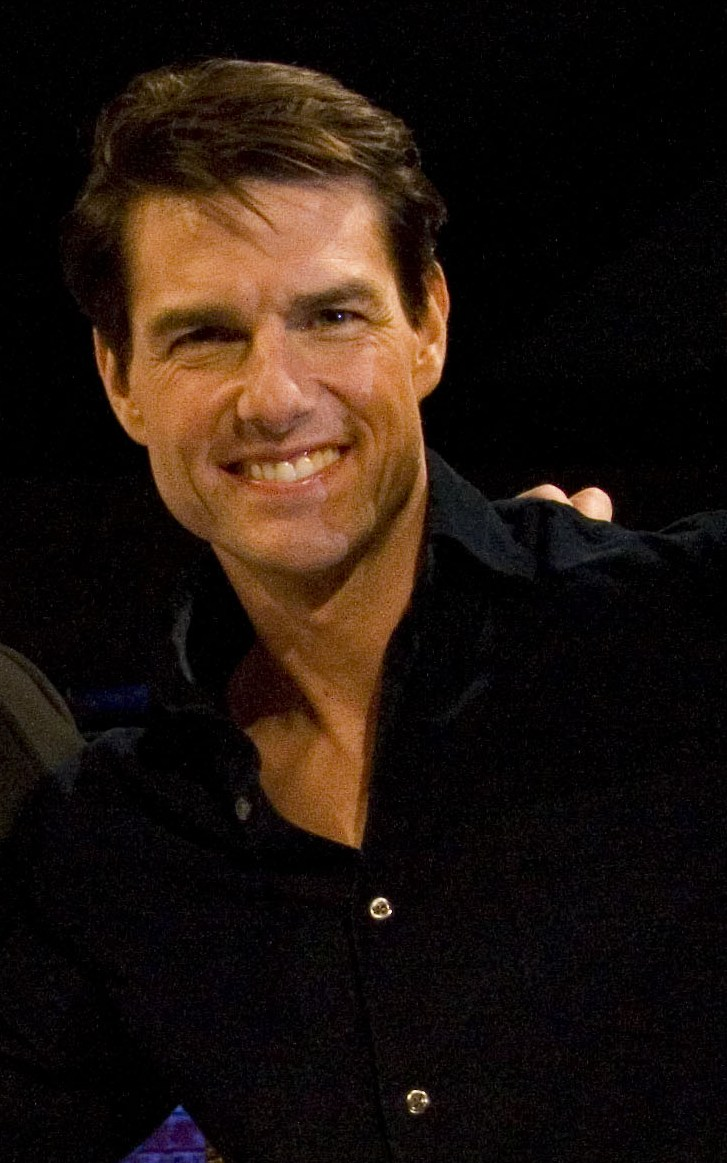
Tom Cruise is one of several Scientologist artists who have been subject to boycott calls in Germany. Pastor Thomas Gandow, a prominent spokesperson for the German Lutheran Church, has described Cruise as the "Goebbels of Scientology".

Based on the 1993 IRS decision granting Scientology tax-exempt status, the U.S. Department of State formally criticized Germany for discriminating against Scientologists and began to note Scientologists' complaints of harassment and discrimination in its annual Human Rights Reports, starting from the 1993 report. Since then, the U.S. Department of State has repeatedly expressed its concerns over the violation of Scientologists' individual rights posed by "sect filters", whereby potential employees are required to divulge any association with Scientology before they are considered for a job. It has also warned that companies and artists associated with Scientology may be subject to "government-approved discrimination and boycotts" in Germany. Past targets of such boycotts have included Tom Cruise and jazz pianist Chick Corea.

In 1997, an open letter to then-German Chancellor Helmut Kohl, published as a newspaper advertisement in the International Herald Tribune, drew parallels between the "organized oppression" of Scientologists in Germany and Nazi policies espoused by Germany in the 1930s. The letter was signed by Dustin Hoffman, Goldie Hawn, and a number of other Hollywood celebrities and executives. Commenting on the matter, a spokesman for the U.S. Department of State criticized Germany's treatment of Scientologists and said that Scientologists were indeed discriminated against in Germany, but condemned any comparisons of this treatment to the Nazis' treatment of Jews as extremely inappropriate, an opinion echoed by the United Nations Special Rapporteur on human rights.

German officials sharply rejected the accusations. They said that Germany guarantees the freedom of religion, but characterized Scientology as a profit-making enterprise, rather than a religion, and emphasized that precisely because of Germany's Nazi past, Germany took a determined stance against all "radical cults and sects, including right-wing Nazi groups", and not just against Scientology. According to a 1997 Time magazine article, most Germans consider Scientology a subversive organization, with pollsters reporting 70% popular support for banning Scientology in Germany.

In late 1997, the United States granted asylum to a German Scientologist, Antje Victore, who claimed she would be subject to religious persecution in her homeland. In 2000, the German Stern magazine published a report asserting that several rejection letters which the woman had submitted as part of her asylum application—ostensibly from potential employers who were rejecting her because she was a Scientologist—had in fact been written by fellow Scientologists at her request and that of the Office of Special Affairs and that she was in personal financial trouble and about to go on trial for tax evasion at the time she applied for asylum. On a 2000 visit to Clearwater, Florida, Ursula Caberta of the Scientology Task Force for the Hamburg Interior Authority likewise alleged that the asylum case had been part of an "orchestrated effort" by Scientology undertaken "for political gain", and "a spectacular abuse of the U.S. system". German expatriate Scientologists resident in Clearwater, in turn, accused Caberta of stoking a "hate campaign" in Germany that had "ruined the lives and fortunes of scores of Scientologists" and maintained that Scientologists had not "exaggerated their plight for political gain in the United States". Mark Rathbun, a top Church of Scientology official, said that although Scientology had not orchestrated the case, "there would have been nothing improper if it had".

== Scientology and Wikipedia ==
In an effort to adhere to Wikipedia policy, the Arbitration Committee of the English Wikipedia decided in late-May 2009 to restrict editing from Church of Scientology IP addresses, to prevent self-serving edits by editors within CoS-administered networks. A "host of anti-Scientologist editors" were topic-banned as well. The committee concluded that both sides had "gamed policy" and resorted to "battlefield tactics", with articles on living persons being the "worst casualties". In 2022, the rule of IP addresses from the Church of Scientology being blocked as if they were open proxies was lifted.

== Church of Scientology's response to criticism ==
Scientology's response to accusations of criminal behavior has been twofold; the Church is under attack by an organized conspiracy, and each of the Church's critics is hiding a private criminal past. In the first instance, the Church of Scientology has repeatedly stated that it is engaged in an ongoing battle against a massive, worldwide conspiracy whose sole purpose is to "destroy the Scientology religion." Thus, aggressive measures and legal actions are the only way the Church has been able to survive in a hostile environment; they sometimes liken themselves to the early Mormons who took up arms and organized militia to defend themselves from persecution.

The Church asserts that the core of the organized anti-Scientology movement is the psychiatric profession, in league with deprogrammers and certain government bodies (including elements within the FBI and the government of Germany.) These conspirators have allegedly attacked Scientology since the earliest days of the Church, with the shared goal of creating a docile, mind-controlled population. As an official Scientology website explains:

To understand the forces ranged against L. Ron Hubbard, in this war he never started, it is necessary to gain a cursory glimpse of the old and venerable science of psychiatry—which was actually none of the aforementioned. As an institution, it dates back to shortly before the turn of the century; it is certainly not worthy of respect by reason of age or dignity; and it does not meet any known definition of a science, what with its hodgepodge of unproven theories that have never produced any result—except an ability to make the unmanageable and mutinous more docile and quiet, and turn the troubled into apathetic souls beyond the point of caring. That it promotes itself as a healing profession is a misrepresentation. Its mission is to control.

— Church of Scientology, 1996

L. Ron Hubbard proclaimed that all critics of Scientology are criminals. Hubbard wrote on numerous occasions that all of Scientology's opponents are seeking to hide their own criminal histories, and the proper course of action to stop these attacks is to "expose" the hidden crimes of the attackers. The Church of Scientology does not deny that it vigorously seeks to "expose" its critics and enemies; it maintains that all of its critics have criminal histories, and they encourage hatred and "bigotry" against Scientology. Hubbard's belief that all critics of Scientology are criminals was summarized in a policy letter written in 1967:

Now get this as a technical fact, not a hopeful idea. Every time we have investigated the background of a critic of Scientology we have found crimes for which that person or group could be imprisoned under existing law. We do not find critics of Scientology who do not have criminal pasts. Over and over we prove this.

— L. Ron Hubbard, Critics of Scientology 1967

Scientology claims that it continues to expand and prosper despite all efforts to prevent it from growing; critics claim that the Church's own statistics contradict its story of continuing growth. Church of Scientology Leader David Miscavige's speeches are directed to insiders in tightly controlled venues, and are noted for hyperbole, itemized lists of accomplishments, overwhelmingly positive proclamations, and esoteric insider language.

The Church of Scientology has published a number of responses to criticism available online.

Analyses of Scientology's counter-accusations and actions against its critics are available on a number of websites, including the critical archive Operation Clambake.

In 2013, attorneys for the Church of Scientology reacted negatively toward the CNN News Group, threatening legal action for its airing of a story covering the release of Lawrence Wright's book, Going Clear: Scientology, Hollywood, and the Prison of Belief. CNN News Group published the correspondence on its web site. The threats were not followed up by lawsuits.

== See also ==
- Bibliography of books critical of Scientology
- Going Clear (film)
- My Scientology Movie (film)
- Scientology and Me (TV documentary)
- Auditing controversies
- Leah Remini: Scientology and the Aftermath (TV series)
- Mike Rinder, former Scientology executive and outspoken critic
- Project Chanology
- Scientology and psychiatry
- Scientology and the Internet
- Scientology and the legal system
- Scientology beliefs and practices
