= OT VIII =

Highest auditing level in Scientology

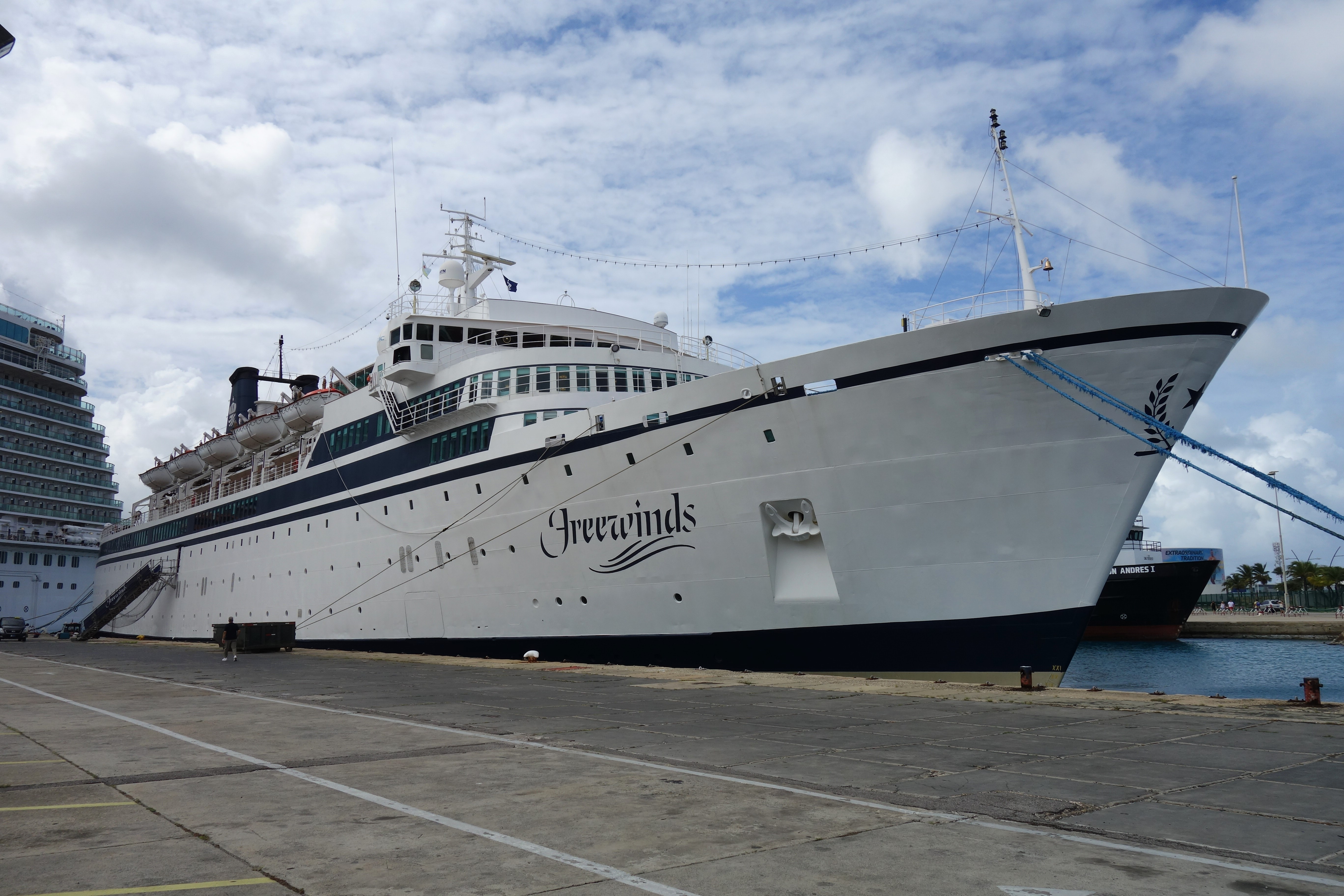
The Freewinds ship is the only place where a Scientologist can acquire the level of OT VIII.

OT VIII or OT 8 (Operating Thetan Level 8) is the highest current auditing level in Scientology. OT VIII is known as "Truth Revealed" and was first released to select high-ranking public Scientologists in 1988, two years after the death of Scientology's founder, L. Ron Hubbard.

OT VIII is only delivered to members of the Church of Scientology in one place—aboard the organization's private cruise ship, the Freewinds. There are a few advanced auditors that are permitted to deliver the level to those who meet the prerequisites.

== Overview ==
The original version authored by Hubbard himself created a furor among Scientologists because of several extraordinary claims Hubbard made that upset early participants. For example, Hubbard had written that he would return from the grave and, in a Messiah-like role, stop an impending apocalyptic alien invasion by the Marcab Confederacy, (Note: Hubbard wrote: "Some eighty-odd million years ago Earth time (it actually dates at 78,395,042 but dates are a bit superfluous with this material) plans were drawn by a group outside the MEST universe for the eventual takeover of a good portion of this universe.") stated that Jesus was "a lover of young boys and men", (Note: Hubbard wrote: "For those of you whose Christian toes I may have stepped on, let me take the opportunity to disabuse you of some lovely myths. For instance, the historic Jesus was not nearly the sainted figure has been made out to be. In addition to being a lover of young boys and men, he was given to uncontrollable bursts of temper and hatred that belied the general message of love, understanding and other typical Marcab PR.") apparently identified himself with the Antichrist, (Note: Hubbard wrote: "My mission could be said to fulfill the Biblical promise represented by this brief anti-Christ period.") warned that someone attempting this auditing level without being prepared may spontaneously combust, (Note: Hubbard wrote: "There is some danger, but with OT VII thoroughly complete It is not nearly so great as the danger witnessed by assorted unfortunates who happened to stumble into this area in their sleep or in moments of reverie or anaten, experiencing an hitherto mysterious phenomenon known as "spontaneous combustion".) and implied that OT VIII was the final OT level Hubbard intended to publish. (Note: Hubbard wrote: "So there you have it. The secret that I have kept close to my chest all these years. Now you too are part of this secret and I no longer have to shoulder the burden alone or live with the possibility of body death before all the data could be released.") The Church of Scientology asserts that the version of OT VIII provided in the Fishman Affidavit is a forgery, but numerous early participants, as well as Mark Rathbun, former Inspector General of the Religious Technology Center (RTC), have confirmed the document is authentic, and its copyright is verifiable at the United States Copyright Office.

The revised version the Church currently uses was not authored by Hubbard, and instructs participants to repeat the same courses in perpetuity, which is the current church policy. All of the above controversial claims made by Hubbard have been removed. Participants of the revised version described the course as having two parts: a preparatory e-meter drill, followed by a review of Scientology: A History of Man, and an examination of previously identified past lives to find out which ones are false. The course includes a claimed affirmation from Hubbard that "now [the participant] knew who he wasn't, and was interested in finding out who he was." The Church of Scientology describes the revised OT VIII as a "Solo-audited level [which] addresses the primary cause of amnesia on the whole track and lets one see the truth of his own existence. This is the first actual OT level and brings about a resurgence of power and native abilities for the being himself."

According to Mike Rinder, the publication of OT VIII was a watershed moment in Scientology's history. The response by early participants who balked at its claims and left the organization as a result resembled the response to OT III when it was released. The church revised it into its current form after apologists were not able to stop the wave of departures it was causing. Its publication also coincided with the arrival of the Internet, which presented new challenges for the church. Vexatious litigation had been effective at preventing publishers from disseminating information critical of Scientology to the public, but the World Wide Web made it possible for individuals to publish information without needing a publisher. That information could then be seen by anyone with internet access. Departures accelerated as a result, and the church responded by increasingly isolating itself from the public. Rinder also stated that this marked the beginning of the policy of disconnection being used punitively as punishment for Scientologists who leave the church. This produced a culture of "captive" Scientologists: members that remain not because they are faithful to the tenets, but because they fear their families being broken up by disconnection if they leave the church.

== Background ==
L. Ron Hubbard died from a stroke on January 24, 1986, the church announced to the media. He had not been seen publicly since May 1980. Several weeks later, his death was announced to parishioners by David Miscavige, who stated that Hubbard had completed all of his research into the OT I-VIII levels, but researching the remaining levels (IX-XV) can only be done "outside the body". Because his body had become an "encumbrance" to continuing his research, Hubbard discarded it and would return to the church after completing his research to deliver the remaining OT levels. According to Mike Rinder, the promise of more OT levels has motivated parishioners to continue retaking the same courses (I-VIII) repeatedly to prepare for the new levels to be revealed when Hubbard returns. The last OT level that Hubbard completed before his death was OT VIII, which was being collated and would be released to select Scientologists starting in the summer of 1988.

Two posthumous biographies were published about Hubbard in 1987: Bare-faced Messiah: The True Story of L. Ron Hubbard by Russell Miller, and L. Ron Hubbard: Madman or Messiah? by L. Ron Hubbard Jr., Hubbard's son. Miller used previously unpublished information about Hubbard for his book, while Hubbard's son relied on his upbringing with Hubbard for his. Both made the same allegation that Scientology was a cult, and that Hubbard had a Messiah complex, with Hubbard Jr. writing that his father had told him that he identified himself with the Antichrist. The church denied these claims. One year later, OT VIII was released, in which Hubbard identified himself as the Antichrist.

== Original version ==
In a posthumous prophecy that was intentionally withheld until after his death, Hubbard claims that 80 million years ago, a group of aliens that exist outside of human spacetime developed a plan to take over the universe by activating an inserted genetic implant that will allow for the enslavement of the universe through telepathic mind control. The implant will be activated during the return of the Marcab Confederacy, which Hubbard declares is "rapidly approaching". All world religions, except for "Original Buddhism", are participating in a conspiracy with the aliens to telepathically enslave "a good portion of this universe". Hubbard claims that the Second Coming described in the Book of Revelation refers to this event. Hubbard portrays his mission as that of fulfilling "the Biblical promise represented by the Antichrist" where an "arch-enemy of Christ" will emerge and stop the confederacies' return. Hubbard then asserts that the Historical Jesus was "a lover of young boys and men"—and claims that "the sainted figure [he] has been made out to be" is due to the R6 Implant. Hubbard then writes, "I will return not as a religious leader but a political one" and "halt a series of events designed to make happy slaves of us all". Hubbard warns that someone attempting this auditing level without being prepared may discover what it means to "spontaneously combust". Hubbard also wrote that, with the release of OT VIII, "all the data is now available", implying that this was the last OT level Hubbard intended to publish. (Note: Hubbard wrote:"By the time you read this I will no longer be occupying the body and identity that you have known as Ron.)

The Church of Scientology sued Steven Fishman for copyright infringement of the OT VIII materials. Since infringement only exists if the document is authentic, their lawsuit unintentionally established the authenticity of the material. They dropped the suit afterwards and claimed they were forgeries. Despite efforts to prevent others from seeing the publicly available court documents, they were eventually posted to the internet by Scientology critic, Arnie Lerma, in August 1995. Church of Scientology lawyers asserted again that the Fishman OT VIII documents posted by Lerma are forgeries, yet they sued to have them taken down during the copyright battle over Lerma's web pages. The Church of Scientology's attorney, Kendrick Moxon, identified the "Antichrist" document as copyrighted material, establishing their authenticity. George White, a public Scientologist who had received OT VIII in the summer of 1988, also asserts the document is authentic (and states that the course cost him US$28,000 at the time). Frank Oliver, a former operative with Scientology's Office of Special Affairs, reports having discovered the document in the church's archives. Lawrence Wollersheim, a notable defector, claims they are genuine: "Two sets of defectors, at different times in different parts of the world, came out with those documents", he says. "I've been working with defectors for fifteen years. I have never dealt with anyone as afraid of having their identity revealed as the people who came out and verified those documents."

== Revised version ==
On March 24, 2008, WikiLeaks obtained and placed the complete set of OT levels on their site, including the current "revised" version of OT VIII not previously publicly available. The Church of Scientology again verified the authenticity of these documents when they threatened legal action for copyright infringement if they were not removed. WikiLeaks refused, thus making all 612 pages of the OT materials that many Scientologists spent hundreds of thousands of dollars to see through the church available for free. The year prior, the church launched "The Basics" program to sell "revised" versions of Hubbard's books to parishioners, which were identical to the originals except for changes in punctuation. Parishioners were encouraged to purchase the same books repeatedly, which resembles how the church encouraged retaking the same OT courses before WikiLeaks made the OT materials available for free.

Jesse Prince, former second-in-command of Scientology's RTC, wrote that OT VIII was revised after early participants were "horribly upset" by the content. The OT VIII section has two parts: "original" and "new". The original section is identical to the Fishman version, while the subsequent "New" section is completely redacted and virtually unrecognizable when compared to the original that Fishman produced.

The revised version is dated 1991, which is three years after the initial rollout of OT VIII, and states that "It is not the original nor is it a perfect record", and claims that "any differences are extremely minor (if at all)." The author writes, "What is presented here are reconstructions of those materials by people who have trained and delivered them before leaving that organization. If the original materials should become available at a future date, a revision of this volume will done to include them." The document also includes a legal disclaimer that reads, "In the absence of the original materials, the following are presented on an 'as is' basis and are used at your own discretion. No warranty is conferred or implied."

The author of the revised edition is not identified but, since it was written five years after his death, the current edition of OT VIII could not have been authored by L. Ron Hubbard.

The author states that the purpose of this auditing level is to learn the secret of the relationship between "the Supreme Being" and the Thetan. Both are infinite, but the Thetan is unable to perceive its infinite identity due to confusions and distortions caused by MEST (matter, energy, space, time). The purpose of this OT level is to remove those impediments and, thus, know one's identity from origin to infinity. The author states that anyone who is not "flat" on the previous OT levels should continue to retake them (presumably at full price) until they are. The author also states that this information is to remain confidential from "squirrels" or scientologists not in the church.
