= Scientologie, Wissenschaft von der Beschaffenheit und der Tauglichkeit des Wissens =

Book by Anastasius Nordenholz

- Author: Anastasius Nordenholz
- Language: German, English
- Subject: philosophy of science, existentialism
- Genre: non-fiction
- Publisher: Ernst Reinhardt publishing house, Munich, Germany
- Publication date: 1934
- Publication place: Germany
- ISBN: 3-9804724-0-X
- OCLC: 75680321

Scientologie, Wissenschaft von der Beschaffenheit und der Tauglichkeit des Wissens (Scientology: Science of the Constitution and Usefulness of Knowledge) is a 1934 book published by Anastasius Nordenholz, in which he defines the term "Scientologie" or "Eidologie" as a science of knowing or knowledge and discusses the philosophical implications of the concept.

The book has been cited by some as a possible source of inspiration for L. Ron Hubbard and his better-known conception of Scientology, though this interpretation is disputed.

== Summary of the book ==
Nordenholz highlights the problem of isolating knowledge as "a particular appearance of the world." He asks:

"What is Knowing? What IS Knowledge? What can we know, what must we know about Knowledge/Knowing, to do justice to and to justify the world? The question is thus nothing less than self-knowing, determination of the nature of self, and also of self-realization and self-understanding of Knowledge/Knowing. Is this possible? If possible, how can the systemization of Knowledge/Knowing itself be accomplished? How can a Science of Knowledge/Knowing be produced?"

After establishing a number of definitions, he concludes that

"the world is nothing but knowledge, merely an extraction from knowing....Only out of the equally valued mutual operation of Knowledge/Knowing as shaper & creator, and world as created & shaped, is it possible to arrive at the true science of the world....Out of this circumstance comes the right of Scientologie to treat the world as belonging to its counterpart, as an appendage of the consciousness."

He goes on to assert that human consciousness can be raised to a position of independence, or isolation, but notes that "The consciousness, which always remains a part and particular creation of the world, is incompetent to create from a nothingness because of this very worldliness. In order for the consciousness to be able to create, it has to first find a fountainhead source out of which it can create, and this Something is a Beingness."

Nordenholz next introduces the concept of a number of axioms and systems which "stand of their own power and dignity, as if they were capable of, but do not need, a verification or confirmation from another source." He defines the structure of Scientologie:

1. In axioms: exposition of the axioms and the axiom systems of consciousness.
2. In systems: erection of the forming or moulding system of the consciousnesses, the comprehension system of the reason, all form the axiom system.
3. In demonstration: justification of the produced comprehension systems and with that, working back to the underlying basis of the axiom systems.
4. In study of the origin, nature, methods, and limits of knowledge: establishment of the Total-system of sciences from the foundation of Scientologie systems of knowledge and comprehension.

Nordenholz held that the most important axiom was the Axiom of Mediation:

"The consciousness, nominated as the creator of the world, presupposes a wellspring, a source, out of which it can scoop; a Being, which somehow and in some measure can be reached thru consciousness, but which exists there by itself BEFORE and independent from the consciousness. The assumption of a creator activity of the consciousness is dependent upon the Standing Orders of self-primordial, free, detached, absolute Beings, the By-Itself-Being(s)."

== Relationship to Scientology ==
George Malko in his 1970 book Scientology: The Now Religion evaluated whether Nordenholz's concept of Scientologie had any connection to Scientology, which was created in the early 1950s by L. Ron Hubbard. Although Malko notes some similarities between the ideas expounded by Nordenholz and Hubbard, he also notes that Hubbard never mentioned Nordenholz even though Hubbard frequently mentioned other writers as influencing his work leading to Scientology. In the end, Malko leaves it up to the reader to decide if Hubbard had "known of the Nordenholz book and borrowed freely".

Roy Wallis in his 1977 book The Road to Total Freedom casts doubt on the perceived similarities, noting that Malko had used an English translation produced in 1968 by a former Scientologist which, he speculated, could have affected the translation. When Wallis commissioned a new translation of several pages, he noted that the similarities between Nordenholz and Hubbard were much less evident. Wallis also noted that he found no evidence that Hubbard could read German.

The Free Zone association of independent scientologists considered the parallels in content sufficiently valid to obtain the copyrights to the Scientologie book from Nordenholz's heirs, and republish it online "in its original context".

== Scientologie.org domain name dispute ==
In 1995, a German Free Zone organization, Freie Zone e.V. (FZ), obtained the copyrights to Nordenholz's book, and registered the domain name scientologie.org to promote the book and its concepts. Religious Technology Center (RTC), which controls the Church of Scientology's trademarks, objected because RTC had registered the mark Scientologie in several countries as early as 1984. (Note: The word "scientologie" is used in French-language countries as the French translation of "scientology".) When the scientologie.org domain was suspended, FZ used scientologie.de instead, while retaining ownership of the disputed scientologie.org. In a 2000 decision by the WIPO Arbitration and Mediation Center, RTC's claim was denied primarily because the domain was intended to promote the book authored decades before any use of the word "scientology" by Scientology's founder L. Ron Hubbard. In fact, the earliest documented usage of the word "scientology" is considered to be by Allen Upward in his 1907 book The New Word.
