= Bonnie Woods =

American critic of Scientology

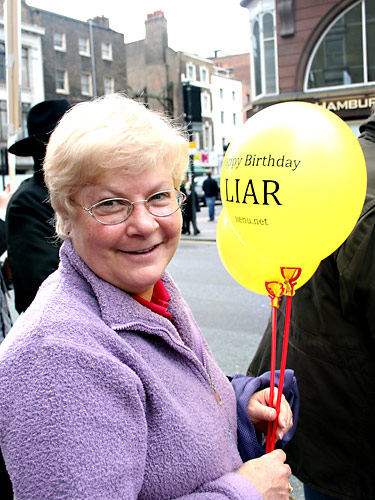
Woods in March 2008

Bonnie Woods is an American former Scientologist and critic of the Church of Scientology based in England. A former member of Scientology's Sea Org, she left in 1982 and later became known for supporting families affected by Scientology through a telephone helpline she ran with her husband. Woods was declared a "suppressive person" by the Church and became the subject of surveillance, picketing, and a leaflet campaign in her local community. She initiated libel proceedings against the Church, which in turn filed multiple suits against her. After six years of litigation (1993–1999), the case reached the High Court of Justice, where in 1999 the Church of Scientology admitted in open court that its allegations about her were false and paid damages and costs.

== Overview ==
An American who moved to England, Woods had been a member of the Sea Organization but left Scientology in 1982. Since 1992, she and her husband Richard have run a telephone helpline for families affected by Scientology. Scientologists declared her a "suppressive person" and picketed her house in East Grinstead, the town where Scientology maintains its British headquarters Saint Hill Manor and where most of the UK's Scientologists live, as well as putting her family under surveillance.

Woods and her family were followed by a private investigator, and a creditor of theirs was located and provided free legal assistance to sue them. Woods told a local paper, "The biggest concern I have is for my children. Obviously I worry about their safety. I can never let them answer the phone or the door." Private investigator Eugene Ingram persuaded a creditor of Richard Woods' failed building firm to accept free help from Scientologists to pursue her money. As a result, the family was bankrupted.

The Church spread leaflets calling Woods a "hate campaigner" around her East Grinstead neighbourhood and on the High Street. Woods sued for libel, and in response the Church took out three libel suits against her. In 1999, after six years of litigation and 25 appearances in court, eventually reaching the High Court, the Church of Scientology admitted in open court that the claims were untrue, and agreed to pay £55,000 for damages and Woods' costs estimated at £100,000. She told journalists that during the case she had been subjected to a "level of harassment that most people would find intolerable".

== See also ==
- Fair game (Scientology)
- Scientology controversies
- Scientology litigation
- Scientology in the United Kingdom
