= The Thriving Cult of Greed and Power =

1991 newsmagazine article on Scientology

- Cover page in Time's issue: "The Thriving Cult of Greed and Power"
- Writer: Richard Behar
- Categories: Investigative journalism
- Frequency: Published in Time, May 1991 and Reader's Digest, October 1991
- First issue: May 6, 1991
- Country: United States

"The Thriving Cult of Greed and Power" is an article, written in 1991 by U.S. investigative journalist Richard Behar, which is highly critical of Scientology. It was first published by Time magazine on May 6, 1991, as an eight-page cover story, and was later published in Reader's Digest in October 1991. Behar had previously published an article on Scientology in Forbes magazine. He stated that he was investigated by attorneys and private investigators affiliated with the Church of Scientology while researching the Time article, and that investigators contacted his friends and family as well. Behar's article covers topics including L. Ron Hubbard and the development of Scientology, its controversies over the years and history of litigation, conflict with psychiatry and the U.S. Internal Revenue Service, the suicide of Noah Lottick, its status as a religion, and its business dealings.

After the article's publication, the Church of Scientology mounted a public relations campaign to address issues in the piece. It took out advertisements in USA Today for twelve weeks, and Church leader David Miscavige was interviewed by Ted Koppel on Nightline about what he considered to be an objective bias by the article's author. Miscavige alleged that the article was actually driven by the company Eli Lilly, because of Scientology's efforts against the drug Prozac. The Church of Scientology brought a libel suit against Time Warner and Behar, and sued Reader's Digest in multiple countries in Europe in an attempt to stop the article's publication there. The suit against Times Warner was dismissed in 1996, and the Church of Scientology's petition for a writ of certiorari to the Supreme Court of the United States was denied in 2001.

Behar received awards in honor of his work on the article, including the Gerald Loeb Award, the Worth Bingham Prize, and the Conscience-in-Media Award. The article has had ramifications in the current treatment of Scientology in the media, with some publications theorizing that journalists are wary of the litigation that Time Warner went through. The article was cited by Anderson Cooper on CNN, in a story on Panorama's 2007 program "Scientology and Me" on the BBC, and has been used as a reference for background on the history of Scientology, in books from both the cult and new religious movement perspectives.

== Research for the article ==
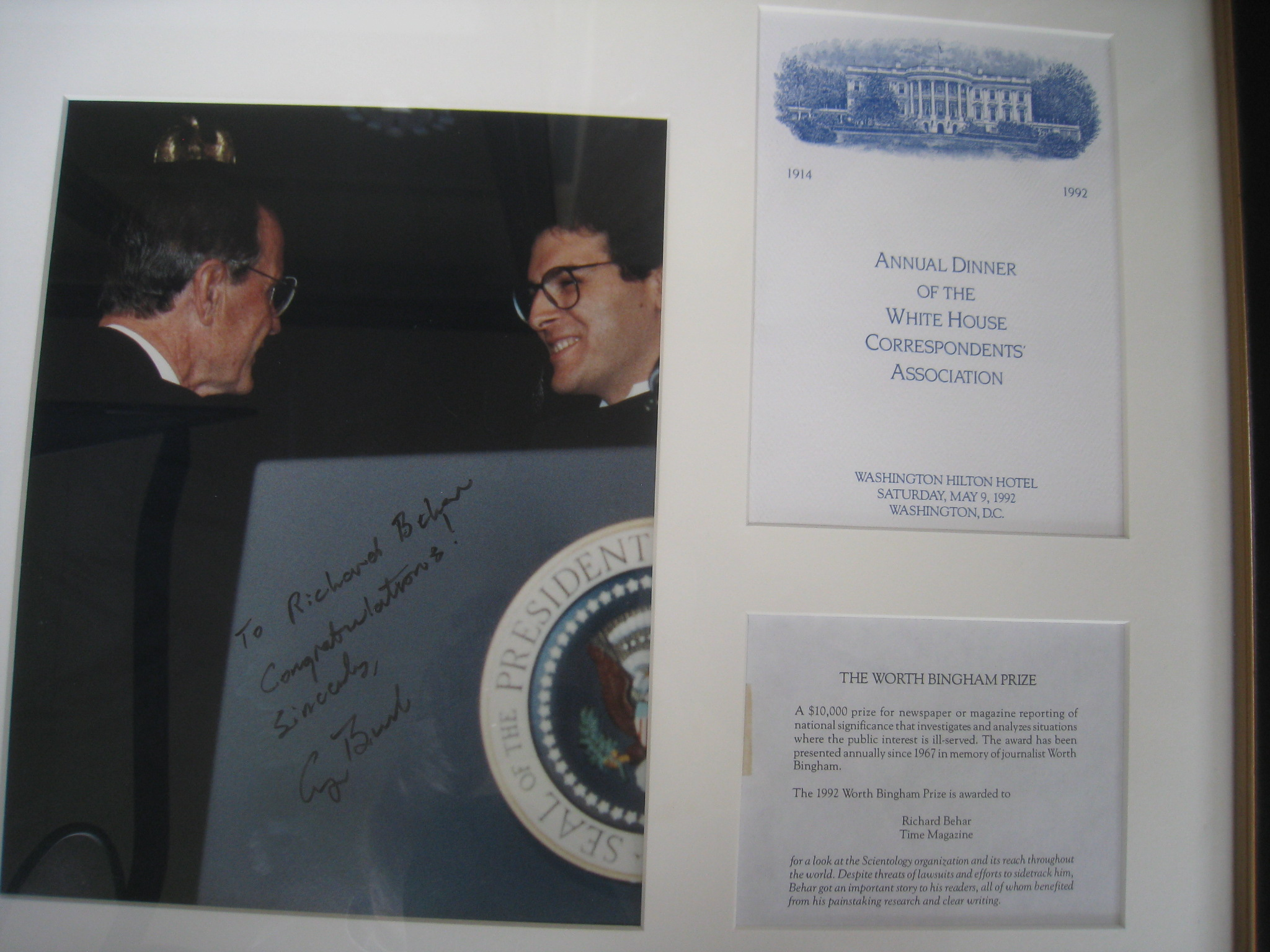
U.S. President George H. W. Bush congratulates Richard Behar upon his receiving the Worth Bingham Prize for writing the Time article (1992).

Before penning "The Thriving Cult of Greed and Power", Behar had written a 1986 article in Forbes magazine, "The Prophet and Profits of Scientology", which reported on the Church of Scientology's business dealings and L. Ron Hubbard's financial success. Behar wrote that during research for "The Thriving Cult of Greed and Power", he and a Time contributing editor were themselves investigated by ten attorneys and six private investigators affiliated with the Church of Scientology. According to Behar, investigators contacted his friends and previous co-workers to ask them if he had a history of tax or drug problems, and obtained a copy of his personal credit report that had been obtained illegally from a national credit bureau. Behar conducted 150 interviews in the course of his research for the article.

Behar wrote that the motive of these operatives was to "threaten, harass and discredit him". He later learned that the Church of Scientology had assigned its head private investigator to direct the Church's investigation into Behar. Anderson Cooper 360° reported that Behar had been contacted by Church of Scientology attorneys numerous times while doing research on the article. The parents of Noah Lottick, a Scientologist who had committed suicide, cooperated with Time and Reader's Digest.

== Synopsis ==
The full title of the article is "The Thriving Cult of Greed and Power: Ruined lives. Lost fortunes. Federal crimes. Scientology poses as a religion but is really a ruthless global scam—and aiming for the mainstream". The article reported on the founding of the Church of Scientology by L. Ron Hubbard and controversies involving the Church and its affiliated business operations, as well as the suicide of a Scientologist. The article related the May 11, 1990, suicide of Dr. Edward Lottick's son Noah Antrim Lottick. Lottick was a Russian studies student who had taken a series of Scientology courses; he died after jumping from a hotel tenth floor window. The Church of Scientology and Lottick's family have differing positions on the effect Scientology coursework had on him. While none of the parties assigned blame, they expressed misgivings about his death. Initially, his father had thought that Scientology was similar to Dale Carnegie's self-improvement techniques; however, after his ordeal, the elder Lottick came to believe that the organization is a "school for psychopaths". Mike Rinder, then head of the Church of Scientology's Office of Special Affairs and a Church spokesman, stated "I think Ed Lottick should look in the mirror... I think Ed Lottick made his son's life intolerable".

The article outlined a brief history of Scientology, discussing Hubbard's initial background as a science fiction writer, and cited a California judge who had deemed Hubbard a "pathological liar". The Church of Scientology's litigation history was described, in addition to its conflicts with the Internal Revenue Service, with countries regarding whether or not to accept it as a religion, and its position against psychiatry. Behar wrote of the high costs involved in participation in the Church of Scientology, what he referred to as "front groups and financial scams", and harassment of critics. He estimated that the Church of Scientology paid US$20 million annually to over one hundred attorneys. Behar maintained that though the Church of Scientology portrays itself as a religion, it was actually a "hugely profitable global racket" which intimidated members and critics in a Mafia-like manner.

Cynthia Kisser, then director of the Cult Awareness Network, was quoted: "Scientology is quite likely the most ruthless, the most classically terroristic, the most litigious and the most lucrative cult the country has ever seen. No cult extracts more money from its members".

== Post-publication ==
=== Church of Scientology's response ===
The Church of Scientology responded to the publication of "The Thriving Cult of Greed and Power" by taking out color full-page ads in USA Today in May and June 1991, on every weekday for twelve weeks, denouncing the Time magazine cover article. Two official Church of Scientology responses were titled "Facts vs. Fiction, A Correction of Falsehoods Contained in the May 6, 1991, Issues of Time Magazine", and "The Story That Time Couldn't Tell". Prior to the advertising campaign, Scientologists distributed 88-page bound booklets which disputed points from Behar's article. The "Fact vs. Fiction" piece was a 1/4-inch-thick (0.64 cm) booklet, which criticized Behar's article and asserted "Behar's article omits the information on the dozens of community service programs conducted by Scientologists ... which have been acknowledged by community officials". One of the advertisements in USA Today accused Time of promoting Adolf Hitler and Nazi Germany, and featured a 1936 issue of Time which had Hitler's picture on the front cover. The Church of Scientology sent out a news release condemning Time's "horrible history of supporting fascism", and said that the article was written because Time had been pressured by "vested interests". When asked by the St. Petersburg Times whether this was the case, Time Executive Editor Richard Duncan responded "Good Lord, no". Heber Jentzsch, at the time president of Church of Scientology International, issued a four-page news release which stated "Advertising is the only way the church could be assured of getting its message and its side of the story out to the public without the same vested interests behind the Time article distorting it".

After the advertising run critiquing Time magazine in USA Today had completed, the Church of Scientology mounted a $3 million public relations campaign about Scientology in USA Today, in June 1991. The Church of Scientology placed a 48-page advertising supplement in 1.8 million copies of USA Today. In a statement to the St. Petersburg Times, Scientology spokesman Richard Haworth explained "What we are trying to do is put the actual facts of Dianetics and Scientology out there".

In response to the Church of Scientology's claims of inaccuracies in the article, a lawyer for Time responded "We've reviewed all of their allegations, and find nothing wrong with the Time story." In June 1991, Newsweek reported that staffers for Time said they had received calls from a man claiming to be a paralegal for Time, who asked them if they had signed a confidentiality form about the article. Time editors sent staffers a computer memo, warning them about calls related to the article, and staffers told Newsweek that "sources named in the story say detectives have asked about their talks with Time". A Church of Scientology spokesman called the claims "scurrilous".

On February 14, 1992, Scientology leader David Miscavige gave Ted Koppel his first interview on Scientology on the ABC News program Nightline. The program noted that Scientology has vocal critics and cited Behar's 1991 article. Behar appeared on the program and gave his opinion of why individuals join Scientology, stating that the organization's "ulterior motive" is really to get people to take high-priced audit counseling. Behar stated on the program that he had evidence that members of the Church of Scientology had obtained his personal phone records. Later in the program, Koppel questioned Miscavige on the Church of Scientology's response to the Time magazine article, particularly the $3 million the church spent advertising in USA Today. Miscavige explained that the first three weeks of the advertising campaign was meant to correct falsehoods from the Time article, and the rest of the twelve-week campaign was dedicated to informing the public about Scientology. Koppel asked Miscavige what specifically had upset him about the Time article, and Miscavige called Behar "a hater". Miscavige noted that Behar had written an article on Scientology and the Internal Revenue Service three years before he began work on the Time piece, and made allegations that Behar had attempted to get two Scientologists kidnapped. When Koppel questioned Miscavige further on this, Miscavige said that individuals had contacted Behar after an earlier article, and Behar had told them to "kidnap Scientologists out". Koppel pressed further, noting that this was a serious charge to make, and asked Miscavige if his allegations were accurate, why he had not pressed charges for attempted kidnapping. Miscavige said Koppel was "missing the issue", and said that his real point was that he thought the article was not an objective piece.

Miscavige alleged on Nightline that the article itself was published as a result of a request by Eli Lilly and Company, because of "the damage we had caused to their killer drug Prozac". When Koppel asked Miscavige if he had affidavits or evidence to this effect, Miscavige responded "You think they'd admit it?" Miscavige stated that "Eli Lilly ordered a reprint of 750,000 copies of Time magazine before it came out", and that his attempts to investigate the matter with Eli Lilly and associated advertising companies were not successful.

=== Litigation ===
The Church brought a libel lawsuit against Time Warner and Behar, seeking damages of $416 million. The Church alleged false and defamatory statements were made concerning the Church of Scientology International in the Time article. More specifically, the Church of Scientology's court statements claimed that Behar had been refining an anti-Scientology focus since his 1986 article in Forbes, which included gathering negative materials about Scientology, and "never accepting anything a Scientologist said and uniformly ignoring anything positive he learned about the Church". In its initial complaint filing, the Church quoted portions of the Behar article that it alleged were false and defamatory, including the quote from Cynthia Kisser, and Behar's own assertion that Scientology was a "global racket" that intimidated individuals in a "Mafia-like manner".

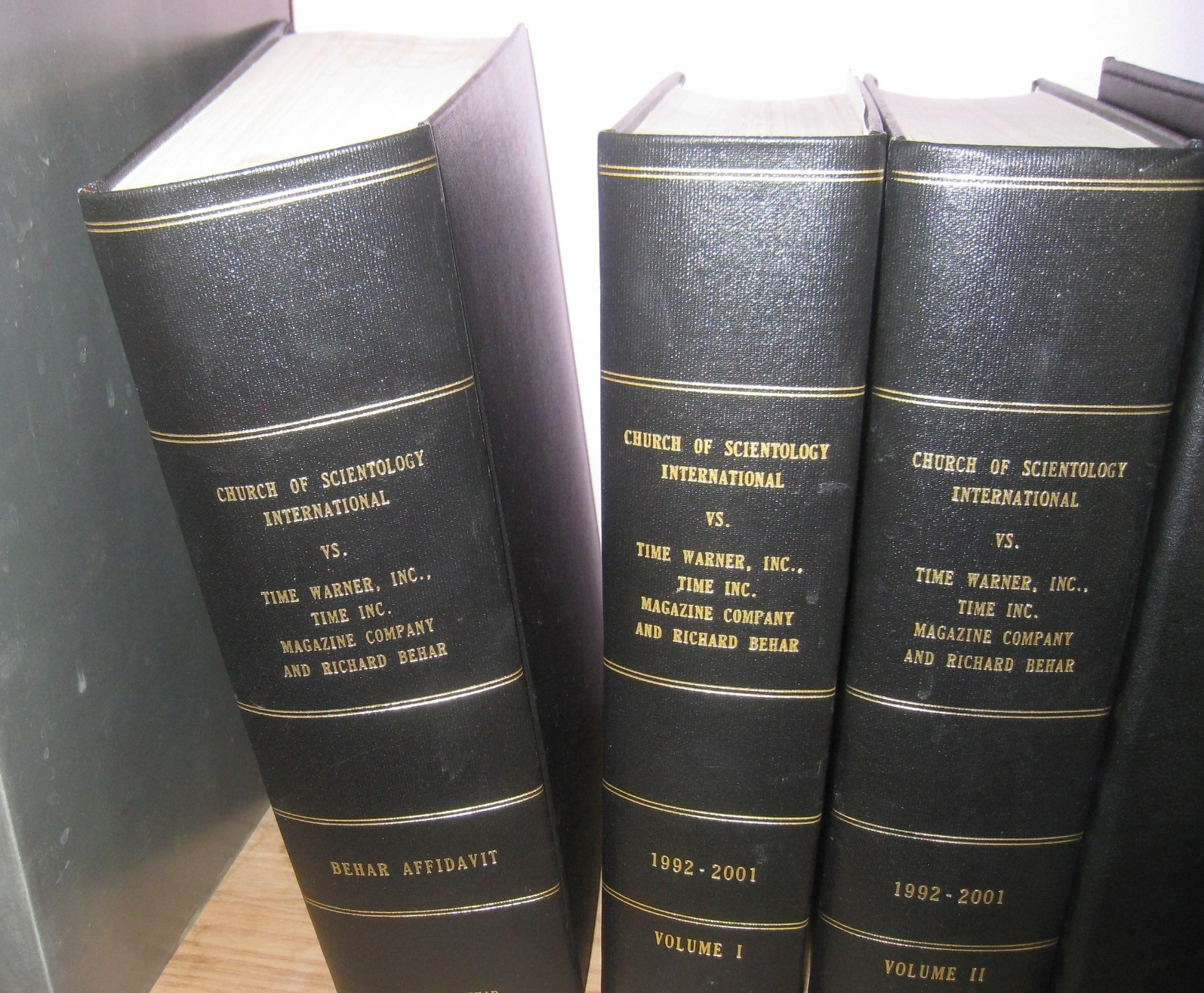
Bound volumes of documents from U.S. federal court proceedings, in the case Church of Scientology International vs. Time Warner Inc. and Richard Behar

Noah Lottick's parents submitted affidavits in the case, in which they "affirmed the accuracy of each statement in the article"; Edward Lottick "concluded that Scientology therapies were manipulations, and that no Scientology staff members attended the funeral" of their son. During the litigation, the Church of Scientology attempted to subpoena Behar in a separate ongoing lawsuit with the Internal Revenue Service, and accused a federal magistrate of leaking information to him. Behar was questioned for over 190 hours during 30 days of depositions with Scientology attorneys in the libel case. One question was about Behar's life in his parents' home while he was still inside the womb. St. Petersburg Times explained that this question was prompted by Scientology teachings that certain problems come from prenatal memories. Behar told the St. Petersburg Times he "felt it was extremely excessive". In a countersuit, Behar brought up the issues of Church of Scientology private investigators and what he viewed as harassment. By July 1996, all counts of the libel suit had been dismissed. In the course of the litigation through 1996, Time Warner had spent $7.3 million in legal defense costs. The Church of Scientology also sued several individuals quoted in the Time article.

The Church of Scientology sued Reader's Digest in Switzerland, France, Italy, the Netherlands, and Germany for publishing a condensed version of the Time story. The only court to provide a temporary injunction was in Lausanne, Switzerland. In France, Italy, and the Netherlands, the courts either dismissed the Church of Scientology's motions, or set injunction hearings far beyond the date of actual publication. The company defied the injunction and mailed copies of the article, "Scientology: A Dangerous Cult Goes Mainstream", to their 326,000 Swiss subscribers. Worldwide editor-in-chief of Reader's Digest, Kenneth Tomlinson, told The New York Times that "a publisher cannot accept a court prohibiting distribution of a serious journalistic piece. ... The court order violates freedom of speech and freedom of the press". The Church of Scientology subsequently filed a criminal complaint against the Digest in Lausanne, and Mike Rinder stated it was in blatant violation of the law. By defying the Swiss court ban, the Reader's Digest risked a fine of about $3,400, as well as a potential three months' jail time for the Swiss Digest editor-in-chief. A hearing on the injunction was set for November 11, 1991, and the injunction was later lifted by the Swiss court.

In January 2001, a United States federal appeals court upheld the dismissal of the Church of Scientology International's case against Time Warner. In its opinion, the United States Court of Appeals for the Second Circuit ruled that Time Warner had not published "The Thriving Cult of Greed and Power" with an actual intent of malice, a standard that must be met for libel cases involving individuals and public groups. On October 1, 2001, the Supreme Court of the United States refused to consider reinstating the church's libel case Church of Scientology International v. Time Warner Inc., 00-1683. Time Warner said it refused to be "intimidated by the church's apparently limitless legal resources." In arguments presented to the Supreme Court, the Church of Scientology acknowledged that church officials had "committed improper acts" in the past, but also claimed that: "allegations of past misconduct were false and distorted, the result of the misunderstanding, suspicion and prejudice that typically greet a new religion". Of the rulings for Time Warner, the Church of Scientology complained that they "provide a safe harbor for biased journalism". Behar commented on the Church of Scientology's legal defeat, and said that the lawsuit had a chilling effect: "It's a tremendous defeat for Scientology ... But of course their doctrine states that the purpose of a suit is to harass, not to win, so from that perspective they hurt us all. They've had a real chilling effect on journalism, both before and after my piece".

=== Awards ===
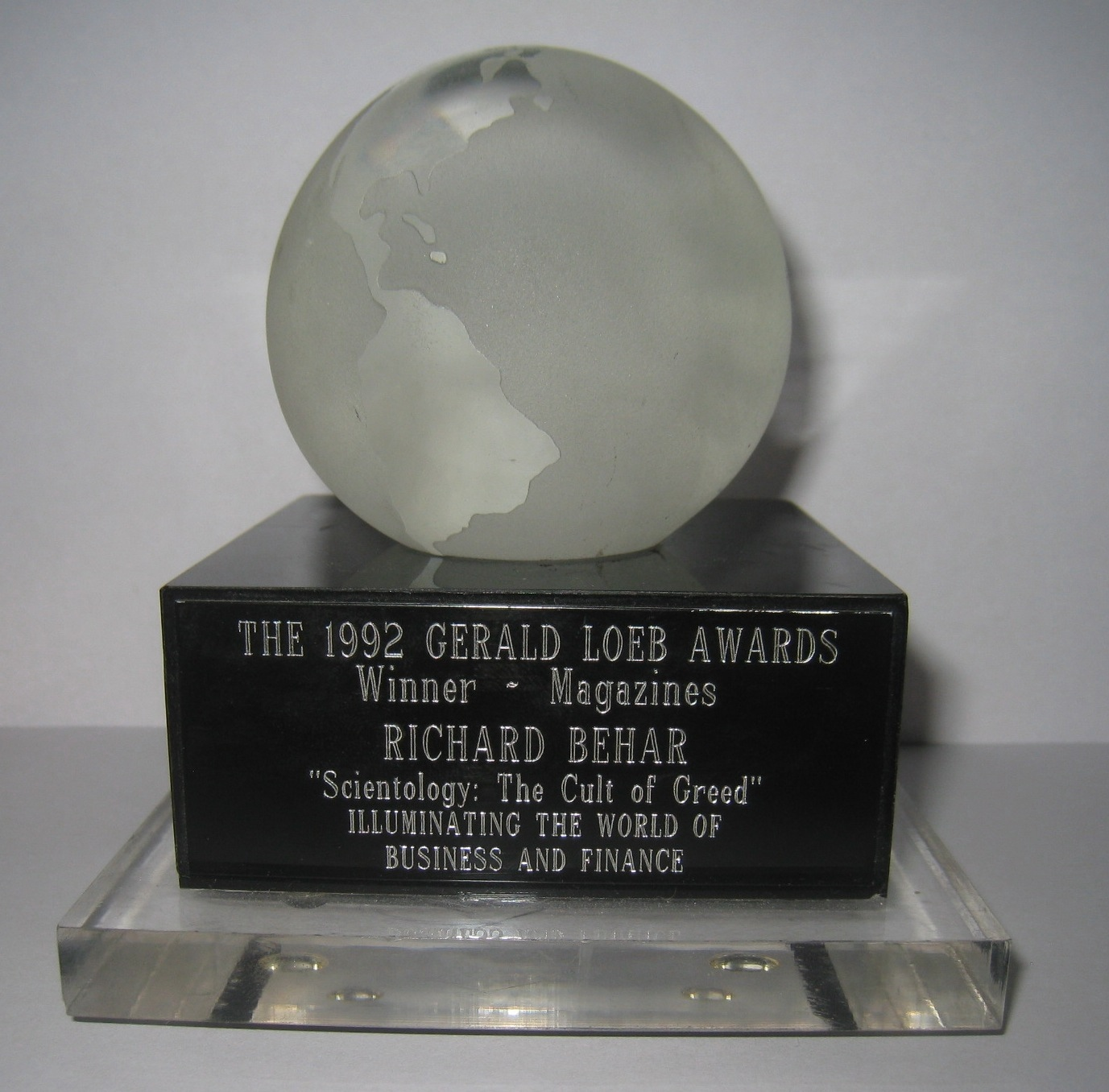
Gerald Loeb Award

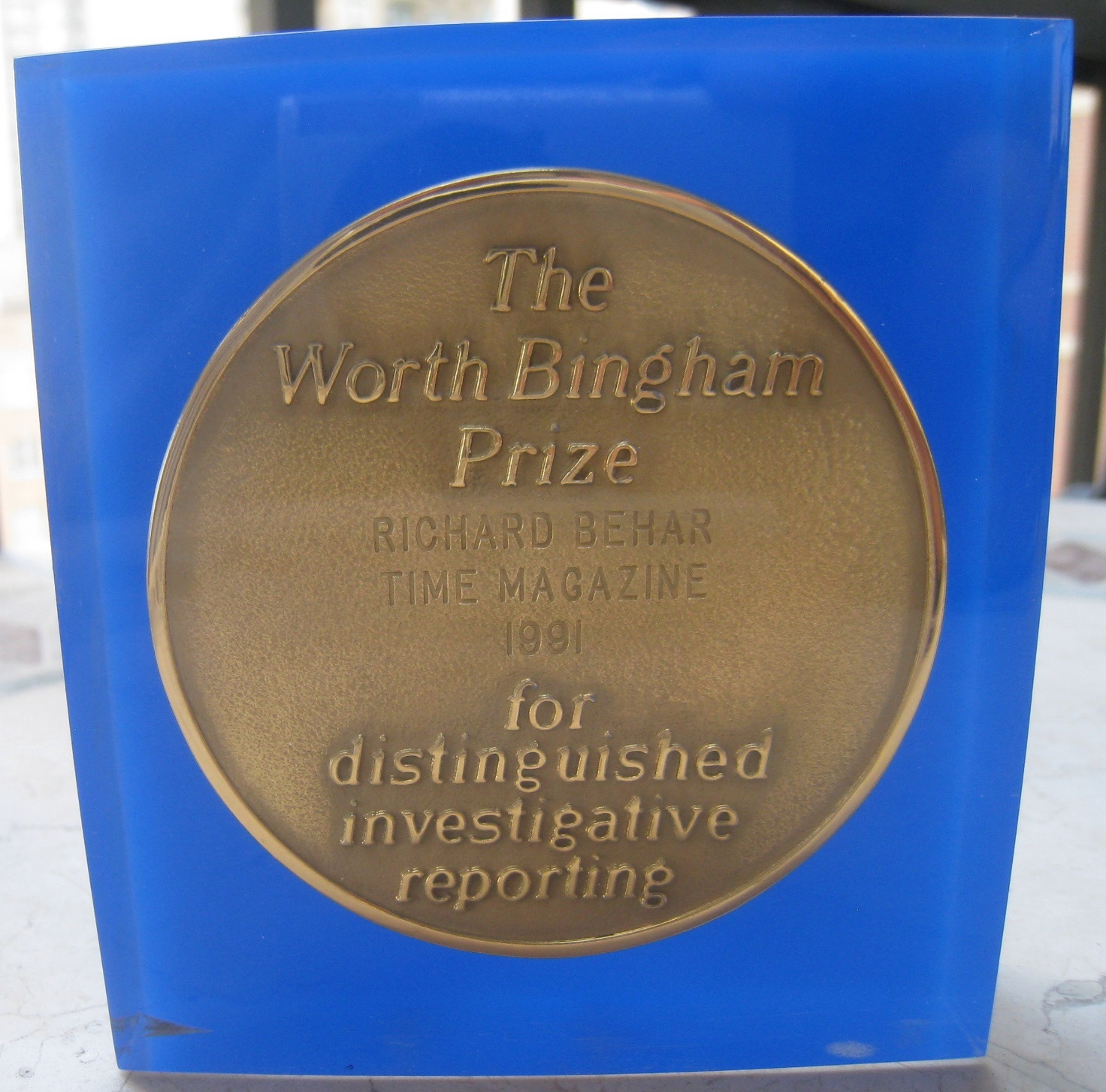
Worth Bingham Prize

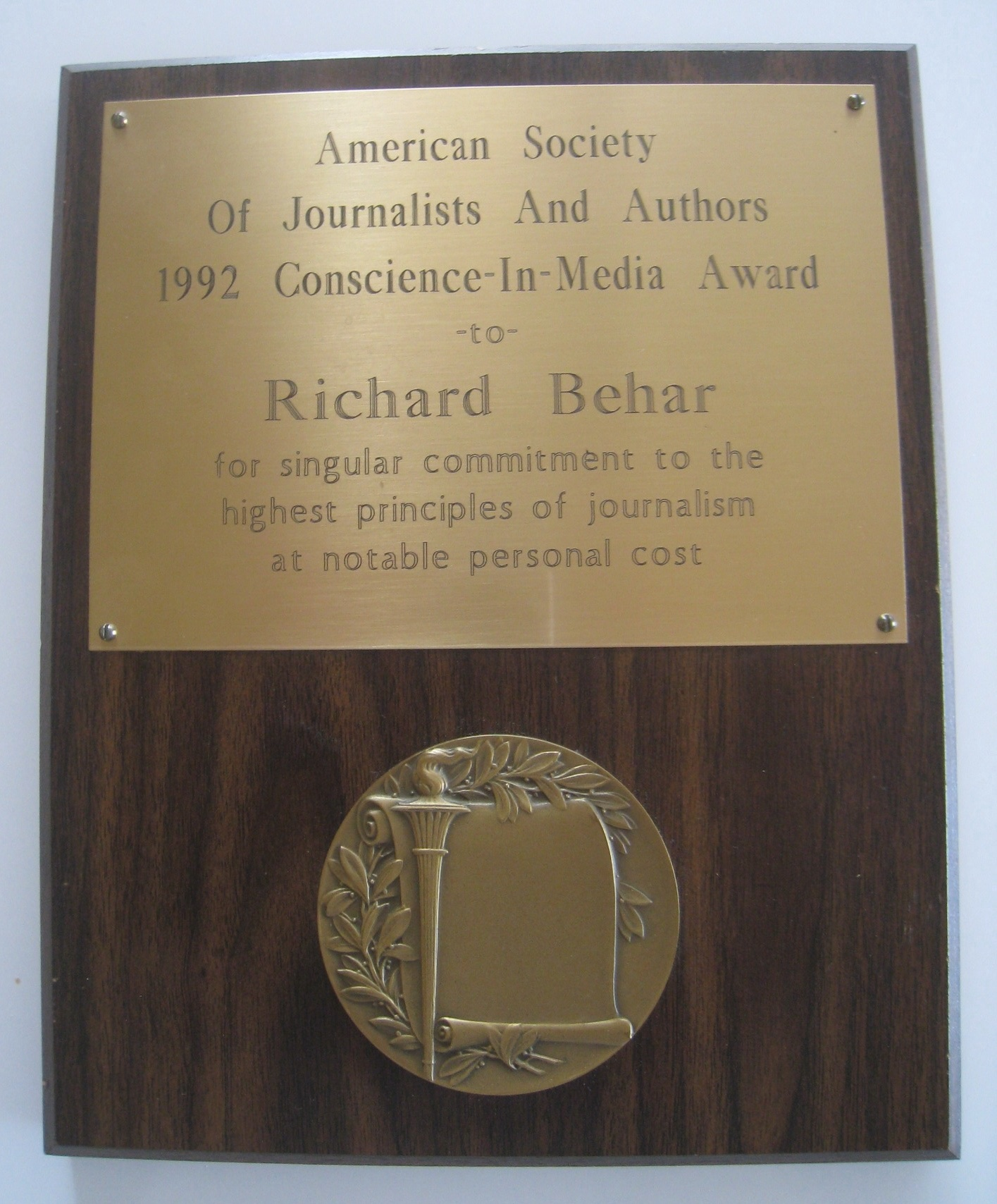
Conscience-in-Media Award

Awards received by Time and Richard Behar

As a result of writing the piece, Behar was presented with the 1992 Gerald Loeb Award for distinguished business and financial journalism, the Worth Bingham Prize, the Conscience-in-Media Award from the American Society of Journalists and Authors, awarded to "those who have demonstrated singular commitment to the highest principles of journalism at notable personal cost or sacrifice," and the Cult Awareness Network's Leo J. Ryan Award, in honor of Congressman Leo J. Ryan. Paulette Cooper was also awarded the 1992 Conscience-in-Media Award by the American Society of Journalists and Authors, for her book The Scandal of Scientology. This was the only time in the history of the American Society of Journalists and Authors that the award was presented to more than one journalist in the same year.

In a February 1992 issue of Time, editor Elizabeth Valk congratulated Behar on his Conscience-in-Media Award, stating "Needless to say, we are delighted and proud". Valk noted that the honor had only been awarded seven times in the previous seventeen years of its existence. Managing editor Henry Muller also congratulated Behar in an April 1992 issue of Time.

== Analysis ==
Insane Therapy noted that Scientology "achieved more notoriety ... with the publication of the journalist Richard Behar's highly critical article". Larson's Book of World Religions and Alternative Spirituality described the cover design of the article as it appeared in Time, writing that it "shouted" the headline from the magazine cover. In a 2005 piece, Salon.com magazine noted that for those interested in the Church of Scientology, the Time article still remains a "milestone in news coverage", and that those who back the Church believe it was "an outrageously biased account".

== Legacy ==
The Church of Scientology's use of private investigators was cited in a 1998 article in the Boston Herald, and compared to Behar's experiences when researching "The Thriving Cult of Greed and Power". After the paper ran a five-part series of critical articles in 1998, then Church of Scientology President Heber Jentzsch confirmed that a private investigative firm was hired to look into the personal life of Joseph Mallia, the reporter who wrote the articles. In a later piece titled "Church of Scientology probes Herald reporter—Investigation follows pattern of harassment" this investigation was likened to Behar's assertions of harassment, as well as other reporters' experiences from 1974, 1988, and 1997.

Because of the history of conflict between Reader's Digest and Scientology, the writer of a 2005 cover story on Tom Cruise agreed to certain demands, including giving Scientology issues equal play in the writer's profile of Cruise, submitting questions for Cruise to Church of Scientology handlers, and sending the writer of the article to a one-day Church immersion course. Also in 2005, an article in Salon questioned whether the tactics of the Church's litigation and private investigations of Time Warner and other media sources had succeeded in decreasing the amount of investigative journalism pieces on Scientology in the press. A 2005 article in The Sunday Times cited the article, and came to the determination that the Church of Scientology's lawsuit against Time Warner "served to warn off other potential investigations", and that "The chill evidently lingers still".

"The Thriving Cult of Greed and Power" continues to be used today by journalists in the media, as a reference for historical information on the Church of Scientology. In April 2007, CNN anchor Anderson Cooper interviewed former Office of Special Affairs director Mike Rinder, in a live piece on Anderson Cooper 360° titled "Inside Scientology". The CNN story was prompted by the May 2007 airing of a BBC Panorama investigative program, "Scientology and Me". In the interview, Anderson Cooper quoted directly from "The Thriving Cult of Greed and Power" article, when asking Rinder about the history of Operation Snow White, and if those tactics were currently used by the Church. Rinder answered by stating that the individuals involved with Operation Snow White were no longer involved in Church of Scientology activities, and that the incident was "ancient history". Cooper then again referenced the Time magazine article noting that Behar asserted that he was illegally investigated by Scientology contacts during research for his article. Cooper questioned Rinder on the dismissed lawsuit against Time Warner, and Rinder acknowledged that all of the Church of Scientology's appeals against Time Warner were eventually rejected.

== See also ==
- Bibliography of books critical of Scientology
