= Andre Tabayoyon =

Former Scientologist and critic of Scientology

- Occupation(s): Former United States Marine Corps, Former head of security, Gold Base, Church of Scientology (Per affidavit in U.S. Federal court)

Andre Tabayoyon is a former member of the Church of Scientology who is primarily known for an affidavit in which he describes the inner workings of the Church. Among other things, he states in his affidavit that he was formerly in charge of security at the Church's Gold Base near Hemet, California.

Tabayoyon was a member of the Church's Sea Organization, serving with L. Ron Hubbard and Mary Sue Hubbard on the Scientology ship MV Apollo during the early 1970s. His wife, Mary was Hubbard's cook and Andre was Hubbard's steward. As ship crew he taught Hubbard's original personal assistants in martial arts.

He gave testimony about the COS in an affidavit (Note: Case 91-CV-6426 is the number of an existing sealed case per the United States Federal Court electronic retrieval system, PACER. However, per an appeal of this case, and an order by Judges for the United States Court of Appeals, the motion to seal this case was denied.) introduced as evidence in the case Church of Scientology International v. Fishman and Geertz.

In his 60-page affidavit, he states that the COS trained him in psychological techniques to create obedience through the use of terror. Tabayoyon gave examples of people being driven insane by the "higher levels" of Hubbard's teaching and even said that this is sometimes done intentionally. In the affidavit, he stated under oath that the base is stockpiling weapons and ammunition.

Tabayoyon stated that Scientology staff were instructed in how to act around Tom Cruise, when he visited the Gold Base compound in Gilman Hot Springs, California. According to Tabayoyon, members were only allowed to talk to Cruise if he talked to them first, Cruise had to "originate the communications". Those that violated this rule were given "conditioning". Tabayoyon stated in his affidavit that Gold Base guards possessed shotguns, automatic weapons, and semi-automatic assault rifles. The Church of Scientology has questioned the veracity of reports of former members Tabayoyon and Dennis Erlich and suggested they "distorted" some of the incidents they described.

Tabayoyon served in the United States Marine Corps, in the Vietnam War. After his service in the Vietnam war, Tabayoyon began to pay for coursework in Scientology. He served in various positions including the Rehabilitation Project Force, for 21 years, leaving, according to his affidavit, after a falling out with David Miscavige.
