= David S. Touretzky =

American computer scientist

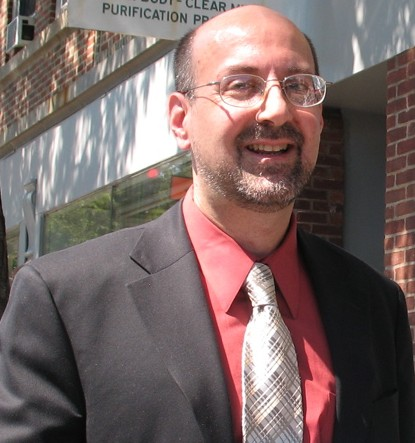
- David S. Touretzky in 2007
- Born: United States
- Education: Rutgers University, B.A., 1978; Carnegie Mellon University, Ph.D., 1984
- Known for: Criticism of Scientology, free speech activism
- Awards: ACM Distinguished Scientist, 2006
- Scientific career
- Fields: Artificial intelligence, computational neuroscience
- Workplaces: Carnegie Mellon University

David S. Touretzky is a research professor in the Computer Science Department and the Center for the Neural Basis of Cognition at Carnegie Mellon University. He received a BA in Computer Science at Rutgers University in 1978, and earned a master's degree and a Ph.D. (1984) in Computer Science at Carnegie Mellon University. Touretzky has worked as an Internet activist in favor of freedom of speech, especially what he perceives as abuse of the legal system by government and private authorities. He is a notable critic of Scientology.

== Research ==
Touretzky's research interests lie in the fields of artificial intelligence, computational neuroscience, and learning. This includes machine learning and animal learning, and in particular neural representation of space in rodents (e.g., in the hippocampus) and in robots. In 2006, he was recognized as an ACM Distinguished Scientist.

== Criticism of Scientology ==
Since the 1990s, Touretzky has worked to expose the actions of the Church of Scientology. He sees the actions of the organization as a threat to free speech, and he has taken a prominent part in Internet-based activism to oppose it, also appearing regularly as a critic in radio and print. He has also worked to expose what he sees as dangerous and potentially life-threatening treatments provided by Narconon, the Scientology-based drug rehabilitation program. He maintains a Web site named Stop Narconon, which archives media articles critical of the program. Dr. Touretzky's research into Narconon was a primary source of information for a series of San Francisco Chronicle newspaper articles criticizing Narconon on June 9 and June 10, 2004 that ultimately led to the organization's program being rejected by the California school system in early 2005.

Touretzky has undertaken extensive research into the secret upper levels of Scientology, and he has made this information available to the public on the OT III Scholarship Page (concerning Xenu) and the NOTs Scholars Page (concerning the higher Operating Thetan levels). These pages, he states, are academic studies of Scientology's texts, and the proprietary materials are therefore legally available due to careful application of the academic fair use provisions of copyright law. The Church has failed in their attempts to have them removed, after repeatedly threatening Touretzky with lawsuits and filing complaints against him with Carnegie Mellon University. Carnegie Mellon, in turn, has issued statements in support of Professor Touretzky, noting that his criticism of Scientology is a personal affair and not the opinion of the University itself.

Touretzky has been the object of public attacks by the Church of Scientology, including various "dead agent" campaigns against him. He has been accused of religious bigotry, racism, misogyny, misuse of government funds, support for terrorism, and collusion with the pharmaceutical industry, among other misdeeds.

== Free-speech activism ==
David Touretzky is an Internet free-speech activist. He has supported several movements in what he perceives as abuse of the legal system by government and private authorities.

In 2000, Touretzky testified as an expert witness for the defense in Universal City Studios et al. v. Reimerdes et al., a suit brought by seven motion picture studios against the publishers of 2600: The Hacker Quarterly (the case name refers to Shawn Reimerdes, an unrelated defendant who settled prior to trial.) The suit concerned the publication of DVD decryption software known as DeCSS, which the plaintiffs asserted was illegal under the Digital Millennium Copyright Act. Dr. Touretzky testified as an expert in computer science on the expressive nature of computer code, and convinced the court that code was indeed speech. Touretzky also created an online gallery of various renditions of the DeCSS software. Readers sent in their own renditions of the decryption algorithm, including a mathematical description, a haiku, and a square dance.

In reaction to the federal prosecution and eventual imprisonment of 18-year-old political activist Sherman Austin for hosting bomb-making instructions entitled Reclaim Guide on his web site, Dr. Touretzky provided a mirror on his Carnegie Mellon website for more than two years, although he acknowledged on the website that his own reposting of the information did not violate the plain language of the statute under which Austin was convicted. In May 2004, to avoid harassment of the university and controversy in the media, Dr. Touretzky moved the mirror from the Carnegie Mellon server to a private site.

In 2011, Touretzky began hosting a mirror of the website of George Hotz, containing executable files and instructions facilitating the jailbreaking of the Sony PlayStation 3, after Sony filed lawsuits against Hotz and other hackers aiming to utilize the takedown provisions of the DMCA to remove the content from the Internet.

== Publications ==
Books

- David S. Touretzky, The Mathematics of Inheritance Systems (Research Notes in Artificial Intelligence), Los Altos, California: Morgan Kaufmann, 1986. ISBN 0-934613-06-0.
- David S. Touretzky, Common Lisp: A Gentle Introduction to Symbolic Computation, Redwood City, California: Benjamin Cummings, 1990. ISBN 0-8053-0492-4. Out of print, but electronic versions are available.
- David S. Touretzky, Common Lisp: A Gentle Introduction to Symbolic Computation, Mineola, New York: Dover Publications, Inc., 2013. ISBN 978-0-486-49820-1. The Dover edition, first published in 2013, is a revised republication of work originally published by The Benjamin/Cummings Publishing Company, Inc., in 1990.

Articles

- David S. Touretzky, "Viewpoint: Free speech rights for programmers", Communications of the ACM 44(8):23–25, August 2001. doi:10.1145/381641.381651, extended version. (On DeCSS.)
- David S. Touretzky and Peter Alexander, "A church's lethal contract", Razor, 2003. (On Scientology.)

Other

- David S. Touretzky et al., "Gallery of CSS descramblers".
- Advances in Neural Information Processing Systems 8: Proceedings of the 1995 Conference (editor) ISBN 0-262-20107-0
- Advances in Neural Information Processing Systems 7: Proceedings of the 1994 Conference (editor) ISBN 0-262-20104-6
- Proceedings of the 1993 Connectionist Models Summer School (co-author) ISBN 0-8058-1590-2
- Connectionist Models: Proceedings of the 1990 Summer School (co-author) ISBN 1-55860-156-2
- Proceedings of the 1988 Connectionist Models (co-author) ISBN 1-55860-035-3
