= Anastasius Nordenholz =

Anastasius Nordenholz (1862 - 1953) is the author of Scientologie, Wissenschaft von der Beschaffenheit und der Tauglichkeit des Wissens (Scientology, Science of the Constitution and Usefulness of Knowledge) written in 1933.

== His life ==
Anastasius Nordenholz was born on February 1, 1862, in Buenos Aires, Argentina. At the age of 16 he came to Germany and studied law, political economics and philosophy successively in Berlin, Zurich and Jena. He then went to Munich, studying there as a private scholar until around 1905.

In 1904, he published a study titled Allgemeine Theorie der gesellschaftlichen Produktion (General Theory of the Production in Society), which was linked with Schopenhauer and in which he examined Kant's criticism. This concerned political economics, with a focus on the science of human thinking and knowledge. This book was followed in 1927 with Welt als Individuation - Entwurf eines Individuationismus (World as Individuation - Concept of an Individuationism). A supplement of the Publishing House Felix Meiner in Leipzig said:

“the author wants to unify the two big tendencies of European Spirituality, namely Kant's criticism and Darwin's selectionism. He tries to place the means of thinking of both directions in a neutral conceptional system and therewith tries to obtain a starting point in order to actually establish a critical statement regarding our conceptual thinking. The new unification is called individuationism. Hence a methodology of thinking of the world is signified which is based on the assumption of a world creative role of individuation. Within individuation, the inner circle of the consciousness and the outer circle of the senses have one and the same denominator. Perhaps we find here the decisive word for a solution to the rational-irrational crisis from which our actual conceptual thinking suffers".

His work Scientologie, Wissenschaft von der Beschaffenheit und der Tauglichkeit des Wissens ("Scientology Science of the Constitution and Usefulness of Knowledge") was published in 1934. The Church of Scientology has actively but in vain tried to suppress the book, as well as the domain name “scientologie”.

He spent the remainder of his life in Las Rosas, in the southwest of the province of Santa Fe, Argentina, to which he came back to after World War I. He subsequently returned to Germany only as visitor. Nordenholz died at the age of 91 on September 21, 1953, in Santa Fe, Argentina.

== See also ==
- Scientologie, Wissenschaft von der Beschaffenheit und der Tauglichkeit des Wissens
