= Arnie Lerma =

American Scientology critic (1950–2018)

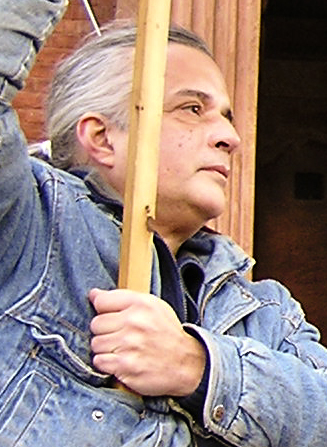
- Lerma in 2008
- Born: November 18, 1950; Washington, D.C., U.S.
- Died: March 16, 2018 (aged 67); Sylvania, Georgia, U.S.
- Occupation: A/V technician
- Website: lermanet.com

Arnaldo Pagliarini Lerma (November 18, 1950 – March 16, 2018) was an American writer and activist, a former Scientologist, and a critic of the Church of Scientology who appeared in television, media and radio interviews. Lerma was the first person to post the court document known as the Fishman Affidavit, including the Xenu story, to the Internet via the Usenet newsgroup alt.religion.scientology.

== Personal life ==
Lerma was born in Washington, D.C., in 1950. On July 14, 2015, Lerma married Ginger Sugerman, who was also a former Scientologist.

== Time in Scientology ==
Lerma started in Scientology at the age of 16 at the urging of his mother who was the executive director of the Founding Church of Scientology Washington D.C. (FCDC). He had been impressed by the Church's exaggerated account of L. Ron Hubbard's military career and scientific credentials. Lerma joined staff at FCDC and later in New York and was a course supervisor. Around 1970, he joined Scientology's Sea Org and served for seven years, being paid $10 per week and sometimes surviving on peanut butter.

During his time in Scientology, Lerma reached the level of OT III.

In 1976 he met Hubbard's daughter Suzette. Lerma became romantically involved and they planned to elope. Their relationship was discovered and Lerma was threatened with physical harm if he did not cancel the marriage plans. Lerma quit Scientology soon afterward.

== Internet activities ==
Lerma said he didn't want to destroy Scientology, but he wanted a change of management. In the early internet, Arnie Lerma posted in the internet newsgroups "alt.religion.scientology" and "alt.clearing.technology", including posting public records from court cases involving the Church of Scientology. He scanned and posted documents he obtained, many of which were sent to him, including court documents known as the Fishman Affidavit or Fishman Declaration from the case Church of Scientology International v. Fishman and Geertz.

== Scientology sues Lerma over copyrights ==
After Lerma posted the Fishman Affidavit in August 1995, his home was raided by federal marshals, led by lawyers from the Church of Scientology, alleging he was in possession of copyrighted documents. A lawsuit was filed against Lerma and his Internet service provider by the church's Religious Technology Center (RTC), claiming copyright infringement and trade secret misappropriation.

The Washington Post and two investigative reporters were added to the lawsuit, as an article written about the raid contained three brief quotes from Scientology "Advanced Technology" documents.

The Washington Post, et al., were released from the suit when United States District Judge Leonie Brinkema ruled in a memorandum on November 28, 1995

When the RTC first approached the Court with its ex parte request for the seizure warrant and temporary restraining order, the dispute was presented as a straightforward one under copyright and trade secret law. However, the Court is now convinced that the primary motivation of RTC in suing Lerma, DGS and The Post is to stifle criticism of Scientology in general and to harass its critics. As the increasingly vitriolic rhetoric of its briefs and oral argument now demonstrates, the RTC appears far more concerned about criticism of Scientology than vindication of its secrets.

— Memorandum opinion of November 28, 1995, by U.S. District Judge Leonie Brinkema; Religious Technology Center v. Arnaldo Lerma, Washington Post, Mark Fisher, and Richard Leiby

The 1995 memorandum opinion acknowledges what Scientology practices to this day: the "fair game" policy, a written directive by L. Ron Hubbard that encourages harassment of anyone who speaks out against the church. In conclusion, the court awarded to RTC damages in the statutory minimum of $2,500 ($500 for each of five instances of non-willful copyright violation) for posting online a substantial portion of a copyrighted work "without comment, criticism, or other significant changes that could constitute fair use". The court also ordered the return to Lerma of his computer and all items seized in the ex parte search which was supposed to be narrowly limited.

"Because the RTC violated the spirit if not the letter of the law, and misled the court as to which materials were maintained and reviewed, the court vacated the writ of seizure and ordered RTC to return all seized materials."

== Lermanet ==
In 1997, Arnie Lerma started a website at lermanet.com, which concentrated on news about Scientology and on documenting lawsuits by Scientology. He was also noted for discovering an altered picture on a Scientology website on New Year's Eve in 1999, one that appeared to inflate the number of members attending a millennial event at the Los Angeles Sports Arena in California. He posted the pictures to his website identifying the alterations, with the most prominent feature being the "man with no head". The story appeared on national television and in the press.

On March 28, 2019, in an attempt to reunite with her adult children who were still in the Church of Scientology but forbidden contact with her, Lerma's widow Ginger Sugerman attempted to 'deliver a blow to the enemies of Scientology' by deleting all the webpages of Lermanet.com in the hopes that the Church would allow her to reconnect with her children. The deletion failed to achieve her goal of reuniting her family.

In late 2019, the entire website reappeared under the domain lermanet.org (a domain formerly used for a defamation website against Arnie Lerma), and Lerma's blog reappeared as arnielerma.blog. A few months later lermanet.com was restored.

== Death and legacy ==
Arnie Lerma had been suffering with severe back pain for decades, despite two surgeries, and had become addicted to opioids and was increasingly paranoid. On March 16, 2018, Arnie Lerma shot his wife Ginger Sugerman twice in the face at their home in Sylvania, Georgia, and after she fled he committed suicide by gunshot. Sugerman survived but went through six surgeries and depression. Ginger Sugerman died in 2022.

== Writings ==
- The Internet is the Liberty Tree of the 90s
- Copyrights and Why Scientology Hates Arnaldo Lerma
- Scientology Gag Agreements - A Conspiracy for Silence
- The art of deception, 1996
