= Free Zone (Scientology) =

Scientology groups independent of the Church of Scientology

The Free Zone, also known as Freezone or Independent Scientology, refers to a loose collection of individuals and groups who practice Scientology outside the authority of the Church of Scientology. These practitioners range from those who closely follow L. Ron Hubbard's early teachings to others who adapt or innovate upon them, often emphasizing a non-hierarchical and individualized approach to Scientology's methods. The Church of Scientology regards such activity as heretical and labels independent practitioners "squirrels", a term used within the Church for those who alter or use Scientology techniques without authorization.

Independent Scientology movements have existed since the early years of Dianetics, with various organizations and informal networks emerging over time, including Ron's Org, the Advanced Ability Center, and later online or decentralized communities. Free Zone practitioners typically distinguish between Scientology as a belief system and the Church as an institution, criticizing the Church's leadership, organizational practices, and changes to Hubbard's original materials.

The Free Zone has been the subject of legal disputes with the Church over trademarks and copyrights. Its groups have received varying levels of attention from government agencies, particularly in Germany where Free Zone groups are viewed as less problematic than the Church. Documentaries and journalistic accounts have portrayed the Free Zone movement as an alternative expression of Scientology outside of the Church's control.

== History ==
=== Origins (1950s–1970s) ===
The International Freezone Association, the group whose name became adopted as a generic term for independent Scientology, was not the first independent Scientologist group; the California Association of Dianetic Auditors, the oldest breakaway group still in existence, claims a founding date of December 1950 during the days of Dianetics Foundations and predating the creation of Scientology.

In 1965, a longtime Church member and "Doctor of Scientology" Jack Horner, dissatisfied with the Church's "ethics" program, developed Dianology.

=== Formation of the Free Zone (1980s) ===
David Mayo founded the Advanced Ability Center in the Santa Barbara, California area. Mayo had been the highest-ranking technical officer in Scientology, but was removed in the early 1980s by David Miscavige. Several years of harassment and litigation followed. In 1985, the Church of Scientology succeeded in getting an injunction against Mayo selling Scientology services, and in 1986 the center went bankrupt and closed.

Bill Robertson had been a Sea Org member with the Church of Scientology on the flagship Apollo. In the early 1980s, Robertson left the Church and founded Ron's Org, a loose federation of Scientology groups operating outside the Church. Headquartered in Switzerland, Ron's Org included affiliated centers in Germany, Russia, and other former parts of the Soviet Union. Robertson claimed that he was channeling messages from Hubbard after the latter's death, through which he discovered OT levels above the eight being offered by the Church. Although Ron's Org founding members were formerly part of the Church, many later Ron's Org members never had any prior involvement with the Church.

=== Later independent movements (1990s–present) ===
As well as organizations, there are also small groups of Scientologists outside the Church of Scientology who meet informally. Some avoid establishing public centers and communities for fear of legal retribution from the Church, and there are Free Zone practitioners who practice what Aled Thomas calls a "very individualized form of Scientology", encouraging innovation with Hubbard's technology.

Marty Rathbun rose in the Church of Scientology to the post of Inspector General of the Religious Technology Center. He defected in 2004 and disappeared for several years before reappearing and offering to provide Scientology auditing services. Reitman called Rathbun's activities a "virtual church" because of the sermonizing on his website. He audited people in his home in Texas, and coined the term "Independent Scientology". Following his defection, years of harassment under the Church of Scientology's "fair game" policy followed. In 2013, Rathbun stated he was "no longer a Scientologist, independent or otherwise", and Rathbun's wife filed a suit against the Church of Scientology in 2013. After winning several legal bouts, the case was dropped in 2016. Rathbun then started to criticize other prominent former Scientologists, including making videos against them which appeared in Church of Scientology advertisements, leading strongly to the conclusion that Rathbun had made some agreement with the Church.

In 2012, a Scientology center in Haifa, Israel, defected from the Church.

== Beliefs and practices ==
The term "Free Zone" or "Freezone" is used for the loose grouping of Scientologists who are not members of the Church of Scientology. Often called "freezoners", some prefer to describe their practices as "Independent Scientology" because of the associations that the term "Free Zone" has with Ron's Org and other breakaway groups.

Skeptic Magazine described the Free Zone as: "a group founded by ex-Scientologists to promote L. Ron Hubbard's ideas independent of the Church of Scientology". A Miami Herald article wrote that ex-Scientologists joined the Free Zone because they felt that Church of Scientology leadership had "strayed from Hubbard's original teachings".

Key to the Free Zone is what scholar of religion Aled Thomas called its "largely unregulated and non-hierarchical environment". Within the Free Zone there are many different interpretations of Scientology; Thomas suggested Free Zone Scientologists were divided between "purists" who emphasize loyalty to Hubbard's teachings and those more open to innovation. Freezoners typically stress that Scientology as a religion is different from the Church of Scientology as an organization, criticizing the latter's actions rather than their beliefs. They often claim to be the true inheritors of Hubbard's teachings, maintaining that Scientology's primary focus is on individual development and that that does not require a leader or membership of an organization. Some freezoners argue that auditing should be more affordable than it is as performed by the Church, and criticise the Church's lavish expenditure on buildings.

After interviewing sixteen freezoners in Denmark who had left the Church of Scientology, Elizabeth Tuxen Rubin noted that they had not renounced the belief system of Scientology.

== Relationship with the Church of Scientology ==
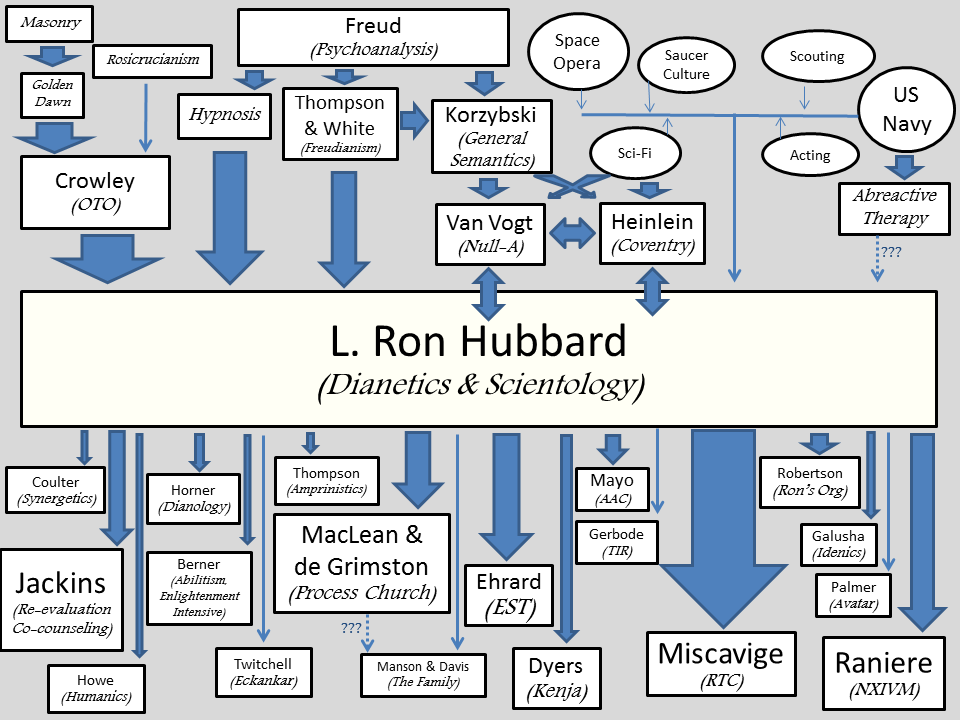
Hubbard's beliefs and practices, drawn from a diverse set of sources, influenced numerous offshoots, splinter groups, and new movements

The Church of Scientology has remained hostile to the Free Zone, regarding it as heretical. It refers to non-members who either practice Scientology or simply adopt elements of its technology as "squirrels", and their activities as "squirreling". The term "squirrels" was coined by Hubbard and originally referred only to non-Scientologists using its technology. The Church also maintains that any use of its technology by non-Church members is dangerous as they may not be used correctly. Freezoners have also accused the Church of "squirrelling", maintaining that it has changed Hubbard's words in various posthumous publications. Lewis has suggested that the Free Zone has been fueled by some of the Church's policies, including Hubbard's tendency to eject senior members who he thought could rival him and the Church's "suppressive persons" policy which discouraged reconciliation with ex-members.

The COS labels all practitioners of and believers in Scientology without its sanction "squirrels"—a term Hubbard coined to describe those who alter Scientology technology or practice it in a nonstandard fashion. Among Scientologists, the term is pejorative, and comparable in meaning to "heretic". In practice, the hierarchy of the Church of Scientology uses it to describe all of those who practice Scientology outside the Church.

As of 2016, many of the major courses and publications in the Church have been altered or deleted altogether. This is a main protest and action point for Free Zone Scientologists. Major courses, such as the Class VI and Class VIII auditor training courses, which had very high enrollment in the 1970s, have been shut down. Additionally, Scientology critics in the Free Zone movement have claimed that alterations have been made to Hubbard's original writings in Church policies and even more so in technical bulletins, with parishioners never made aware of the changes to these writings.

The Church of Scientology has used copyright and trademark laws against various Free Zone groups. Accordingly, most of the Free Zone avoids the use of officially trademarked Scientology words, including the word Scientology. In 2000, the Religious Technology Center unsuccessfully attempted to gain the Internet domain name scientologie.org in a legal action against the Free Zone.

The "Ron's Org Committee" (ROC) and the "True Source Scientology Foundation" (STSS, "Stichting True Source Scientology") have documented the argument that Scientology materials written by L. Ron Hubbard are in the public domain if certain assumptions are made. In addition the ROC has documented a legal battle over the trademark "Ron's Org".

One Free Zone Scientologist, identified as "Safe", was quoted in Salon as saying: "The Church of Scientology does not want its control over its members to be found out by the public and it doesn't want its members to know that they can get Scientology outside of the Church of Scientology".

== Perception by German government authorities ==
Scientology Commissioner Ursula Caberta in Hamburg said that the Free Zone is a type of "methadone program for Scientologists", and, in any case, "the lesser evil". According to the Free Zone conglomerate Ron's Org, the Verfassungsschutz Baden-Württemberg (State Office for the Protection of the Constitution) has stated that there is no need to keep Ron's Org under observation "as the Ron's Org has no anti-constitutional goals". There is some cooperation between members of the Ron's Org and state authorities who observe the Church of Scientology and investigate their activities.

== Portrayal in media ==
A 2006 Channel 4 documentary presented by Sikh comedian Hardeep Singh Kohli, The Beginner's Guide to L. Ron Hubbard, explored Scientology with the "Ron's Org" Free Zone group after the Church of Scientology declined to take part.

A 2017 episode of the docuseries Believer hosted by religious scholar Reza Aslan focused on Scientology; however, Aslan was unable to get in contact with any Church of Scientology officials so instead the episode featured an array of independent scientologists. Aslan has compared the Free Zone to other schisms in religious history, such as the Protestant Reformation.

== Alternative auditing practices ==
Several alternatives to Dianetics were developed in the early years of the Free Zone.

Synergetics is a self-help system developed by Art Coulter in 1954. American businessman, Don A. Purcell, Jr., joined Synergetics in 1954 after he had financially bailed out Hubbard and his Dianetics foundations and was later sued by Hubbard. In 1976, Coulter published Synergetics: An Adventure in Human Development; he later founded the Synergetic Society, which published a journal through 1996.

Idenics is a personal counseling method not affiliated with any religion, that was developed by John Galusha beginning in 1987. Galusha researched for Hubbard during the 1950s, and was one of the founders of the first Church of Scientology in 1953. Galusha claimed that all personal issues can be addressed by thoroughly looking over the problem at hand, without judgment. The counselor asks a series of questions until the solution is considered found, by the client. Mike Goldstein, the owner of Idenics methodology and author of the book, Idenics: An Alternative to Therapy, claims that the method is as effective over the telephone as in person.

== The word "Scientology" ==
Disagreement over the origins of the word Scientology has been used by Free Zone groups to contest Scientology's trademarks. A German book entitled Scientologie, Wissenschaft von der Beschaffenheit und der Tauglichkeit des Wissens was published in 1934 by Anastasius Nordenholz. The groups have argued that because Scientologie was not written by L. Ron Hubbard, the Church has unfairly monopolized control over its practice. Freezoners claim that the trademark rights to the use of the terms "Dianetics" and "E-meter" (which was invented and created by Volney Mathison) were allowed to lapse into the public domain in 1976 by Hubbard.

== See also ==
- Erhard Seminars Training (est)
- Process Church of the Final Judgement
