= 2012 in religion =

This is a timeline of events during the year 2012 that relate to religion.

== Events ==
- 8 January – The 3:16 game occurs, causing "John 3:16" to become the most searched term on Google.
- 11 January – The U.S. Supreme Court unanimously decides that federal discrimination laws do not apply to religious organizations' selection of religious leaders.
- 24 July – The United States Court of Appeals for the Ninth Circuit affirmed a lower court's decision that the Church of Scientology International has ministerial exemption from litigation.
- 25 December – In Northern Nigeria, two shootings occur at Christmas Day church services.
