= Gold Base =

International headquarters of the Church of Scientology

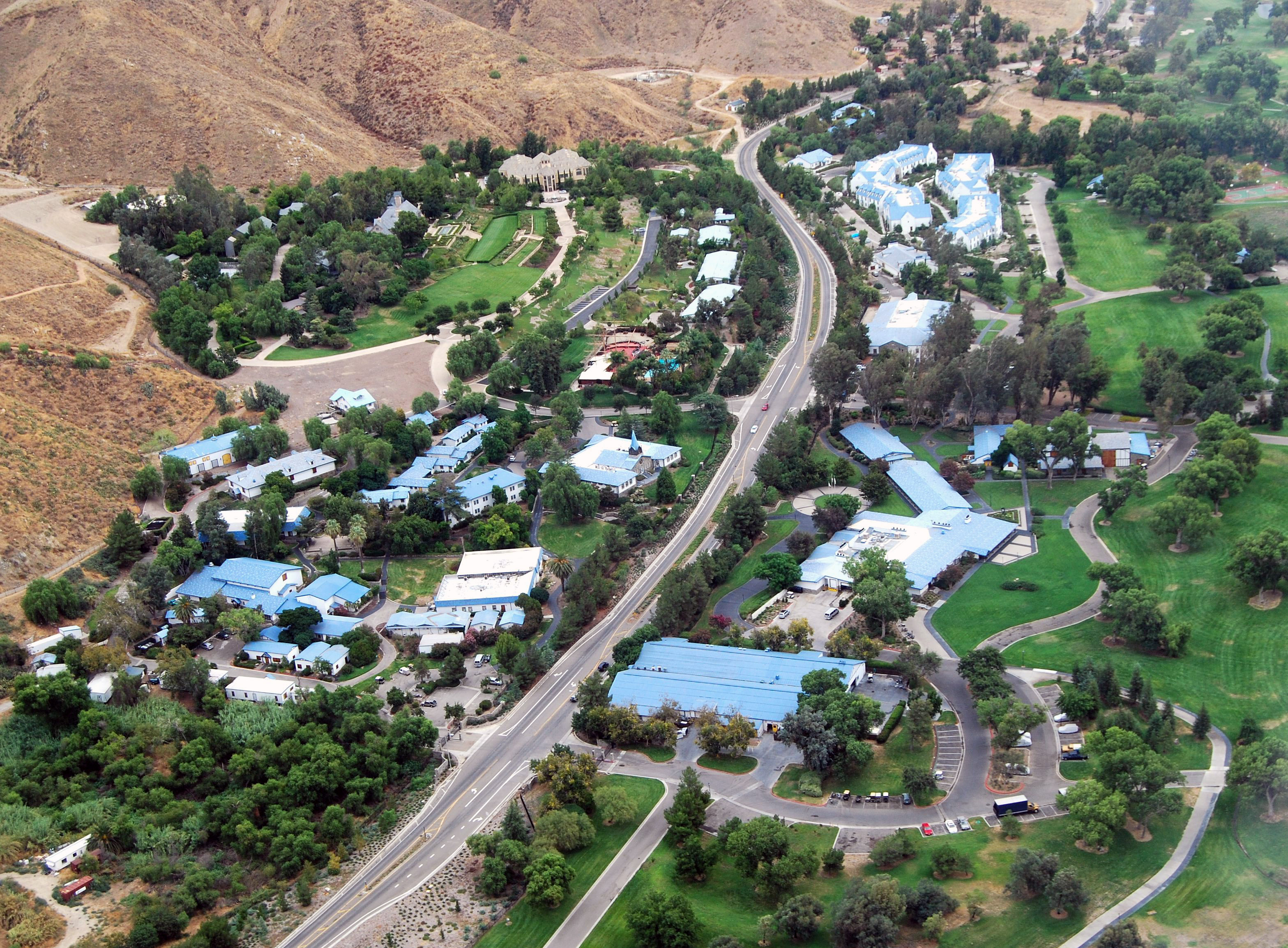
- Aerial view of Gold Base from the west

General information
- Location: 19625 & 19750 Gilman Springs Rd, Gilman Hot Springs, San Jacinto, Riverside County, California
- Coordinates: 33.8335°N 116.9869°W
- Construction started: 1978
- Owner: Church of Scientology

Dimensions
- Other dimensions: 520 acres (2.1 km^{2})

Gold Base (also variously known as Gold, Golden Era Productions, Int Base or Int) is the de facto international headquarters of the Church of Scientology, located north of San Jacinto, California, United States, about 85 miles (137 km) from Los Angeles. The heavily guarded compound comprises about fifty buildings surrounded by high fences topped with blades and watched around the clock by security personnel, cameras and motion detectors. The property is bisected by a public road, which is closely monitored by Scientology with cameras recording passing traffic.

The property had previously been a popular Inland Empire spa resort called Gilman Hot Springs, which was established in the 1890s. However, the resort went bankrupt in the late 1970s due to changes in American vacation habits. Bought for cash in 1978 by Scientology under the alias of the "Scottish Highland Quietude Club", it has since been developed and expanded considerably.

Gold Base houses numerous Scientology organizations and subsidiaries, including its in-house media production division, Golden Era Productions, which has its own movie studio on the site. Senior church officials, and up to 1,000 of the church's elite Sea Org live and work on the base; the church's leader, David Miscavige, also lived there until reportedly relocating to Clearwater, Florida, in the late 2010s. It is also the location of a $10 million mansion built for Scientology founder L. Ron Hubbard. Although he never lived there before his death in 1986, the mansion and his living quarters are still maintained in anticipation of his predicted reincarnation. A number of prominent Scientologists have visited the base, notably Tom Cruise.

According to some former members of Scientology, conditions within Gold Base are harsh, with staff members receiving sporadic paychecks of $50 at most, working seven days a week, and being subjected to punishments for failing to meet work quotas. Media reports have stated that around 100 people a year try to escape from the base but most are soon retrieved by "pursuit teams". Despite many accounts of mistreatment from ex-members, law enforcement investigations and lawsuits against Scientology have been thwarted by the First Amendment's guarantee of religious freedom and the church's ability to rely on "ministerial exemptions" in employment law. Scientology denies any mistreatment and calls the base "the ideal setting for professional and spiritual growth".

== Description ==
Gold Base is located at the base of California's San Jacinto Mountains. The base covers an area of 520-acre (2.1 km^{2}) near 19712 Gilman Springs Road, south-east of its intersection with California State Route 79, in unincorporated Riverside County, about 4 miles (6.4 km) north-northwest of San Jacinto and Hemet. It consists of compounds on either side of Gilman Springs Road with underground pedestrian tunnels connecting them. Both parts of the property are surrounded by a chain link fence topped with "Ultra Barrier" spikes and razor wire, with motion sensors and lights. There are five heavily guarded gates into the base, three on the south side of Gilman Spring Road and two on the north.

Scientology spokesperson Catherine Fraser told the Valley Chronicle newspaper in 2009 that the spikes on the fences were intended to "prevent people and animals from intruding." When asked why half the spikes face inwards towards the interior of the compound (as pictured below), Scientology spokesperson Tommy Davis told KESQ-TV that "that's just how they were installed".

Security at Gold Base
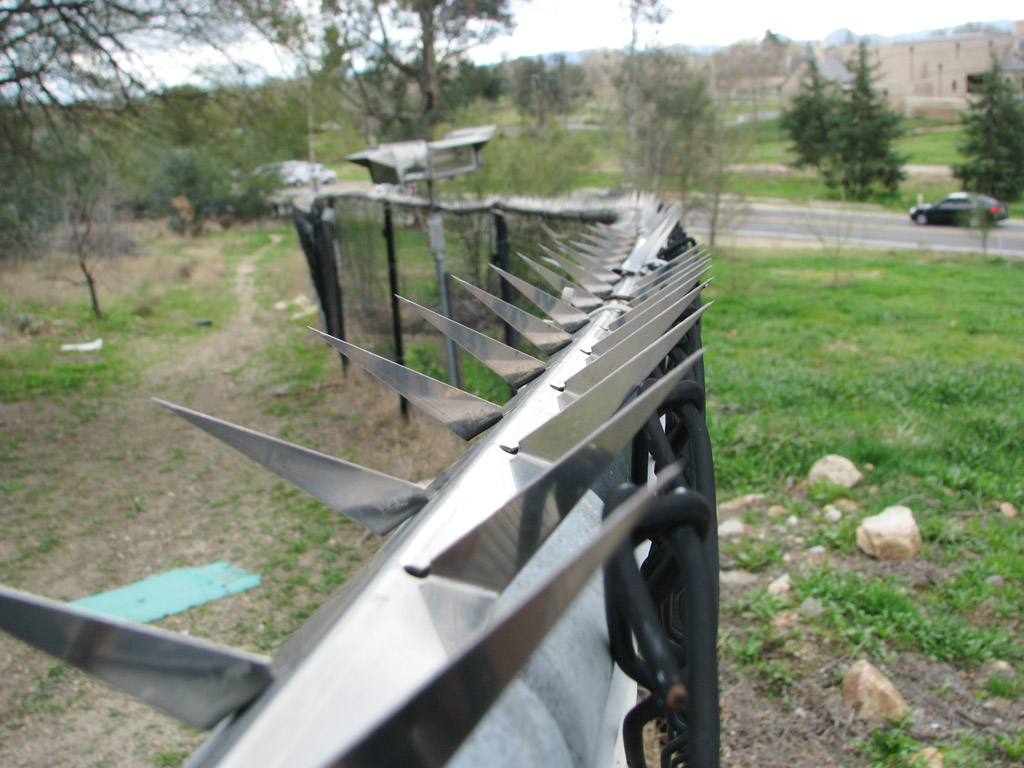
"Ultra Barrier" bladed fences at Gold Base.

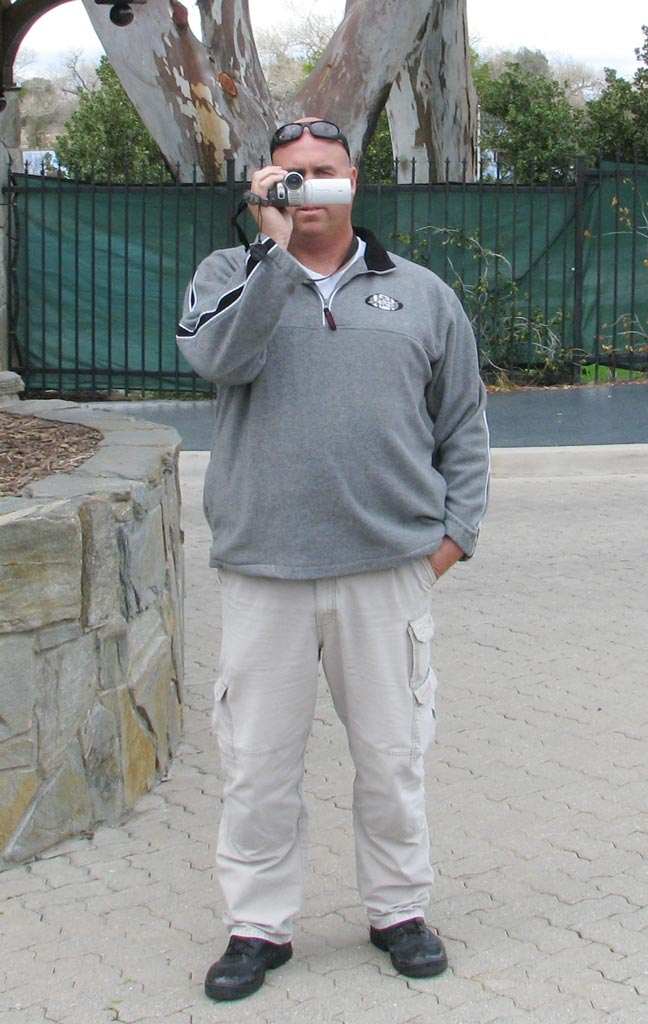
A security guard videotaping the photographer.

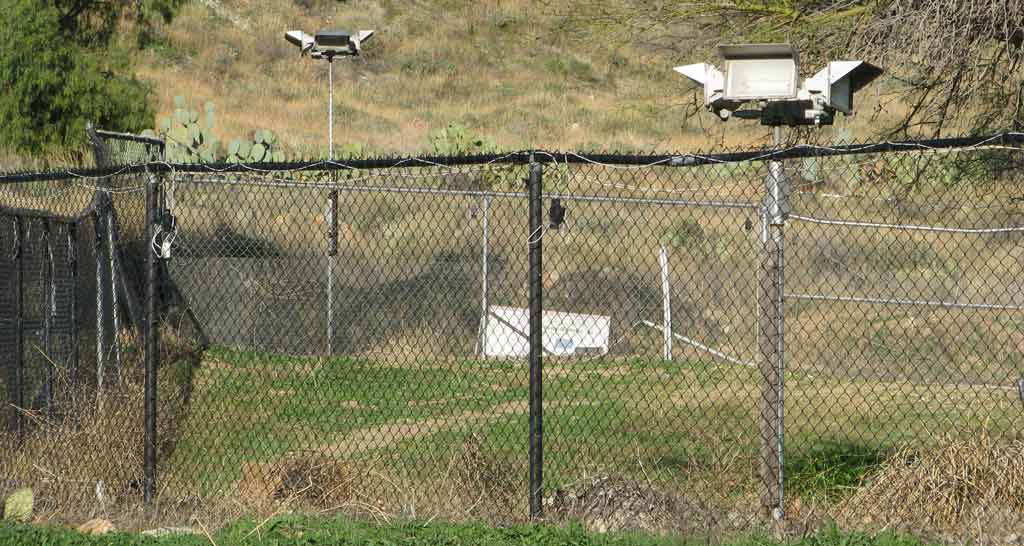
Fencing at Gold Base showing motion-activated lights.

There are around fifty buildings on the property, many built in a mock-Scottish highlands style. Most are obscured from public view by tall hedges and high walls, monitored by video cameras. According to the Riverside Press-Enterprise, Scientology employees in uniform and guards on motorcycles can be glimpsed by motorists through the metal fence that surrounds the compound. Although the road which goes through the middle of the compound is public property, the church has video cameras and lights installed adjacent to traffic signs to record traffic heading in both directions.

=== South side ===
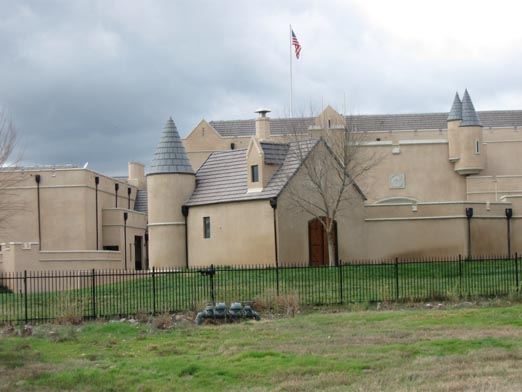
The exterior of "The Castle", the film studio built at Gold Base in 1997–98 in the style of a Scottish castle

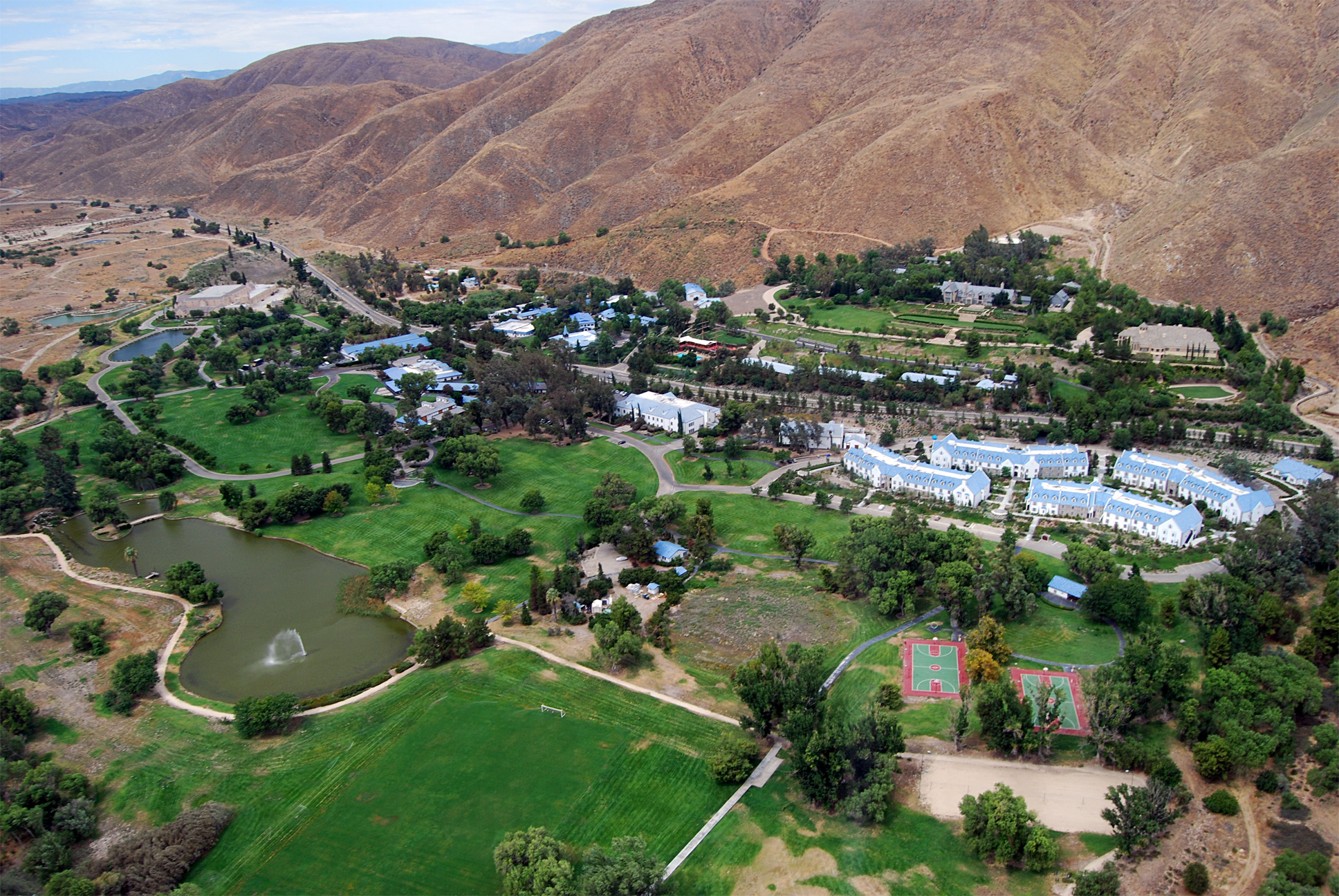
The south side of Gold Base. The blue-roofed Staff Berthing buildings are prominent at the right, with the Golden Era Production buildings on the left side. The sports facilities and lake are visible in the foreground.

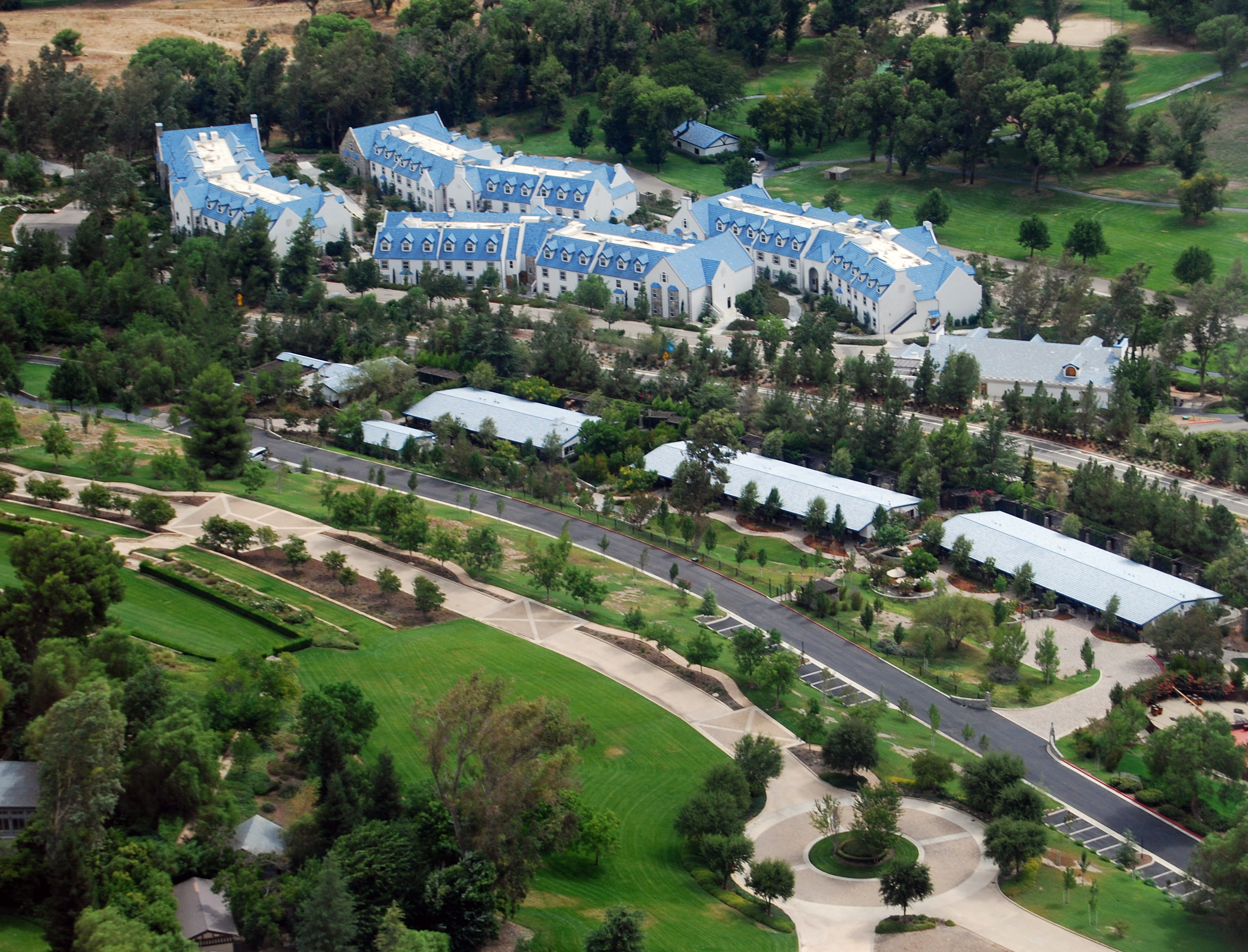
Staff housing at Gold Base: executive villas in the foreground, Staff Berthing buildings in the background.

The south side of Gold Base is primarily used by Golden Era Productions, Scientology's in-house movie studio. It includes a 74,000-square-foot (6,900 m^{2}) studio in the style of a Scottish castle, which was built in 1997–1998 at a cost of $10.8 million to serve as a production facility for Scientology's training and promotional videos. The building, known as the "Cine Castle", replaced an earlier building known as "The Gym" which used to house Golden Era's shooting stage, make-up, costumes, camera, lighting and set sound departments.

The name of the Gym is said to have come from the cover story used by Scientology to conceal its activities at the base. According to Marc Headley, who worked on the base for fifteen years; "the permit to build the studio was applied for under the guise of a 'basketball gym.' All references to the building were to be specified as the 'Gym'." The Gym still stands and is now reported to be used as a small (supplementary) studio and special effects facility.

A short distance to the east, a garage formerly used as a public gas station is now the location of Motor Pool Gold and serves as the maintenance facility for the entire property. The base's Estates Division, responsible for maintenance and construction work, is located here. The western part of the building was formerly used by Golden Era's set and props departments before the construction of the Cine Castle. In the 2000s, the garage was reportedly used to house a makeshift shower for the inmates of "The Hole", a punishment facility on the base.

Various buildings are located nearby for use in connection with the studio's administrative and production activities. Scientology's E-meters are manufactured on the base in a building known as Building 36, which houses production facilities for HEM (Hubbard E-Meter Manufacturing). It also houses tape production facilities and Golden Era's administrative functions.

A number of "Staff Berthing" blocks are located a few hundred yards away, housing around 1,000 members of Scientology's Sea Org. In keeping with the base's Scottish theme, each building is named after a different Scottish clan and bears its crest. The "G Units" – VIP accommodations – are situated on the far eastern edge of the base. Tom Cruise is reported to have stayed there in the late 1980s and early 1990s when he was studying Scientology at the base. Tunnels allow crossing from the Staff Berthing and Massacre Canyon Inn buildings to the north side of the base without having to exit the compound.

The rest of the southern part of the complex is a landscaped open area with a lake and sports facilities, including basketball and volleyball courts and a baseball diamond. As of 2008, they were reported to be disused. The lake was reportedly used for punishment on various occasions in the 2000s. According to author Janet Reitman, Scientology leader David Miscavige ordered dozens of senior executives to go outdoors in the middle of the night and assemble at either the lake or the base's open-air swimming pool. They would then jump or be pushed into the water, often in freezing conditions, while fully clothed and with Miscavige watching. Scientology acknowledges this practice took place but characterizes it as part of its "ecclesiastical justice" system for dealing with poor performance.

A "Purification Center" stands near the lake and is used to administer Scientology's Purification Rundown program to base staff. Nearby is a circular feature which has been used for the "running program", used as a punishment. Vicki Aznaran, formerly the president of Scientology's Religious Technology Center, alleged that after she disagreed with a plan to restructure the Church's finances in 1982, she was ordered to run around an orange pole every day from 7 am to 9:30 pm for about 120 days, with ten-minute breaks every half-hour and thirty-minute rests for lunch and dinner.

=== North side ===
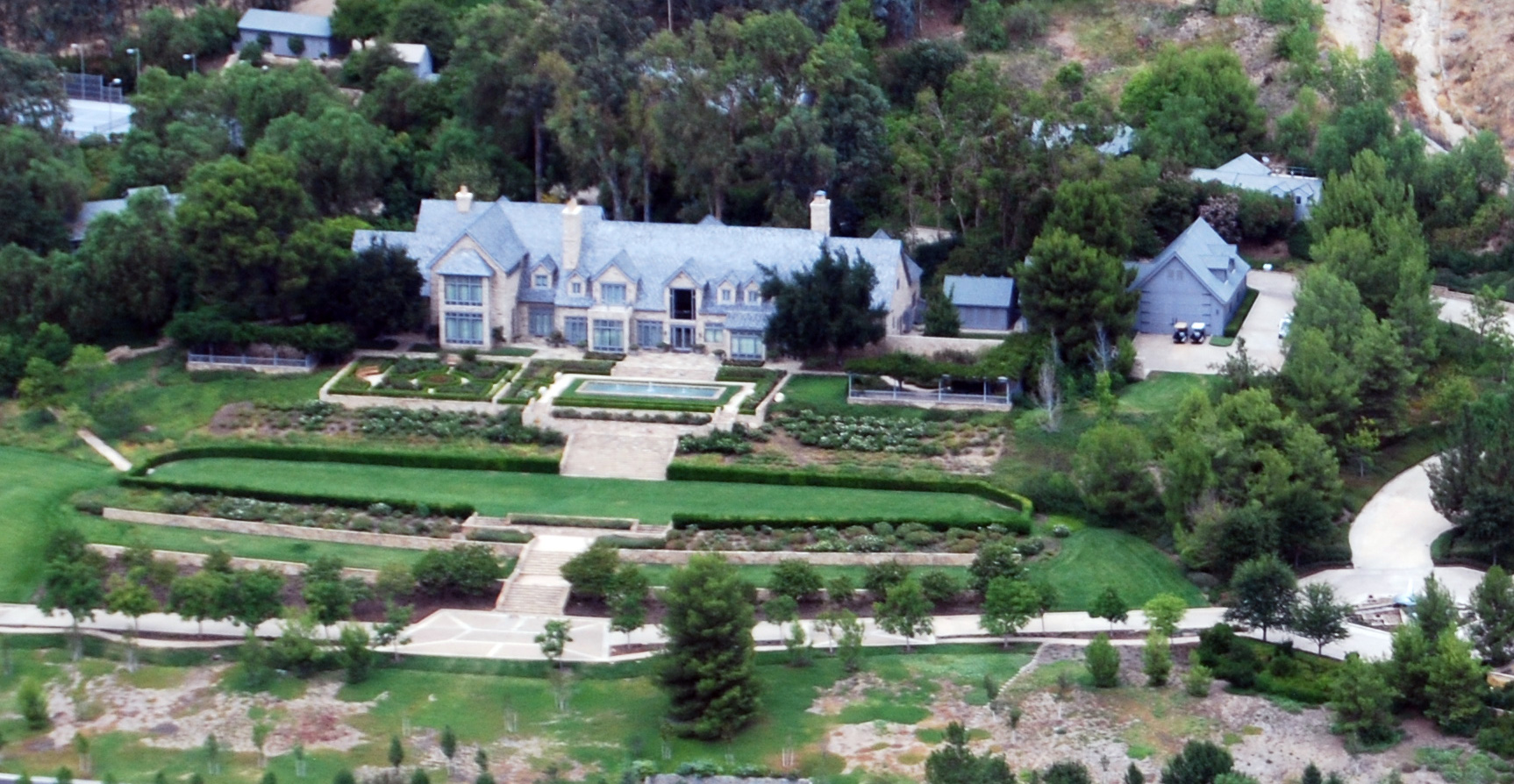
"Bonnie View", Hubbard's $9.4 million mansion at Gold Base. Although he never used it before his death in 1986, his clothes, cars and offices are still maintained, reportedly in anticipation of his reincarnation.

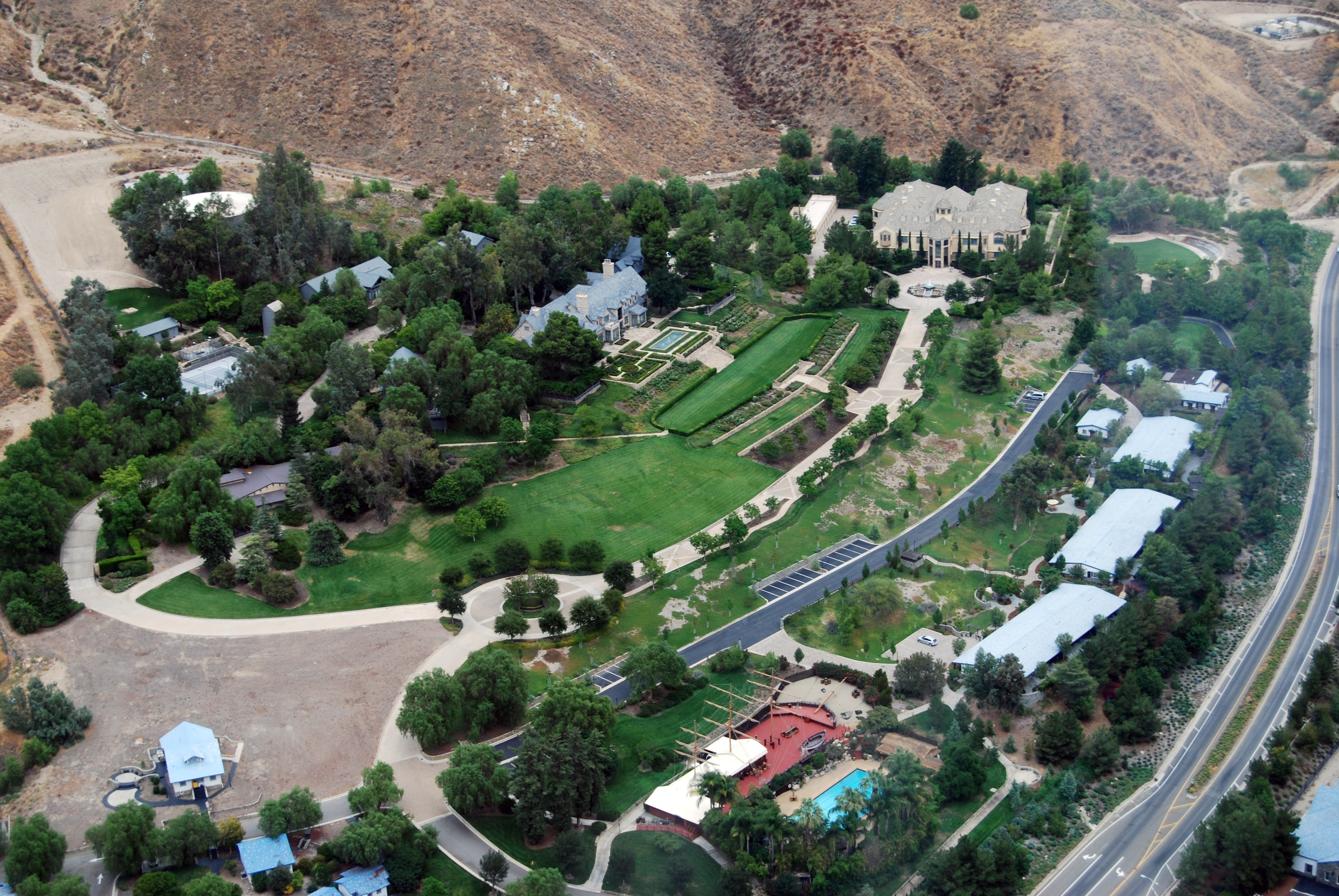
The north side of Gold Base showing "Bonnie View" and the RTC Building, with the Star of California and the Villas below.

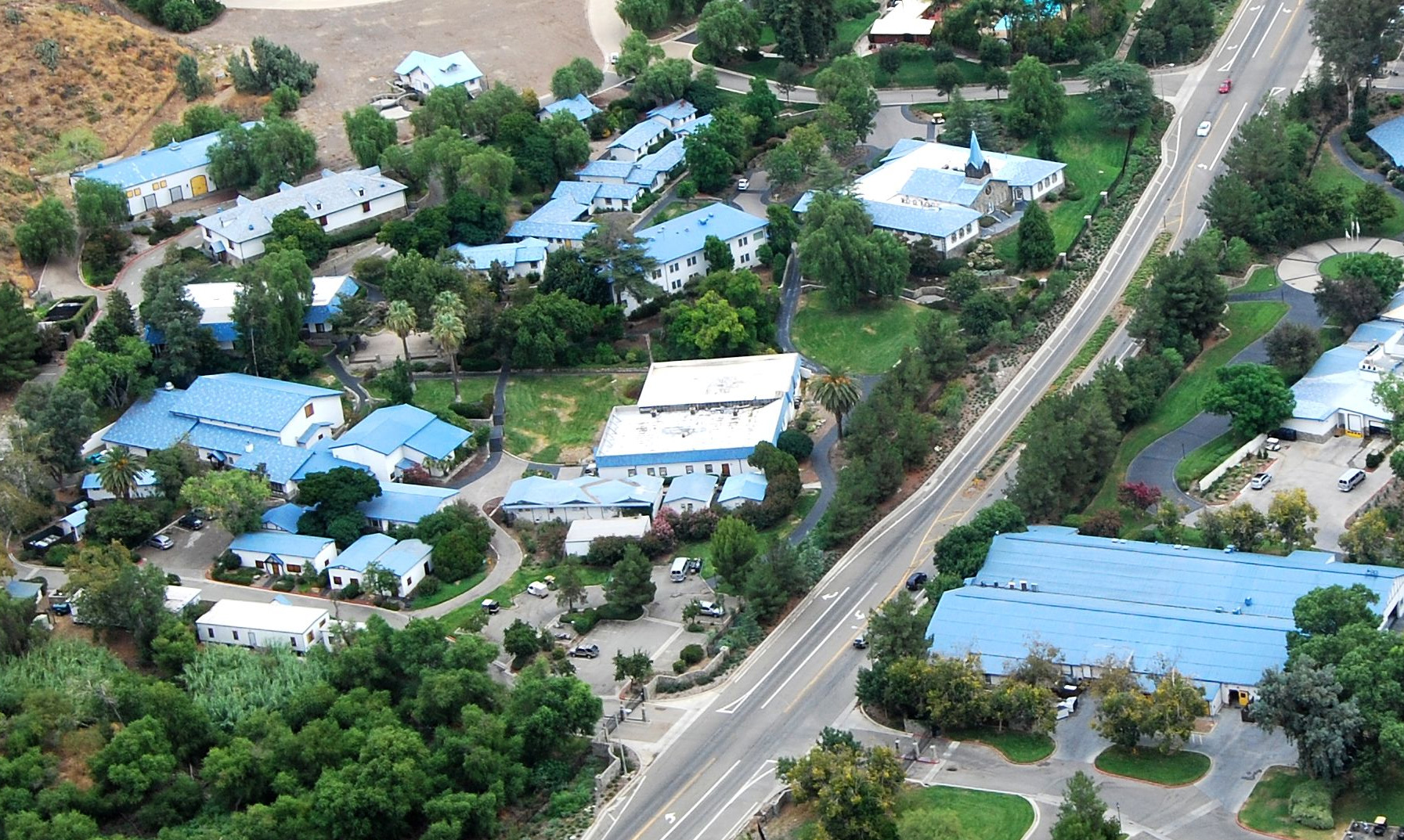
A view of the Gold Base management buildings. The Hole is the white-roofed building in the center foreground adjoining the highway.

Scientology's international management is based on the north side of Gold Base. Scientology founder L. Ron Hubbard's mansion, "Bonnie View", occupies a prominent spot on high ground with panoramic views of the San Jacinto Valley. According to property records, the residence cost $9.4 million and is equipped with a lap pool and a movie theater. It has been described as "high-end beautiful but not ostentatious", but Hubbard died long before it was completed. According to ex-Scientologists, it is meant to be used by Hubbard when he returns after being reincarnated. It is used in part as a museum, housing most of Hubbard's belongings.

Bonnie View is still maintained as if Hubbard is due to turn up tomorrow, with glasses of water covered with plastic wrap, toothbrushes set out in multiple personal bathrooms and "identical sets of Thom McAn black thongs ready for him to step into after a shower or bath." A full-time staff regularly launders Hubbard's clothes and cleans the property. His cars are kept in a garage with full tanks of gas and the keys in the ignition, ready to be used at a moment's notice. The rear of the house incorporates guest apartments and amenities which have reportedly been used by Tom Cruise on some of his visits to the base.

Adjacent to Bonnie View is the RTC Building, the headquarters of the Religious Technology Center chaired by Miscavige, who succeeded Hubbard as the church's leader. The 45,000-square-foot (4,200 m^{2}) building, which was completed in 2004, is said to have cost over $70 million to construct. According to Tom de Vocht, who was put in charge of completing construction after it fell years behind schedule and vastly overbudget, the RTC Building had been already completed twice over at a cost of over $47 million – $1,200 per square foot – but on each occasion the entire interior had to be ripped out as it did not meet with Miscavige's approval. De Vocht discovered the building had been so shoddily built that it would have collapsed during even a minor earthquake. The walls were not connected to the floors; the building had a 1.25-inch (3.2 cm) tilt; and there were no architectural drawings, only renderings of how it should appear. De Vocht was ordered to rebuild it, which cost a further $23 million. Millions more had to be spent on landscaping after Miscavige decreed the building, which is situated in the middle of the Californian desert, should appear to be set in a forest.

Three villas left over from the old resort, known as the Upper, Middle and Lower Villas, stand below Bonnie View. They have been used as executive apartments by Miscavige and other senior figures. Alongside the Villas is the Star of California, a replica clipper ship now used as a site for community events. Other buildings located nearby include the "Ranchos", a cluster of buildings used to house the book compilation, editing, design and typesetting units; the "Del Sol" building (formerly the Hotel Del Sol) used for staff training; and various additional facilities for Golden Era Productions.

One of these buildings, known as "Studio One", houses the "LRH [L. Ron Hubbard] Music Studio Complex" with state-of-the-art music recording facilities. Headley describes it as containing "very upscale conference and dining facilities for visiting musicians that are brought up to the Studio for recordings." Another studio on the north side, known as "Studio Two", houses additional audio production facilities.

A pair of double-wide trailers adjacent to the highway were installed to house Scientology's Central Marketing Unit (CMU) and various Golden Era technical facilities, and were later used as the offices of the Commodore's Messenger Org International (CMO Int) and the International Executive Strata (Exec Strata). They have since become known as "The Hole", where up to 100 senior Scientology executives have reportedly been confined in "degrading conditions" since 2004. A building known as "The Spa", which used to be the center of the old spa resort that existed on the property before Scientology acquired it, is now used by the base's Qualifications Division.

At the extreme west end of the north part of Gold Base was a compound within the compound, physically separated from the rest by chain fencing. A building called "OGH" (Old Gilman House, named after the family who built the old resort and lived in the house) was located here. It was reportedly used as a detention facility where staff were kept under guard while being "handled" or prepared for "offloading" (expulsion). Some who were reported to live there had been permanently forbidden to leave the base. OGH has since been demolished, its purpose now being served by the Hole. On the hillside above the base is a heavily camouflaged "sniper-style nest bunker" called Eagle that overlooks the entire property and the surrounding area. It was reportedly used as a lookout post where security staff with telescopes noted the license plate numbers of vehicles that lingered too long near the compound.

=== Golf course ===
The Golden Era Golf Course is located to the east of the main part of the base, south of the highway and outside the main boundary fence. It was built between 1988 and 1991 on the site of the resort's original golf course. It was open to the public between 1991 and 2007 but is now a private golf course. Although it is used for charitable golfing tournaments and other community events, base staff are reportedly not allowed to use it.

== History ==
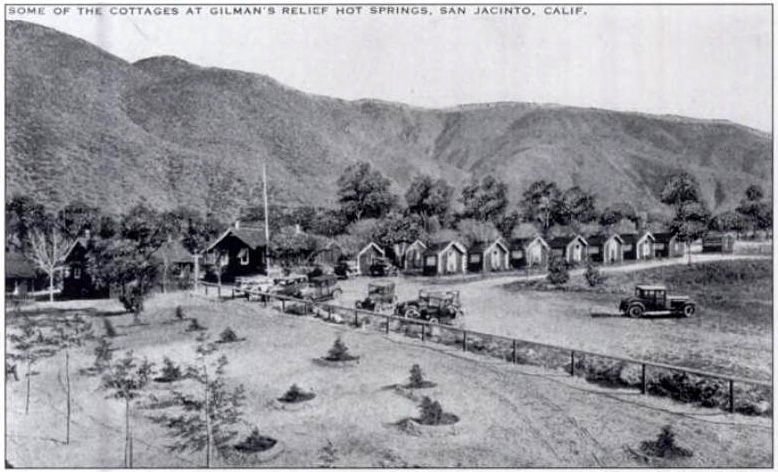
Cottages at Gilman's Relief Hot Springs, 1920

The Gilman Hot Springs property on which Gold Base sits was originally known as San Jacinto Hot Springs and contained about half a dozen hot springs named for the Mexican land grant Rancho San Jacinto Viejo. The springs were first developed in the late 1800s into a resort called Relief Hot Springs. The Gilman brothers acquired the property in 1913 and operated it for 65 years under the name Gilman Relief Hot Springs and later Gilman Hot Springs. Along with Soboba Hot Springs and Eden Hot Springs, it was one of three early 20th-century resorts near San Jacinto that offered vacationers the opportunity to relax, bathe in, and drink hot mineral waters bubbling up from the San Jacinto Fault, an offshoot of the San Andreas Fault. Changing vacation habits and a decline of public interest in mineral waters meant that Gilman Hot Springs was no longer a viable business by the late 1970s; it went bankrupt and the property was sold in 1978.

=== Acquisition by the Church of Scientology (1978) ===
In 1978, L. Ron Hubbard authorized the purchase of the property to serve as a headquarters. It was acquired in conditions of extraordinary secrecy. $2.7 million in cash was paid by the new owners, who called themselves the "Scottish Highland Quietude Club". A Los Angeles attorney named Richard Hoag, acting for the owners, said that the resort had been purchased for a condominium project. The money for the purchase was fronted by the "November 1, 1978 Private Trust", a secret trust of which Hoag served as the trustee.

According to Scientology defector Silvia Garritano, "Hubbard disguised his operation at Gilman Hot Springs as the 'Hoag Scholarship Foundation'. The idea was to convince local businessmen that ... Hoag owned the place and that he conducted a program designed to help young people learn trades and skills. Hubbard's purpose was to conceal from public scrutiny the management level of Scientology." Hoag himself was unaware of the identity of the buyer and said later: "I think they really didn't want people to know because it was controversial."

Scientology spokesman Heber Jentzsch told the Riverside Press-Enterprise that he had "no information" of any Scientology involvement with the former resort. Other spokesmen for the trust that bought the property claimed that it had been purchased by "wealthy Eastern investors" or wealthy investors from the Palm Springs area. The Riverside County Sheriff's Office took an interest after it was rumoured that pornographic films were being made there or that an organized crime group had taken over the resort, but the property was hurriedly vacated before an official investigation could begin.

Signs posted at the entrance to the property did not mention Scientology. One, erected in the fall of 1979, attributed ownership to the "Western States Scientific Communications Association" while another, replacing the first in April 1980, proclaimed: "Massacre Canyon Development Co. – Future sites condominiums and homes." A man calling himself "Dan Pook" met with local civic groups to explain the condominium project, telling residents in March 1980 that the site was to be used for the construction of "condominiums, mobile homes and single-family residences". He was later identified as Ronald Pook, a Scientology public relations official responsible for disseminating "shore stories" (or cover stories) about the church's plans for the property.

The intense secrecy was due to Scientology's acute legal difficulties at the time. Scientology was embroiled in scandal after Hubbard's wife Mary Sue and a number of other Scientologists had been arrested by the FBI the previous year and charged with running an enormous espionage network, Operation Snow White, against the U.S. government. Hubbard himself was named as an "unindicted co-conspirator". He went into hiding in a desert ranch in La Quinta, which was codenamed "W" (for "winter headquarters"). Gilman Hot Springs was similarly codenamed "S", for "summer headquarters". The La Quinta property was closed down in March 1978 and Hubbard moved to an apartment complex in Hemet, codenamed "X".

Hubbard's personal staff, known as the Commodore's Messengers, shuttled between "X" and "S" using various counter-surveillance methods to shake off anyone tracking them: switching between locations, using secret meeting points, relaying information covertly, using aliases and so on. Nobody was allowed to travel directly between the two locations but had to make indirect trips of up to 120 miles. Hubbard himself was at the centre of an elaborate security system with buzzers and red lights to warn him if strangers turned up. Staff were drilled to deny any knowledge of Hubbard and maintained a getaway car for him that was accessible through a garage that opened onto a different street. The existence of Gilman Hot Springs was kept secret even from other Scientologists. Staff members on the base were not allowed to make telephone calls or to send mail directly. If they did get permission to use the telephone, they were instructed to say that they were calling from Clearwater, Florida, where Scientology's Flag Land Base is located.

Hubbard did not live at Gilman Hot Springs but ordered that Bonnie View, a Tudor-style house on the property, should be renovated for his use. He instructed that it was to be "dust-free, defensible" and that high walls with "openings for gun emplacements" were to be constructed around it. Scientologists who had been posted to the Rehabilitation Project Force (RPF) – a kind of punishment unit – were made to carry out the work of redecorating the house and ensuring that it was free of dust and odors. The original house was eventually torn down and rebuilt but the new construction was not finished until 2000, long after Hubbard's death in January 1986.

=== Development of the site ===
In February 1980, Press-Enterprise reporter Dick Lyneis broke the story that Hubbard was living in Hemet and working at Gilman Hot Springs. The disclosure caused Hubbard to flee Hemet and sparked a panic at the base, which Scientology spokesman Robert Vaughn Young was sent in to resolve. He decided to present what Scientology would call an "acceptable truth", turning a small, shut-down film and audio unit at the compound into a working facility called Golden Era Studios which could be presented to the press as the "real" function of the base. The conversion happened overnight:

Through that night and into the morning, the facility was converted. I had the paper covering all the windows taken off. Everything was cleaned. Equipment and desks were rearranged to hide certain tasks and to create others. Tapes, films, scripts, and costumes were dragged out and made obvious. Many international management staff were sent off the base to reduce the number of personnel.

The next day, the "Scottish Highland Quietude Club" had become Golden Era Studios. A media tour went without a hitch. The tape-production area wasn't cranking yet, but I did get people busy making costumes and booklets or doing artwork. We found a makeshift studio that "just happened" to be working when the tour came through. Asked about "international management," I said yes, they did manage distribution of films and tapes, which did go to churches worldwide. No one noticed I had avoided the question and diverted attention to the film and tape production.

The news that night was perfect. The Riverside Press-Enterprise story had been countered. Gilman was no longer considered the headquarters of Scientology. It was just a bustling film and tape facility that supplied the Church of Scientology.

After the "flap" had died down, Scientology's international management staff moved back onto the base and have remained there ever since. The tight security remained, nonetheless; the Boston Globe noted that "curious, unannounced visitors are quickly surrounded by guards, photographed, asked for identification, then urged to leave. Before they do, the license plate numbers on their cars are jotted down for good measure."

The jailing of Mary Sue Hubbard on conspiracy charges in 1981 set off a power struggle within Scientology that was won by the Commodore's Messenger Organization, a group of mostly young Scientologists – many of them teenagers, some as young as ten years old – which took over Scientology by the end of 1981. That year a body called the All Clear Unit was set up at Gilman Hot Springs under the management of the then 21-year-old David Miscavige. Its purpose was to make it "All Clear" for Hubbard to come out of hiding. They were sufficiently confident of success that, in 1982, a mock ship called the Star of California was built at the property as a present to the nautically minded Hubbard, constructed at a reported cost of $500,000. Scientology was able to reduce costs by using its own staff as labor, paying them less than $20 for a 100-hour work week.

In February 1988, Scientology won permission from the Riverside County Planning Commission to rebuild the golf course at Gilman Hot Springs. Scientology's application was opposed by many area residents, who were concerned about the disruption that the development would cause. The commission's public meeting was packed by nearly 200 people, mostly Scientologists wearing lapel buttons supporting the church's expansion and renovation program. Scientology also disclosed plans to construct additional studios, offices, storage buildings, housing and recreational facilities, as well as renovating 35 existing buildings to bring them up to required standards. Scientology was given a year to complete the golf course, but it was only reopened in 1991.

Since 1998, Scientology has spent at least $45 million expanding Gold Base and acquiring dozens of nearby homes and vacant lots. According to an April 2011 map published by the Press-Enterprise, the Church now owns almost all of the land on either side of Gilman Springs Road from the intersection with Sanderson Avenue to the road's terminus at State Street, a total distance of 2.32 miles (3.73 km). Scientology says that it intends to expand the golf course but has not yet developed any specific plans.

Scientology has also undertaken a considerable amount of community outreach to improve its relationship with its neighbors. Gold Base has hosted Chamber of Commerce events and has allowed the local high school band to use its recording studio. Fishing tournaments for children have been held at the compound's lake and local dignitaries have been invited to liaise with base staff.

The section of Gilman Springs Road that bisects the two parts of the base has undergone major changes at the behest of Scientology. Until the early 1990s, the two parts of the base were accessed via gates on either side of the highway. This presented safety and security problems; moving hundreds of people across the road at mealtimes posed a hazard to traffic. These issues were tackled by building pedestrian tunnels under the road for staff to use and rebuilding the configuration of the road to narrow it and slow down traffic. However, a number of accidents have subsequently occurred on that section of road. In 2001, a 16-year-old girl was decapitated by a tractor operated by a Golden Era contractor who was operating it without a valid driver's license. In 2011, a man was killed in a head-on collision outside the compound.

=== Demonstrations and controversy ===
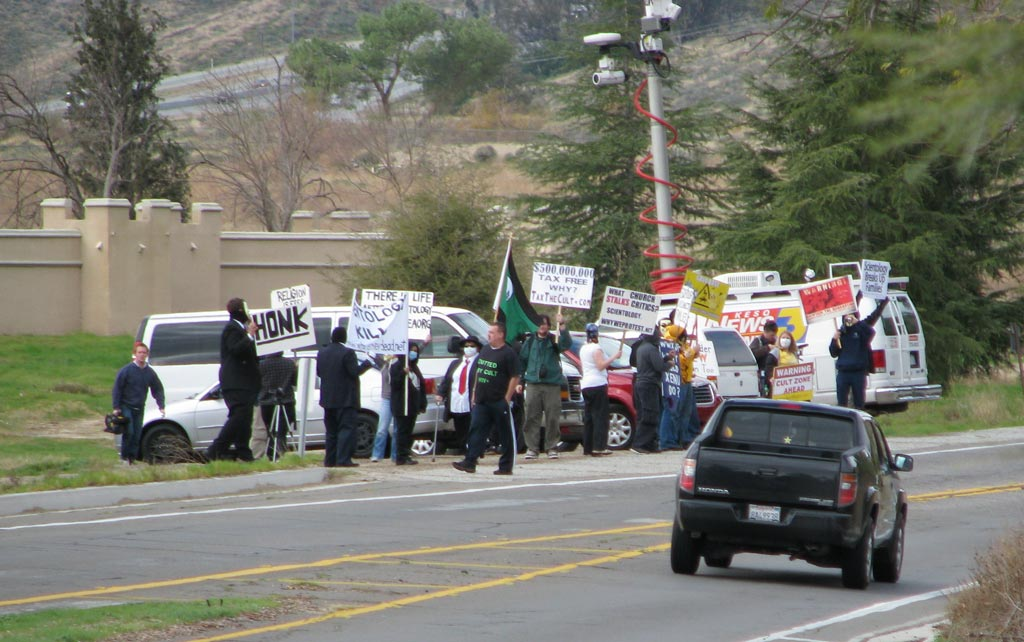
Protesters outside Gold Base in January 2009

A former church executive testified in 1994 that church money was set aside at Gold Base for HK91s, 45s, shotguns, ammo and gunpowder, and that "motorcycle guards were trained to carry loaded cocked 45 caliber pistols."

Anti-Scientology demonstrators began picketing Gold Base in 1997, prompting litigation from Scientology against one protester, Keith Henson. A Scientology bid to impose a temporary restraining order on Henson was overturned in February 1998 when Judge Stephen D. Cunnison of Riverside Superior Court ruled that Henson was legitimately exercising his right to free speech. He told Scientology's attorney, Kendrick Moxon: "You don't have a situation here where the defendant is stopping people. This is not an abortion clinic situation." Moxon complained that Henson's one-man demonstration was threatening the safety of Golden Era employees and motorists along the state highway. Henson was later convicted of a misdemeanor charge arising out of a demonstration at the base and was sentenced to 180 days in jail.

Members of the hacktivist group Anonymous picketed Gold Base in November 2008. The demonstration was held outside the property but prompted clashes between Scientology guards and demonstrators which were recorded on video. As giant loudspeakers in the base broadcast noise to drown out the demonstrators, guards tackled one demonstrator to the ground and tripped another one with a leg sweep. Scientologists told Riverside County Sheriff's deputies that the first demonstrator had bitten one of them and that he was guilty of trespassing on private land. Scientology subsequently lobbied county authorities to ban the demonstrations. At a public hearing in December 2008 the Riverside County Supervisor, Jeff Stone, accused the protesters of "oppressing Jews, Christians and black people and encouraging youth suicide and terrorism." County supervisors approved a proposal, fast-tracked by Stone, to impose restrictions barring picketers from approaching within 300 feet (91 m) of a targeted residence.

Stone did not disclose at the time that his political fund had received a $5,400 donation from the law firm that represented Scientology at the hearing, and another $600 from the head of the public relations department at Gold Base. After the donations were disclosed, he was fined $16,000 by the California Fair Political Practices Commission for failing to properly report $84,052 in contributions. The measure, known as Ordinance 884, was adopted in March 2009 but attracted controversy for what critics said were its unconstitutional restrictions on free speech. The distance was eventually reduced to 30 feet (9.1 m) and then to just 3 metres (9.8 ft) after county supervisors found that they had effectively banned their own existing practice of protesting against sex offenders living in the county.

In 2009, Scientology officials began lobbying to close Gilman Springs Road, which is used by about 17,000 cars daily. The request was opposed "under any circumstances" by the San Jacinto City Council. Scientology subsequently backed a proposal to realign the road to go around the base, but a decision was put off indefinitely by the Riverside County Board of Supervisors after discussions in January 2011.

== Life at Gold Base ==
=== At the bottom ===
Scientology maintains strict criteria for those living and working at Gold Base. Many are the children of high-ranking Scientologists, including some of Hubbard's own children and grandchildren. According to author Janet Reitman, those seeking to be assigned to Gold Base had to be members of the Sea Org. They were required to undergo IQ tests and pass a battery of leadership, personality and security tests. Members with family connections to the government or media, or with any friends or family who had left Scientology on bad terms, were not allowed to work there. They were not allowed to disclose the location of the base or to discuss their jobs or activities there with anyone outside the base, even fellow Sea Org members. They were also banned from taking any form of public transport or taxis, and instead had to travel on special Scientology buses or in private vehicles driven by approved staff members.

According to Marc and Claire Headley, two Scientologists who left the Church in 2005, residents at Gold Base are not permitted to leave without the permission of a supervisor and have to work at least sixteen hours a day, from 8 am to past midnight, with shorter hours on Sundays and little time for socializing. Communications with the outside world are effectively cut off; cellphones and Internet access are generally banned, while mail is censored and can only be sent via the internal mail system. Passports are kept in a locked filing cabinet.

Although this system was reportedly dropped around 2000, workers are still subject to a regime of privileges and punishments. Weekly pay is said to be only around $50, given out in cash on Fridays. This amount is only nominal, however, as fines for infractions are commonplace; according to author Lawrence Wright, the amount actually paid is often as little as $13 or $14 a week.

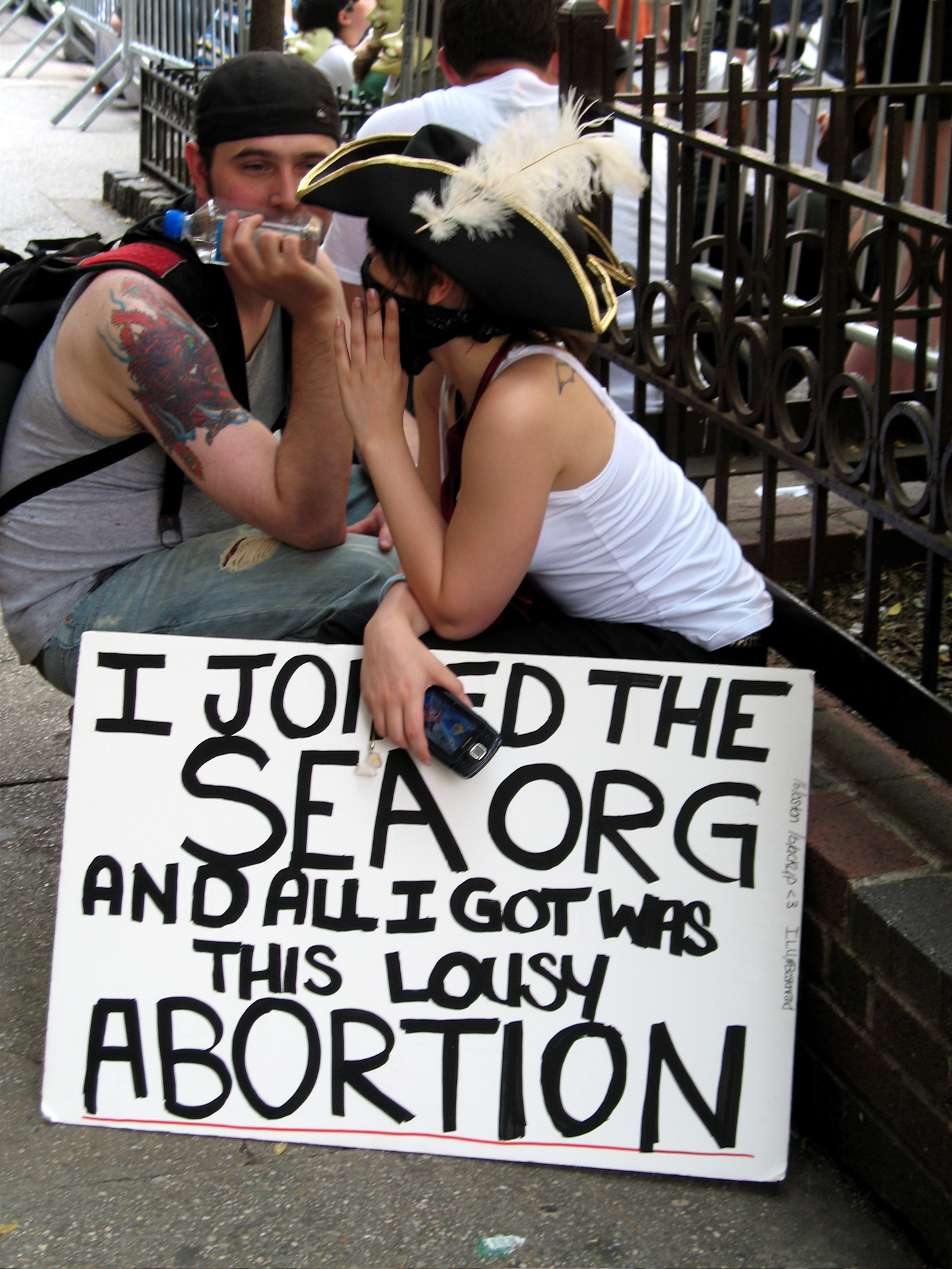
Demonstrators protesting against Sea Org abortions

Claire Headley describes how staff lived in constant paranoia due to being required to submit "knowledge reports" on each other if they heard any critical statements or casual asides. Becoming the subject of a report meant that the accused person was interrogated and made to recant or publicly confess their "crimes" against Scientology. Reitman comments that "everyone at the Int Base lived in fear of everyone else and what they might be saying, or reporting, about one another."

Food is basic, consisting of meat, potatoes and salad for those not being punished, or rice and beans for those who are. The average cost per meal, according to Marc Headley (who was involved with the financial planning), was only 75 cents per head in 2005 – significantly less than is spent on California prison inmates. Unmarried staff live in dormitories, while married couples share two-bedroom apartments with two other couples, meaning that one pair gets to spend each night sleeping on the couch. Many of those on the base are reported to have not left the property for over a decade. Scientology describes conditions at the base as being "like one would find in a convent or seminary, albeit much more comfortable."

In the mid-1980s, women with children under the age of six were banned from joining the Sea Org, as Scientology no longer wanted it to provide childcare for the very young. A new policy was formally enacted in 1996 which banned Sea Org members from having children at all, as they were seen as "interfering with the productivity" of the staff. Ex-Scientologists have said that they were pressured to terminate their pregnancies to comply with the policy. According to Claire Headley, somewhere between sixty and eighty percent of the women on the base had at least one abortion, with some claiming indigence to get the county to pay for the procedure. Reitman comments: "If a pregnant woman refused, she would be separated from her husband, put on heavy manual labor, and vigorously 'sec checked' [interrogated]. If she still refused to get an abortion, she would be sent from the base in disgrace, alone." Scientology has denied that it has pressured anyone into having an abortion and says that it does not consider pregnant women to be "degraded beings."

The Tampa Bay Times reports that dozens of workers tried to escape from the base – some of them repeatedly – but were caught and returned by Sea Org "pursuit teams". The odds are stacked against escapees, as the compound is located in the desert, there is only one road in either direction and the surrounding terrain is mountainous and barren, with plenty of scrub and rattlesnakes to hinder movement across country. Wright describes how one successful escapee, Guy White, managed to get away from the base in October 1988:

Each evening, he went for a stroll along the fence line, a little farther each time, carrying a snack for the German shepherd guard dogs. One night, he jumped the fence, but the dogs betrayed him and began barking. He had to dive off the road when he saw the lights of the blow team coming after him. For hours, he stumbled through the brush, bleeding, his clothes torn, until he made it to Hemet, where he pounded on the door of a bowling alley. In broken Spanish, he told the person who peeked out that he had been in a car wreck.

According to Reitman, whenever someone escapes or "blows", a special "blow drill" is launched to recover the escapee. The individual's files are combed to work out where they are likely to be headed, such as friends or family on the outside. "Blow teams" stake out bus and train stations, airports and hotels in the vicinity to intercept the runaway. Another method is to call hotels, motels and airlines in the guise of a sick relative to try to find out if the escapee is booked in for a flight or a stay. Although such information is supposed to be confidential, company privacy rules have been evaded by escalating the calls to an ever-higher level of seniority until an answer had been gotten. On one occasion reported by Wright, the vice-president of an airline was cajoled into giving up an escapee.

Some escapees were tracked down through their personal interests. Gary Morehead, who worked as the chief of security at Gold Base in the 1990s, cites the example of a senior executive who fled in 1992. The executive was known to be a baseball fan. A week later, Morehead caught him in the parking lot of Candlestick Park. If all else failed, according to Morehead, the homes of the blown member's friends and family were staked out by Scientologists using scanners to listen in on cordless phones and cell phones, and tracing the license plates of any vehicles that turned up.

Captured escapees are said to have been subjected to isolation, interrogation and punishment after being brought back to the compound. According to Wright, they often did not even argue when they were caught, knowing that they would have to spend months or even years being punished while working their way back into good standing.

For its part, Scientology says that the compound is "the ideal setting for professional and spiritual growth," where its members can focus on furthering Scientology's goals while avoiding the distractions of big-city life. It denies that blow drills exist.

=== At the top ===
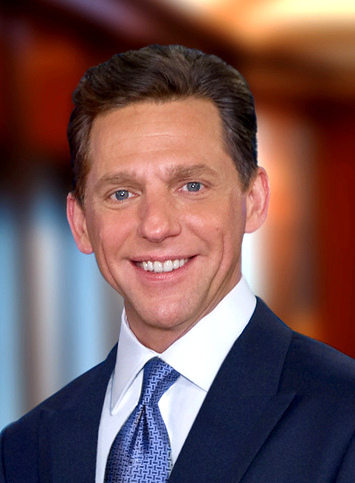
David Miscavige, the current leader of the Church of Scientology.

Compared to the conditions in which ordinary staff members work, life at Gold Base is reported to be more comfortable for Miscavige and celebrity Scientologists. Most staff are not permitted to have their own vehicles, but Miscavige was reported to have a customized Yamaha motorcycle which he rode around the base as well as a range of other vehicles, including a Mazda Miata roadster, a Range Rover luxury SUV and a high-performance BMW M6 as well as a custom-made armored GMC van equipped as a mobile office. According to Claire Headley, who managed Miscavige's finances from 2000 to 2004, his food costs ranged between $3,000 to $20,000 a week, with food flown in fresh from the East Coast or Canada. His villa at the base was said to have a $150,000 sound system and its own private screening room.

According to Wright, Miscavige is also a dog lover and has kept up to five dogs on Gold Base. They wear their own miniature Sea Org uniforms and hold the rank of captain. Staff are required to salute the dogs as they pass by. On April 30 each year, staff are encouraged to donate their back pay to buy a birthday present for Miscavige. One year he was given a $70,000 motorcycle; in other years, he received diving equipment, high-end cameras and Italian shoes. Church spokesman Tommy Davis has said that "from [the staff's] perspective, it was the least they could do to express their affection."

One of the most prominent VIP visitors to Gold Base is the Scientologist actor Tom Cruise, who first visited in August 1989 to have lunch with Miscavige aboard Star of California. Miscavige persuaded Cruise to do all of his Scientology training at the base, and thereafter Cruise began to commute between the base and Los Angeles by helicopter each weekend. Cruise was given his own VIP condo in a secluded area in the southern part of the base and was assigned his own valet and a personal chef, Sinar Parman, who had previously been Hubbard's cook. The condo was renovated in 1990 when Cruise began dating Nicole Kidman; on one occasion, Sea Org members were assigned to fill the place with balloons as a surprise for Kidman. Tennis courts were built nearby at a cost of $200,000 when the couple wanted to take up tennis.

Wright reports that when Miscavige heard that Cruise had a fantasy of running with Kidman through a meadow full of wildflowers, he ordered Sea Org members to plant an area of the desert. It failed to meet expectations, so it was plowed up and laid with grass instead. Another time, when a mudslide soiled their guest cabin, Miscavige held the entire base responsible for ruining the romantic idyll and ordered everyone to work sixteen-hour days to restore it to its former condition.

According to Jefferson Hawkins, Scientology's former marketing director, elaborate measures were taken to ensure that Cruise did not see what was going on elsewhere at Gold Base. He told KESQ-TV: "The staff is not allowed to talk to him. He's been given tours and I've been on the other end of those and they're very orchestrated. They're on walkie-talkies and they go, 'He's going into this building, he's going into that building.' They have certain staff set up and rehearsed in those spaces to give him a certain scripted talk."

=== Litigation ===
Attempts by law enforcement to investigate conditions at Gold Base have been blocked by legal difficulties and the unwillingness of those on the base to talk to the police. According to Wright, who wrote about the base in his 2013 book Going Clear: Scientology, Hollywood, and the Prison of Belief, the Riverside County Sheriff's Office has never received a complaint from anyone at the base about their treatment there, despite the many accounts of mistreatment. Wright attributes this to the fear that many Scientologists have of bringing shame upon the church and of being forced to break off contact with their friends and family members within the group.

A few people have brought complaints in the courts. In 2009, the Headleys sued Scientology under the federal Victims of Trafficking and Violence Protection Act of 2000 for their treatment at the base (Headley v. Church of Scientology International). Scientology acknowledged that the rules under which the Headleys lived included a ban on having children, censored mail, monitored phone calls, needing permission to have Internet access and being disciplined through manual labor. The Ninth Circuit Court of Appeals noted in a ruling given in July 2012 that Marc Headley had been made to clean human excrement by hand from an aeration pond on the compound with no protective equipment, while Claire Headley was banned from the dining hall for up to eight months in 2002. She lost 30 pounds (14 kg) as a result of subsisting on protein bars and water. In addition, she had two abortions to comply with the Sea Org's no-children policy. The Headleys both witnessed and experienced physical abuse from Scientology executives, including Miscavige himself.

But the Court also upheld the lower court's dismissal of Headleys' suit against Scientology, with this observation: "The act bars an employer from obtaining another's labor 'by means of' force, physical restraint, serious harm, threats or an improper scheme ... That text is a problem for the Headleys because the record contains little evidence that the defendants obtained the Headleys' labor 'by means of' serious harm, threats or other improper methods."

== Bibliography ==
- Atack, Jon (1990). A Piece of Blue Sky: Scientology, Dianetics and L. Ron Hubbard Exposed. Lyle Stuart Books. ISBN 081840499X. OL 9429654M.
- Headley, Marc (2009). Blown for Good: Behind the Iron Curtain of Scientology. BFG Books. ISBN 9780982502204.
- Lech, Steve (2005). Resorts of Riverside County. Arcadia Publishing. ISBN 9780738530789.
- Miscavige Hill, Jenna (2013). "Mom". Beyond Belief: My Secret Life Inside Scientology and My Harrowing Escape (Kindle ed.). William Morrow. ISBN 978-0062263438.
- Reitman, Janet (2011). Inside Scientology: The Story of America's Most Secretive Religion. Houghton Mifflin Harcourt. ISBN 9780618883028. OL 24881847M.
- Warneke, Jack; Holtzclaw, Kenneth M.; San Jacinto Valley Museum Association (2008). Images of America: San Jacinto. Arcadia Publishing. ISBN 9780738558424.
- Wright, Lawrence (2013). Going Clear: Scientology, Hollywood and the Prison of Belief. Alfred A. Knopf. ISBN 9780307700667. OL 25424776M.
