= Our Lady of Guadalupe School v. Morrissey-Berru =

Lady of Guadalupe School v. Morrissey-Berru
- Supreme Court of the United States

Argued May 11, 2020 Decided July 8, 2020
- Full case name: Our Lady of Guadalupe School v. Agnes Morrissey-Berru; St. James School v. Darryl Biel, as Personal Representative of the Estate of Kristen Biel
- Docket nos.: 19-267; 19-348
- Citations: 591 U.S. 732 (more) 140 S. Ct. 2049

Case history
- Prior: Summary judgment granted, Morrissey-Berru v. Our Lady of Guadalupe Sch., No. 2:16-cv-09353, 2017 WL 6527336 (C.D. Cal. Sept. 27, 2017); reversed and remanded, 769 F. App'x 460 (9th Cir. 2019); cert. granted, 140 S. Ct. 679 (2019); Summary judgment granted, Biel v. St. James Sch., No. 2:15-cv-04248, 2017 WL 5973293 (C.D. Cal. Jan. 24, 2017); reversed and remanded, 911 F.3d 603 (9th Cir. 2018); cert. granted, 140 S. Ct. 680 (2019)

Holding
- The First Amendment ministerial exception extends to the adjudication of Morrissey-Berru's and Biel's employment-discrimination claims.

Court membership
- Chief Justice John Roberts Associate Justices Clarence Thomas · Ruth Bader Ginsburg; Stephen Breyer · Samuel Alito; Sonia Sotomayor · Elena Kagan; Neil Gorsuch · Brett Kavanaugh

Case opinions
- Majority: Alito, joined by Roberts, Thomas, Breyer, Kagan, Gorsuch, Kavanaugh
- Concurrence: Thomas, joined by Gorsuch
- Dissent: Sotomayor, joined by Ginsburg

Laws applied
- U.S. Const. amend. I

Our Lady of Guadalupe School v. Morrissey-Berru, 591 U.S. 732 (2020), was a United States Supreme Court case involving the ministerial exception of federal employment discrimination laws. The case extends from the Supreme Court's prior decision in Hosanna-Tabor Evangelical Lutheran Church & School v. Equal Employment Opportunity Commission which created the ministerial exception based on the Establishment and Free Exercise Clauses of the United States Constitution, asserting that federal discrimination laws cannot be applied to leaders of religious organizations. The case, along with the consolidated St. James School v. Biel (Docket 19-348), both arose from rulings in the United States Court of Appeals for the Ninth Circuit that found that federal discrimination laws do apply to others within a religious organization that serve an important religious function but lack the title or training to be considered a religious leader under Hosanna-Tabor. The religious organization challenged that ruling on the basis of Hosanna-Tabor. The Supreme Court ruled in a 7–2 decision on July 8, 2020 that reversed the Ninth Circuit's ruling, affirming that the principles of Hosanna-Tabor, that a person can be serving an important religious function even if not holding the title or training of a religious leader, satisfied the ministerial exception in employment discrimination.

== Background ==
In the 2012 case Hosanna-Tabor Evangelical Lutheran Church & School v. Equal Employment Opportunity Commission, the Supreme Court unanimously decided that, in employing leaders, a religious organization need not adhere to federal employment discrimination laws, creating the ministerial exception. Chief Justice John Roberts had written in the opinion that "the Establishment Clause prevents the Government from appointing ministers, and the Free Exercise Clause prevents it from interfering with the freedom of religious groups to select their own". The case had centered on Cheryl Perich, a teacher at the school in question and who was terminated after being diagnosed with narcolepsy. In arriving at defining Perich's role in the school as ministerial, and thus not covered by discrimination laws, Roberts wrote four considerations that they had made for "the formal title given Perich by the Church, the substance reflected in that title, her own use of that title, and the important religious functions she performed for the Church", but Roberts further cautioned that "We are reluctant, however, to adopt a rigid formula for deciding when an employee qualifies as a minister."

For St. James School v. Biel, Kristen Biel was hired as a teacher at St. James School, a Catholic school, in Torrance, California in the 2013 school year. In May 2014, Biel learned she had breast cancer and informed the administration of the need to stop teaching to undergo therapy. She was kept on contract through the rest of the school year, but the school did not renew her contract for the 2014 school year based on "classroom managements". Biel filed notice with the Equal Employment Opportunity Commission (EEOC), believing her termination violated the Americans with Disabilities Act (ADA), and the EEOC gave her authorization to sue the school in the United States District Court for the Central District of California. The District Court issued summary judgement for St. James on the basis that Biel's position fell into that covered by Hosanna-Tabor as ministerial and thus immune from discrimination laws. Biel appealed to the United States Court of Appeals for the Ninth Circuit, which reversed the District Court's ruling. The Ninth compared Biel's situation to that from Hosanna-Tabor and found that while there were similar religious duties involved in both cases, Biel's position was more akin to teaching from a book than ministerial using the four considerations Roberts listed in Hosanna-Tabor, and thus Biel's position was covered by federal discrimination laws. An en banc request by St. James to the full Ninth Circuit was denied. Biel since died from her cancer, but her case continued to be handled her husband representing her estate.

In the case background of Our Lady of Guadalupe School v. Morrissey-Berru, Agnes Morrissey-Berru was a teacher at Our Lady of Guadalupe School in Hermosa Beach, California, a Catholic school. Due to dwindling enrollment and funds, more pressure had been put on the teaching staff starting in the 2012 school year, expecting them to become certified in catechist teaching and adapting certain programs in classes to maintain their Catholic teaching approach, which Morrissey-Berru failed to do as she was not a practicing Catholic. After transitioning her to a part-time position in the 2014 school year to try to amend the situation, the school opted to not renew her contract in 2015 on the basis of her teaching performance. Morrissey-Berru engaged with the Equal Employment Opportunity Commission (EEOC) to file a complaint against the school, asserting that she had been terminated unfairly on the basis of her age, under the Age Discrimination in Employment Act of 1967 (ADEA). The Central District of California Court issued a summary judgement in favor of the school, asserting that Morrissey-Berru's position was that of a ministry and thus falling within the bounds of Hosanna-Tabor and preventing the school from being liable for discrimination. The EEOC appealed to the Ninth Circuit, which reversed the District Court's decision based on the prior decision in Biel following the same reasoning, that Morrissey-Berru's position had similar duties but was not fully ministerial based on Roberts' four considerations, particularly as a non-Catholic. Thus, she was covered by discrimination laws. An en banc request was also denied.

== Supreme Court ==
Both cases petitioned to the Supreme Court to challenge the decision of the Ninth Circuit in light of Hosanna-Tabor. The Supreme Court agreed in December 2019 to hear both cases, consolidating them under Our Lady of Guadalupe.

Oral arguments were heard via teleconference on May 11, 2020, part of the block of cases held in this manner due to the COVID-19 pandemic. The Justices asked questions of how to define a ministerial position as to trigger the ministerial exception to the discrimination rules without too much disruption, as well as when termination is made for reasons that have nothing to do with religious function.

The Court issued its decision on July 8, 2020, reversing the Ninth Circuit's ruling in both consolidated cases and remanding them for review. In the 7–2 majority opinion written by Justice Samuel Alito and joined by all but Justices Ruth Bader Ginsburg and Sonia Sotomayor, the Court ruled that the Ninth had erred in applying the four Hosanna-Tabor conditions that must all be met to evoke the ministerial exception, and instead should be based primarily on the religious function that the position serves within the organization. Alito wrote: "The religious education and formation of students is the very reason for the existence of most private religious schools, and therefore the selection and supervision of the teachers upon whom the schools rely to do this work lie at the core of their mission. Judicial review of the way in which religious schools discharge those responsibilities would undermine the independence of religious institutions in a way that the First Amendment does not tolerate."

Sotomayor wrote a dissent that was joined by Ginsburg, arguing that the decision gave religious organizations a wide berth of power to dismiss employees unrelated to the religious purpose of the organization. Sotomayor wrote "This sweeping result is profoundly unfair. Recently, this Court has lamented a perceived 'discrimination against religion.' Yet here it swings the pendulum in the extreme opposite direction, permitting religious entities to discriminate widely and with impunity for reasons wholly divorced from religious beliefs. The inherent injustice in the Court's conclusion will be impossible to ignore for long, particularly in a pluralistic society like ours."
