= Blown for Good =

2009 book by Marc Headley

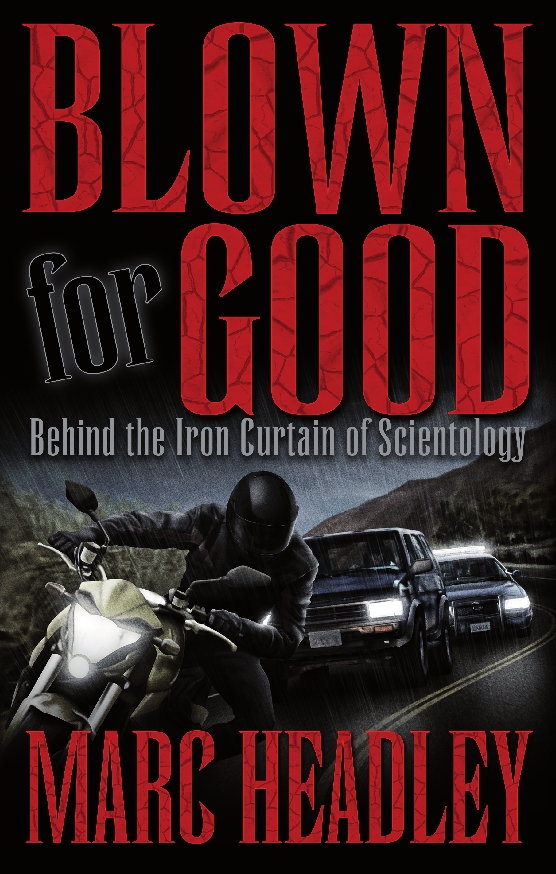
- Cover
- Author: Marc Headley
- Cover artist: Rectoverso Graphic Design
- Language: English
- Subject: Scientology
- Genre: Non-fiction
- Publisher: BFG Books
- Publication date: November 5, 2009
- Publication place: United States
- Media type: Print (Hardcover)
- Pages: 383
- ISBN: 0-9825022-0-6
- OCLC: 436342246
- LC Class: 2009931081
- Website: blownforgood.com

Blown for Good: Behind the Iron Curtain of Scientology is a 2009 memoir written by former Scientologist Marc Headley about his 15 years working for the Church of Scientology, starting at age 16. The book describes his escape from a California compound in 2005, followed by his wife's escape, the prison-like security of the compound which housed the organization's international management, and the physical and mental abuse of the staff members within.

The author goes into detail about the privileged life style of Scientology leader David Miscavige, the over-the-top special treatment of Tom Cruise, and his own interactions with Cruise. Headley worked in the film-production studios and he recounts the aging equipment and outdated processes of making Scientology training films and public relations videos. Blown for Good received positive reception in reviews and media coverage and was described as a "remarkable account", a "bold insider memoir", and a "tell-all book", providing "non-Scientologists the sense of what it's really like to work, day in and day out, in such a strange organization".

== Contents ==
The book's title is a reference to the Scientology terms "blow" or "blown," which describe one who leaves Scientology without prior authorization from the organization. The book opens with a hair-raising account of the author's harrowing escape.

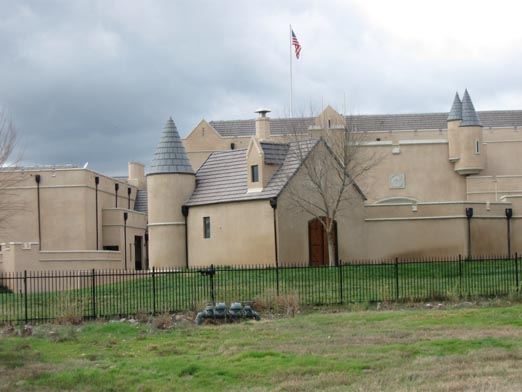
Gold Base (2009)

Headley recounts episodes from his years as a member of the Church of Scientology, most of that time as part of the inner group called the Sea Org. He details his experiences while working hundred-hour weeks at Scientology's secluded international headquarters known as Gold Base (or "Int Base") in California.

The book includes a foreword written by former high-ranking Scientology official Mark Rathbun.

Headley worked out of the film-production studio facilities of Scientology from 1989 through 2005. He held multiple positions while employed by Scientology at Gold Base, mainly focused on the production of video and audio materials to disseminate the message of Scientology founder L. Ron Hubbard. He helped originate scripts of videos to introduce new members to Scientology methodology. He also supervised large scale Scientology public events presided over by Scientology's leader David Miscavige. Headley reproduced thousands of copies of audio recordings of speeches by Hubbard, and he was often faced with repercussions from Miscavige if production quotas were not satisfied. Headley describes an incident where he says he was physically attacked by Miscavige for making a sarcastic comment.

Headley was selected in 1990 to undergo the Scientology practice of auditing, as partner to actor Tom Cruise, (Note: Quote: "Though not as a rule star-struck, Headley admitted that it took him a while to get over what he called the "wow factor" of being audited by the hero of Top Gun.") who had recently finished the film Days of Thunder. Cruise was paired with the author because, according to Headley, he was relatively low on the scale of Scientology courses and young at the time (17), so he would not be viewed as a risk to speak to the press about his experiences with the celebrity. "[Cruise] was going to do his auditor training and he needed someone to audit and this person had to be low on the bridge. That was me," writes Headley. According to the Headley, he worked with Cruise on Scientology exercises called Training Routines for hours at a time each day. These techniques were intended to give the practitioner better control over one's mind. Headley said that he worked with Cruise for a total of three weeks.

Headley outlines behavior patterns of Miscavige in the book. He recounts a 2004 incident where Miscavige instructed his management to participate in a game of musical chairs to the Queen song "Bohemian Rhapsody". According to Headley, the Scientology leader ordered 70 executives to fight for chairs while the music was playing, and said that only the last person remaining would be allowed to stay at Gold Base. The other people would be moved to remote Scientology facilities. The Scientology staff competed with each other for chairs during the game and some became emotional because they thought they would be ordered to locations where they would not see their families. Miscavige later stated no one would have to leave the facility. "Turns out it was going to cost a fortune to fly all these people all over the place and the logistics were not finalized as to how to ship everybody off to the different continents. Dave had called down late during the night and said that he was not willing to waste one single cent of Scientology's money," explains Headley.

The author describes a 2004 event where Tom Cruise was awarded the organization's Freedom Medal of Valor from David Miscavige, the video of which was leaked to the Internet in January 2008. Initially, the video intended for the event featured Cruise and other celebrities including Will Smith appearing on camera and praising the actor. Miscavige disapproved and instructed Scientology staff to create a video where Cruise would speak about himself and his views on being a Scientologist. "Dave Miscavige later said that his Tom Cruise video was one of the most important videos that had ever been produced," writes Headley.

Headley states he gained approval to sell old Scientology materials on eBay to recoup money for the organization – he was later accused of embezzlement for doing this. In 2005, when he knew he would be faced with being sent to the organization's prison-like program, the Rehabilitation Project Force, Headley decided to leave. Headley worried that leaving Scientology would mean becoming separated from his wife Claire, to whom he had been married for 13 years, (Note: Marc and Claire were married in 1992.) and other family members in accordance with the Scientology practice of disconnection.

Headley recounts how on a rainy day in early January 2005 he left Gold Base on his motorcycle, was chased by Scientology security guards who ran him off the road and then started an argument with him. A passing motorist had phoned 911 after seeing the incident and an officer from the Riverside County Sheriff's Department arrived, discovered Headley was from the nearby Scientology compound and escorted him into town and safety.

From there, he traveled to his father's home in Kansas City, Missouri. After Marc's escape, the base was locked down and no one was allowed to leave for any reason. Marc's wife Claire, who worked at RTC at Gold Base, was able to escape a few weeks later by arranging an appointment to get contact lenses, taking a taxi to the bus station, and taking a bus across the country where she was reunited with Marc.

Headley credits multiple sources for introducing doubts about his conditions while living at Gold Base. He writes that he listened to The John and Ken Show on KFI, and that their discussion of Scientology allowed him to think more critically during his time at the compound. He says that viewing Conan O'Brien make fun of Scientology celebrities changed his views on individuals that were spoken of with reverence within Scientology.

== Reception ==
Randy Sly of Catholic Online characterized Blown for Good as "a bold insider memoir". Sly reported on criticism of Scientology in the Australian Senate by Senator Nick Xenophon, and commented, "Headley provides vivid accountings of activities within Scientology that confirm the Australian Senator's concerns." Sly noted, "A number of comments left on the Amazon.com website were from those who indicated they were ex-Scientologists and confirmed the author's accounts."

The book was self-published November 5, 2009, and was made available through the author's website at blownforgood.com and on Amazon.com. Blown for Good was selected as a finalist in the 2009 "Book of the Year Awards", by ForeWord Magazine. The editor in chief of The Village Voice, Tony Ortega, described the book as a "remarkable account". Ortega noted, "Headley's story provides a damning account of life working for Scientology". He concluded the review by commenting, "Perhaps the best service that Headley provides with Blown for Good is giving non-Scientologists the sense of what it's really like to work, day in and day out, in such a strange organization, from the lowliest laborer mucking out excrement in a Gold Base pond (Headley says shit was coming out of his ears and pores for days) to what kind of luxuries the celebrities and high-ranking members enjoy."

On the KFI talk radio program The John and Ken Show, commentators John Kobylt and Ken Chiampou talked about Blown for Good and discussed Scientology. Paul Beaumont, Toni O'Loughlin, and Paul Harris of The Observer commented that Headley's book, "details – as others have – allegations of systematic abuse and bizarre episodes" of experiences in Scientology. They noted, "Headley's book follows a year in which Scientology has been plagued by unwelcome revelations from high-profile defectors and fresh media investigation into its practices."

Ian Punnett of Coast to Coast AM commented that the song "We Gotta Get out of This Place", "certainly would be a theme of several of the chapters of Blown for Good".

Hamilton Nolan of Gawker described the book's design as "featuring a dramatic, action-scene-type cover", and called the work "a new tell-all book". Star described Blown for Good as an "explosive new book". The Flemish daily newspaper published in Belgium, De Standaard, noted the book discusses "remarkable experiences" the author underwent as a Scientology staff member. In a 2010 article in New Humanist, Paul Sims noted, "Since its release at the end of last year, Blown for Good has made the kind of impact its author hoped. Having built up an online buzz courtesy of Anonymous, and sold thousands of copies in the US, Headley says he has been receiving letters and emails from Scientologists, many of whom have said the revelations in his book have confirmed their suspicions about the inner workings of the Church."

== Marc Headley ==
Marc Headley was raised in Los Angeles, California. Headley's mother was a Scientologist, and she raised him within the church from an early age. He began work as an employee for the church at age 16. Headley soon after joined the Sea Org and worked at the international headquarters of Scientology in Hemet, California, for 15 years. Headley escaped from the international headquarters of the organization in 2005. He was escorted to town and safety by the police during his escape from the organization.

After leaving Scientology, Headley wrote about his experiences in Scientology. His writings were published in the media, news magazines, publications on the internet and other websites. In 2008, Headley spoke in Hamburg, Germany, at a conference discussing abuses within Scientology, alongside actor and former Scientologist Jason Beghe.

Marc Headley speaking at conference on Scientology in Hamburg, 2008

Part 1 of 3

Part 2 of 3

Part 3 of 3

Headley has continued to speak out about his experiences in Scientology, including being featured on an episode of Leah Remini: Scientology and the Aftermath in 2016, and running a YouTube channel called "Blown for Good - Scientology Exposed".

Headley is a Board Member of The Aftermath Foundation. The Aftermath Foundation helps former Sea Org members get back on their feet after having no contact with the outside world as they usually do not have an employment history, credit history, bank account, driver's license or sometimes even a formal education.

In a 2009 interview on The John and Ken Show, Headley was asked if he had experienced any retaliation from Scientology for speaking critically about the organization. He responded that he had been declared a suppressive person, and explained, "That's basically the thing that goes out to anyone and everyone who is in Scientology, saying, 'This person is a Suppressive Person, and you can no longer speak to him ever again.' If you are in Scientology, and you speak to somebody who is a Suppressive Person, you yourself can be declared a Suppressive Person." Headley said when he left Scientology the organization gave him a "freeloader bill" (Note: Quote: "Offloaded Sea org members are presented with "freeloader bills" for the year of training and auditing they've received as church employees. All "blown" staffers must reimburse the church to clear this debt before they can resume auditing and other services and be considered members in good standing.") for $62,000, for courses he had received in Scientology. (Note: Between both Marc and Claire Headley, the couple were billed for more than $150,000.) "It's actually illegal, because they are basically charging me for on-the-job training – in California you can't charge somebody for on-the-job training. It's of no real value, but you don't know that, when you're in Scientology. You think, 'Are they going to garnish my wages, are they going to sue me?' You don't know," said Headley.

In 2009, Marc and Claire Headley filed a lawsuit, Headley v. Church of Scientology International, which alleged that the organization had engaged in unfair labor practices, forced abortion, human trafficking, and violated the Headley's human rights during their time of employment in the Sea Org. Their case was dismissed in district court in 2010. An appeal was lost in 2012 and they were ordered to pay the Church $42,852.06 for their litigation costs. The Church offered to waive the fee if they agreed to a gag order and to give up the rights to their book Blown for Good. Claire's response was "over my dead body", and the couple sold items, borrowed money, and sent a cashier's check four days later. "I did everything to scrape together — down to the last six cents," remarked Claire.

As of 2023, Headley was living in Colorado with his wife Claire and three sons, and is the CEO of MODE Systems.

== See also ==
- Headley v. Church of Scientology International
- Scientology controversies
- Bibliography of books critical of Scientology
