= Hosanna-Tabor Evangelical Lutheran Church & School v. Equal Employment Opportunity Commission =

Hosanna-Tabor Evangelical Lutheran Church and School v. Equal Employment Opportunity Commission
- Supreme Court of the United States

Argued October 5, 2011 Decided January 11, 2012
- Full case name: Hosanna-Tabor Evangelical Lutheran Church and School, Petitioner v. Equal Employment Opportunity Commission, et al.
- Docket no.: 10-553
- Citations: 565 U.S. 171 (more) 132 S. Ct. 694; 181 L. Ed. 2d 650; 2012 U.S. LEXIS 578; 80 U.S.L.W. 4056; 114 Fair Empl. Prac. Cas. (BNA) 129; 95 Empl. Prac. Dec. (CCH) ¶ 44,385; 25 Am. Disabilities Cas. (BNA) 1057; 23 Fla. L. Weekly Fed. S 46

Case history
- Prior: Judgement for defendant, 582 F. Supp. 2d 881 (E.D. Mich. 2008), reversed and remanded, 597 F.3d 769 (6th Cir. 2010); certiorari granted, 563 U.S. 903 (2011).

Holding
- The Establishment and Free Exercise Clauses of the First Amendment bar suits brought on behalf of ministers against their churches claiming termination in violation of employment discrimination laws.

Court membership
- Chief Justice John Roberts Associate Justices Antonin Scalia · Anthony Kennedy; Clarence Thomas · Ruth Bader Ginsburg; Stephen Breyer · Samuel Alito; Sonia Sotomayor · Elena Kagan

Case opinions
- Majority: Roberts, joined by unanimous
- Concurrence: Thomas
- Concurrence: Alito, joined by Kagan

Laws applied
- U.S. Const. amend. I

Hosanna-Tabor Evangelical Lutheran Church and School v. Equal Employment Opportunity Commission, 565 U.S. 171 (2012), was a United States Supreme Court case in which the Court unanimously ruled that federal discrimination laws do not apply to religious organizations' selection of religious leaders.

== Background ==
In 1999, Cheryl Perich started teaching at Hosanna-Tabor Evangelical Lutheran Church and School, an affiliate of the Lutheran Church–Missouri Synod in Redford, Michigan. In addition to other duties, Perich led students in prayer and taught a religion class several days a week. In 2004, Perich left on disability and was diagnosed with narcolepsy. In 2005, after she was cleared by her doctors to go back to work, the school told her that it already hired someone else. Perich threatened to file suit, and the school promptly fired her for "insubordination and disruptive behavior". Perich sued for unlawful dismissal under the Federal Americans with Disabilities Act.

== Opinion of the Court ==
All nine Supreme Court justices agreed with the decision written by Chief Justice John Roberts that "the Establishment Clause prevents the Government from appointing ministers, and the Free Exercise Clause prevents it from interfering with the freedom of religious groups to select their own". Moreover, because the respondent, in this case, was a minister within the meaning of the ministerial exception, the First Amendment requires dismissal of her employment discrimination suit against her religious employer. The decision explicitly left open the question of whether religious organizations could be sued for other reasons: "We express no view on whether the exception bars other types of suits, including actions by employees alleging breach of contract or tortious conduct". The Court also developed multiple factors to determine whether an employee qualifies as a minister within the meaning of the ministerial exception. These factors include how the school viewed the employee, the employee's title, and whether the employee's duties included important religious functions.

=== Concurrences ===
Justice Clarence Thomas wrote a concurrence, in which he eschewed the use of any specific test for determining who qualifies as a minister, writing that he would like to "defer to a religious organization's good-faith understanding of who qualifies as a minister".

Justice Samuel Alito wrote a concurring opinion, which Elena Kagan joined, stating that the word "minister" used in the decision should extend to similar titles for other religions such as rabbi for Judaism or imam in Islam.

== Reaction ==
=== Support ===
The Family Research Council expressed support for the decision. In a press release, a spokesperson for the organization stated: "We are pleased that the Supreme Court rejected the Obama administration's profoundly troubling claim of power over churches, and glad to see that the Supreme Court has stayed out of the Lutheran Church's affairs and allowed its internal rules as a body of believers to stand." (While FRC criticized the "Obama Administration", President Obama actually made no comment on the case, which the government began under the George W. Bush Administration. However, the Obama Administration, namely the Justice Department, did in fact file an opposition brief that asserted the ministerial exemption should be severely limited). Five days following the decision, Mitt Romney praised the decision saying, "We are very fortunate [to have people] who are willing to stand up for religious tolerance and religious liberty and the First Amendment of this Constitution in this country."

=== Criticism ===
In a January 12, 2012, editorial, the New York Times concluded that the decision gave "sweeping deference to churches" which "does not serve [churches] or society wisely":

Although the court does not provide much guidance on how to proceed in future lawsuits against churches as employers, the ruling has broad sweep. It abandons the court's longtime practice of balancing the interest in the free exercise of religion against important government interests, like protection against workplace bias or retaliation. With a balancing test, courts consider whether a general law, if applied to a religious institution, would inhibit its freedom more broadly than justified, and, in those circumstances, courts could exempt the church. In her brief, Ms. Perich warned that expanding the ministerial exception to include workers like her would allow a religious organization, for example, to retaliate against a teacher for reporting sexual abuse of a student to the government.

=== Impact ===
In 2014, the Archdiocese of Cincinnati ordered its 2,000 teachers regardless of religion to sign a "detailed morality clause" that critics say focuses on "pelvic issues." The new contracts forbid teachers from living together, having sex outside of marriage, using in-vitro fertilization or surrogacy, exhibiting a gay "lifestyle" or any speech expressing support for these things.

Two cases originating from the United States Court of Appeals for the Ninth Circuit have challenged the applicability of Hossana-Tabor to teachers at religious schools who have ministerial duties but lack the title or training expected for such a position, leading to the Supreme Court case Our Lady of Guadalupe School v. Morrissey-Berru. The July 2020 ruling on that case relied on Hosanna-Tabor to rule in favor of the schools against the teachers.

The Obama Administration's case was argued by Leondra Kruger, who at the time worked under Solicitor General Donald Verrilli. In 2022, as a candidate for the Supreme Court, this led to questions about her views on freedom of religion.

== See also ==
- List of United States Supreme Court cases, volume 565
- First English Evangelical Lutheran Church v. Los Angeles County (1987)
