= Headley v. Church of Scientology International =

Lawsuit about human trafficking

Headley et al. v. Church of Scientology International et al.
- Court: United States District Court, Central District of California
- Full case name: Claire Headley v. Church of Scientology International, et al.
- Citation: 687 F.3d 1173

Court membership
- Judges sitting: Dorothy W. Nelson, Diarmuid F. O'Scannlain, and Norman Randy Smith

Headley et al. v. Church of Scientology International et al. was a court case filed in 2009 by Claire and Marc Headley against the Church of Scientology International, alleging that the organization had violated laws against human trafficking and violated their human rights during their time of employment in the Sea Org. The Federal District Court decided that the ministerial exemption in the First Amendment protected the Church of Scientology from litigation and dismissed the case. The Headleys appealed. In 2012, the United States Court of Appeals for the Ninth Circuit affirmed the lower court's dismissal; it did not address the Constitutional issues of the trafficking and abuse claims (as had the lower court), but ruled that there was insufficient evidence that the Headley's had been obtained by "serious harm, threats or other improper methods." The Court took note that the Headleys lived off base and had many opportunities to leave, but stayed of their own will.

== History ==
In 2009, Marc and Claire Headley sued the Church under the federal Victims of Trafficking and Violence Protection Act of 2000 (TVPA). In response, Church lawyers argued that the First Amendment prohibited the courts from considering "a forced labor claim premised upon ... social and psychological factors," because they concern "the beliefs, the religious upbringing, the religious training, the religious practices, the religious lifestyle restraints of a religious order."

In August 2010, the U.S. District Court for the Central District of California found that the church enjoyed the protection of the Free Exercise Clause in the First Amendment, and that the "ministerial exemptions" in employment law prevented the government from interfering in the treatment of its ministers. The judge ruled that the First Amendment disallowed the courts from "examining church operations rooted in religious scripture." Bringing the Church to account for how it disciplined its members was "precisely the type of entanglement that the religion clauses prohibit." In dismissing Headley's claims, the district court further ordered Headley to pay the Church's costs for the action. The Headleys took the case to the Ninth Circuit Court.

== Ruling ==
The Ninth Circuit Court affirmed the lower court's decision in July 2012.

The Church acknowledged that the rules under which the Headleys lived included a ban on having children, censored mail, monitored phone calls, needing permission to have Internet access, and being disciplined through manual labor.

The Ninth Circuit Court noted in its ruling that Marc Headley had been made to clean human excrement by hand from an aeration pond on the compound with no protective equipment, while Claire Headley was banned from the dining hall for up to eight months in 2002. She lost 30 pounds (14 kg) as a result of subsisting on protein bars and water. In addition, she had two abortions to comply with the Sea Org's no-children policy. The Headleys also experienced physical violence from Scientology executives and saw others being treated violently.

The Court cited evidence that showed Headleys were fully informed of the requirements of the Sea Org, had multiple opportunities to leave and did not, and had no problem leaving when they did. The Court suggested that other claims might have withstood appellate review, had the Headleys brought them, such as assault, battery or "any of a number of other theories that might have better fit the evidence."

As author of the Court's opinion, Judge Diarmuid F. O’Scannlain wrote:

The act bars an employer from obtaining another's labor 'by means of' force, physical restraint, serious harm, threats or an improper scheme ... That text is a problem for the Headleys because the record contains little evidence that the defendants obtained the Headleys' labor 'by means of' serious harm, threats or other improper methods.

The Ninth Circuit also found that it did not need to reach whether the ministerial exception would bar a claim under the TVPA, since the Headleys did not establish a genuine issue of fact as to whether the church obtained their labor "by means of" improper conduct.

== Comment and subsequent development ==
Tampa lawyer Greg W. Kehoe, a 25-year Justice Department veteran, stated, "Here is a court saying, albeit in a civil situation ... that there is nothing improper with this type of conduct and no ill motive can be imbued to the church."

An FBI investigation of similar complaints against the Church was dropped around the same time as the lower court ruling in the Headley case, possibly because of it. Former U.S. federal prosecutor Michael Seigel said of the ruling, "It's very straightforward. It's sweeping. And (it) doesn't seem to leave much room for hope of success on a criminal prosecution."

After three and a half years in court, the Headleys were ordered to pay the church $42,852.06 for its costs. The church offered to waive the amount in exchange for the Headleys' silence, their cooperation, and the rights to their book, Blown for Good. The Headleys declined and paid the amount in full.
