= Ministerial exception =

Religious employment relationships

The ministerial exception, sometimes known as the ecclesiastical exception, is a legal doctrine in the United States barring the application of anti-discrimination and other laws governing the employment relationship between a religious institution and certain key employees with ministerial roles. As the Supreme Court explained in the landmark 2012 case Hosanna-Tabor Evangelical Lutheran Church and School v. E.E.O.C., the exception is drawn from the First Amendment to the United States Constitution and serves two purposes: to safeguard the freedom of religious groups "to select their own ministers" and to prevent "government involvement in [...] ecclesiastical decisions". The first purpose is rooted in the Free Exercise Clause; the second, in the Establishment Clause. When the ministerial exception applies, it gives religious institutions an affirmative defense against lawsuits for discrimination. For example, a woman seeking to become a Catholic priest cannot sue the Catholic Church for sex discrimination over its position that women cannot be ordained as priests. The Supreme Court later elaborated on when employees qualify as ministerial – and thus how broadly the exception applies – in Our Lady of Guadalupe School v. Morrissey-Berru (2020).

== Doctrinal foundation ==
=== Pre-Hosanna-Tabor ===
The first application of the ministerial exception was in McClure v. Salvation Army, where the Fifth Circuit found in 1972 that an employee could not sue the Salvation Army for violations under Title VII of the Civil Rights Act, stating that the "application of Civil Rights Act provisions relating to equal employment opportunities to relationship of Salvation Army and its officer who was minister would result in encroachment by state into area of religious freedom in violation of First Amendment." While the McClure court reasoned that the text of Title VII could not be construed to allow such suits, later decisions by other lower courts have constitutionalized the exception.

In the years after McClure, with the Supreme Court having yet to weigh in, the constitutional foundations of the exception became widely debated by scholars. Professors Douglas Laycock, Ira Lupu, Robert W. Tuttle, and Christopher Lund, for example, argued that the exception was required by either the Free Exercise Clause, the Establishment Clause, or both, while others like Professor Caroline Corbin argued that First Amendment jurisprudence did not mandate the exception at all.

=== Hosanna-Tabor ===
In 2012, in Hosanna-Tabor, the Supreme Court addressed the ministerial exception for the first time. Writing for the majority, Chief Justice John Roberts endorsed the exception, grounding it in both the Free-Exercise and Establishment Clauses. The majority also ruled that it applied to the case at hand, barring Cheryl Perich, a teacher, from suing her employer, a Missouri Synod church and school, under the Americans with Disabilities Act (ADA). Although the court declined to adopt a "rigid formula" to determine who is a minister, it found compelling that Ms. Perich (1) was held out as a minister and given a formal ministerial title, (2) had undergone a "significant degree of religious training" in order to obtain that title, (3) held herself out as a minister, even claiming special housing allowances for ministers on her taxes, and (4) performed significant religious functions, including "a role in conveying the Church's message and carrying out its mission."

The entire court agreed with this outcome, but Justices Samuel Alito and Elena Kagan wrote separately to stress that the last factor the majority cited—whether the employee functions as a minister, including "those who serve in positions of leadership, those who perform important functions in worship services and in the performance of religious ceremonies and rituals, and those who are entrusted with teaching and conveying the tenets of the faith to the next generation"—should be the touchstone of the analysis. Otherwise, they feared that a strict application of the other factors would hinder religious traditions without concepts of ministerial status or ordination from claiming the exception. Justice Clarence Thomas also wrote separately, noting that his preferred standard for who should qualify as a minister would "defer to a religious organization's good-faith understanding."

Since Hosanna-Tabor, scholars have continued to debate the exception.

== Recent litigation ==
Even with the guidance of Hosanna-Tabor, lower courts have struggled to apply the standard for who should qualify as a minister. While some courts have hewed closer to Justice Alito and Kagan's function-centric standard, others have declined to apply the exception when employees like teachers function as ministers in some broad sense, but hold no other indicia of ministerial status. The Ninth Circuit has typified this approach. In Biel v. St. James School, in 2018, the court declined to use the exception to bar the disability-discrimination suit of an elementary school teacher who "taught religion for about thirty minutes a day, four days a week, using a workbook on the Catholic faith." The court held similarly in Morrissey-Berru v. Our Lady of Guadalupe School, in 2019, allowing a Catholic elementary school teacher's age discrimination suit to move forward.

Both the Biel and Morrissey-Berru decisions were appealed to the Supreme Court, which granted certiorari and consolidated the cases on December 18, 2019. The Court held oral arguments via phone on May 11, 2020 due to the COVID-19 pandemic. While the schools (as well as the United States government as amicus curiae), argued that a single Hosanna-Tabor factor, namely performing important religious functions, should be sufficient to confer ministerial status upon an employee, the employees argued that the first three Hosanna-Tabor factors, the "objective" indicia of ministerial status, should be given priority, preventing religious institutions from using the exception to defend against suits from lay teachers. The issue has garnered some mainstream media attention, with Linda Greenhouse in particular writing multiple opinion columns in the New York Times highlighting the case. The Supreme Court issued a 7–2 decision on July 8, 2020 (called Our Lady of Guadalupe School v. Morrissey-Berru) that reversed the Ninth Circuit's ruling, affirming that the principles of Hosanna-Tabor, that a person can serve an important religious function even without holding the title or training of a religious leader, and still qualify for the ministerial exception.

== Potential future litigation ==
In addition to cases like Biel and Morrissey-Berru, which aim to elucidate the scope of the term "minister" for the exception, there may also be future litigation seeking to clarify the scope of laws and regulations from which religious institutions are exempted. While suits under anti-discrimination statutes like Title VII and the ADA seem to be clearly barred by the exception, some lower courts have held that the ministerial exception also applies to a broader array of employment claims, including sexual harassment claims, wage-and-hour claims under the Fair Labor Standards Act, and breach of contract claims.
