= Scientology as a business =

The Church of Scientology publicly classifies itself as a religion, however many scholars and other observers regard it as a business on the grounds that the organization operates more like a for-profit business than a religious institution. Some scholars of sociology working in religious studies consider it a new religious movement. Overall, as stated by Stephen A. Kent, Scientology can be seen as a "multi-faceted transnational corporation that has religion as only one of its many components. Other components include political aspirations, business ventures, cultural productions, pseudo-medical practices, pseudo-psychiatric claims, and (among its most devoted members who have joined the Sea Organization), an alternative family structure."

== Business practices ==
Several of the Church's (Note: Use of "Church" or "the Church" is a common shortened form of "Church of Scientology"; see The Church (Scientology).) practices resemble business operations, including paying recruiters a percentage of the money received from the people they attract, and the franchising and licensing practices that result in large revenues for the highest levels of the Church. Such activities distinguish Scientology from other religious organizations. The Church pays 10% commissions to recruiters, called Field Staff Members (FSMs), on new recruits they bring in who pay for a course or counseling. In addition, Church of Scientology missions (formerly called franchises), pay the Church roughly 10% of their gross income. The Church charges for auditing hours and other training courses required for advancing through the levels of Scientology. These programs can run to tens or hundreds of thousands of dollars.

The Bridge to Total Freedom in Scientology is a large chart consisting of two main columns; training levels on the left and processing (auditing) on the right. Training is considered half of the gains a person might receive while in Scientology.

Religious Technology Center and Church of Spiritual Technology are the corporations which maintain ownership and control over the use of Scientology symbols, copyrights, and trademarks, including the Scientology cross, and its lawyers have threatened lawsuits against individuals and organizations who have published these protected images without permission in books and on websites. Because of this, it is difficult for independent scientology groups to attempt to practice Scientology publicly without an official connection or license with the Church of Scientology. Scientology has sued a number of individuals who attempted to set up their own scientology practices, using copyright law and trademark law to shut down such operations.

Writing in Skeptic magazine, Michael Shermer contrasted such practices with mainstream religions: "Envision converting to Judaism but having to pay for courses in order to hear the story of Abraham and Isaac, Noah and the flood, or Moses and the Ten Commandments. Or imagine joining the Catholic Church but not being told about the crucifixion and the resurrection until you have reached Operating Theological Level III, which can only be attained after many years and tens of thousands of dollars in church-run courses."

The German government takes the view that Scientology is a commercial enterprise, and Belgium, France, Ireland, Luxembourg, Philippines, Israel and Mexico remain unconvinced that Scientology is a religion. Other countries have recognised Scientology as a religion. An Australian Government Inquiry into Charities in 2001 found that the 1983 High Court case which found Scientology to be a religion, and also defined religion for the Constitution, used as the standard to determine what organisations are charitable.

== L. Ron Hubbard and Scientology as a business ==
Religious studies professor Hugh Urban and journalist Janet Reitman, amongst others, have noted that L. Ron Hubbard, the founder of the Church of Scientology, decided to market the practice as a religion for practical reasons. Harlan Ellison reported being present when the idea for creating a new religion was first discussed: "Lester del Rey then said half-jokingly, 'What you really ought to do is create a religion because it will be tax-free,' and at that point everyone in the room started chiming in with ideas for this new religion. So the idea was a Gestalt that Ron caught on to and assimilated the details. He then wrote it up as 'Dianetics: A New Science of the Mind' and sold it to John W. Campbell Jr., who published it in Astounding Science Fiction in 1950." Hubbard had a different origin story and stated that Dianetics had been researched during the years 1945-1950 and it was initially presented as a science, however religious ideas were added into his 1951 book Science of Survival. After the commercial failure of the Dianetics Foundation and disputes over the direction of the subject, Hubbard revisited the possibility of classifying his philosophical teachings as a religion, and in a 1953 letter Hubbard wrote that "the religion angle" seemed to make sense as "a matter of practical business".

The Founding Church of Scientology of Washington, D.C., had obtained tax-exempt status in 1956 on the claim that it was "a corporation organized and operated exclusively for religious purposes, no part of the earnings of which inures to any individual". That status was revoked in 1958, on the grounds (as argued by the U.S. Department of Justice in subsequent proceedings) that the Church's "most extensive and significant activities are directed towards the earnings of substantial fees" and "the founder of the organisation L. Ron Hubbard remains in complete control and receives substantial remuneration and perquisites both from the taxpayer and a network of affiliates". The findings of fact in the case included that Hubbard had personally received over $108,000 from 1955–1959 (equivalent to $1,162,233 in 2024) from the Church and affiliates over a four-year period, over and above the percentage of gross income (usually 10%) he received from Church-affiliated organizations. In addition, the Church had paid for Hubbard's car and for his personal residence, his wife Mary Sue Hubbard had made $10,685 (equivalent to $116,179 in 2024) renting property to the Church, and two of their children were given money for loans, reimbursements, and wages without evidence of services performed. The United States Court of Claims concluded, "What emerges from these facts is the inference that the Hubbard family was entitled to make ready personal use of the corporate earnings." In 1993, the IRS granted full tax deductibility to the Church of Scientology and its subsidiaries.

Per policy set by Hubbard, The Church of Scientology is prohibited from providing free services, requiring compensation or some other form of volunteer services in exchange.

== Finance policies ==
The Church of Scientology follows finance policies written by L. Ron Hubbard to ensure the organizations make money and have good credit."

=== Delayed bill payment for creditors ===
Hubbard's codified method of payments for creditors is to delay payment under a bureaucratic and deliberately slow and inefficient method of disbursements, and to stop using any service provider who complains or demands payment sooner. Calling it "dateline paying", in 1965 he wrote that bills should be paid oldest first, and only be paid up to a certain date, unless there are "threats of vast action"; tradesmen demanding payment or threatening suits are never to be used again. Use of this policy has resulted in numerous lawsuits brought against Scientology organizations to obtain payment of bills.

=== Prepayment required by parishioners ===
In contrast to Hubbard's policy on creditors, his policy on payment for services mandates prepayment, framed as "requested donations". According to Benjamin Beit-Hallahmi, "in Scientology there can be no participation in any activities without a fee [...] Does Scientology provide any services without a fee? While the practice of fee-for-service in the case of rites of passage is common in many religions, in Scientology nothing is free, and gaining membership is defined by financial contracts and payments only." According to a 1990 Los Angeles Times article, "Church tenets mandate that parishioners purchase Scientology goods and services under Hubbard's "doctrine of exchange." [...] for its programs and books, the church charges 'fixed donations'", and the Church of Scientology continues to add new courses which are heavily promoted as crucial and urgent. Faced with high-pressure sales tactics, it is not unusual for parishioners to mortgage their homes, obtain credit, or sell assets to afford Scientology courses or auditing.

=== Conditions of exchange ===
Policies about "exchange" did not appear in Scientology literature until the early 1970s, and then only in the administrative and management writings. Hubbard delineated four conditions of exchange in transactions: criminal exchange (giving nothing for something), partial exchange (giving less than expected), fair exchange, and exchange in abundance (giving more service or goods than the other party expected). Hubbard asserted that giving something for nothing would force the other party into criminal exchange, and could cause someone to become mentally or physically ill. This concept justified charging for all services and forbidding giving away services for free.

The framing of these concepts as "the doctrine of exchange" was part of a courtroom strategy to characterize fixed-prices for auditing and training services as a religious obligation rather than a commercial transaction. In a 1988 appeal before the US Supreme Court asking that such payments be designated charitable deductions for personal income tax purposes, the court upheld lower court rulings that the Church of Scientology's mandatory fixed pricing structure constituted quid pro quo transactions and therefore such payments did not qualify as charitable contributions, regardless of the Church's claim that such payments were required by a "central tenet known as the doctrine of exchange". (Note: Quotation re "doctrine of exchange": "according to which any time a person receives something, he must pay something back. In so doing, a Scientologist maintains "inflow" and "outflow," and avoids spiritual decline.") This legal position remained in effect until 1993 when the IRS conceded to grant tax-exempt status to the Church of Scientology and its associated organizations following years of adversarial negotiations and more than 2,000 lawsuits filed against the IRS.

== Commissions, field staff members and field auditors ==
The Church of Scientology pays out a range of sales commissions.

Staff members can receive 10% commissions for selling books and lectures, and some positions in the organization are occasionally paid "production bonuses" to certain high-value personnel such as "registrars" (sales people).

Scientology members who are not staff are labelled "Field Staff Members". FSMs receive commissions when they bring a person to an organization who then buys services. The person brought in is called a "selectee". FSM commissions are 15% of all training paid for and started, and 10% for auditing services. Organizations with hotels connected to them, such as the Flag Service Organization, will pay commissions on hotel rooms booked and paid for. For as long as an FSM's selectee is paying for new services, the FSM is paid a commission on it.

Field auditors are trained auditors that are not on staff at a Church of Scientology organization, but who audit the public as part of a field practice rather than as Church staff. They are required to charge fees that are not lower than those of their local Church. Field auditors operate under IHELP (International Hubbard Ecclesiastical League of Pastors), to which they pay a licensing fee as well as 10% of their gross revenue from auditing.

== Scientology-owned properties ==
The Church of Scientology (COS) owns hundreds of properties worldwide, with major concentrations in Los Angeles, California and Clearwater, Florida, a 500-acre compound in Southern California, a 55-acre campus in England, and a cruise ship in the Caribbean. In Clearwater, the church has purchased most of the surrounding real estate near its facilities, a practice critics describe as creating a buffer zone from the public. In Hollywood, COS has become the largest private owner of historic buildings through its acquisition program. In recent decades, the church has engaged in extensive fundraising campaigns and has continued to acquire properties across the United States and internationally. Because much of their property is designated "for religious purposes", the Church of Scientology has saved millions of dollars in property taxes.

== See also ==
- World Institute of Scientology Enterprises
- Hubbard College of Administration International
- Sterling Management Systems
- List of Scientology organizations
- Scientology status by country
