= U Kyi =

U Kyi (Burmese: ဦးကြည်; born 1 June 1934) is a Burmese inventor and lecturer who invented the first robot in South East Asia. His robot was designed to spray paint on cars. It can sit, stand and move freely. However, due to the lack of maintenance, the robot can no longer move.

== Early life and education ==
U Kyi was born on 1 June 1934 in Dawei, Tanintharyi Division to parent Ba Hlaing and Ah Mar. He was the only child in his family. He got his diploma from the Associate of Government Technology Institute (A.G.T.I) in 1954. Later, he served as a tutor at the Insein GTI.

== Invention ==
In the 1960s, the Robotic Technology test was developed and U Kyi was preparing to be sent as a scholar to the United States. In 1963, he arrived back in Myanmar and started inventing robot which is now displayed at the front of the Insein GTI Student Reunion building. From 1970 to 1980, he served as a lecturer in GTI.

His first robot was created in 1986, 7 years before Japan's 007 Honda robot. The function of the robot is to spray paint on cars. It can sit, stand and move well. Nevertheless, without maintenance, the robot can no longer work or move. It took about six months for U Kyi to build this robot. He built it with scrap pieces of iron and aluminium from the Phawt Kan market. He proposed to the government about his car-painting robot project but was rejected by the government. Later after the 8888 Uprising in 1988, the student group, now the new government, gave support. However, the government withdrew their support when U Kyi requested further assistance for his project and was forbidden from creating any more inventions. He was appointed as the principal of Aung San Industrial and General Training School and retired in 1994.

== Legacy ==
U Kyi's robot is considered as the Myanmar's first humanoid robot and displayed in front of the Insein GTI Student Reunion building.
