= Richard McKinney =

Richard McKinney may refer to:

- Richard McKinney (footballer) (born 1979), Northern Ireland football goalkeeper
- Richard McKinney (archer) (born 1953), American Olympic archer
- Richard McKinney (executive) (born 1950), American executive

== See also ==
- Rich McKinney (born 1946), former Major League Baseball player
