= Church of Scientology =

American organization and business

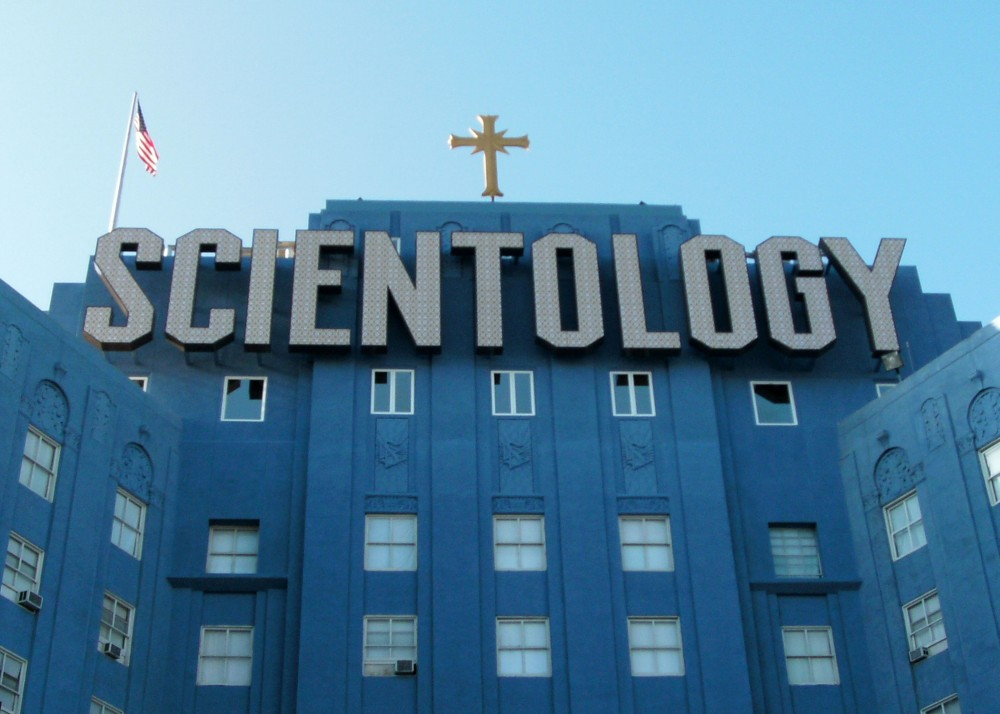
- Scientology building in Los Angeles
- Abbreviation: COS
- Predecessor: Dianetics Foundation; Hubbard Association of Scientologists
- Formation: December 1953; 72 years ago
- Founder: L. Ron Hubbard
- Legal status: Conglomerate of privately-held interrelated corporations and groups
- Headquarters: 6331 Hollywood Blvd, Los Angeles, California
- Region served: Worldwide
- Services: Scientology; Dianetics
- Key people: David Miscavige
- Website: scientology.org

The Church of Scientology was started in 1953 by L. Ron Hubbard to promote and practice his Scientology theories and techniques. The term 'Church of Scientology' (abbreviated 'the Church' (Note: Use of "Church" or "the Church" is a common shortened form of "Church of Scientology"; see The Church (Scientology).)) does not refer to any one corporate entity, but instead serves as a collective label for a network of privately‑held organizations, unified under the direction of its leader David Miscavige who serves as the central authority. Most of the top-level management divisions are located at 6331 Hollywood Blvd, Los Angeles, California, or the building's side entrance 1710 Ivar Avenue. The Church of Scientology International (CSI) is officially the "mother church" responsible for guiding the other public-facing Scientology centers, which are called "orgs". Management and advanced orgs are staffed exclusively by members of the Sea Org, which is a strict organization for the most dedicated core of Scientologists.

The Church has been the subject of a number of controversies. While in some countries it has attained legal recognition as a religious, a charitable, or a tax-exempt organization, it has also been described as a dangerous cult and a manipulative profit-making business in government inquiries, media investigative reports, superior court judgements and parliamentary debates.

== History ==
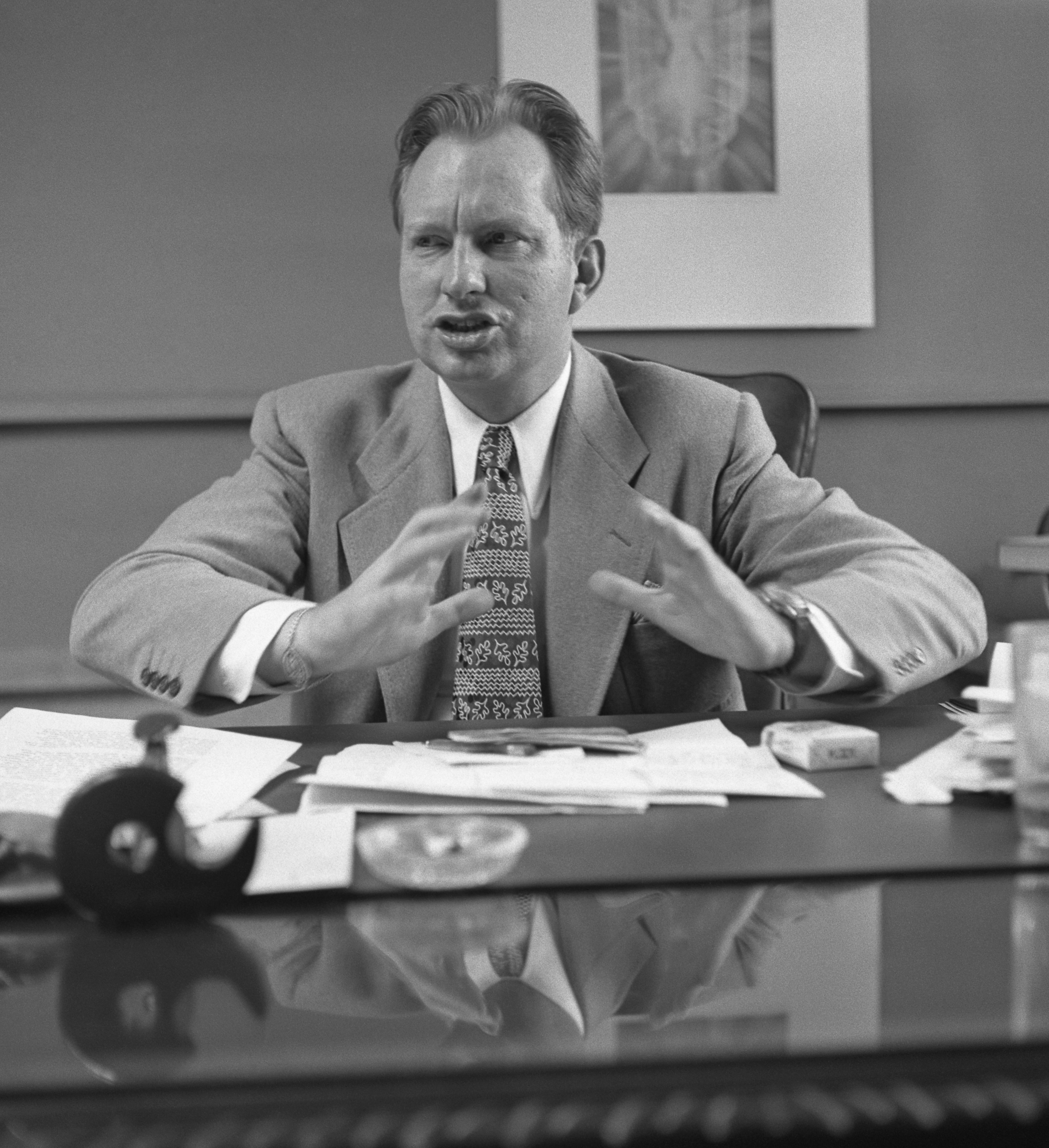
L. Ron Hubbard, founder of the Church of Scientology

In 1950, L. Ron Hubbard established organizations to manage activities related to his invention of Dianetics; the organizations went bankrupt and Hubbard moved to Arizona where he started Scientology. In 1952, Hubbard established the Hubbard Association of Scientologists (HAS), a secular organization, and in 1953 the first Church of Scientology organization was incorporated in Camden, New Jersey. The HAS was dissolved and the Hubbard Association of Scientologists International (HASI), a religious fellowship, was established to be the managing umbrella organization over all other organizations. In late 1954, Hubbard made the official announcement that Scientology was a religion. In 1954, the first Church of Scientology was incorporated in California, which in 1956 was renamed to the Church of Scientology of California. That organization was to become the 'mother church' over hundreds of smaller churches and missions of Scientology until 1981 when that status was passed to the Church of Scientology International.

Hubbard had official control of the organizations until 1966 when he publicly resigned, though he continued to give orders to executives, secretly running the organizations. Although Hubbard maintained no formal position within Scientology's management structure, he remained firmly in control of the organization and its affiliated organizations, often using code names and code words to obscure his involvement. When some of the top ranking staff, including Hubbard's wife, were indicted for infiltrating the US government in their actions of Operation Snow White, Hubbard went into deep hiding though continued to manage control over the organizations but this time through intermediaries—predominantly Pat Broeker and David Miscavige.

After the convictions in United States v. Hubbard, there was a flurry of activity creating new corporations in the early 1980s to avoid further government scrutiny and to limit and compartmentalize liabilities. The Guardian's Office was replaced with the Office of Special Affairs; Religious Technology Center (RTC) was created, and numerous other corporations sprang up during this period, which acquired the name "corporate sort out" (CSO). The idea was to "create a legally defensible structure that would give Hubbard and the Commodore's Messenger Organization full legal control over Scientology while at the same time insulating both Hubbard and the CMO from any legal liability for running the organizations of Scientology by lying about the level of control they really had."

In 1986, after the death of L. Ron Hubbard, Pat and Annie Broeker presented documents from Hubbard showing they had been promoted to "Loyal Officers" and were named as Hubbard's successors in managing the Sea Org. However, a year later David Miscavige had wrested power from the Broekers and became the leader of the Scientology organization.

== Hierarchy of organizations ==
The Church of Scientology network operates as a multinational conglomerate of companies with personnel, executives, organizational charts, chains of command, policies and orders:

Today, what we call "Scientology" is in reality a remarkably complex network of ostensibly independent but clearly interconnected corporate entities. ... with a centralized bureaucracy and hierarchical structure. ... [Religious Technology Center] is the most powerful executive organization within the Scientology empire, and its current chairman, David Miscavige, is widely recognized as the effective head of the church.

— Hugh Urban

The main types of organizations within the Scientology network are:

- Service organizations are the public-facing organizations
- Management organizations
- Publishing and media organizations
- Dissemination organizations such as marketing and outreach.

== Service organizations ==
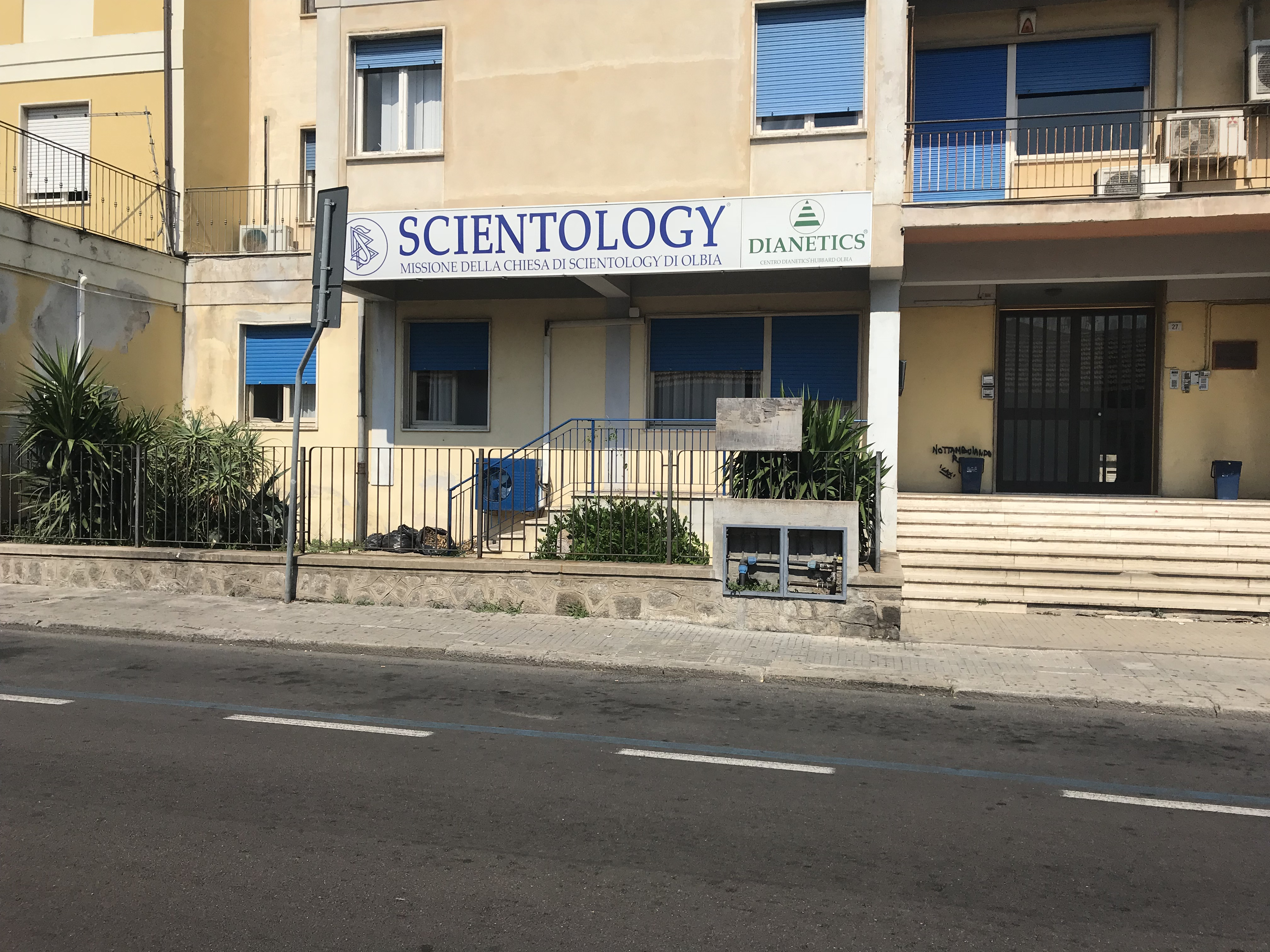
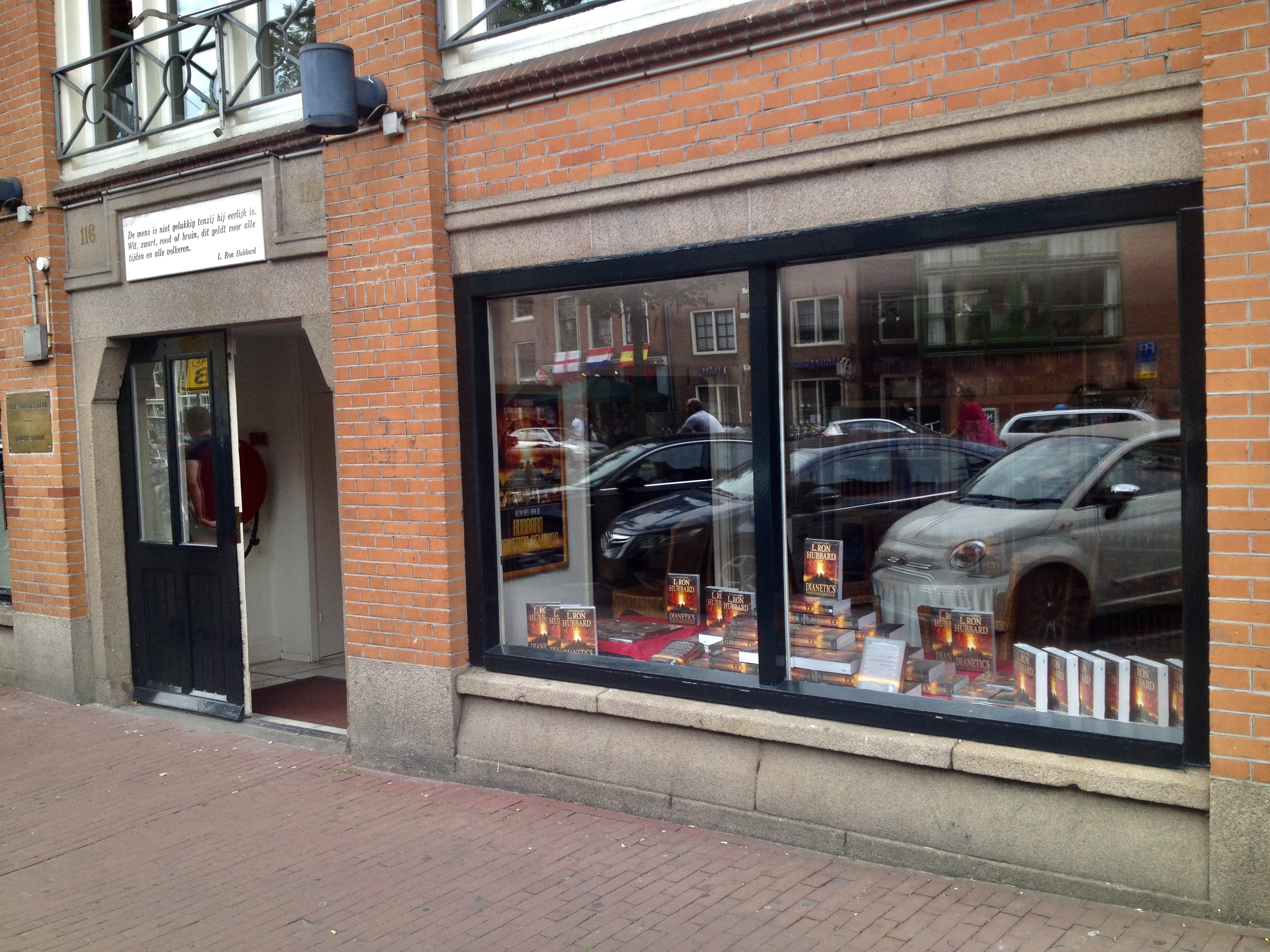
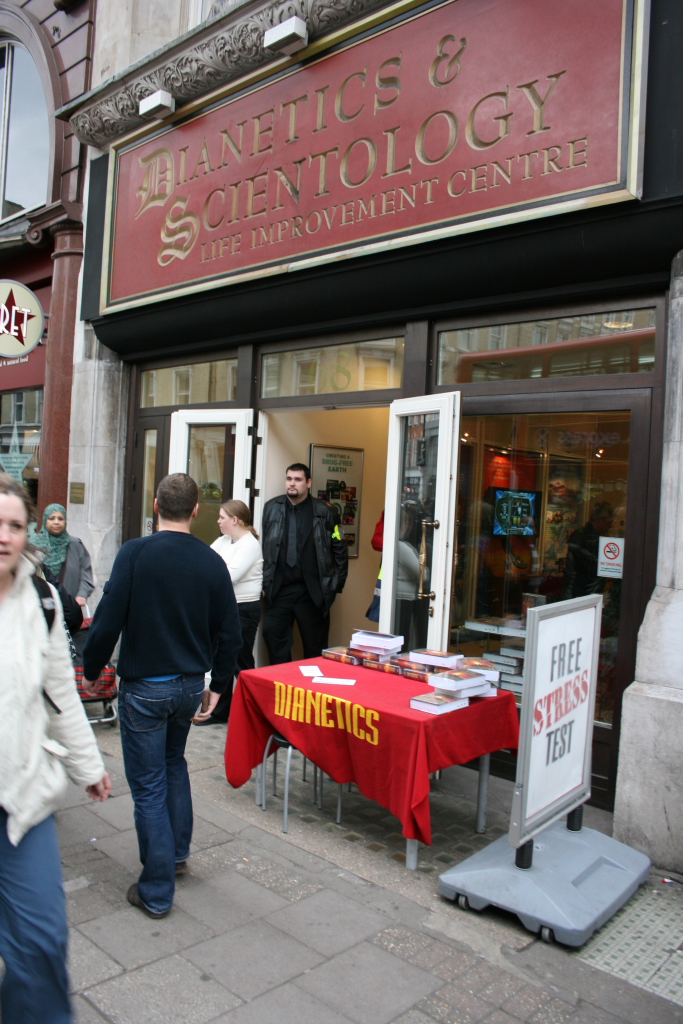
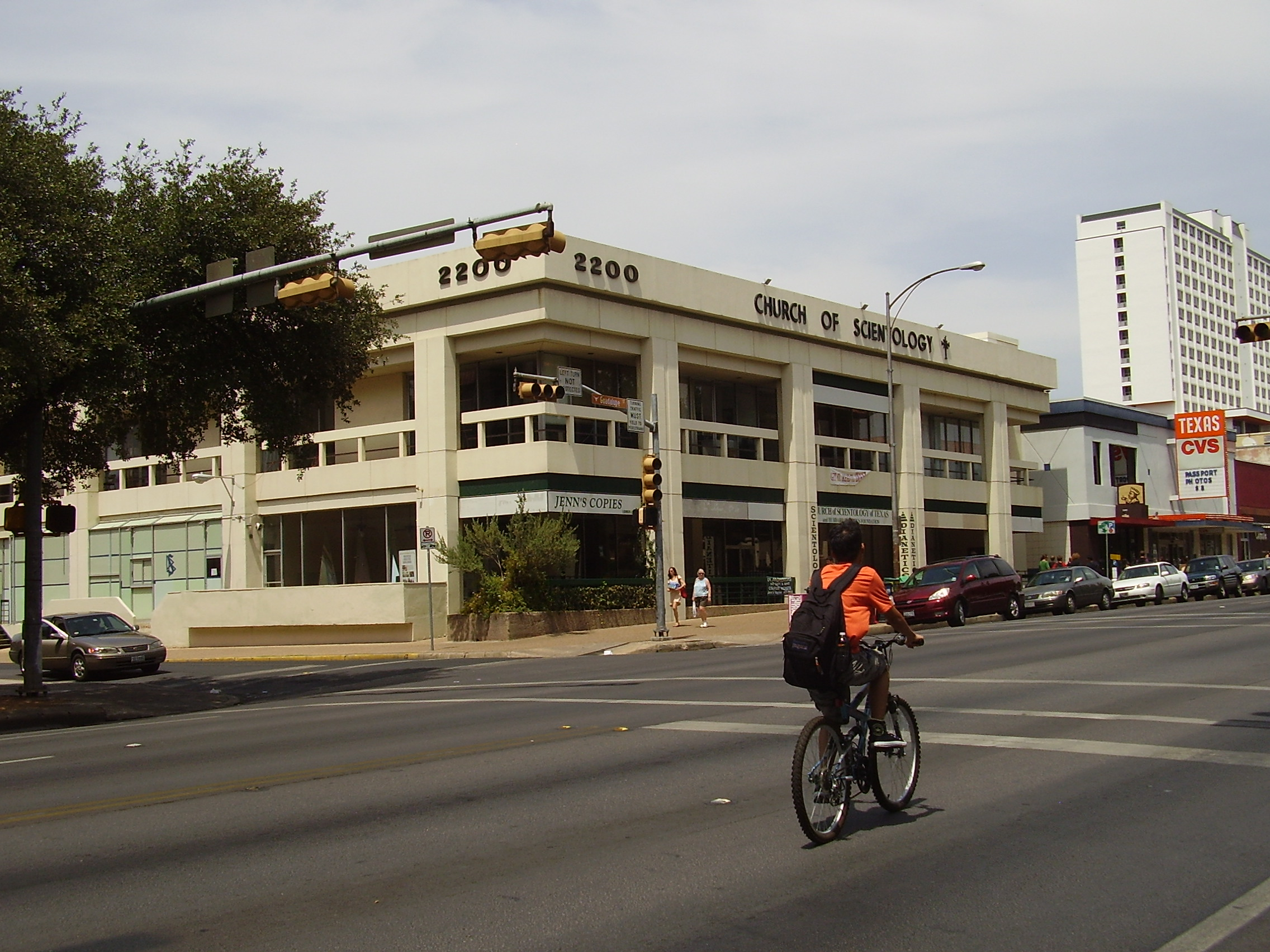
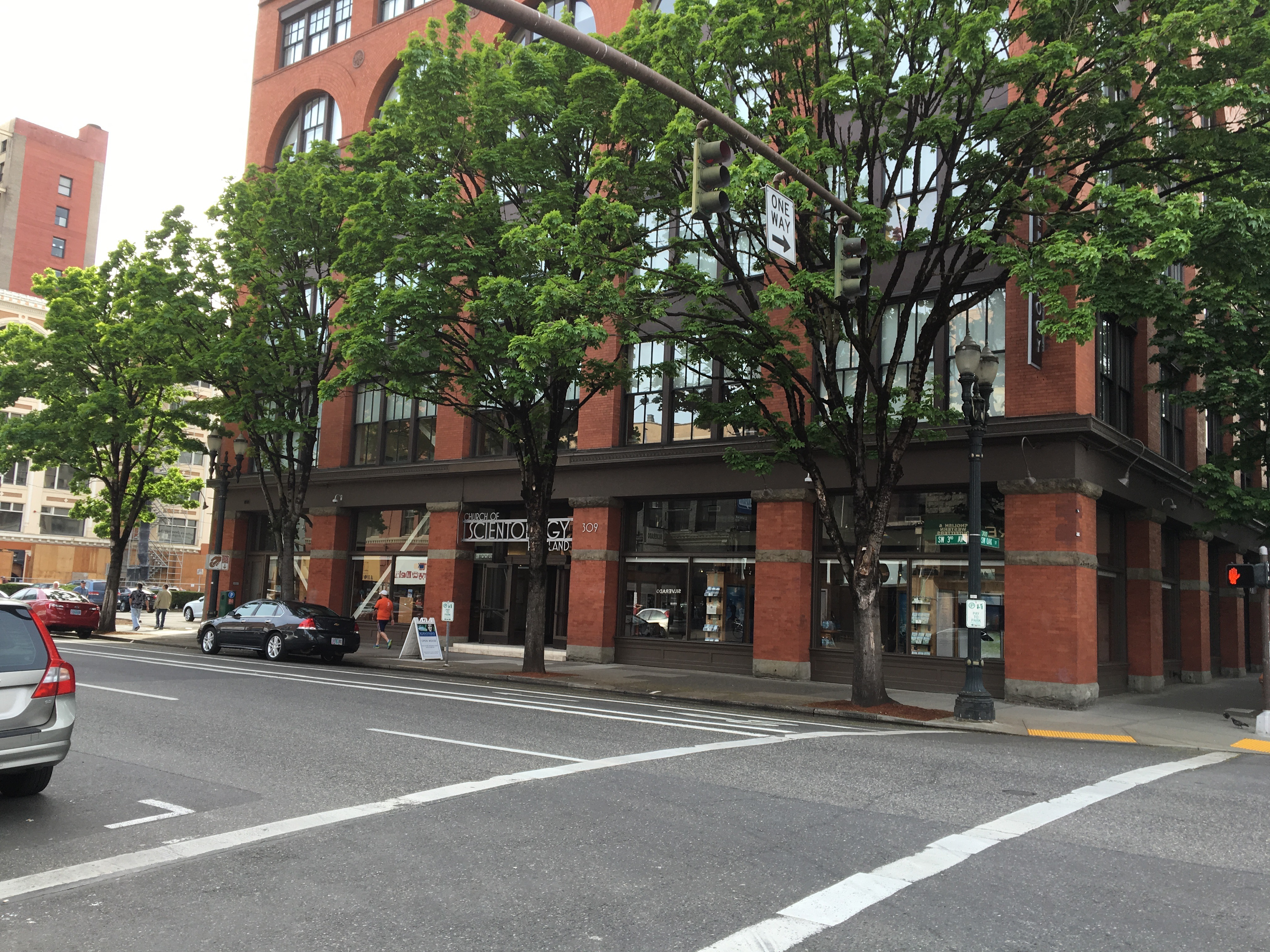
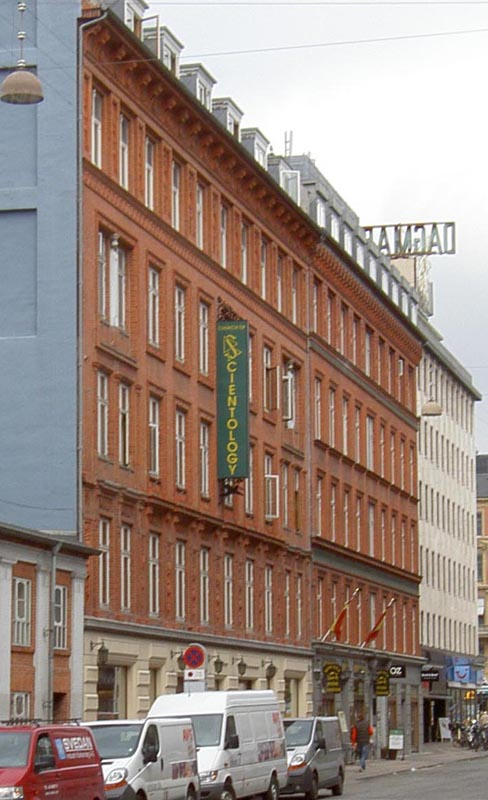
A mission, a Dianetics center, a life improvement center, a Class V org, an Ideal org, an advanced org

Church of Scientology organizations that are public-facing are called "service orgs". The two main types of services offered to the public are auditing and auditor training. Auditing is the 'counseling', and training teaches how to audit. The levels of auditing and training are charted and described on The Bridge to Total Freedom. All service organizations are separate corporate entities, are licensed as franchises, and pay a percentage of their gross revenues to International Management. By 2011, the Church was claiming over 700 centers in 65 countries. Hubbard's image and writing are prominent in service orgs, and each maintains a corporate-style office set aside for Hubbard's reincarnation, with a plaque on the desk bearing his name, and a pad of paper with a pen for him to continue writing.

Missions of Scientology
Missions are the smallest service organizations, and they operate as independent franchises. They are owned by a "mission holder" and licensed to operate by Scientology Missions International which receives 10% tithes and supervises them. Missions offer beginning services to newcomers to Scientology, then push their clients to higher level service orgs, for which they earn a commission. Missions are not financially supported by the central organization, and must purchase a Mission Starter Package, which in 2011 cost $35,000 (equivalent to $63,600 in 2025), and purchase all subsequent material from the main organization.

Scientology Life Improvement Centers and Dianetics Centers
These centers are operated by a local Church of Scientology and are small "store front" locations with the purpose of selling books and offering very basic services to get people interested in Scientology.

Central org, Class V org
This organization is what most people think of as "a Church of Scientology". It offers a full range of auditing and auditor training services up to the level of Clear on The Bridge to Total Freedom. They were called Class V orgs because the auditor training level up to Clear was called the "Class V auditor course".

Ideal org
An Ideal Org is a special class of Class V org where a new large building has been acquired, renovated, and outfitted to David Miscavige's "ideal org" standards.

Saint Hill org and Advanced org
A Saint Hill org is a type of service org which trains up through the Class VI course—the Saint Hill Special Briefing Course. Named after Saint Hill Manor. An Advanced org offers the advanced levels above Clear, including the OT levels I through V. Several organizations operate the function of a Saint Hill org coupled with an Advanced org in a single corporation, such as: East Grinstead, United Kingdom; Copenhagen, Denmark; Johannesburg, South Africa; and Sydney, Australia. Los Angeles, California has a separate Saint Hill org and an Advanced org.

Flag Service Org (FSO)
Also known as "Flag". Located in the Clearwater, Florida campus, audits specialty rundowns such as the Super Power Rundown and the L's rundowns. It is also the chief training organization for Class V org staff to train for their posts (these students are called "outer org trainees"). FSO also operates an Advanced org which offers the OT levels VI and VII, and trains Sea Org staff for the confidential upper levels to audit and supervise others on OT levels V-VIII.

Flag Ship Service Org (FSSO)
The name of the service org that operates aboard the Freewinds ship in the Caribbean. It offers the OT level VIII.

== Management organizations ==
All Scientology management organizations are controlled exclusively by members of the Sea Org — which is not a corporation — consisting of the most dedicated core of Scientologists. David Miscavige is described as the highest-ranking Sea Org officer.

The Church of Scientology International (CSI) is officially the "mother church", and is responsible for guiding the other Scientology centers.

The Church of Spiritual Technology (CST) is the organization that owns all the copyrights of the estate of L. Ron Hubbard.

There are numerous other management organizations, including the Commodore's Messenger Organization, Watchdog Committee, Continental Liaison Offices, and the organizations that manage the dissemination and outreach activities.

In the 1950s and 1960s, management was operated from the Hubbard Association of Scientologists International (HASI), and from 1966 until the 1980s it was the Church of Scientology of California (CSC).

=== Sea Org ===
The Sea Organization or Sea Org is the senior-most status of staff within the Church of Scientology network of corporations, but it is not itself incorporated. In the 1960s and 1970s, the Sea Org was started as L. Ron Hubbard's private navy (Note: Scholars describe the early Sea Org as Hubbard's "private navy" because it operated from a fleet of ships and adopted naval-style ranks, uniforms, and shipboard discipline. The term reflects the organization's maritime setting and symbolic structure, not a military function; the Sea Org did not possess weapons, combat roles, or the characteristics of an armed force.) and adopted naval uniforms and ranks. Today, all Scientology management organizations are exclusively staffed with Sea Org members. The Sea Org maintains strict codes for its members, beginning with a billion-year pledge of service to Scientology upon initiation. David Miscavige, the leader of Scientology, is the highest-ranking Sea Org officer, with the rank of captain. The higher rank of commodore is permanently reserved for the reincarnation of the late L. Ron Hubbard, founder of Scientology. Some ex-members and scholars have described the Sea Org as a totalitarian organization marked by intensive surveillance, lack of freedom, forced labor, and punishments.

=== Religious Technology Center (RTC) ===
The highest authority in the Church of Scientology network is Religious Technology Center (RTC). The RTC claims to only be the "holder of Scientology and Dianetics trademarks", but is in fact the main Scientology executive organization. RTC chairman David Miscavige is widely seen as the effective head of Scientology.

Religious Technology Center is the organization at the top of the Scientology hierarchy. RTC was established in 1982, and controls the Dianetics and Scientology trademarks. In 1987, David Miscavige took over control of RTC and is the head of RTC; officially Chairman of the Board, or COB. RTC employs lawyers and has pursued individuals and groups who have legally attacked Scientology or who are deemed to be a legal threat to Scientology. This has included breakaway Scientologists who practice Scientology outside the central organization, and critics, as well as numerous government and media organizations.

=== Scientology Missions International ===
Scientology Missions International is the management organization over the mission network. Missions are small Scientology organizations which recruit new people and deliver basic services and auditing. These were the feeder organizations which sent people into the main Scientology orgs. Previously called franchises and running semi-autonomously under the wing of the Guardian's Office, they were considered "Scientology's life blood" until David Miscavige and his International Finance Police gutted the network in the early 1980s. Missions were operated by a mission holder who paid 10% license fees to the Church of Scientology but kept the bulk of their income to themselves.

The new policy was that missions paid a higher percentage to the new Scientology Missions International (SMI), established 1981, and anyone who objected was declared suppressive and their bank accounts seized. Hundreds of mission holders lost or closed their missions and in 1983 there were just forty missions left in the US. Until the 1990s, few people opened new missions and the push was directed towards celebrities to open missions: Kirstie Alley opened a mission in Wichita, Kansas in 1995, Isaac Hayes and Lisa Marie Presley opened one in Memphis in 1997, and Jenna Elfman opened one in San Francisco in 2001. According to the Church of Scientology, by 2002 there were 197 missions in the US, and by 2008 there were internationally 3,200 missions across 129 countries.

(Note: A Sea Org missionaire is a person with a job completely unrelated to the mission network.)

== Publishing and media organizations ==
=== Golden Era Productions ===
Golden Era Productions is a 500+ acre property in California also known as Gold Base, occupied by the Church of Scientology since 1979. It is where they make Scientology films, reproduce audio recordings of Hubbard's lectures, and assemble E-meters.

=== Scientology Media Productions and Scientology Network ===
In 2011, the Church of Scientology purchased KCET-TV's studio facilities. After five years of renovations and upgrades, the 4.5-acre property was reopened in 2016 as "Scientology Media Productions". The facilities included "three soundstages, postproduction tools, control rooms, music studios, mixing rooms, art departments, scene shops, radio booths, screening rooms, a magazine production space, a live-events hub" and 136,000 square feet of space. In 2018, they launched the Scientology Network.

=== Bridge Publications and New Era Publications ===
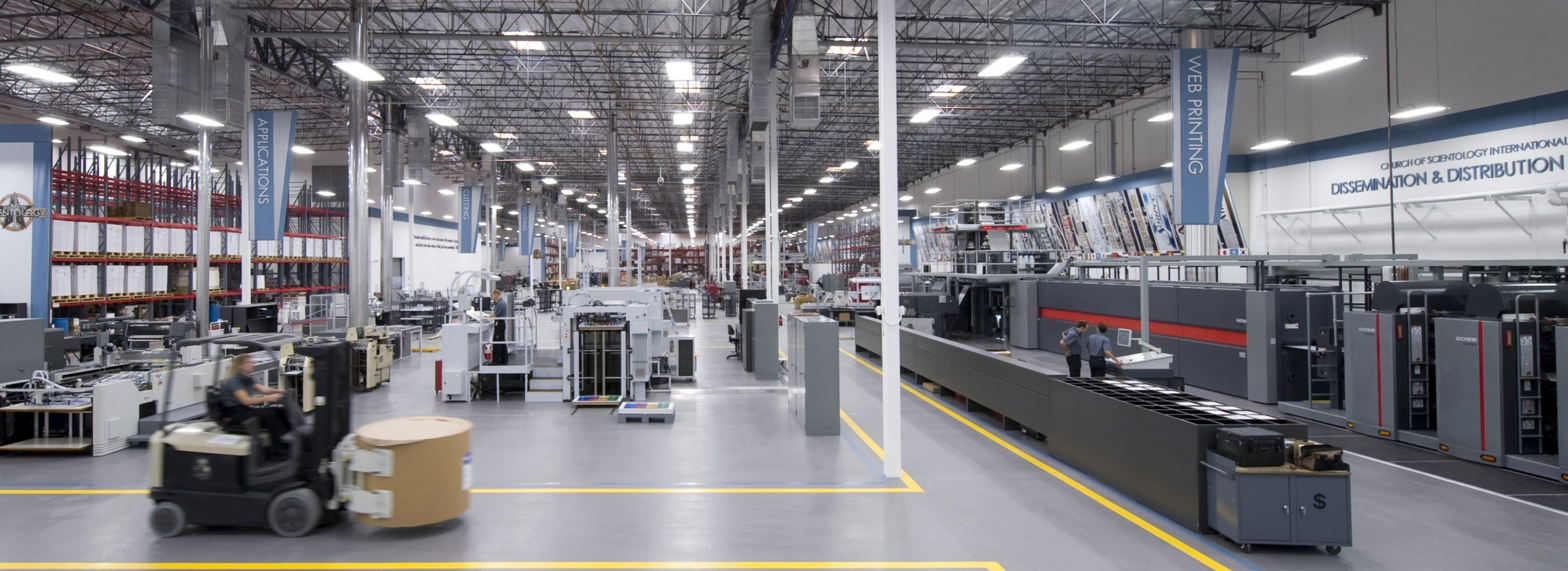
Print and distribution center, California

Bridge Publications, Inc. (incorporated 1981 in California) is the publisher for Scientology books and magazines in the United States, and New Era Publications International, Aps is the publisher in Europe.

Former publishing organizations include Distribution Center Inc. (Maryland 1955), Publications Organization United States (California 1971), and Scientology Publications Limited (UK 1991).

As of 2023, the print and distribution center for Bridge Publications is located at 5600 E Olympic Blvd, Commerce, California, occupies 185,000 square feet, and prints the organization's magazines and other Scientology materials. The center's press has the capacity to print 55,000 pages per hour. The warehousing and shipping department is fully automated, with the capability of handling half a million items per week.

There are several imprints across the entire Scientology network which are printed at the main print center, including Effective Education Publishing, Freedom Publishing, and Galaxy Press.

=== Author Services Inc. and Galaxy Press ===
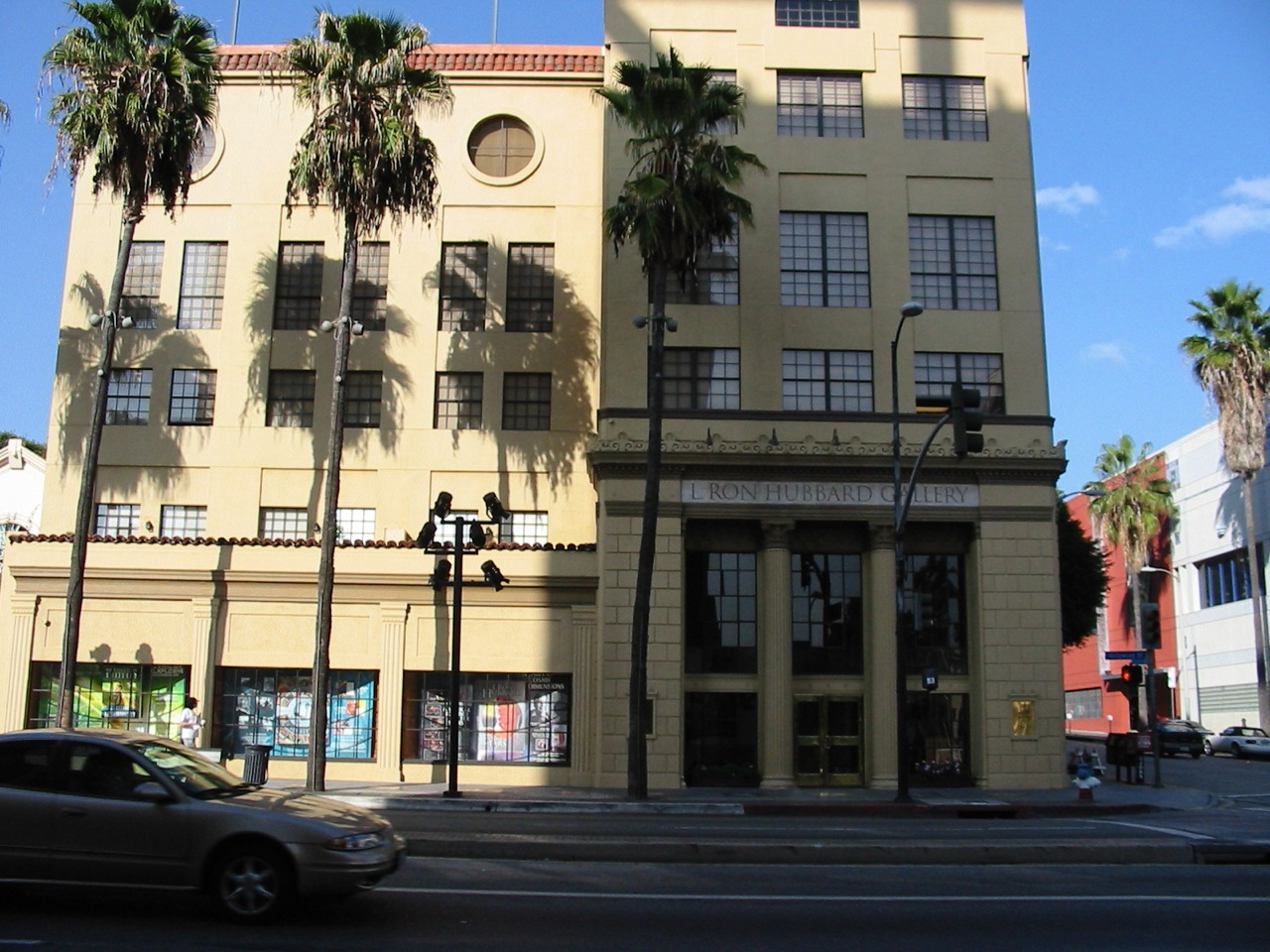
Author Services building

Author Services Inc. (ASI) represents the literary, theatrical and musical works of L. Ron Hubbard. It is wholly owned by Church of Spiritual Technology. Author Services runs the contests Writers of the Future and Illustrators of the Future. Galaxy Press is an imprint of Author Services, spun off from Bridge Publications in 2002. Author Services and Galaxy Press are located at 7051 Hollywood Blvd, Hollywood, CA.

== Dissemination organizations ==
There are many independently chartered organizations and groups which are staffed by Scientologists, and pay license fees for the use of Scientology technology and trademarks under the control of Scientology management. In some cases, these organizations do not publicize their affiliation with Scientology and operate as front groups. According to Reitman, "The use of social reform groups to spread L. Ron Hubbard's ideas had long been an integral part of Scientology [...] since the late 1960s, the church has disseminated its philosophy through a number of organizations with hidden ties to Scientology".

=== Association for Better Living and Education (ABLE) ===
Founded in 1989, the Association for Better Living and Education (ABLE) is an umbrella organization that administers six of Scientology's social programs:

- Applied Scholastics, educational programs based on Hubbard's "Study Tech".
- Criminon prisoner rehabilitation programs.
- International Foundation for Human Rights and Tolerance, which has a particular interest in religious freedom.
- Narconon drug rehabilitation centers.
- The Way to Happiness Foundation, dedicated to disseminating Hubbard's non-religious moral code.
- Youth for Human Rights International, the youth branch of The Way to Happiness.

=== Citizens Commission on Human Rights (CCHR) ===
The Citizens Commission on Human Rights is an anti-psychiatry lobby organization whose stated mission is to "eradicate abuses committed under the guise of mental health." It operates the Psychiatry: An Industry of Death exhibit which is open to the public in CCHR's building on Sunset Boulevard. It has been described by critics as a Scientology front group.

=== Volunteer Ministers ===
The Church of Scientology began its "Volunteer Ministers" program as a way to participate in community outreach projects. Volunteer Ministers travel to the scenes of major disasters to provide assistance with relief efforts. According to critics, these relief efforts consist of passing out copies of a pamphlet authored by Hubbard entitled The Way to Happiness, and engaging in a method said to calm panicked or injured individuals known in Scientology as a "touch assist". Accounts of the Volunteer Ministers' effectiveness have been mixed, and touch assists are not supported by scientific evidence.

=== World Institute of Scientology Enterprises (WISE) ===
Many other Scientologist-run businesses and organizations belong to the umbrella organization World Institute of Scientology Enterprises (WISE), which licenses the use of Hubbard's management doctrines, and circulates directories of WISE-affiliated businesses. WISE requires those who wish to become Hubbard management consults to complete training in Hubbard's administrative systems; this training can be undertaken at any Church of Scientology, or at one of the campuses of the Hubbard College of Administration, which offers an Associate of Applied Science Degree:

- One of the best-known WISE-affiliated businesses is Sterling Management Systems, which offers Hubbard's management "technology" to professionals such as dentists and chiropractors.
- Another well-known WISE-affiliated business is e.Republic, a publishing company based in Folsom, California. e.Republic publications include Government Technology and Converge magazines. The Center for Digital Government is a division of e.Republic that was founded in 1999.
- Internet ISP EarthLink was founded by Scientologists Sky Dayton and Reed Slatkin as a Scientology enterprise. The company now distances itself from the views of its founder, who moved on to become CEO of Helio (wireless carrier), formerly known as SK-EarthLink.

=== Front groups ===
Scientology front groups are organizations named or operated in such a way as to disguise their association with the Church of Scientology. The Church uses front groups as a public relations tool, to introduce its ideas and techniques into society by presenting a neutral or secular face to gain access to audiences that would reject Scientology branding. These groups are also used to recruit new members, and to advance the Church's political interests. Time magazine reported that the Church attracts "the unwary through a wide array of front groups in such businesses as publishing, consulting, health care and even remedial education." Many of the groups are founded on pseudoscience, named disingenuously, and underplay their links to Scientology and L. Ron Hubbard.

== Bases and campuses ==
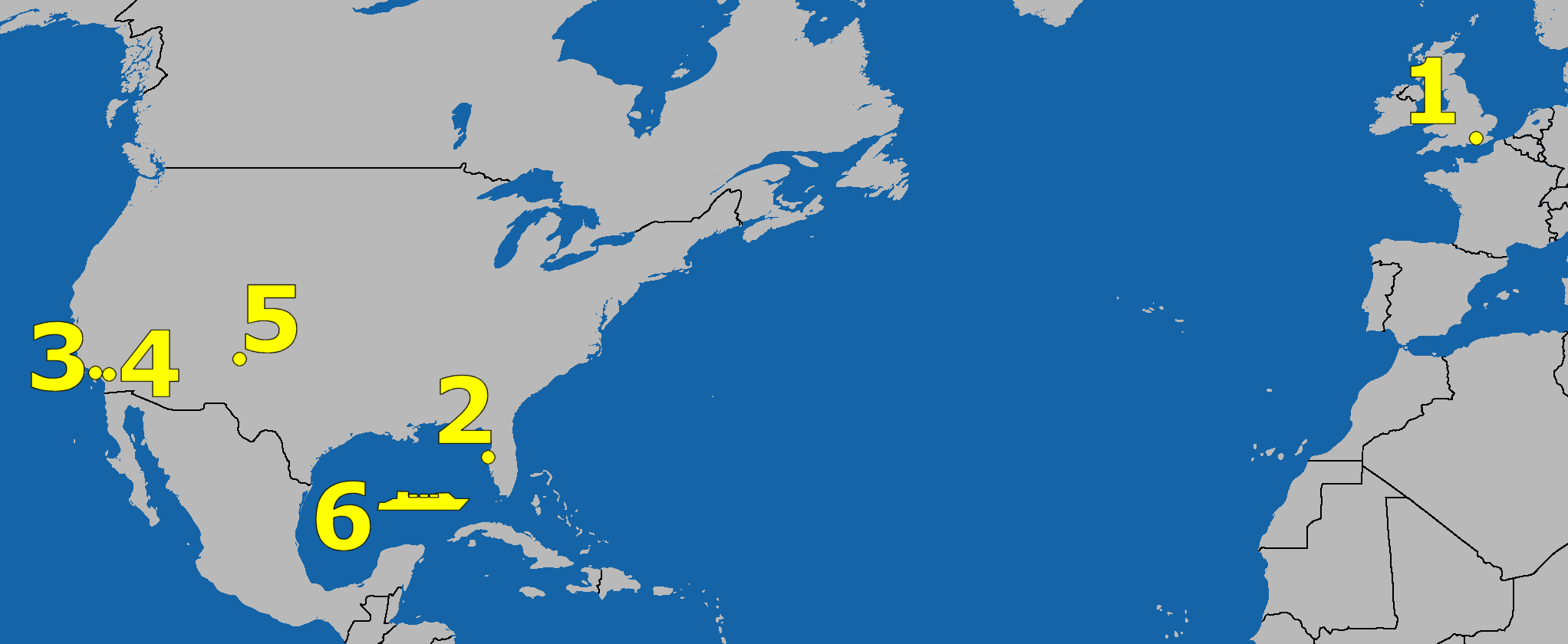
Locations of major Scientology centers in the United States and the United Kingdom: 1. Saint Hill Manor 2. Flag Land Base 3. PAC Base 4. Gold Base 5. Trementina Base 6. Flag ship, Freewinds

The church owns a staggering array of properties, from a college on 55 acres in England to a luxury cruise ship. The church often buys historic buildings and refurbishes them in grand fashion. —St. Petersburg Times, 2009

=== Saint Hill, England ===
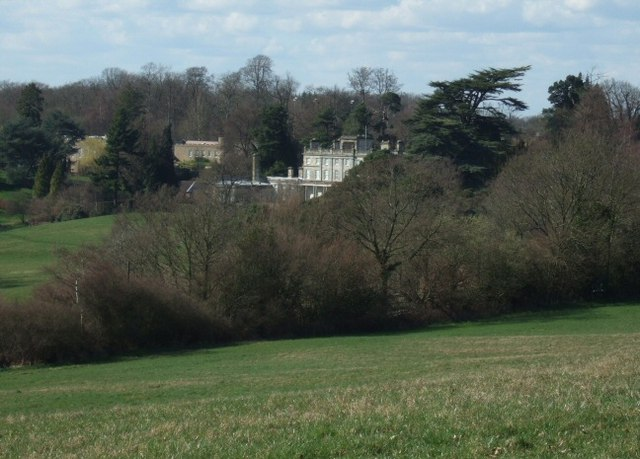
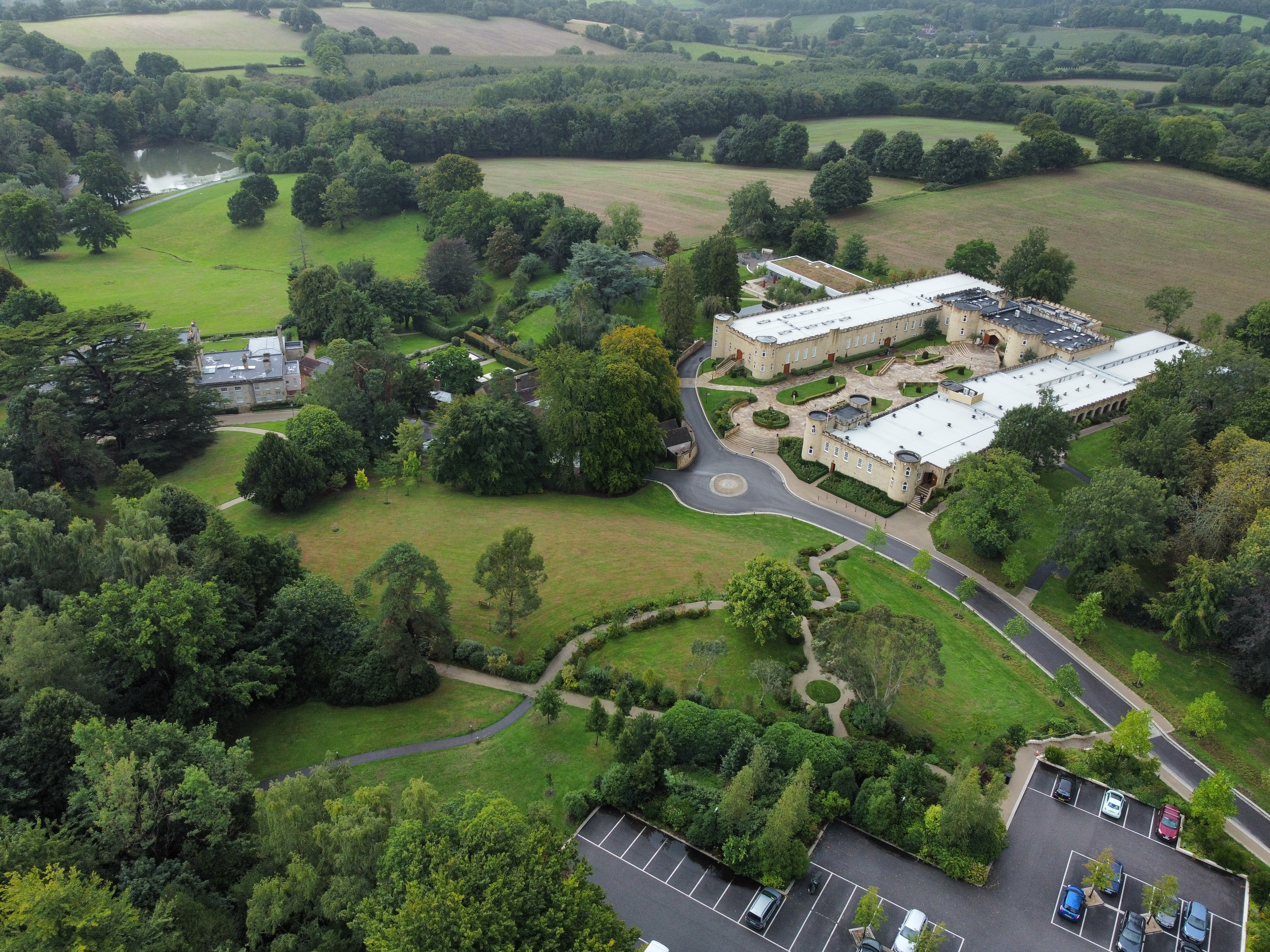
Some of the Saint Hill campus

Hubbard moved to England shortly after founding Scientology, where he oversaw its worldwide development from an office in London for most of the 1950s. In 1959, he bought Saint Hill Manor, a Georgian manor house near the Sussex town of East Grinstead. During Hubbard's years at Saint Hill, he traveled extensively, providing lectures and training in Australia, South Africa in the United States, and developing materials that would eventually become Scientology's "core systematic theology and praxis". While in Saint Hill, Hubbard worked with a staff of nineteen and urged others to join. On September 14, 1959, he wrote: "Here, on half a hundred acres of lovely grounds in a mansion where we have not yet found all the bedrooms, we are handling the problems of administration and service for the world of Scientology. We are not very many here and as the sun never sets on Scientology we are very busy thetans."

The most important achievement of the Saint Hill period was Hubbard's execution of the Saint Hill Special Briefing Course (SHBC). It was delivered by Hubbard from March 1951 to December 1966 and, within the Church of Scientology, is considered the best training course for budding "auditors" in the organization. Scientology groups called "Saint Hill Organizations" located in Los Angeles, Clearwater (Florida), Copenhagen and Sydney still teach this course.

This became the worldwide headquarters of Scientology through the 1960s and 1970s. Hubbard declared Saint Hill to be the organization by which all other organizations would be measured, and he issued a general order (still followed today) for all organizations around the world to expand and reach "Saint Hill size". The Church of Scientology has announced that the next two levels of Scientology teaching, OT IX and X, will be released and made available to the organization's members when all the major organizations in the world have reached Saint Hill size.

=== Flag Land Base, Clearwater, Florida ===
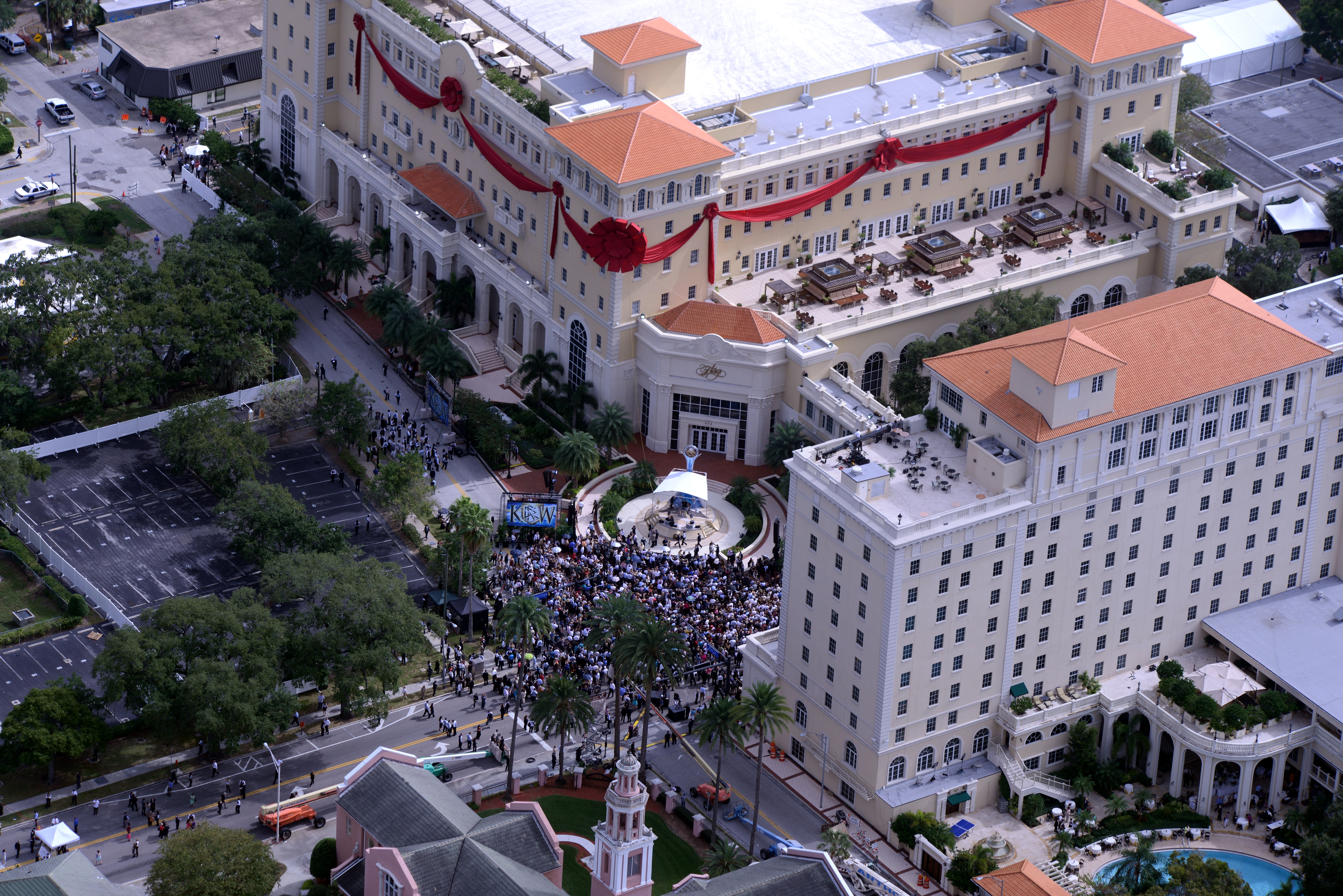
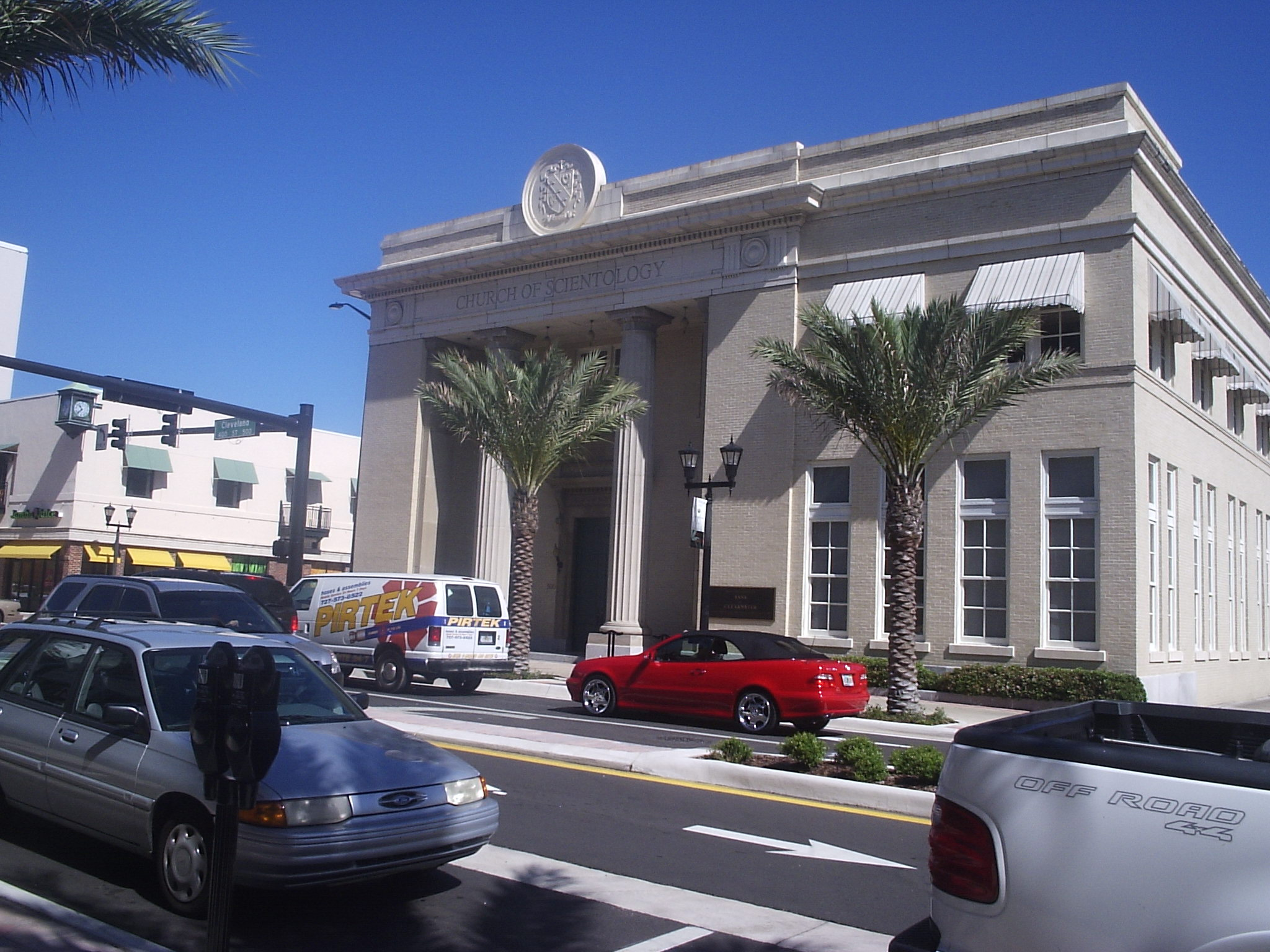
Some of the Flag Land Base buildings: The Super Power Building (top, background) and Fort Harrison Hotel (top, foreground), Clearwater Bank building (bottom)

The "worldwide spiritual headquarters" of the Church of Scientology is known as Flag Land Base, located in Clearwater, Florida. It is operated by Church of Scientology Flag Service Organization, Inc., a Florida corporation.

The organization was founded in 1975 when a Scientology-founded group called "Southern Land Development and Leasing Corp" purchased the Fort Harrison Hotel for $2.3 million. Because the reported tenant was the "United Churches of Florida" the citizens and City Council of Clearwater did not realize that the building's owners were actually the Church of Scientology until after the building's purchase. Clearwater citizens' groups, headed by Mayor Gabriel Cazares, rallied strongly against Scientology establishing a base in the city (repeatedly referring to the organization as a cult), but Flag Base was established nonetheless.

In the years since its foundation, the Flag Land Base has expanded as the Church of Scientology has gradually purchased large amounts of additional property in the downtown and waterfront Clearwater area. Scientology's largest project in Clearwater has been the construction of a high-rise complex called the "Super Power Building", or Flag Building, which "is the centerpiece of a 160-million construction campaign."

The Church of Scientology's CST chairman of the board, David Miscavige, led the opening and dedication of the 377,000-square-foot Flag Building on November 17, 2013. The multi-million cathedral is the new spiritual headquarters of Scientology. The fifth and sixth floor contain the "Super Power Program", which includes specially designed machines that Scientologists believe allow users to develop new abilities and experience enlightenment. The building also includes a dining facility, course rooms, offices and small rooms for "auditing" purposes.

=== PAC Base and Hollywood, California ===
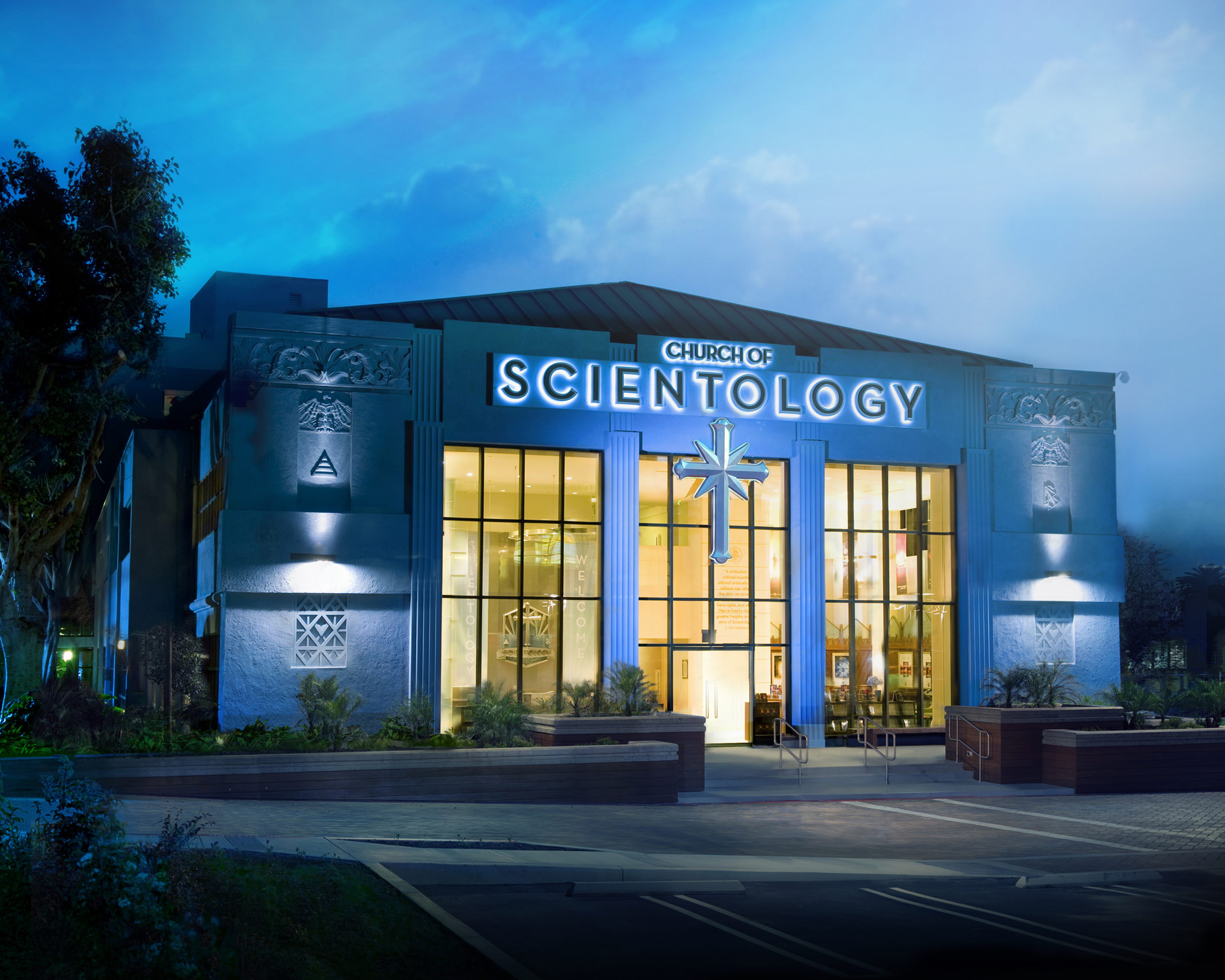
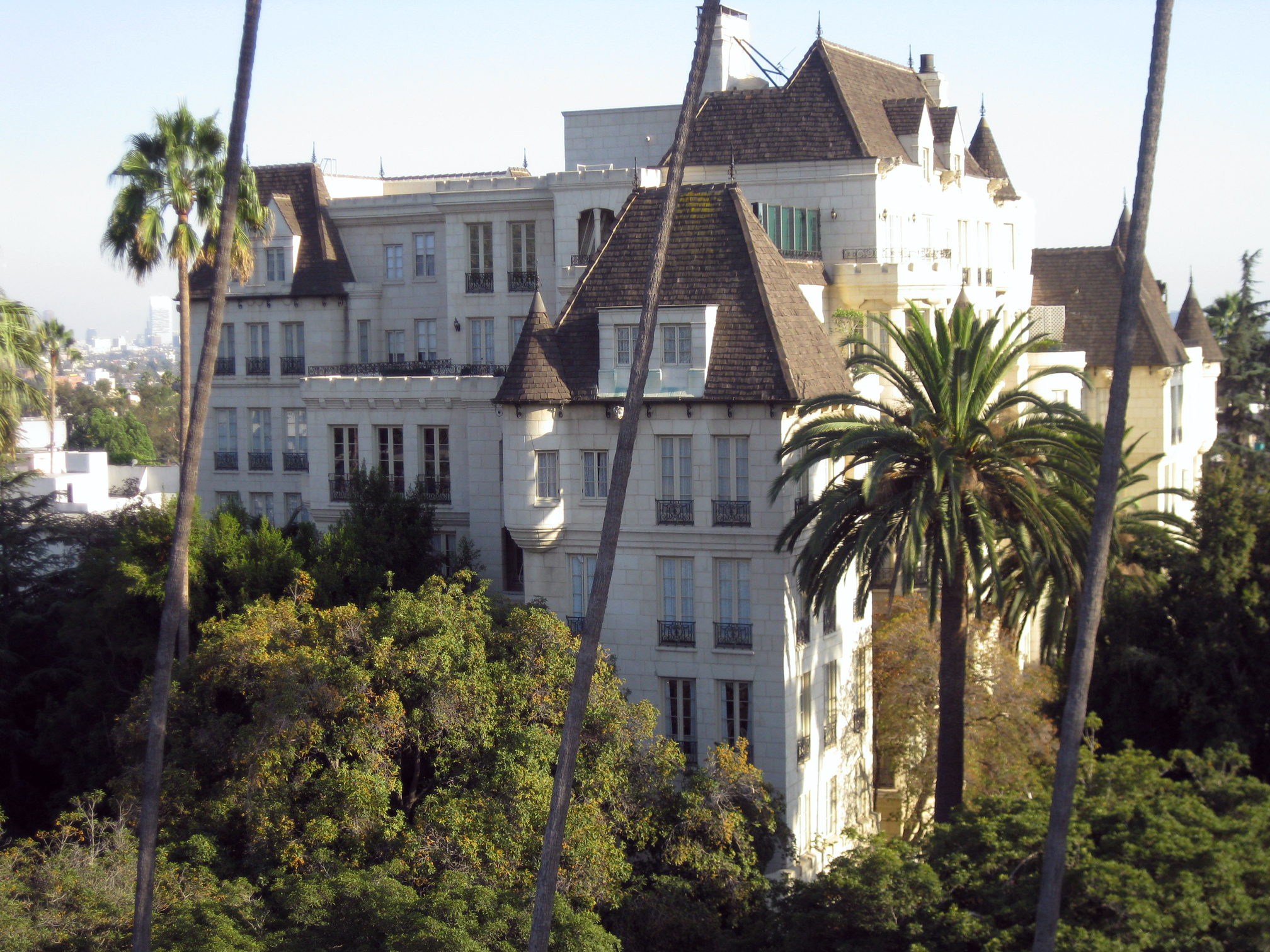
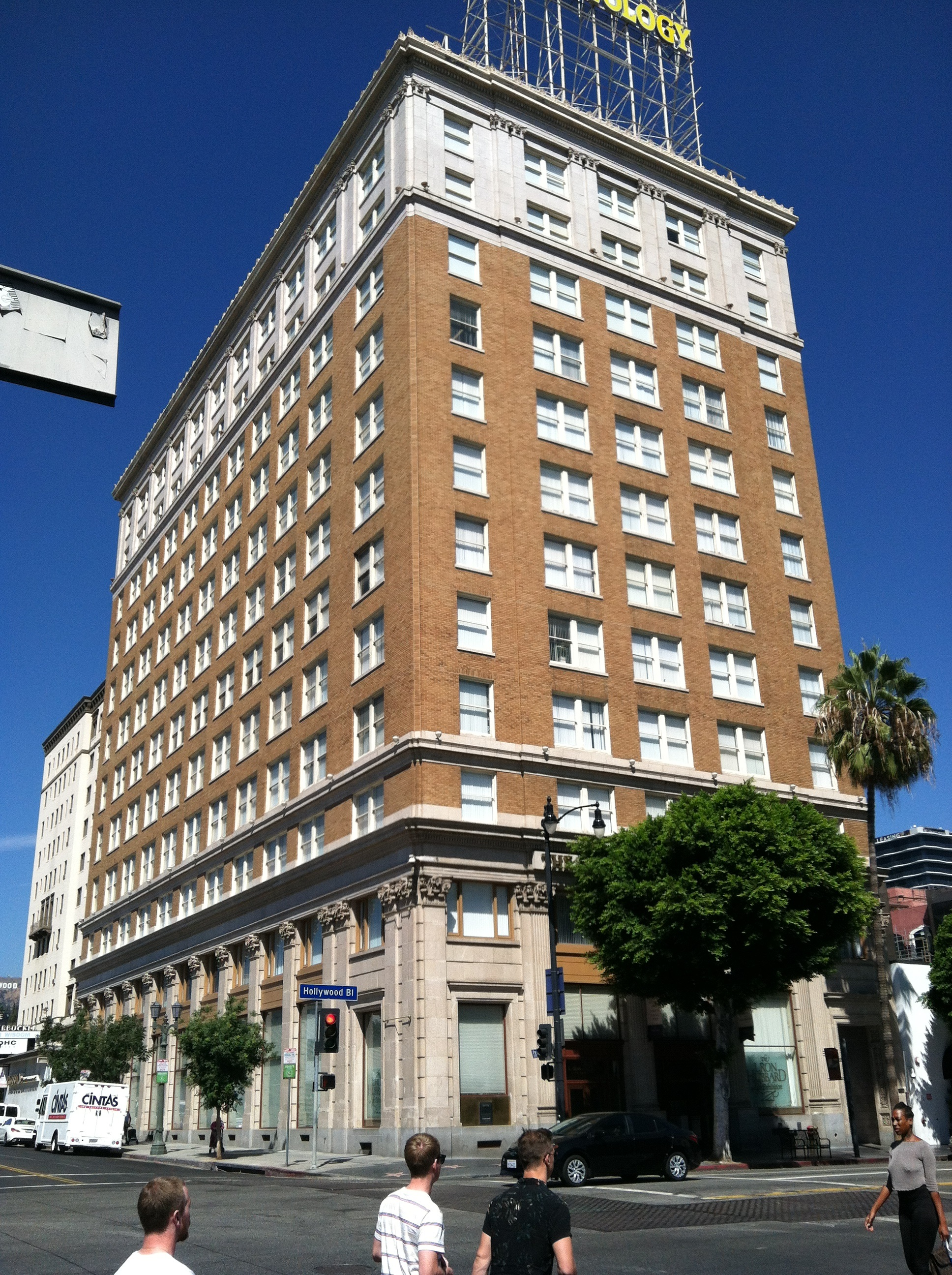
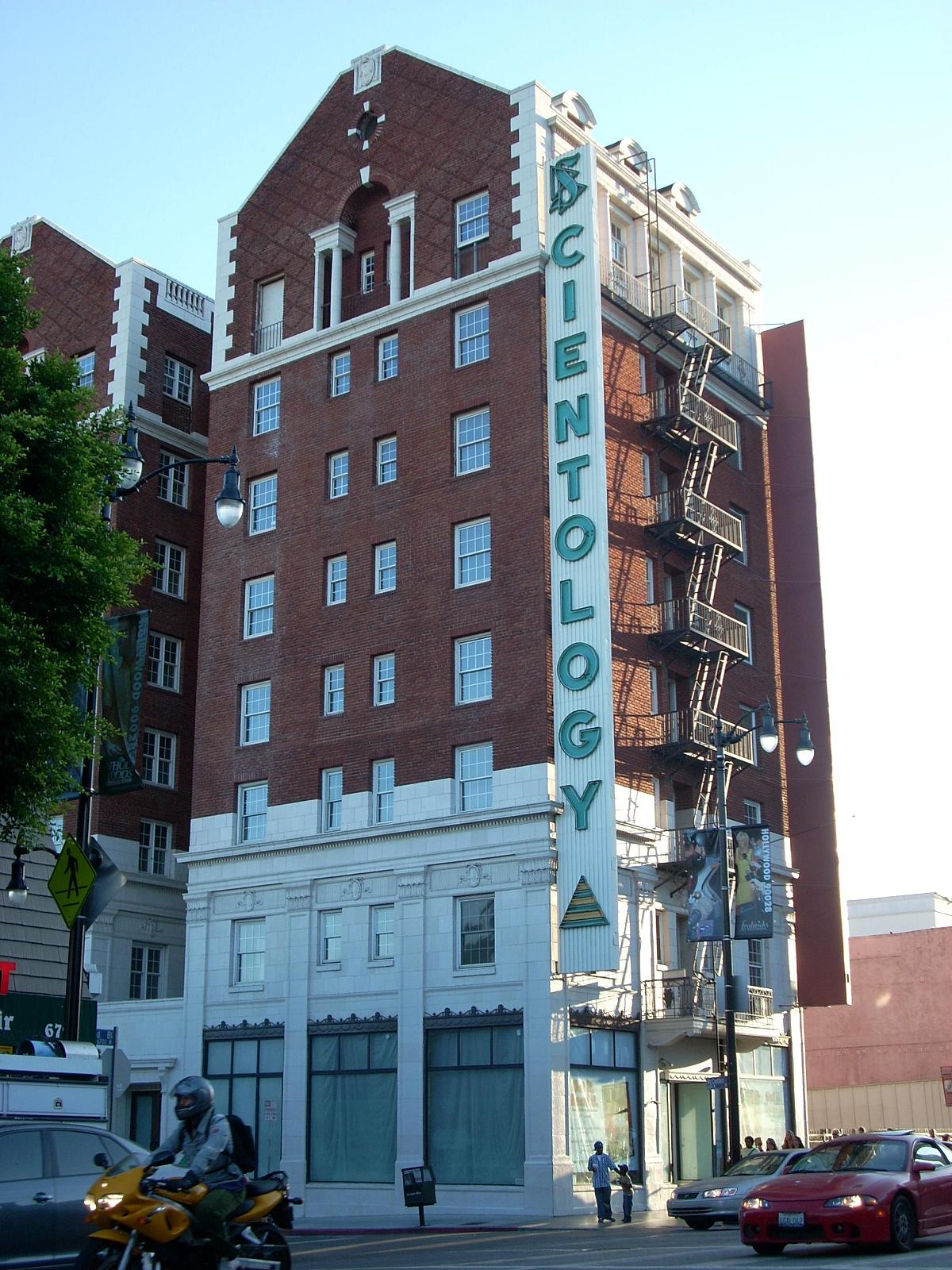
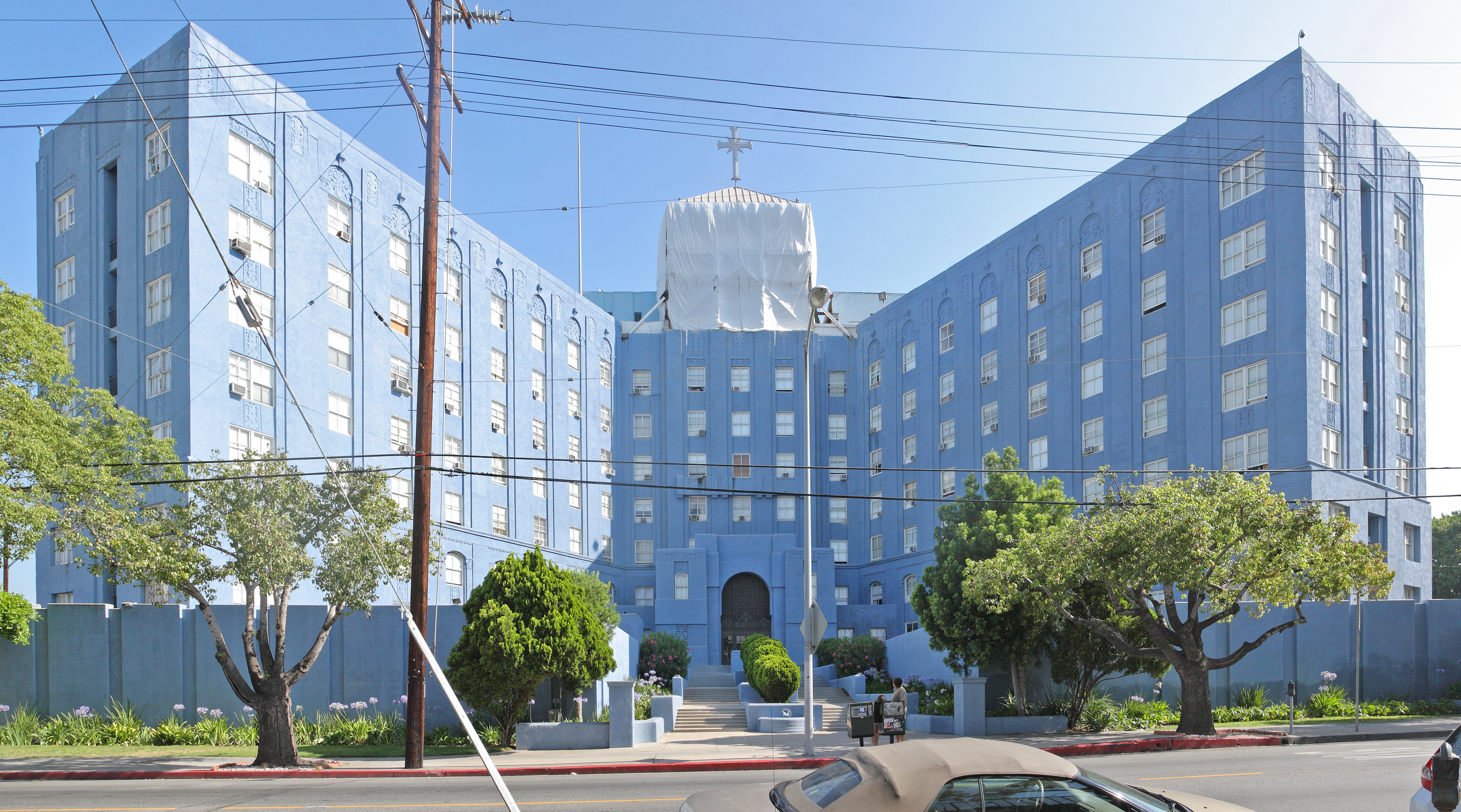
Los Angeles Org, Celebrity Centre, Hollywood Guaranty Building, Information Center, "Big Blue"

Los Angeles, California has the largest concentration of Scientologists and Scientology-related organizations in the world, with the Church of Scientology's most visible presence being in the Hollywood district of the city. The organization owns a former hospital on Fountain Avenue which houses Scientology's West Coast headquarters, the Pacific Area Command Base – often referred to as "PAC Base" or "Big Blue", after its blue paint job. Adjacent buildings include headquarters of several internal Scientology divisions, including the American Saint Hill Organization, the Advanced Organization of Los Angeles, and the Church of Scientology of Los Angeles. All these organizations are integrated within the corporation Church of Scientology Western United States. The Church of Scientology successfully campaigned to have the city of Los Angeles rename one block of a street running through their complex "L. Ron Hubbard Way". The street has been paved in brick.

Scientology's Celebrity Center International is located on Franklin Avenue, while the Association for Better Living and Education, Author Services, the Test Center, and the official headquarters of the Church of Scientology International (in the Hollywood Guaranty Building) are all located on Hollywood Boulevard. The ground floor of the Guaranty Building also features the L. Ron Hubbard Life Exhibition, a museum detailing his life that is open to the general public. The Celebrity Centre was acquired by the organization as the Chateau Elysee in 1973, built to accommodate members in the arts, sports and government.

=== Gold Base, Riverside County, California ===
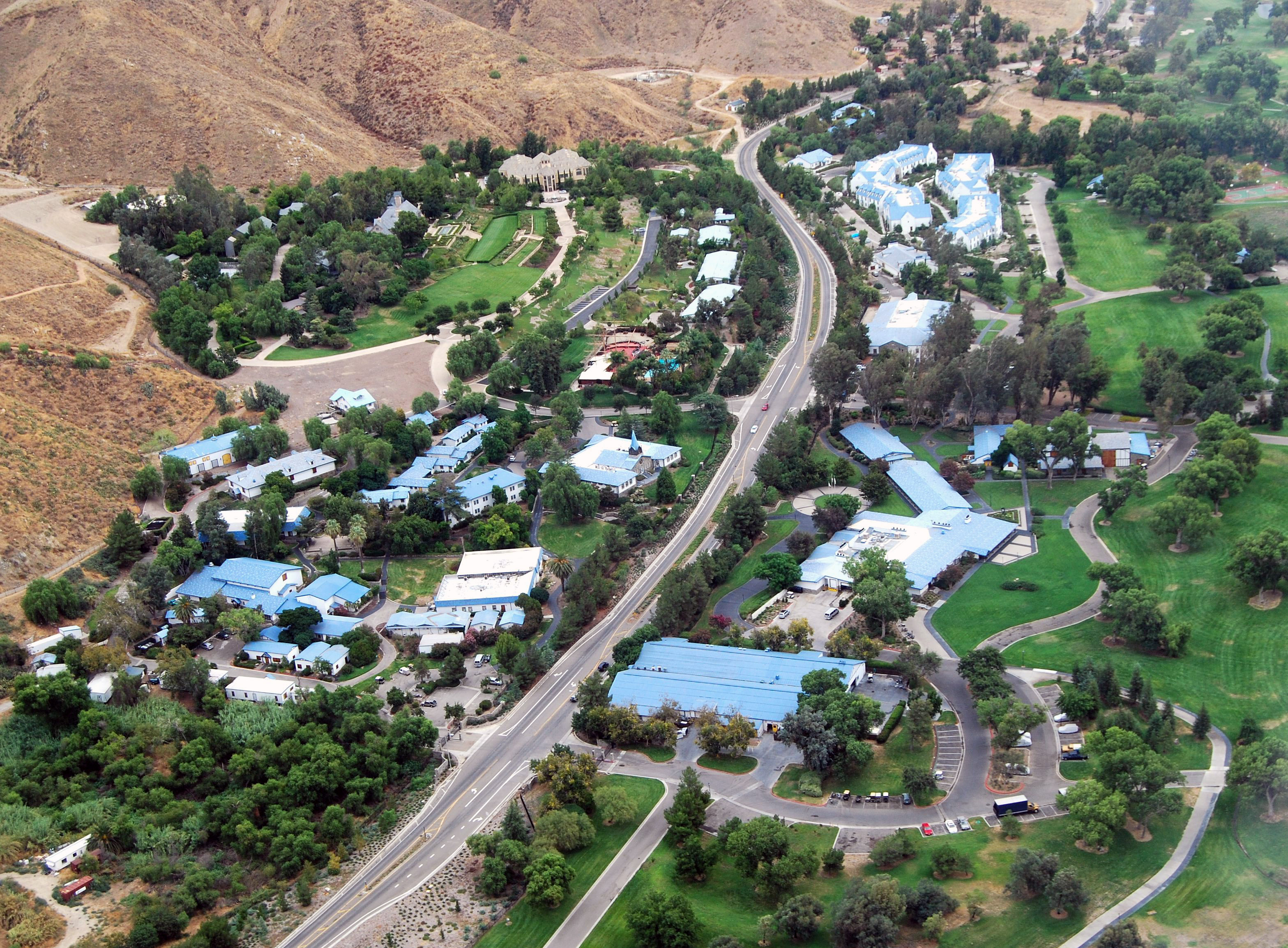
Gold Base aerial view from west

The headquarters of Religious Technology Center, the entity that oversees Scientology operations worldwide, is located in unincorporated Riverside County, California, near the city of San Jacinto. The facility, known as Gold Base or "Int", is owned by Golden Era Productions and is the home of Scientology's media production studio, Golden Era Studios. Several Scientology executives, including David Miscavige, live and work at the base. Therefore, Gold Base is Scientology's international administrative headquarters.

The Church of Scientology bought the former Gilman Hot Springs resort, which had been popular with Hollywood figures, in 1978; the resort became Gold Base. The facilities are surrounded by floodlights and video observation cameras, and the compound is protected by razor wire.

=== Trementina Base, New Mexico ===
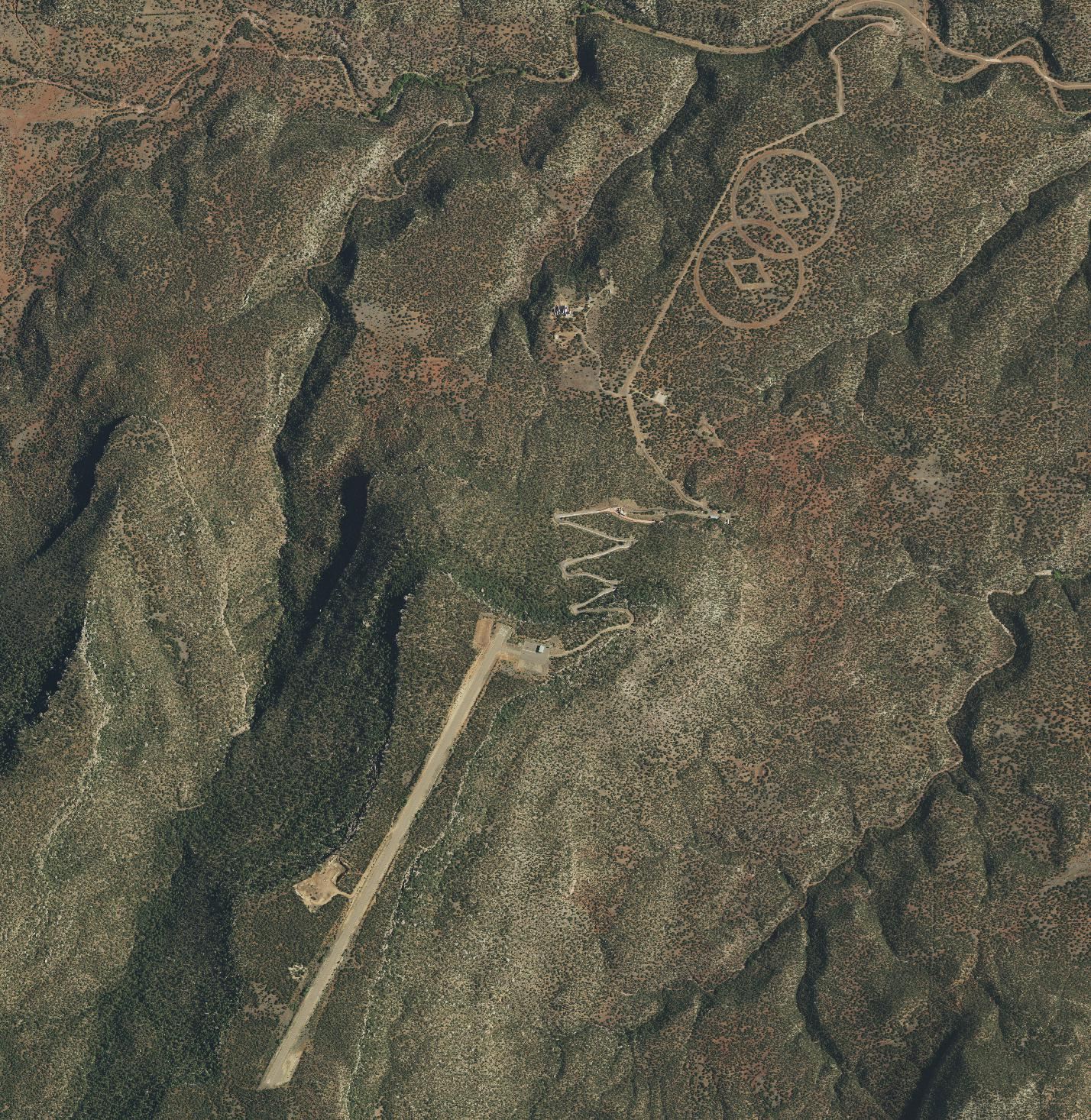
Trementina Base

The Church of Scientology maintains a large base on the outskirts of Trementina, New Mexico, for the purpose of storing their archiving project: engraving Hubbard's writings on stainless steel tablets and encasing them in titanium capsules underground. An aerial photograph showing the base's enormous Church of Spiritual Technology symbols on the ground caused media interest and a local TV station broke the story in November 2005. According to a report in The Washington Post, the organization unsuccessfully attempted to coerce the station not to air the story.

== Finances ==
In 2008, the Church of Scientology and its large network of corporations, nonprofits and other legal entities were estimated to bring in around 500 million US dollars in annual revenue. According to 2011 tax documents, the Church of Scientology International and Church of Spiritual Technology in the US had a combined $1.7 billion in assets. Scientologists can attend classes, exercises or counseling sessions for a set range of "fixed donations"; however, membership without courses or auditing is possible. According to a sociological report entitled "Scientology: To Be Perfectly Clear", progression between levels above "clear" status cost $15,760.03 in 1980 (equivalent to $61,583 in 2025). Scientologists can reduce their costs by co-auditing with another student.

Critics say it is improper to fix a donation for religious service; therefore the activity is non-religious. Scientology points out many classes, exercises and counseling may also be traded for "in kind" or performed cooperatively by students for no cost, and members of its most devoted orders can make use of services without any donations bar that of their time. A central tenet of Scientology is its doctrine of exchange, which dictates that each time a person receives something, he or she must give something back. By doing so, a Scientologist maintains "inflow" and "outflow", avoiding spiritual decline.

== Ideal Orgs ==
Starting in 2003 Miscavige began pressuring local Churches of Scientology to purchase larger facilities to use as Scientology centers which would be renovated to become "Ideal Orgs". The theory was "If you build it they will come." This push has included the acquisition of many historic buildings, a plan which professor of religious studies Hugh Urban believes has been pursued to imbue the Church with historical significance and distract from its controversies. For renovations of these buildings, the Church of Scientology has relied heavily on manual labor from Sea Org members in the organization's Rehabilitation Project Force. As of 2018, the Church of Scientology claims it had purchased 70 buildings and opened 60 Ideal Orgs around the globe.

With its membership numbers dwindling, Scientology's ideal org campaign has been called "a real estate scam", a "money-making scam", and "Scientology's principle cash cow". Scientologists were heavily pressured during lengthy fundraising sessions to donate all their money and even open new credit lines to help fund the several million dollar building purchases. This resulted in less money to spend on normal services like training and auditing, so the new orgs became desolate. Staff pay, which is dependent upon weekly org income, was often reduced to a few dollars a week. A 2010 survey of former Scientologists by former Church of Scientology executive Mike Rinder found that the most cited reason for leaving the Church was the unrelenting pressure to donate to programs such as the Ideal Org program.

Some of the buildings purchased for Ideal Orgs remained vacant and unrenovated for years. For example, in the UK, delayed Ideal Orgs included Birmingham (purchased in 2007 and finally opened in 2017), Gateshead (purchased 2007), Manchester (purchased 2006), and Plymouth (purchased 2009). The delays prompted calls from locals for a compulsory purchase of the historically significant buildings, which had remained largely vacant and undeveloped since their purchase.

== Membership statistics ==
A Scientologist is a person who adheres to the beliefs and practices of Scientology, a movement founded by L. Ron Hubbard in the mid-20th century. The term is used for individuals who participate in Scientology services or training offered by the Church of Scientology, whether as public members or as part of the organization's staff. Estimates of the number of Scientologists vary widely, with the Church claiming worldwide membership in the millions, while national censuses and independent surveys indicate global totals in the tens of thousands.

== Celebrities ==
In order to facilitate the continued expansion of Scientology, the organization has made efforts to win allies in the form of powerful or respected people. Scientology has had a written program governing celebrity recruitment since at least 1955, when L. Ron Hubbard created "Project Celebrity", offering rewards to Scientologists who recruited targeted celebrities, and another church document pointed to the importance of "using Scientology celebrities to mold the opinions of their publics." According to Robert Vaughn Young, "one of my jobs was to get celebrities active, to convince them to hustle and promote Scientology." The Church of Scientology operates Celebrity Centres for the use of artists, politicians, leaders of industry, sports figures, and other prominent individuals.

== Controversy ==
Though it has attained some credibility as a religion in many countries, Scientology has also been described as both a cult and a commercial enterprise. Some of the organization's actions also brought scrutiny from the press and law enforcement. For example, it has been noted to engage in harassment and abuse of civil courts to silence its critics, by identifying as fair game people it perceives as its enemies.

In 1979, several Scientology members were convicted for their involvement in the organization's Operation Snow White, the largest theft of government documents in U.S. history. Scientologists were also convicted of fraud, manslaughter and tampering with witnesses in French cases, malicious libel against lawyer Casey Hill and espionage in Canada.

In his book World Religions in America, religious scholar Jacob Neusner states that Scientology's "high level of visibility" may be perceived as "threatening to established social institutions". The film Going Clear, based on the book by the same name, also documents controversies surrounding the organization and its treatment of former members.

Criticism has also come from within the Church. Marty Rathbun, the former inspector general of the Religious Technology, has spoken out against church activities. He has called for a "Scientology Reformation" to eliminate corruption and bring back the original teachings of L. Ron Hubbard.

=== Classification ===
From 1952 until 1966, Scientology was administered by an organization called the Hubbard Association of Scientologists (HAS), established in Arizona on September 10, 1952. In 1954, the HAS became the HASI (HAS International). The Church of Scientology was incorporated in California on February 18, 1954, changing its name to "The Church of Scientology of California" (CSC) in 1956. In 1966, Hubbard transferred all HASI assets to CSC, thus gathering Scientology under one tax-exempt roof. In 1967, the IRS stripped all US-based Scientology entities of their tax exemption, declaring the organization's activities were commercial and operated for the benefit of Hubbard. Controversy followed the organization in those years, but its growth continued in the 1960s. New facilities were formed in Paris (1959), Denmark (1968), Sweden (1969), and Germany (1970). In the 1970s the religion spread through Europe: in Austria (1971), Holland (1972), Italy (1978), and Switzerland (1978). Centers of Scientology were in 52 countries by the time the 80s came in and grew to 74 by 1992.

The organization sued and lost repeatedly for 26 years trying to regain its tax-exempt status. The case was eventually settled in 1993, at which time the organization paid $12.5 million to the IRS—greatly less than IRS had initially demanded—and the IRS recognized the organization as a tax-exempt nonprofit organization. In addition, Scientology also dropped more than fifty lawsuits against the IRS when this settlement was reached. Scientology cites its tax exemption as proof the United States government accepts it as a religion. In January 2009, removal of the tax exemption was rated as number 9 in items for the incoming Barack Obama administration to investigate, as determined in an internet poll run by the presidential transition team soliciting public input for the incoming administration. The U.S. State Department has criticized Western European nations for discrimination against Scientologists in its published annual International Religious Freedom report, based on the International Religious Freedom Act of 1998.

In some countries, such as Israel, Scientology is treated legally as a commercial enterprise, and not as a religion or charitable organization. In early 2003, in Germany, The Church of Scientology was granted a tax-exemption for the 10% license fees sent to the US. This exemption, however, is related to a German-American double-taxation agreement, and is unrelated to tax-exemption in the context of charities law. Unlike many well-established religious organizations, Scientology maintains strict control over its names, symbols, religious works and other writings. The word Scientology (and many related terms, including L. Ron Hubbard) is a registered trademark. Religious Technology Center, the owner of the trademarks and copyrights, takes a hard line on people and groups who attempt to use it in ways unaffiliated with the Church of Scientology (see Scientology and the legal system).

=== Illegal activities ===
L. Ron Hubbard appointed Mary Sue Hubbard to take control of certain aspects of legal protection for the organization in 1968, and the Office of The Guardian was created with its head office situated at Saint Hill Manor. Under The Guardian's Office (later renamed the Office of Special Affairs or OSA), organization members and contracted staff later organized and committed one of the largest penetrations of United States federal agencies ever perpetrated by an organization not affiliated with a foreign government (that is, one such as the KGB). This operation was named Operation Snow White by Hubbard. In the trial which followed the discovery of these activities the prosecution described their actions as such:

The crime committed by these defendants is of a breadth and scope previously unheard of. No building, office, desk, or file was safe from their snooping and prying. No individual or organization was free from their despicable conspiratorial minds. The tools of their trade were miniature transmitters, lock picks, secret codes, forged credentials and any other device they found necessary to carry out their conspiratorial schemes.

The organization has also in the past made use of aggressive tactics in addressing those it sees as trying to suppress them, known as Suppressive Persons (SPs) first outlined by Hubbard as part of a policy called fair game. It was under this policy that Paulette Cooper was targeted for having authored The Scandal of Scientology, a 1970 exposé book about the organization and its founder. This action was known as Operation Freakout. Using blank paper known to have been handled by Cooper, Scientologists forged bomb threats in her name. When fingerprints on them matched hers, the Justice Department began prosecution, which could have sent Cooper to prison for a lengthy term. The organization's plan was discovered at the same time as its Operation Snow White actions were revealed. All charges against Cooper were dismissed, though she had spent more than $20,000 on legal fees for her defense.

In 1979, several executives of the organization were convicted and imprisoned for multiple offenses by a U.S. Federal Court.

On January 22, 2013, attorneys for the organization, as well as some of its members, reacted toward the CNN News Group for its airing of a story covering the release of a book published by a former member, entitled 'Going Clear', published earlier the same year. CNN News Group then chose to publish the reactionary correspondence, with confidential information redacted, on its web site.

According to a 1990 Los Angeles Times article, in the 1980s the Los Angeles branch largely switched from using the organization's members in harassment campaigns to using private investigators, including former and current Los Angeles police officers. The reason seemed to be that this gave the organization a layer of protection.

The Scientology organization has continued to aggressively target people it deems suppressive. In 1998, regarding its announcement that it had hired a private investigator to look into the background of a Boston Herald writer who had written a series on the organization, Robert W. Thornburg, dean of Marsh Chapel at Boston University, said, "No one I know goes so far as to hire outsiders to harass or try to get intimidating data on critics. Scientology is the only crowd that does that." It has apparently continued as recently as 2010. In 2007, when BBC journalist John Sweeney was making Scientology and Me, an investigative report about the organization, he was subjected to harassment:

In LA, the moment our hire car left the airport we realised we were being followed by two cars. In our hotel a weird stranger spent every breakfast listening to us.

Sweeney subsequently made a follow-up documentary, The Secrets of Scientology, in 2010 during which he was followed and filmed on multiple occasions and one of his interviewees was followed back to his home.

The Church of Scientology was convicted of fraud by a French court in 2009, a decision upheld by the supreme Court of Cassation in 2013.

=== Members' health and safety ===
The deaths of some Scientologists have brought attention to the organization, both due to the circumstances of their demises and their relationship with Scientology being a factor. In 1995, Lisa McPherson was involved in a minor automobile accident while driving on a Clearwater street. Following the collision, she exited her vehicle, stripped naked and showed further signs of mental instability, as noted by a nearby ambulance crew that subsequently transported her to a nearby hospital. Hospital staff decided that she had not been injured in the accident, but recommended keeping her overnight for observation. Following intervention by fellow Scientologists, McPherson refused psychiatric observation or admission at the hospital and checked herself out against medical advice after a short evaluation.

She was taken to the Fort Harrison Hotel, a Scientology retreat, to receive a treatment sanctioned by the organization called Introspection Rundown. She had previously received the Introspection Rundown in June of that year. She was locked in a room for 17 days, where she died. Her appearance after death was that of someone who had been denied water and food for quite some time, being both underweight and severely dehydrated. Additionally, her skin was covered with over one hundred insect bites, presumably from cockroaches. The state of Florida pursued criminal charges against the Church of Scientology. The organization has repeatedly denied any wrongdoing, and now makes members sign a waiver before Introspection Rundown specifically stating that they (or anyone on their behalf) will not bring any legal action against the organization over injury or death.

These charges attracted press coverage and sparked lawsuits. Eight years later, Elli Perkins, another adherent to Scientology's beliefs regarding psychiatry, was stabbed to death by her mentally disturbed son. Though Elli Perkins's son had begun to show symptoms of schizophrenia as early as 2001, the Perkins family chose not to seek psychiatric help for him and opted instead for alternative remedies sanctioned by Scientology. The death of Elli Perkins at the hands of a disturbed family member, one whose disease could have been treated by methods and medications banned by Scientology, again raised questions in the media about the organization's methods.

In addition, the organization has been implicated in kidnapping members who have recently left the organization. In 2007, Martine Boublil was kidnapped and held for several weeks against her will in Sardinia by four Scientologists. She was found on January 22, 2008, clothed only in a shirt. The room she was imprisoned in contained refuse and an insect infested mattress.

On Friday March 28, 2008, Kaja Bordevich Ballo, daughter of Olav Gunnar Ballo, Norwegian parliament member and vice president of the Norwegian Odelsting, took a Church of Scientology personality test while studying in Nice. Her friends and co-inhabitants claim she was in good spirits and showed no signs of a mental breakdown, but the report from the organization said she was "depressed, irresponsible, hyper-critical and lacking in harmony". A few hours later she committed suicide by jumping from her balcony at her dorm room leaving a note telling her family she was sorry for not "being good for anything". The incident has brought forward heavy criticism of the organization from friends, family and prominent Norwegian politicians. Inga Marte Thorkildsen, parliament member, went as far as to say "Everything points to the Scientology cult having played a direct role in making Kaja choose to take her own life".

=== Dissemination and recruiting practices ===
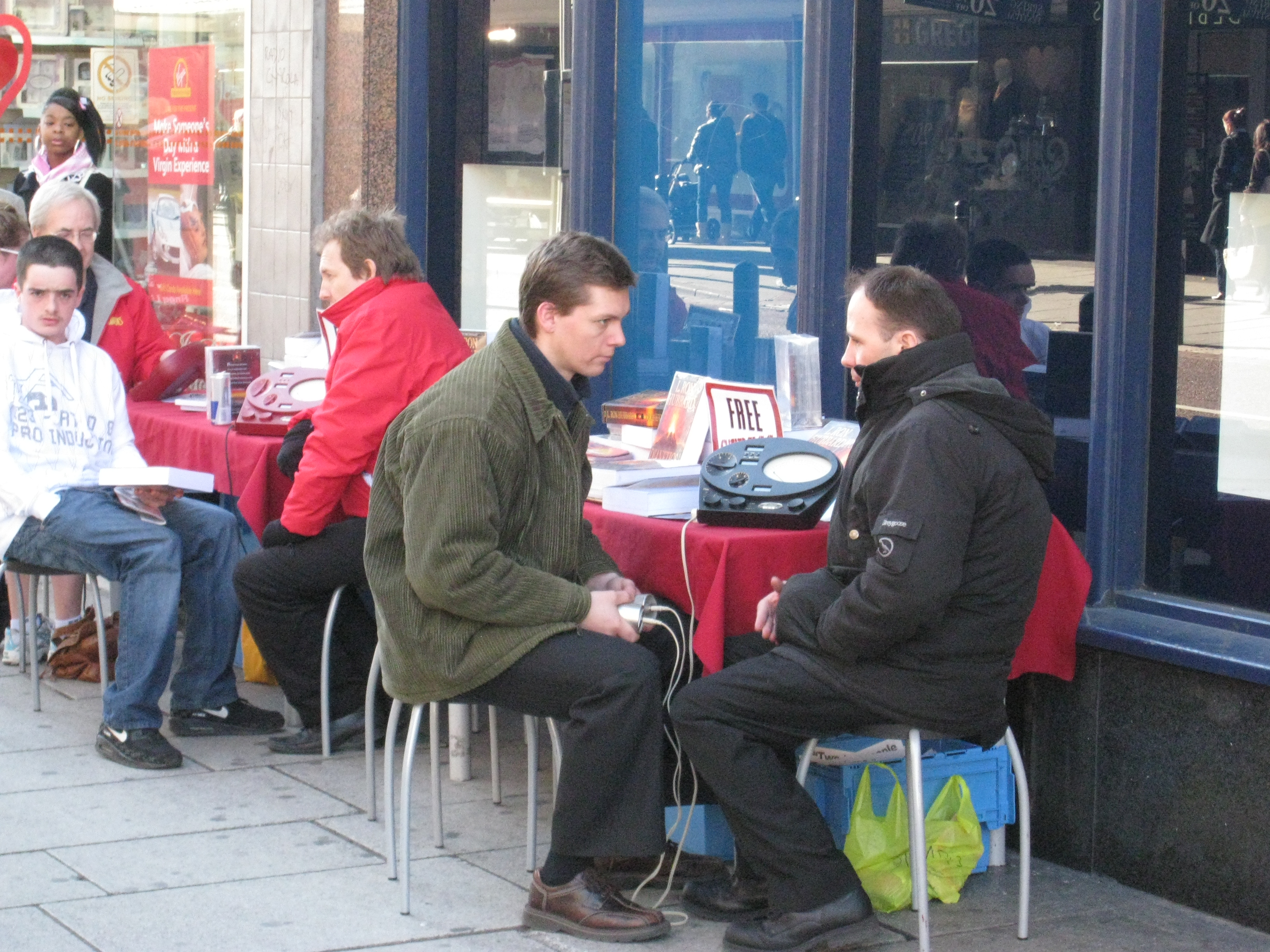
A Scientologist administers a stress test using an e-meter.

Members of the public entering a Scientology center or mission are offered a "free personality test" called the Oxford Capacity Analysis by Scientology literature. The test, despite its name and the claims of Scientology literature, has no connection to Oxford University or any other research body. Scientific research into three test results came to the conclusion that "we are forced to a position of skepticism about the test's status as a reliable psychometric device" and called its scientific value "negligible".

Further recruitment practices — called dissemination in Scientology – include information booths, flyers and advertisement for free seminars and Sunday Services in regular newspapers and magazines, personal contacts, sales of books, and acting classes.

=== Legal waivers ===
Working with lawyer Bill Drescher, we drafted and implemented one-sided agreements that everyone who partakes in scientology services is required to sign—forfeiting the right to sue and any rights to access the records of scientology services, and even giving scientology authorization to hold the signee against their will should they have a psychotic episode so they can participate in the Introspection Rundown.

— Mike Rinder

Due to previous litigation against the Church of Scientology, and particularly the civil and criminal cases surrounding the death of Lisa McPherson, COS drafted several contracts, releases and waivers which all individuals must sign in order to start any service with COS, no matter how small or introductory. They must be signed again before any major service, and new contracts signed for each Scientology corporate entity the individual visits. One particular waiver—called the "Lisa Clause" by critics of Scientology—states that a member will not seek any psychiatric treatment, and gives permission for the Church of Scientology to detain any member suspected of a psychotic break or other serious mental breakdown. Such detention is to provide the Introspection Rundown, a procedure where an individual is kept isolated from everyone, with no communication. This controversial procedure was considered to be the cause of McPherson's death and, in order to prevent future lawsuits, the Church of Scientology compiled these one-sided contracts. The contracts also prohibit the individual from obtaining any copies of records related to them while granting COS the exclusive right to retain the documents. Individuals waive the right to sue COS in a court of law, and instead they must use Scientology's version of an arbitration (which L. Ron Hubbard never wrote about).

== Licensing ==
The Church of Scientology denies the legitimacy of any splinter groups and factions outside the official organization, and has tried to prevent independent Scientologists from using officially trademarked Scientology materials. Independent Scientologists, also known collectively as the "Free Zone" are referred to as squirrels within the organization. They are also classified by the Church of Scientology as suppressive persons ("SPs")—opponents or enemies of Scientology. Hubbard himself stated in Ron's Journal '67 "That there were only seven or eight Suppressive Persons on the planet".

In 2010, an exception to the rule was made specifically for the Nation of Islam, which is the only officially sanctioned external Dianetics organization and the first official non-Scientology Dianetics org since 1953. Minister Louis Farrakhan publicly announced that he had embraced Dianetics and has actively promoted it while stating that he has not become a Scientologist. He has courted a relationship with the Church of Scientology, and materials and certifications are still required to be purchased from the organization, and are not independently produced.

== See also ==
- List of Scientology organizations – Current and past corporations of Scientology conglomerate
- New religious movement – Religious community or spiritual group of modern origin
- Scientology front groups – Organizations pretending to be not-Scientology
- Scientology officials – Staff hierarchy, practices, personnel of Scientology network
