= Governing (magazine) =

US magazine

- Frequency: Monthly
- Circulation: 79,275
- Founded: 1987
- Final issue: September 2019
- Company: e.Republic
- Country: United States
- Based in: Washington, D.C.
- Website: www.governing.com
- ISSN: 0894-3842

Governing is a website, edited and published in Washington, D.C., that covers state and local government in the United States. Originally a national monthly magazine, it was published in print from 1987 to 2019. It covers policy, politics, and the management of government enterprises. Its subject areas include government finance, land use, economic development, the environment, technology, and transportation.

== History ==
Governing was originally published by Washington, D.C.-based Congressional Quarterly, Inc., a subsidiary of the Times Publishing Company of St. Petersburg, Florida. In 1994, Governing acquired its primary competitor, City & State magazine from Crain Communications, and that publication was merged into Governing. In 2009, Governing was sold to e.Republic. The sale was controversial because of e.Republic's association with members of Scientology at the time.

On August 7, 2019, the magazine announced that it would discontinue publication, with its September 2019 issue its last print edition. At first, it announced an intention to close its website and other operations; however, it later relaunched as a website with the new focus of "what state and local government looks like in a world of rapidly advancing technology". The website adopted a new subtitle, renaming itself Governing: The Future of States and Localities. It publishes daily content on public policy in the United States.

== See also ==
- Government Technology, another e.Republic publication
