= Richard McKinney (executive) =

Information Technology Executive, Public Servant (born 1950)

Richard Lewis McKinney
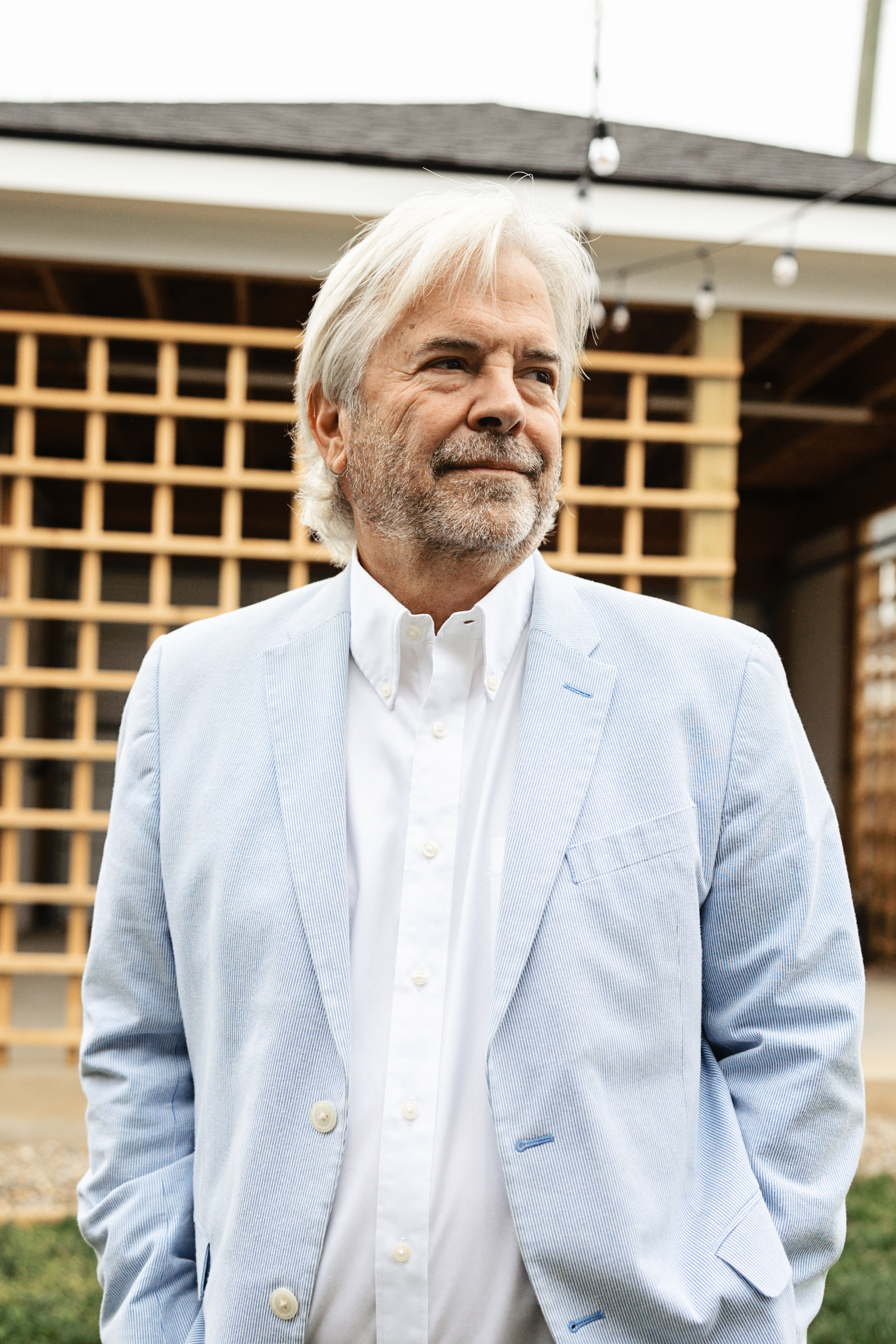
- McKinney in 2023
- Born: May 17, 1950 (age 76); Portsmouth, Ohio
- Education: Tennessee State University
- Occupations: Nashville, Tennessee, Microsoft, Chief Information Officer of the United States Department of Transportation, AECOM
- Awards: FedScoop 50 - Federal Leadership Award (2014, 2015); Computerworld Premier 100 IT Leaders (2016); Federal Computer Week Fed 100 (2016)

Richard Lewis McKinney is an American information technology executive and public servant who served as the Chief Information Officer (CIO) of the United States Department of Transportation (DOT) from 2013 to 2017 under President Barack Obama. He is known for his leadership in public-sector IT modernization at the federal, state, and municipal levels.

== Early life and education ==
McKinney was born and raised in Portsmouth, Ohio. He earned both a Bachelor of Science and a Master of Public Administration from Tennessee State University.

== Career ==
McKinney began his public career in 1985 as an administrative assistant at the Tennessee Department of the Treasury, where he helped install and manage early personal computers. He later joined the Tennessee Department of General Services, serving from 1987 to 1995 in roles ranging from Information technology consulting to Assistant Commissioner for Administration, overseeing Information systems, Budget, and State Property.

From 1995 to 1999, he was the Director of Legislative Information Systems for the Tennessee General Assembly, where he led the development of a digital bill drafting and tracking system, one of the first in the nation, and launched the legislature's first official website.

In December 1999, McKinney was appointed Chief information officer of the Metropolitan Government of Nashville and Davidson County, a position he held until October 2005.

From 2005 to 2011, McKinney worked at Microsoft as a Government Technology Advisor, helping state and local governments modernize their infrastructure and exploring early cloud computing solutions.

In May 2013, McKinney was appointed Chief Information Officer of the U.S. Department of Transportation. He served under Secretaries Ray LaHood and Anthony Foxx until January 2017. In this role, he:

Following federal service, McKinney held several concurrent roles as Vice President for Enterprise IT Strategy at AECOM (2017), Principal at Deep Water Point & Associates (2017-2019), Founder/Principal of Richard McKinney Consulting LLC (2017-2019) and Senior Fellow at the Center for Digital Government (2017-2019).

Since August 2019, McKinney has served as vice president for Government Digital Transformation at SAIC, helping federal clients modernize IT operations. In February 2022, he was formally listed as Retired - Former Federal CIO, continuing to speak and consult on digital transformation in government. He was also associate professor, Electronic Engineering Technology School of STEM - Computer Technology.

== Personal life ==
Richard McKinney lives in Summertown, Tennessee with his wife. He is the father of five.
