= E.Republic =

American research and media company

e.Republic
- Industry: Digital media Publishing
- Founded: 1984; 42 years ago
- Founders: Dennis McKenna; Robert Graves
- Headquarters: Folsom, California
- Website: www.erepublic.com

e.Republic, Inc. is an American research and media company based in Folsom, California. It publishes Government Technology, a publication covering the role of information technology in state and local government, along with several other publications. e.Republic focuses on connecting private IT companies with government and education agencies. The company has strong ties to the Church of Scientology and has previously been listed in the WISE Directory.

== History ==
e.Republic was founded as GMW Communications, Inc. by Dennis McKenna and Bob Graves in 1984. McKenna was spokesperson for the Church of Scientology in the 1970s. In 1999, e.Republic started the Center for Digital Government, a division that provides research and consulting to state and local governments.

An article in the Sacramento News & Review in 2001 reported that most of the management at e.Republic were Scientologists, and that new hires at the company were given Scientology reading materials and required to take courses on them.

In 2009, e.Republic acquired the magazine Governing from Times Publishing Company, publisher of Tampa Bay Times. In 2014, e.Republic acquired Techwire.net.

As of 2018, e.Republic employed about 200 people and its flagship publication, Government Technology, hosts dozens of conferences across 40 U.S. states.

According to D&B Hoovers, e.Republic generated $30.72 million in annual sales revenue as of 2022.
