= World Institute of Scientology Enterprises =

Scientology membership group for business people

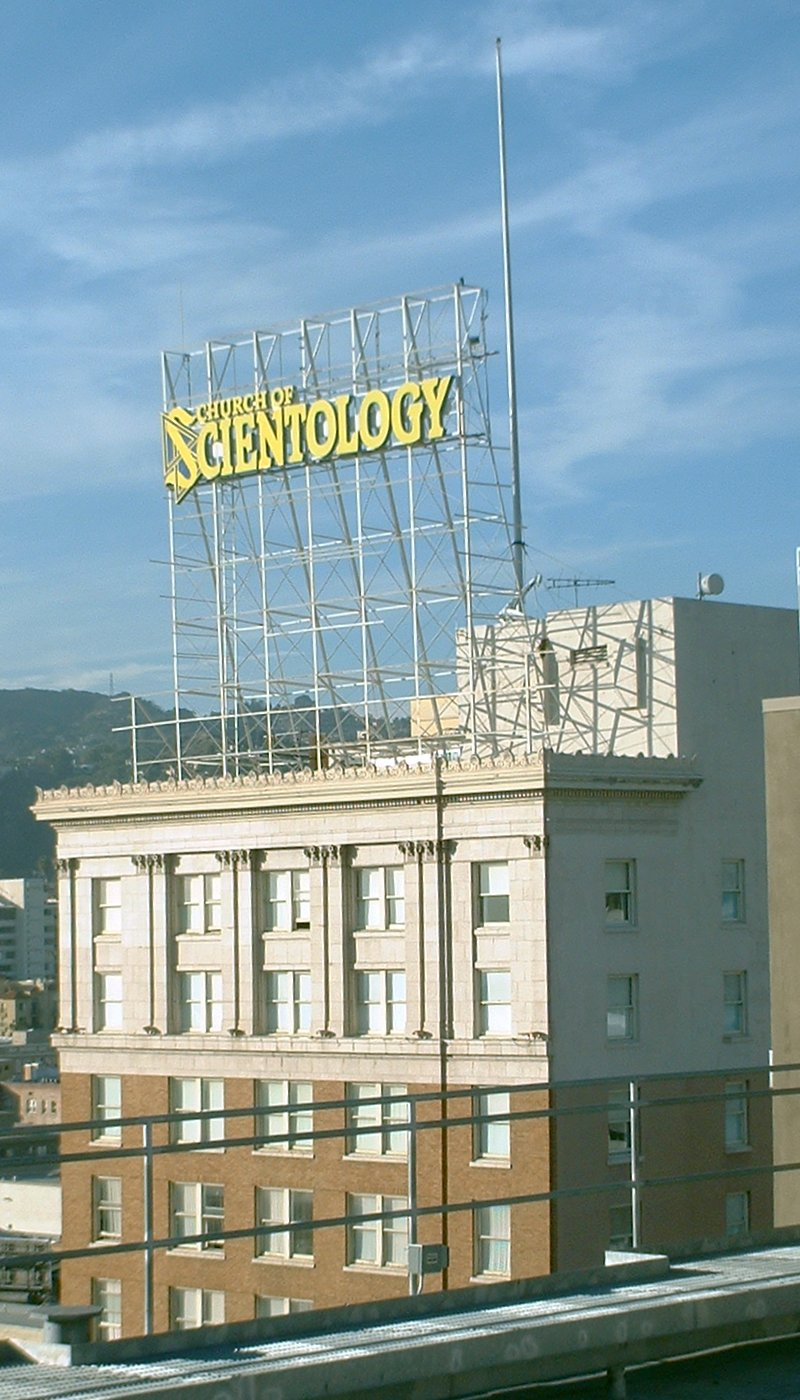
- Headquarters of the Church of Scientology International and affiliate offices
- Abbreviation: WISE
- Formation: 1979; 47 years ago
- Type: Non-profit
- Purpose: Licensing and overseeing Scientologists' businesses; Dissemination of Hubbard Administrative Technology to non-Scientologists; Making new Scientologists
- Headquarters: 6331 Hollywood Boulevard, Los Angeles, California, 90028, USA
- Publication: Prosperity
- Parent organization: Church of Scientology International
- Subsidiaries: Hubbard College of Administration
- Website: wise.org

World Institute of Scientology Enterprises (WISE) is a Church of Scientology organization headquartered in Los Angeles, California. It states that it is an "international membership organization whose members use both L. Ron Hubbard management technology and embrace the responsibilities and ethical standards of WISE membership."

== History ==
L. Ron Hubbard evolved his management techniques—which he called "Admin Tech", short for "administrative technology"—from the early 1960s through the late 1970s. The individual policies were packaged into book form under the title "Organization Executive Course" (also called "Org Exec Course" and "OEC"). Though originally intended for Scientology executives in the administration of a Scientology organization, Hubbard wrote that the information should be known by all staff members and "contained fundamentals vital to any successful or profitable activity"; it "also applied to the individual" and "any company, society or political entity".

WISE was incorporated in 1979, and was originally set up to solve the problem of Scientologists exploiting Scientology organizations to further their personal business operations, through actions such as poaching trained Church of Scientology personnel, and using Church of Scientology address books and mailing lists to sell their products and services.

The Hubbard College of Administration (HCA) was set up as the training venue to teach Hubbard Admin Tech outside of a Church of Scientology. For example, a Scientologist who wanted to run their business using Hubbard Admin Tech could send their employees to train at HCA instead of sending them into a Church of Scientology. However, Hubbard made it clear that students should learn from the original Scientology materials (rather than re-writing them for general application by businesses) and allow the student to adapt the information to their own employment situation.

In 1986, the Watchdog Committee executive over WISE published new broader goals for WISE:

Goal: LRH standard administrative technology fully in use in every business throughout the world, whether Scientologist or not, and without distraction to the business of Scientology orgs.

Purpose: For Scientology to take over the entire world business community by getting LRH admin tech fully into use in every business in the world whether Scientologist or not.

Ideal scene: Standard LRH admin tech gotten into wide use in the world business communities via WISE members and WISE activities, with LRH fully recognized as the source of the tech and their success.

In autumn 2021, WISE was designated as an "undesirable organization" in Russia.

== Organization ==
- WISE headquarters are located in Los Angeles, California, 6331 Hollywood Blvd, in the Hollywood Guaranty Building. The corporate executives of WISE belong to the Sea Org of the Church of Scientology.
- Hubbard College of Administration, training venue
- WISE regional offices, which are at Church of Scientology locations, coordinate the local level Charter Committees.
- Charter Committees of established members in local areas provide guidance and dispute mediation between WISE members instead of using the civil courts.
- Hubbard Management Consultants are WISE members licensed to sell services, seminars, training and courses based on Admin Tech and to encourage their clients to become WISE members. Consultants are encouraged to compete in the "WISE Consultant Expansion Game" with weekly standings. WISE consultants include "MasterTech Computer Products", Sterling Management Systems, Survival Strategies Inc., Management Success and David Singer Enterprises.

== Membership ==
Membership in WISE means that the owner(s) of the firm have embraced Hubbard's administrative ideas such as management by statistics and the Org board and have agreed to abide by a certain Code of Ethics which includes arbitration by a WISE mediator of any disputes with another WISE member. That is the basic company membership. If the firm also wants to train its employees in the Hubbard administrative technology using WISE materials then they become a higher-level member by paying a pre-determined amount of money to WISE. Some employees and prospective employees have objected to this formal training in that it is something that is also a part of Scientology and a number have filed discrimination lawsuits with mixed results.

WISE Members include e.Republic, which publishes Government Technology and Converge magazines and coordinates the Center for Digital Government. Other affiliated firms include various "alternative health" centers including "The Natural Health Centre" in Redondo Beach, CA which is owned and operated by Dr. Grace Syn. WISE ANZO members include Gallop Solutions based in Sydney, Australia.

== Lawsuits ==
A number of firms use the WISE administrative technology in their practices and there have been a number of civil suits and discrimination cases brought by employees objecting to the material, with mixed results.

- In 1992, two former assistants of dentist Lyn V. Bates filed suit in Canton, Ohio, claiming they "were continually, against their will, subjected to religious recruitment, proselytizing and brainwashing by defendants in fervent attempts to convert them to the Scientology cult."
- In 1994, Christina M. Goudeau of Baton Rouge, Louisiana, filed suit against Landmark Dental Care. Goudeau reported she was fired because she was expected to join the Church of Scientology, and to use Scientology practices and terminology in the office.
- In 1998, dentist Roger N. Carlsten was sued for religious discrimination in the workplace by former employee Susan Morgan, who alleged in court that she was fired for refusing to take a Scientology-filled Hubbard Administrative Technology "statistics" course. A Rhode Island Superior Court jury, however, cleared the dentist of the charges.
- In 2002, The U.S. Equal Employment Opportunity Commission filed a lawsuit on behalf of former employees of dentist Juan Villareal and Harlingen Family Dentistry in Harlingen, Texas, who refused to attend Scientology training courses.
- In 2003, three former employees of Aurora, Ohio dentist C. Aydin Cabi asserted in court that Dr. Cabi dismissed them from their jobs for their refusal to take part in Sterling Management's Scientology-based seminars.
- In 2005, dentist Daniel Stewart and his Smile Savers Dentistry in Baltimore, Maryland, were sued by former employee Tammy Bright. She accused her employer of religious discrimination for failure to adapt her religious beliefs to Scientology. Devora Lindeman, Stewart's attorney who is also a Scientologist herself, denied the allegations and said Bright was fired for "poor performance."
- In 2006, the Equal Employment Opportunity Commission filed a federal lawsuit against dentist K. Mike Dossett of Plano, Texas, on behalf of Dossett's former receptionist, Jessica Uretsky. The suit alleges that Uretsky was pressured to study Scientology during mandatory meetings on her own time, and was told to "increase business by concentrating on her phone to make it ring".
- In 2008, two former employees of Diskeeper, a WISE member company, sued the company after being dismissed for refusing to participate in Scientology training courses.
- In 2009, a former dental assistant reported a dentist to the Oregon Bureau of Labor and Industries for religious discrimination after she felt pressured to attend a Scientology conference. In 2012, the dentist paid nearly $348,000 to settle the allegation.

== Hubbard College of Administration ==
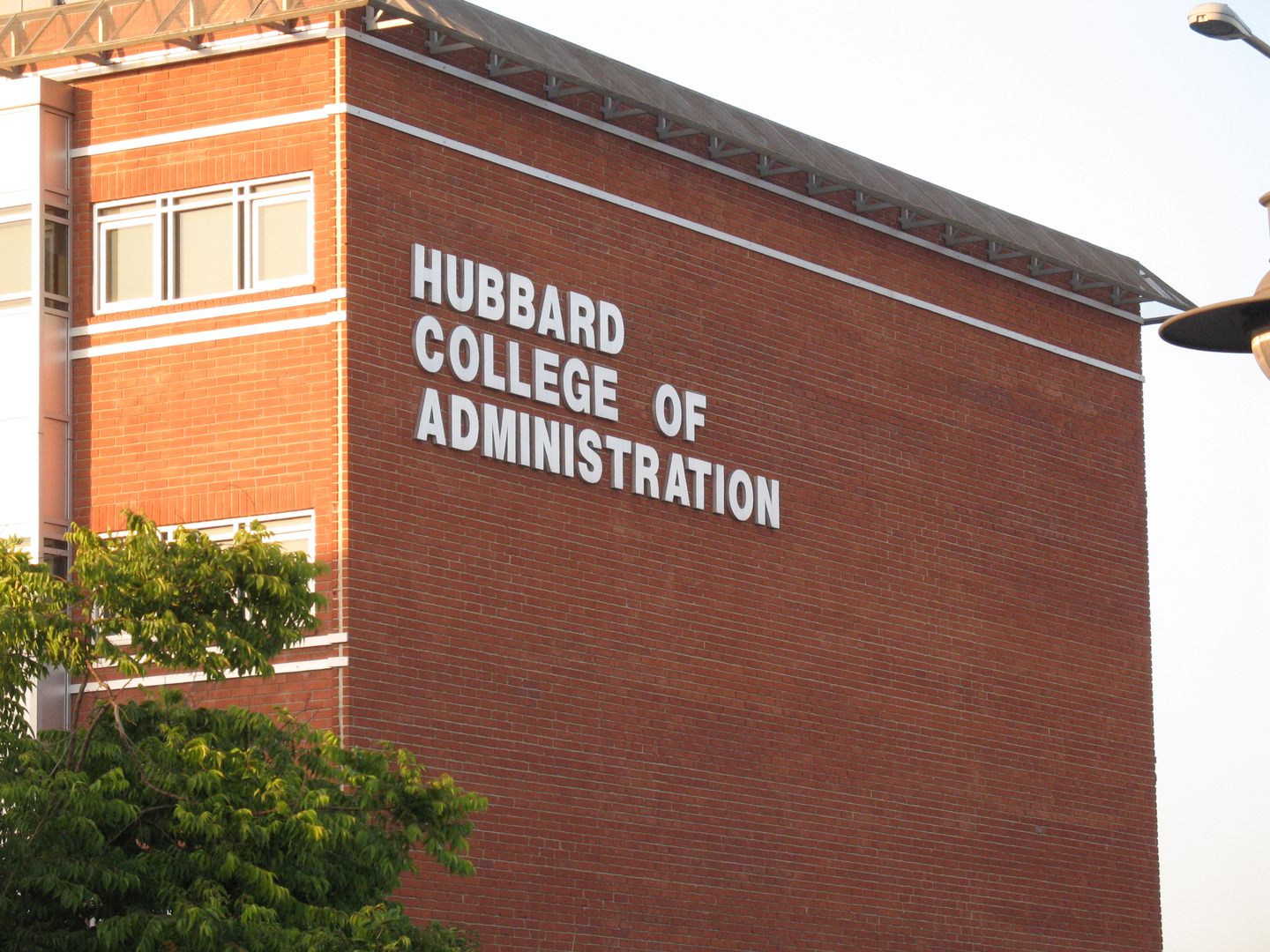
Hubbard College of Administration

The Hubbard College of Administration (HCA) was established in 1990 by WISE, and started operations in 1991. It received its tax-exempt status in 1993 as part of a negotiated settlement in which the IRS granted tax exempt status to 153 "Scientology-related entities" in the United States. HCA was formerly called "WISE College", and remains a subsidiary of WISE. HCA's building, located at 320 North Vermont Avenue, Los Angeles, California, was purchased in 2000 for $1.57M and renovated in 2001; it was damaged in a fire in September 2025.

The school administers the WISE certificate programs as well as offering continuing education courses, workshops, corporate seminars, and an associate degree program in management and administration. It teaches L. Ron Hubbard's method of business administration and uses his Study Technology learning methods, both of which he developed for the Church of Scientology. Students do not attend traditional academic terms but instead can begin taking courses at any time of the year, and may attend either full-time or part-time. HCA reported 18 students enrolled in 2022.

HCA is accredited by the Accrediting Council for Continuing Education and Training. Students are not eligible for federal or state financial aid programs, and the school does not participate in any student financial aid programs such as Federal Student Aid, veterans' financial aid education programs, or the Cal Grant program.
