= Government Technology =

American technology magazine

- Editor-in-Chief: Dustin Haisler
- Categories: technology, government, thought leadership
- Frequency: Monthly
- First issue: January 1987
- Company: e.Republic Incorporated
- Country: United States
- Language: English
- Website: www.govtech.com

Government Technology magazine is the flagship periodical of Folsom, California-based publishing company e.Republic Incorporated. The magazine contains editorial content about information technology in the public-sector, primarily in state and local government.

Government Technology serves branches of the state, county, municipal, special district and federal government as well as government associations.

Government Technology is a trade publication. Circulation, according to e.Republic, was 77,897 at the end of the 2008 fiscal year. It also hosts related conferences with seminars for the private and public sectors.

== See also ==
- Governing, another publication from the same company
