= Sterling Management =

American management consulting firm

The Emery Wilson Corporation doing business as Sterling
- Sterling, Glendale, California
- Trade name: Sterling Management
- Type: For-profit
- Founded: Vacaville, California (March 1983)
- Founder: Dr. Gregory K. Hughes, DDS
- Headquarters: Glendale, CA, United States
- Key people: Kevin C. Wilson, Chairman, CEO
- Services: Business consulting
- Owner: Kevin C. Wilson
- Website: sterling.us
- Footnotes; Awards: INC 500 award winner 1988, 1989

Sterling Management is a management consulting firm led by CEO and Chairman Kevin Wilson. A private corporation owned and operated by the Emery Wilson Corporation, it offers business administration seminars and training based on L. Ron Hubbard's teachings to dentists, accountants, veterinarians, optometrists and other medical and private practice professionals. Founded in 1983 in the back office of a dental practice in Vacaville, California, it is currently located in a 20,000-square-foot (1,900 m^{2}) office in Los Angeles, California.

== Services ==
Sterling provides services under a license from WISE, the World Institute of Scientology Enterprises^{p. 10}, which oversees the use of L. Ron Hubbard's copyrighted materials in applications in the business community at large.

For practice owners and key executives Sterling's services involve formal training delivered at their facilities in Los Angeles, California. Staff training is typically delivered at weekend workshops held by the company throughout the year in major cities around the US.

== History ==
According to a deposition by Emery Wilson's Director of Public Affairs, from 1994 to 2015 the company was affected by the economic climate, reducing its staff complement to 25 from nearly 300.^{p. 7}

== Relationship to the Church of Scientology ==
The company is licensed to train the administration methods of L. Ron Hubbard, but claim that they are not a religious organization. The company's Director of Public Affairs has, however, stated that most of the company's employees are involved in Scientology.^{p. 25}

== Criticism ==
Sterling has been criticized for its "high-pressure sales tactics". According to the LA Times, Sterling offers and teaches the same techniques the Church of Scientology has for years employed including heavy marketing, high productivity and rigid rules of employee conduct.

Wilson's New Religious Movements and Heela's The New Age Movement describe Sterling as an "est-like movement", referring to Werner Erhard's Erhard Seminars Training.

Glover Rowe and his wife Dee stated in 1990 that they were forcibly held against their will by Scientologists after attending two Sterling seminars: they claimed that their tests indicated that without auditing, their business would fail and Dee would abuse their child.

"They put a telephone in front of me and said I should call every member of my family and tell them I was a member of the Church of Scientology. I refused," said Mrs. Rowe. "At that point, they said, 'but you see Dee, you have to.'....... "For seven hours, a man drilled me, tried to brainwash me," said Mrs. Rowe. " l begged him to let me go, he kept saying, 'but you see Dee, you can't.' He tried to get me to confess to crimes. He started getting me to tell him sex stories. He made me list every overt sin I had committed. They insisted I write down everything I had done wrong. I couldn't list anything bad enough to please them."

— 'Management Seminar' Harrowing Experience", Cherokee County Herald, December 12, 1990

== See also ==
- Management consulting
- World Institute of Scientology Enterprises
- L. Ron Hubbard
