= Church of Scientology trademarks =

American organization trade identifiers

Church of Scientology trademarks include numerous registered trademarks and service marks. The Church of Scientology and its many managed corporations use these trademarks to generate license income from its subsidiaries, and to stifle competition, dissent, and critique through litigation.

== Background and scope ==
L. Ron Hubbard, who died in 1986, initially owned all the trademarks and service marks related to Dianetics and Scientology, but in 1982 Religious Technology Center (RTC) was created and these marks were transferred to RTC. Today, RTC holds hundreds of registered trademarks, and licenses them to the various corporate entities within the Scientology network each of whom sign agreements giving them the rights to use the trademark. Even Hubbard's signatures and initials have been trademarked, as well as the names of all the Scientology "processes", a practice quite unlike traditional religions. Scientologist is a collective membership mark designating members of the Church.

== Use of litigation ==
The Church of Scientology uses litigation over trademark infringement to suppress competition and derivative groups that used to be connected with the Church of Scientology. An example is Church of Scientology Intern. v. Elmira Mission, 614 F.Supp. 500 (W.D. N.Y. 1985). This case is about a Scientology mission that broke away in 1984 and started an offshoot group called Center for Creative Learning, while continuing to use the tradename and trademarks without the authorization of the Church.

There have been at least three cases where the Church claimed trademark infringement by former Scientologists engaged in critiquing Scientology, rather than practicing it—Religious Technology Center v Lerma (897 F. Supp. at 261), Religious Technology Center v. F.A.C.T.Net, Inc. (901 F. Supp. at 1521), and Religious Technology Center v. Netcom On-Line Communication Services, Inc. (923 F. Supp. at 1238).

One of the earliest uses of this sort of litigation was against David Mayo. Mayo had been personally trained by L. Ron Hubbard and was to be appointed "guardian of Scientology's doctrine" after Hubbard's death, but the coup by David Miscavige to wrench power and control of the Church in the early 1980s led to Mayo's removal. Mayo set up his own practice and was harassed by campaigns of fair game and litigation until he went bankrupt and closed his practice.

In early litigation the Church framed its courtroom arguments under the concept of trade secrets—the secret part behind public-facing trademarks. Those tactics failed in the FACTNet case when they argued that their trade secrets might cause "irreparable spiritual injury if a rival church... were allowed to disseminate them". Having learned its lesson, a few years later they won a case when they instead "argued that the violation of its trade secrets would lead to serious economic harm because it generates so much income from the confidential OT levels".

== Consequences ==
Even as Scientology continues to pursue religious recognition worldwide, in 2015 a Moscow branch of Scientology was raided, banned, and several Scientology officials were arrested; the prosecution argued that "as the Church of Scientology registered its name as a US Trademark it can't call itself a religious organization"—the Supreme Court of Russia agreed.

== List of trademarks by organization ==
=== Religious Technology Center ===
Religious Technology Center (RTC) is the owner and manager of Scientology intellectual property. It is headed by David Miscavige. RTC holds over a hundred trademarks.

General trademarked words include: Clearsound, Dianetics, E-meter, Hubbard, L. Ron Hubbard, LRH, Mark Ultra VIII, OCA, Oxford Capacity Analysis, Scientologist, Scientology, Scientometric, Standard Tech, The Bridge—and their related symbols, logos and designs: Clearsound, Dianetics, Dianetics symbol in a circle, Division 6, Golden Age of Knowledge, L. Ron Hubbard signature, LRH device, LRH microphone, Mark Ultra VIII, Ron signature, Scientology, Scientology pointed cross, Scientology rounded cross, Standard Tech.

Trademarked organization-related words and phrases include: Flag, Freewinds, Golden Era Productions, INCOMM, Religious Technology Center, Saint Hill—and their related symbols, logos and designs: Church of Scientology International, Flag, Freewinds, FSO, FSSO, Golden Era Productions, Ideal Organizations, I HELP, INCOMM, Manor Hotel, New FSO Corporate, RTC corporate, Scientology Missions International, Scientology Volunteer Minister, Sea Org.

The following names of training courses and auditing rundowns have been trademarked: ARC Straightwire, Book One, Cause Resurgence Rundown, Clearing Course, Expanded Grade 0 – Communications Release, Expanded Grade I – Problems Release, Expanded Grade II – Relief Release, Expanded Grade III – Freedom Release, Expanded Grade IV – Ability Release, False Purpose Rundown, Grade I: Problems Release, Grade II: Relief Release, Grade III: Freedom Release, Grade IV: Ability Release, Happiness Rundown, Hubbard Life Orientation, Key to Life, L10 Rundown, L11 New Life Rundown, L12 Flag OT Executive Rundown, Method 1, NED, New Era, New Era Dianetics, New Life Rundown, NOTs, OT, Power, Power Plus, Purification, Purification Program, Purification Rundown, Scientology Life Improvement, Solo Auditor, Student Hat, Sunshine Rundown, Super Power—and their related training and auditing symbols, logos and designs: Cause Resurgence Rundown, Class IV Auditor, Class V Auditor, Class V Graduate Auditor, Class VIII Auditor, Hat in Life, Key to Life, Ls, OT, Power pin, Release pin, SHSBC, Solo Auditor, Solo NOTs, Super Power.

The following magazine and periodical names have been trademarked: Ability, Advance!, Cause, Celebrity, Freedom, Scientology Today, Source, and The Auditor.

=== L. Ron Hubbard Library ===
Church of Spiritual Technology, doing business as L. Ron Hubbard Library, owns the copyrights to L. Ron Hubbard's texts, and the trademarks Writers of the Future, Illustrators of the Future, their logos and medallion design, Mission Earth and its fist and glove logo. L. Ron Hubbard Library trademarks and service marks include The Way to Happiness and its "road and sun" design.

=== Author Services and Galaxy Press ===
Author Services Inc. and Galaxy Press are the administrators of L. Ron Hubbard's fiction works. They own the trademarks Battlefield Earth, Author Services, Inc. and the cornucopia logo. Bridge Publications and New Era Publications are the publishers of L. Ron Hubbard's nonfiction works.

=== Association for Better Living and Education International ===
ABLE Int is the managing organization over the educational and drug rehabilitation sectors, including managing Association for Better Living and Education (ABLE), Applied Scholastics (APS), Criminon, Narconon, and The Way to Happiness (TWTH). Trademarks and service marks owned by ABLE Int include: ABLE and the ABLE logo, Criminon and the Criminon logo, Narconon and the Narconon "Jumping Man" design, Applied Scholastics and the Applied Scholastics open book logo, Effective Education Publishing and the Effective Education Publishing design.

=== Citizens Commission on Human Rights ===
Citizens Commission on Human Rights is an anti-psychiatry organization. It owns the trademarks to CCHR, Citizens Commission on Human Rights, and the CCHR logo.

=== World Institute of Scientology Enterprises ===
World Institute of Scientology Enterprises (WISE) is the branch that takes Hubbard's administrative and management techniques that he codified for running the Church of Scientology and packages it in a secular manner for businesses. It also licenses consultants to teach businesses how to use the techniques. WISE International owns the trademarks: WISE, Prosperity (the name of their magazine), the lioness and cubs symbol, Model of Admin Know-How and MAKH.

Hubbard College of Administration operates under WISE as a business college teaching Hubbard's administrative and management techniques. HCA owns the running tiger symbol.

== Foreign trademarks ==
The Church has registered trademarks in other languages and other countries. Here are some of the variations and translated-trademarks of the primary three.

L. Ron Hubbard

- L.·羅恩·賀伯特 (Chinese)
- Л. Рон Хаббард (Cyrillic)
- ל. רון הבארד (Hebrew)
- L・ロン・ハバード (Katakana)

Scientology

- Cienciologia
- Cientologia
- Scientologi
- Scientologia
- Scientologie
- Szcientologia
- 山達基 (Chinese)
- Саентология (Cyrillic)
- סיינטולוגיה (Hebrew)
- サイエントロジー (Katakana)

Dianetics

- Dajnetika
- Dianetica
- Dianética
- Dianetiikka
- Dianetik (Swedish)
- Dianetika
- Dianétique
- Dianetyka
- 戴尼提 (Chinese)
- Дианетика (Cyrillic)
- Διανοητική (Greek)
- דיאנטיקה (Hebrew)
- दिअनेटिक्स (Hindi)
- ダヤネチックス (Katakana)

== See also ==
- Scientology symbols
- Scientology and law — includes civil suits alleging copyright and trademark infringement
- Bibliography of Scientology — copyrighted writings by the Church of Scientology
- Church of Jesus Christ of Latter-day Saints Trademark lawsuit
