= Trementina Base =

Scientology-affiliated property in New Mexico

Coordinates: 35°31′28.56″N 104°34′20.20″W

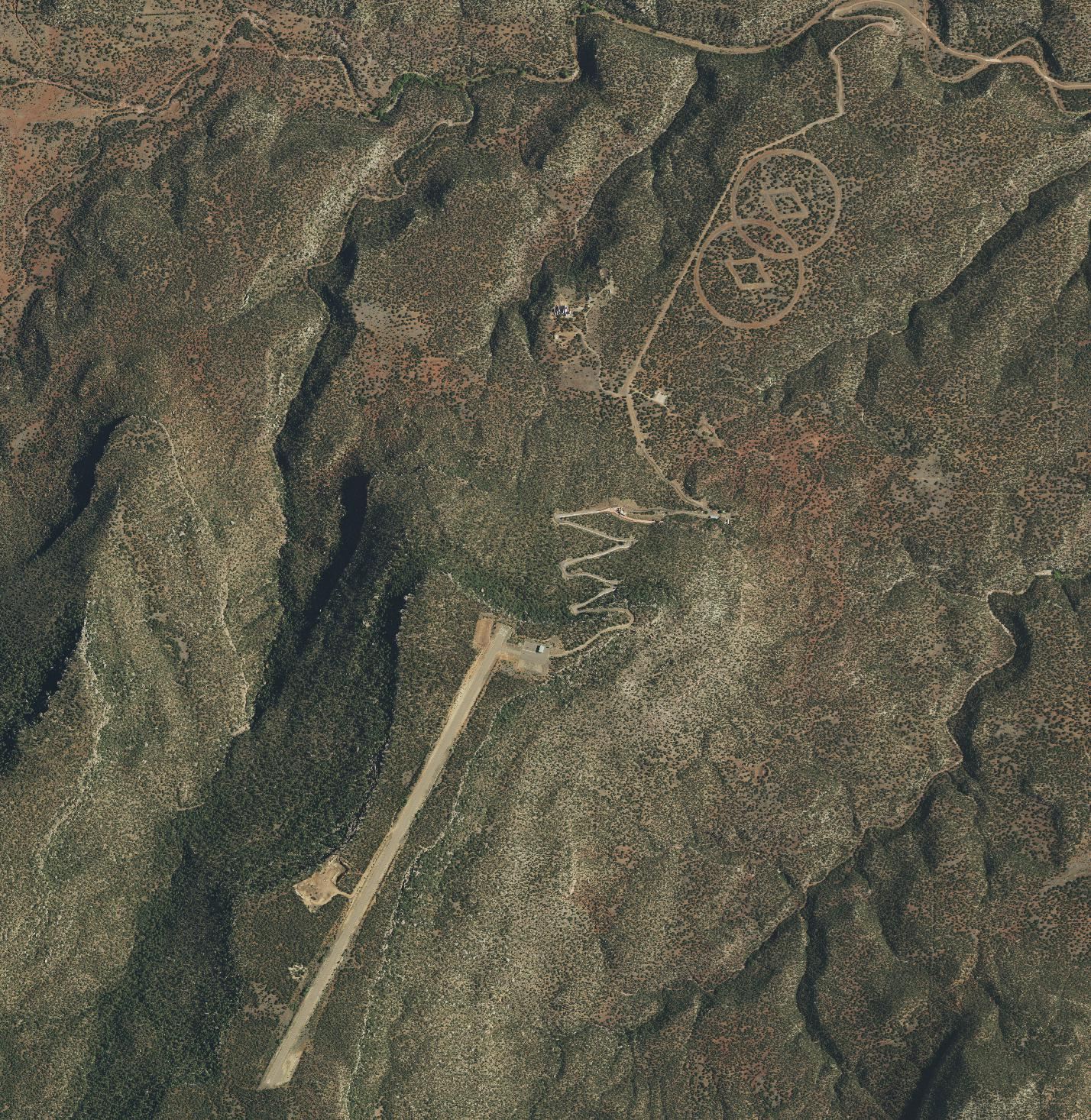
Trementina Base (center)

Trementina Base is the popular designation for a property of the Scientology-affiliated Church of Spiritual Technology (CST) near Trementina, New Mexico, US.

== Overview ==
According to the CST, an entity formed to manage the Church of Scientology's copyright affairs, the purpose of the base is to provide storage space for an archiving project to preserve Scientology founder L. Ron Hubbard's writings, films and recordings for future generations. Hubbard's texts have been engraved on stainless steel tablets and encased in titanium capsules underground. The project began in the late 1980s.

The Church of Scientology protects Hubbard's writings with “extraordinary zeal.” Copies of Hubbard's text are preserved and hidden behind fences, in deep vaults, guarded by tight security. The underground compound “stands as a symbol of the timelessness of Hubbard’s texts and as a three-dimensional manifestation of the ‘purity of Hubbard’s legacy.”

The base includes a number of dwellings and the archives themselves, the latter in a network of tunnels. The base also has its own private, paved airstrip, the San Miguel Ranch Airport (NM53).

== History ==
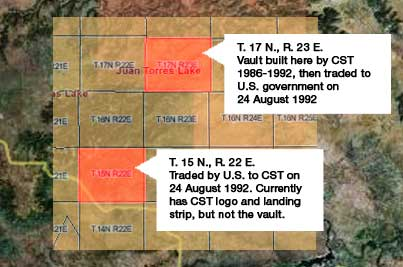
The two parcels of land in New Mexico

The property history of Trementina Base is complex. The Federal Register shows that CST has owned two properties in the same area at different times. The one they originally built the underground vault on, between 1986 and 1992.

- Department of the Interior, Bureau of Land Management Number: G-910-G3-0006-4210-04; NMNM 83264
- The United States issued an exchange conveyance document to the Church of Spiritual Technology, a California corporation, on August 24, 1992, for the surface estate in the following described land in San Miguel County, New Mexico, pursuant to section 206 of the Act of October 21, 1976 (43 U.S.C. 1716).
- New Mexico Principal Meridian T. 15 N., R. 22 E. ...Containing 400.00 acres (1.6187 km^{2}).
- In exchange for the land described above, the Church of Spiritual Technology conveyed to the United States the surface estate in the following described land located in San Miguel County, New Mexico:
- New Mexico Principal Meridian T. 17 N., R. 23 E. ...Containing 400.00 acres (1.6187 km^{2}).
- The values of the Federal public land and the non-Federal land in the exchange were appraised at $28,000.00. The public interest was served through the completion of this exchange.

CST purchased the original site in 1986 for $250,976, then invested millions in building an underground vault on the property. The Federal Register record says both properties were valued at only $28,000 at the time of the land swap in August 1992. However, footage from KRQE TV shows the presence of a vault built into the mountainside between the runway and the CST logo.

== Aerial symbols ==
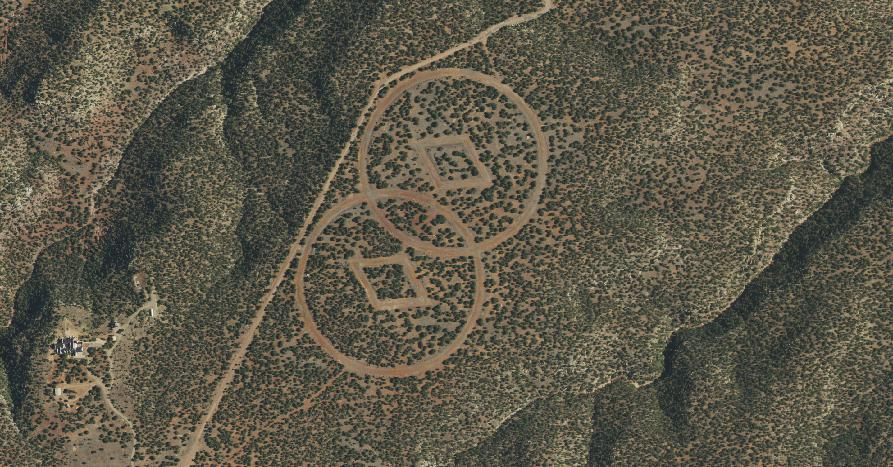
Trementina markings, including the Church of Spiritual Technology symbol.

An aerial photograph showing the base's enormous Scientology symbols on the ground caused media interest and broke the story in November 2005. According to a Washington Post report, the Church's first reaction was to attempt to suppress the information:

The church tried to persuade station KRQE not to air its report last week about the aerial signposts marking a Scientology compound that includes a huge vault "built into a mountainside," the station said on its Website. ... Based in Los Angeles, the corporation dispatched an official named Jane McNairn and an attorney to visit the TV station in an effort to squelch the story, KRQE news director Michelle Donaldson said.

The church offered a tour of the underground facility if KRQE would kill the piece, the station said in its newscast. Scientology also called KRQE’s owner, Emmis Communications, and “sought the help of a powerful New Mexican lawmaker” to lobby against airing the piece, the station reported on its Web site.

The huge symbols on the base, distinguishable only from an aerial view ( 35°31'28.56"N 104°34'20.20"W), are specifically those of Scientology's Church of Spiritual Technology. Former members of the Church have said that the symbol marks a "return point" for Scientologists to help find Hubbard's works when they travel here in the future from other places in the universe.

== Other locations ==
Reportedly, two similar bases maintained by the Church of Spiritual Technology are located in Petrolia, California (40°23'15.55"N 124°18'19.05"W), and Creston, California (35°27'12.29"N 120°29'59.20"W), both for archiving permanent backups of Hubbard's every written and spoken word. Internal Revenue Service records show that Scientologists spent $13 million in 1992 to preserve Hubbard's fiction and non-fiction writings on 1.8 million stainless steel discs, and recorded his lectures on 187,000 nickel records. The Church of Spiritual Technology symbol also appears at the Petrolia location and in the middle of a track at the ranch in Creston, California where L. Ron Hubbard died.

== See also ==
- Scientology properties
- Scientology symbols
