= Scientology symbols =

Scientology symbols include graphic emblems, diagrams, and visual devices used by the Church of Scientology and affiliated organizations. Many were created or approved by L. Ron Hubbard and are used to represent key concepts such as the ARC and KRC triangles, the eight dynamics, the Scientology cross, and the S-and-double-triangle emblem. These symbols appear throughout Scientology literature, training materials, uniforms, and buildings, and visually express elements of Scientology beliefs and practices.

Scholars of new religious movements have noted that Scientology employs distinctive symbols that reinforce insider identity, and encode Hubbard's conceptual system. Some researchers have connected Scientology's symbolic system to Hubbard's emphasis on mystery, games conditions, and the mechanisms by which a thetan becomes stuck or entrapped. Mikael Rothstein states that Scientology's symbols imprint on the participant, help structure the believer's understanding of spiritual progression and organizational hierarchy, and suggests that "Hubbard is symbolically embedded in the [e-meter] and is symbolically manifested during its use".

All official symbols of Scientology are trademarks held by the Religious Technology Center (RTC). RTC says they are to be used "on Scientology religious materials to signify their authenticity ... and provide a legal mechanism to ensure the spiritual technologies are orthodox and ministered according to Mr. Hubbard's Scripture. These marks also provide the means to prevent anyone from engaging in some distorted use of Mr. Hubbard's writings, thereby ensuring the purity of the religion for all eternity."

== Scientology cross ==
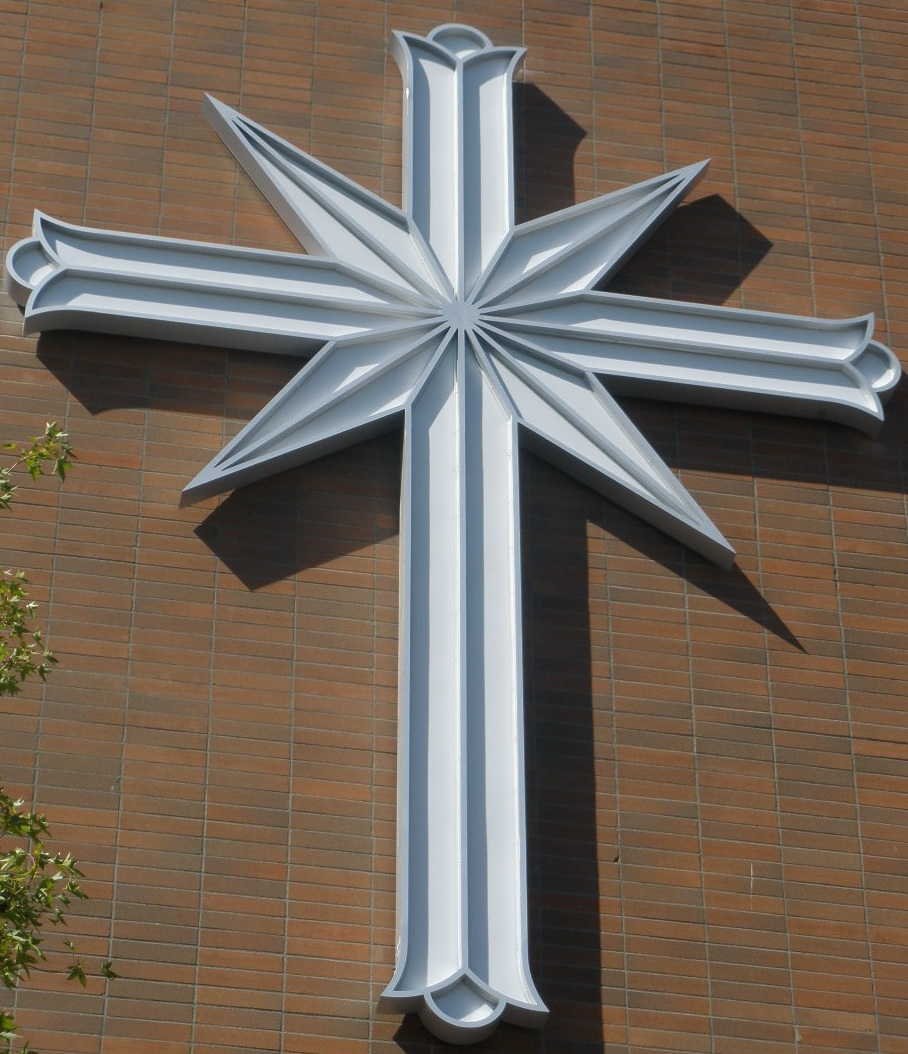

The Scientology cross is an eight-pointed cross resembling a Latin cross with four additional diagonal rays. The eight points represent the eight dynamics of existence in Scientology. Hubbard introduced the cross in 1955, and it is used on church buildings, ministerial garments, and religious materials. Although visually similar to certain esoteric or Rosicrucian crosses, the Church states that it is not associated with the Christian cross.

== Scientology symbol (S and double triangle) ==

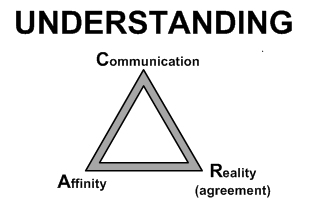

The Scientology symbol consists of a large letter S intersecting two equilateral triangles. The S stands for Scientology. The upper triangle represents the KRC triangle (Knowledge, Responsibility, and Control), while the lower triangle represents the ARC triangle (Affinity, Reality, and Communication). These conceptual triangles appear throughout Scientology literature and training materials. The S-and-double-triangle symbol is widely used within church buildings and on the cover of books.

The ARC triangle is a conceptual diagram consisting of three points labeled Affinity, Reality, and Communication. In Scientology doctrine, these three components are said to form the basis of understanding and interpersonal relationships. The triangle appears in training materials explaining Scientology's approach to communication and emotional states. The KRC triangle represents Knowledge, Responsibility, and Control. Hubbard introduced it as a higher-level counterpart to the ARC triangle, describing it as a framework for effective action and leadership.

== Dianetics symbol ==
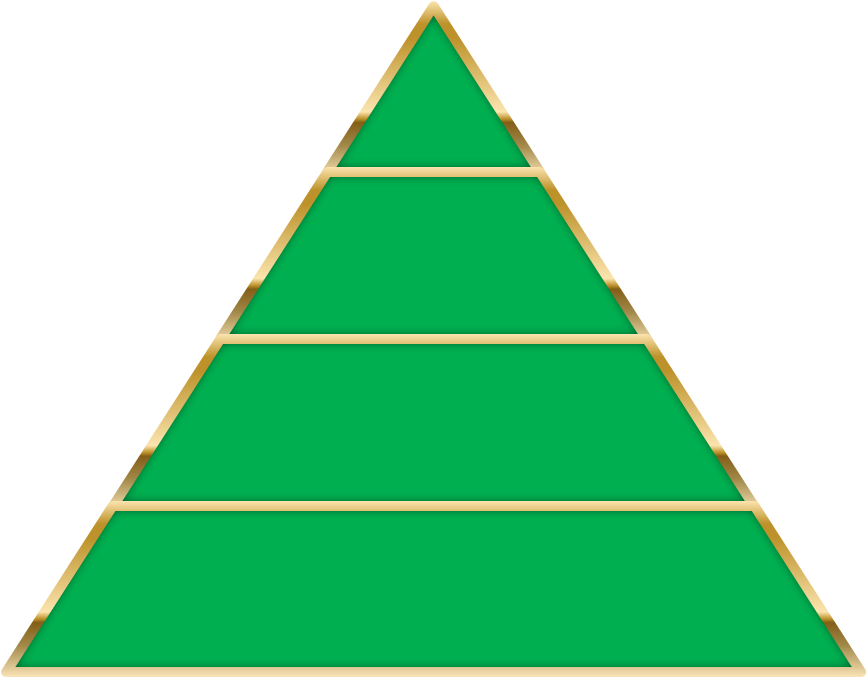

Dianetics predates Scientology, and its symbol consists of a green and yellow triangle with alternating stripes. According to Church materials, the green stripes represent growth and the yellow stripes represent life. The four green stripes are said to correspond to the first four "dynamics" or urges toward survival, described in Hubbard's 1950 book Dianetics: The Modern Science of Mental Health. The symbol appears on Dianetics books, introductory materials, and promotional items.

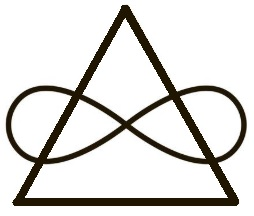

The Division 6 symbol is a simple triangle with an infinity symbol woven across, it is used to mark introductory materials. Division 6 is the section of a Scientology organization which promotes to new people and provides services for newcomers.

== Volcano imagery ==
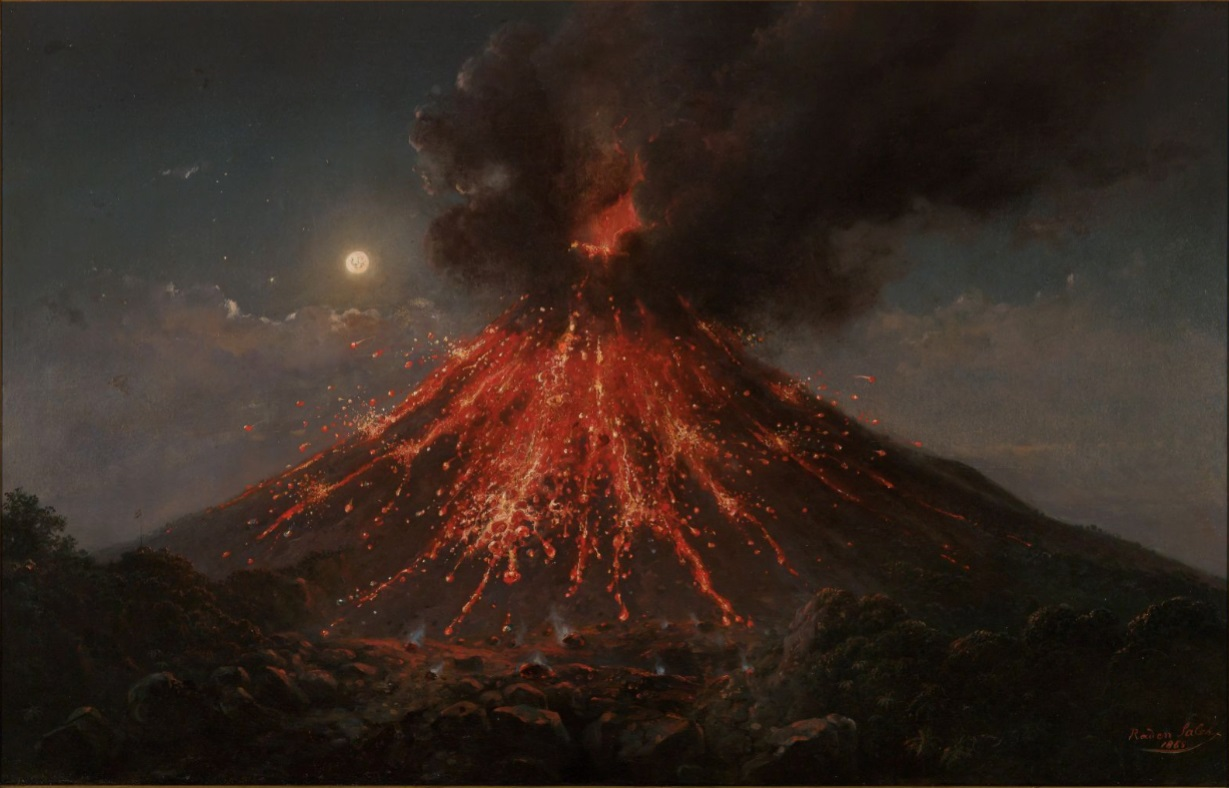
An erupting volcano similar to Scientology's iconography

An erupting volcano functions as a recurring visual motif tied to Scientology's mythology and is widely recognized as part of Scientology's iconography. The Church of Scientology uses imagery of an erupting volcano in its promotional materials, most prominently on the covers of the book Dianetics: The Modern Science of Mental Health and in advertising campaigns. Bent Corydon wrote that it was believed the volcano motif would stimulate demand and make Dianetics books irresistible. Hubbard instructed his marketing staff that the volcano image would have a hypnotizing effect on viewers because the volcano would evoke memories from the Xenu story in which the galactic ruler Xenu placed billions of beings around Earth's volcanoes and killed them with nuclear bombs. Church representative Warren McShane confirmed that the volcano imagery is associated with this catastrophic event.

== Theta symbol ==

Scientology uses the Greek letter theta (θ) as a symbol for life force, spirit, or the source of life. Hubbard adopted the symbol early in the development of Scientology to represent the non-material essence of a person, which he called the thetan. The term "thetan" is derived from "theta + n". The symbol appears in training materials and discussions of the "seventh dynamic", which concerns spiritual existence.

== Infinity symbol ==
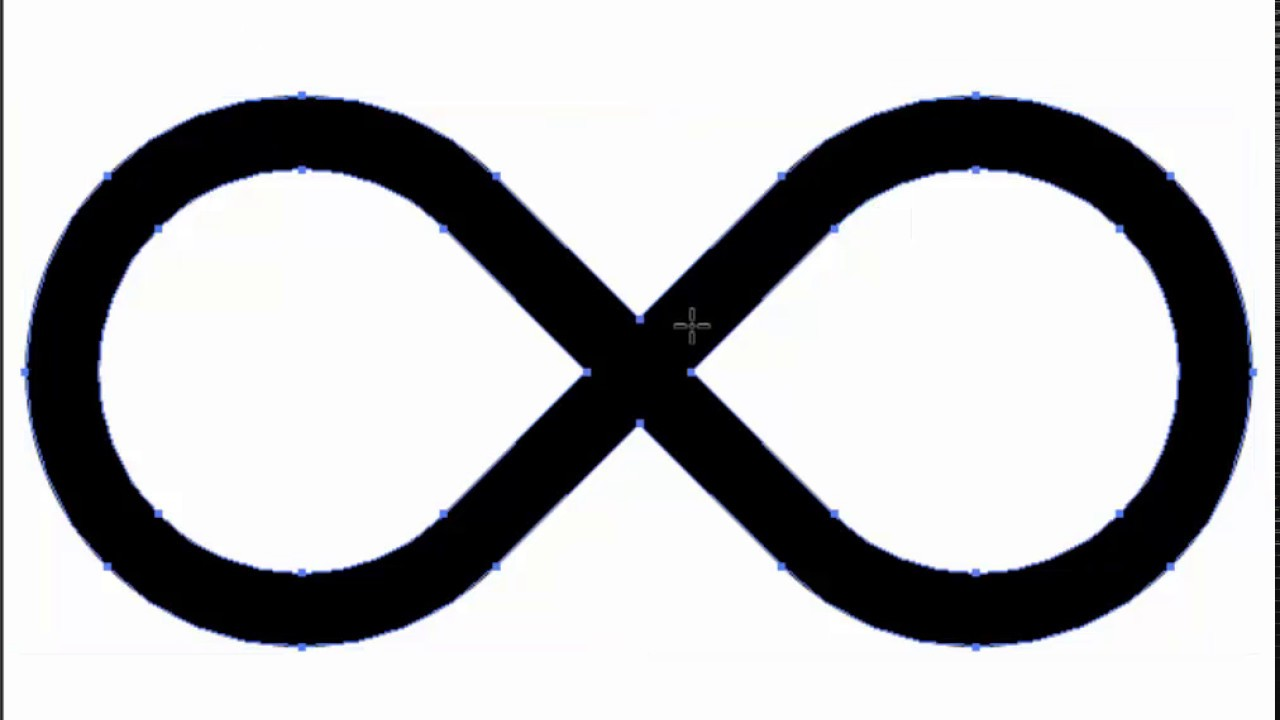

The infinity symbol (∞) is used in Scientology to represent the "eighth dynamic", described as the urge toward existence as infinity or the Supreme Being. Hubbard also used the symbol in the title of his book "Scientology 8-8008", where the upright infinity symbol is said to resemble the numeral eight (8). In this context, the symbol represents the reduction of the apparent infinity of the physical universe (∞ to 0) and the expansion of one's own spiritual universe (0 to ∞), hence 8008 symbolism. The infinity symbol appears in diagrams and discussions of the dynamics and spiritual progression.

== Operating Thetan symbol ==
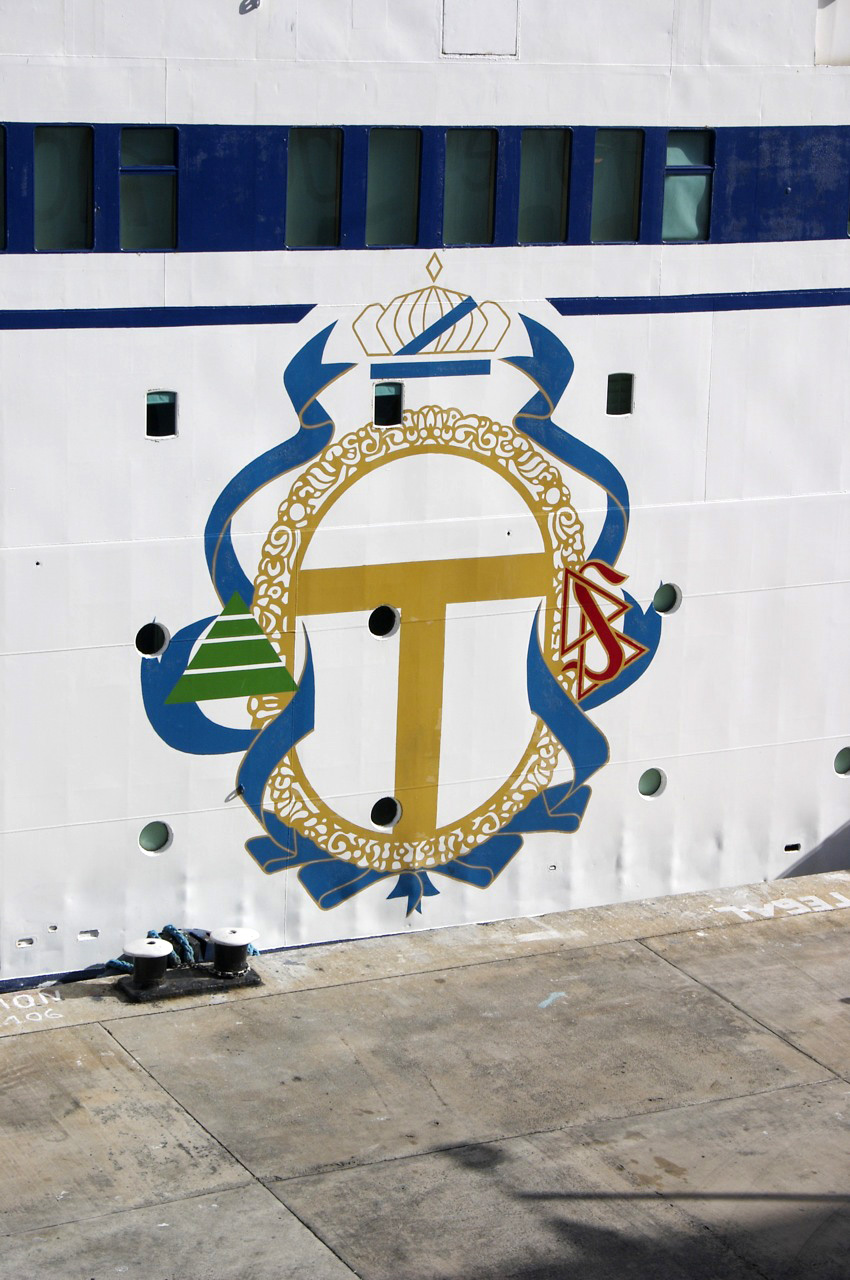

The Operating Thetan (OT) symbol consists of an oval letter O enclosing a letter T. Scientologists who have completed the advanced level OT V may use the embellished version featuring a wreath around the O. The OT symbol appears on advanced course materials, insignia, and the exterior of Church buildings that deliver OT level services. The Operating Thetan symbol with wreath is prominently displayed on the side of the Scientology cruise ship Freewinds, along with the Dianetics and Scientology symbols.

== Sea Org symbol ==

The symbol of the Sea Organization is colored gold and consists of two crossed laurel branches with a five-pointed star above. The Sea Org is the senior-most group of staff within the Church of Scientology network. At one point Hubbard said the star symbolized the spirit and the laurel wreath represented victory, though in a 1968 lecture he said the star was the galactic confederation and the 26 leaves were the number of stars in the confederation. The symbol appears on uniforms, uniform insignia, flags, and Sea Org materials.

== L. Ron Hubbard hallmark ==

The L. Ron Hubbard hallmark is a stylized monogram combining the letters L, R, and H. Designed to resemble an assay office hallmark, it is used to authenticate Hubbard's writings, lectures, and approved Scientology materials. The symbol appears on books, devices, jewelry, and other official items.

== Church of Spiritual Technology symbol ==
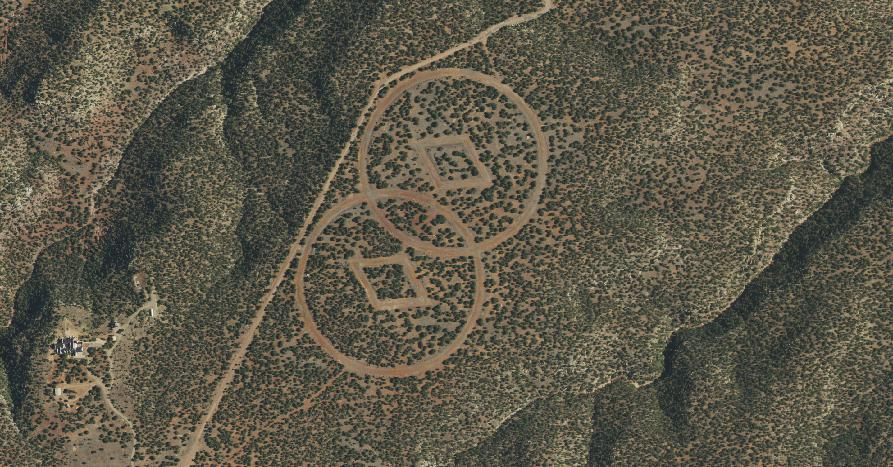

The Church of Spiritual Technology (CST) uses a symbol consisting of two overlapping circles, each containing a lozenge shape. Large versions of this symbol are carved into the landscape at CST archival sites, including the Trementina Base in New Mexico, where they are visible from the air. CST maintains archival copies of Hubbard's writings and lectures in vaults marked with this symbol.

== See also ==
- Church of Scientology trademarks
- Scientology beliefs and practices
- Category:Scientology organization logos
