= Orientation: A Scientology Information Film =

Church of Scientology introductory film

- Logo from the film's website
- Directed by: Mitch Brisker
- Screenplay by: L. Ron Hubbard
- Starring: Larry Anderson
- Music by: Geoff Levin
- Production company: Golden Era Productions
- Release date: 1996; (Note: Film was released at the March 1996 L. Ron Hubbard Birthday Event.)
- Running time: 40 minutes
- Country: United States
- Language: English

Orientation: A Scientology Information Film is a 1996 short film providing an introduction and overview to Scientology. It was shown by the Church of Scientology to people before they attend their first service in Scientology, and after signing a release form. It was produced by Golden Era Productions and, like all Scientology instructional films, is based on a screenplay originally written by Scientology founder L. Ron Hubbard.

The 40-minute film is hosted by Larry Anderson, who left the church in 2009. According to the St. Petersburg Times, "The film exudes a message of pride, promise and opportunity. It's a mix of testimonials and an Anderson-narrated introduction to Scientology founder L. Ron Hubbard — his philosophies, writings and lectures — and to auditing, which a church official in the film says can raise a person's IQ". The film includes testimonials by several celebrity Scientologists including Kirstie Alley, Anne Archer, Chick Corea, Isaac Hayes, and John Travolta, uncredited and identified only by their occupations.

In the film's final scene, Anderson says,

If you leave this room after seeing this film, and walk out and never mention Scientology again, you are perfectly free to do so. It would be stupid, but you can do it. You can also dive off a bridge or blow your brains out. That is your choice. But, if you don't walk out that way, if you continue with Scientology, we will be very happy with you. And, you will be very happy with you. You will have proven that you are a friend of yours.

According to filmmaker Mitch Brisker, he had to make the film twice. Since Anderson had become a bit of an internal celebrity within Scientology, when he left, the 1996 film had to be remade. For the second film, they hired someone to narrate without also appearing in the film. In the second version, they removed the controversial lines, "dive off a bridge or blow your brains out", which had been written into the script by Hubbard.

== See also ==
- Scientology filmography
- The Joy of Sect
