= L. Ron Hubbard House =

Writers museum in Washington D.C.

- U.S. National Register of Historic Places
- U.S. Historic district – Contributing property
- D.C. Inventory of Historic Sites
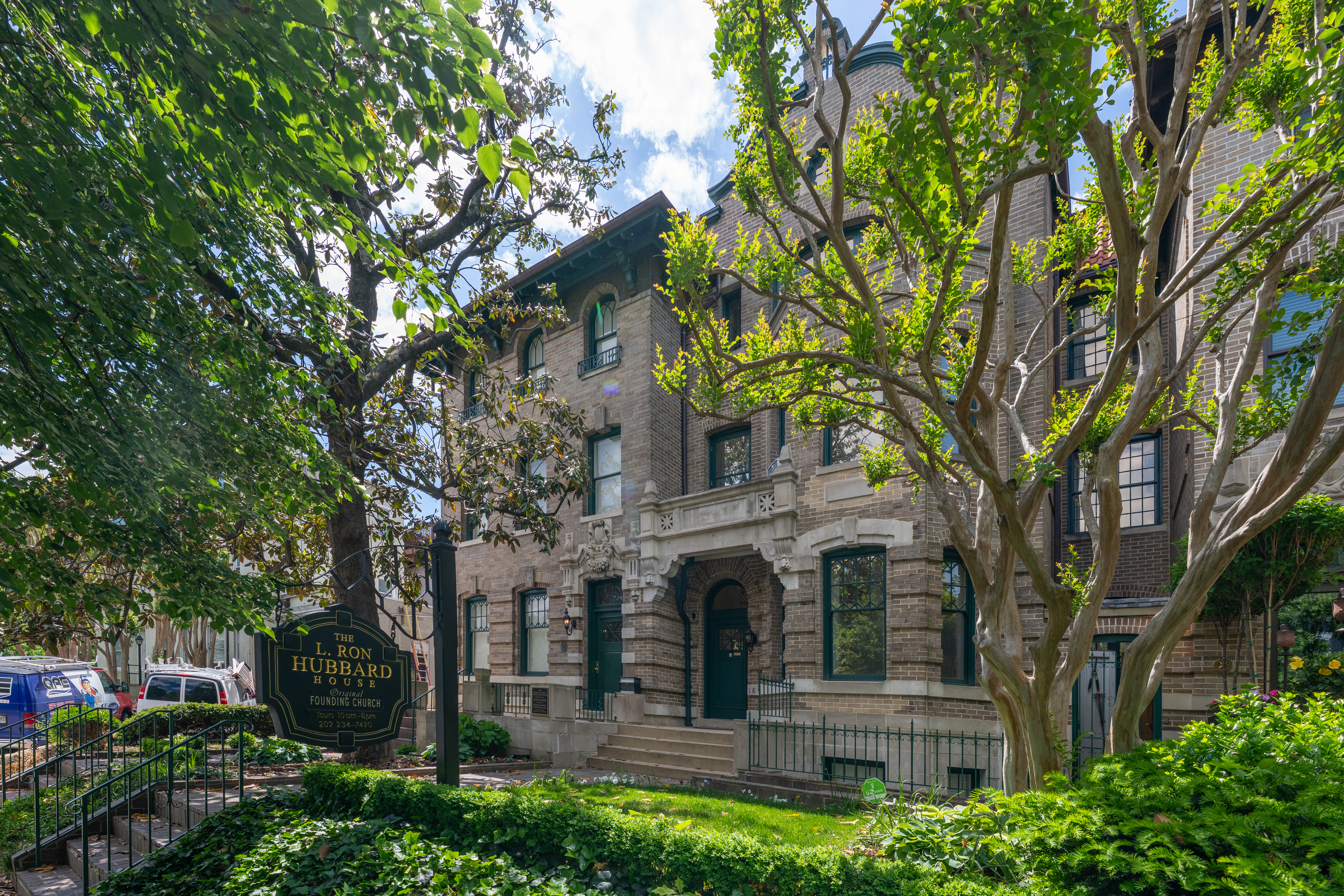
- L. Ron Hubbard House in 2026
- Location: 1812 19th Street NW Washington, D.C., U.S.
- Coordinates: 38.914581°N 77.043352°W
- Built: 1904
- Architect: Wood, Donn, & Deming
- Architectural style: Eclectic Beaux-Arts
- Part of: Dupont Circle Historic District (ID78003056)
- NRHP reference No.: 100008142

Significant dates
- Added to NRHP: September 6, 2022
- Designated CP: July 21, 1978
- Designated DCIHS: June 30, 2022

The L. Ron Hubbard House is a writer's house museum located at 1812 19th Street NW in the Dupont Circle neighborhood of Washington, D.C., USA. Public tours are given on a regular basis. After L. Ron Hubbard established Scientology in the 1950s the building housed offices of the Founding Church of Scientology and it is where he performed the first Scientology wedding. Hubbard's personal office was located in the building from 1956 to 1961. The Founding Church is now located at 1424 16th Street NW.

In 2022, the building was listed on the National Register of Historic Places (NRHP), a few months after it was added to the District of Columbia Inventory of Historic Sites. The building is also a contributing property to the Dupont Circle Historic District, a neighborhood listed on the NRHP.

== History ==
The row of buildings located at 1810–1820 19th Street NW was designed by local architectural firm Wood, Donn, & Deming in 1904 and built by John N. Nolan. Each house was sold for $17,000 and the original owner of 1812 19th Street NW was Arvine W. Johnston. Notable owners of the home during the early 20th century included United States Senators James K. Jones and Claude A. Swanson.

Hubbard purchased the home in 1955, the same year he organized the Founding Church which met at 1826 R Street NW from July 21, 1955, until 1959. The building later served as the home of the Academy of Scientology, previously located at 1845 R Street NW, and known as The Academy of Religious Arts and Sciences. Additional Scientology organizations once located at the L. Ron Hubbard House include the National Academy of American Psychology (NAAP). Hubbard performed the first Scientology wedding in the building on December 20, 1958.

In January 1963, the U.S. Food and Drug Administration (FDA) ordered a raid against the academy's 19th Street location, seizing more than 100 e-meters (electronic devices used by Scientologists) and 200 pieces of literature. The raid resulted in a lawsuit filed by the FDA against the Founding Church. In 1971, the Church and FDA reached a settlement which included a ruling that all e-meters bear a prominent warning label. The seized items were returned to the Founding Church in October 1973.

After the Founding Church sold the property in the mid-1970s, it was once again used for residential purposes. An organization called the Friends of L. Ron Hubbard repurchased the home in 2004 and the building was renovated and restored. In 2022 the property owners filed a historic landmark nomination for the building due to its connection with Hubbard and the Founding Church of Scientology. The application was approved and the building was added to the District of Columbia Inventory of Historic Sites on June 30, 2022, and the National Register of Historic Places on September 6, 2022.

== Architecture ==
The three-story L. Ron Hubbard House is an example of eclectic Beaux-Arts architecture with Mediterranean, Italiante, Georgian Revival, and Neoclassical details. The building's exterior consists of cream-colored brick, accented with stone and wood trimming. Decorative features include a two-story bay window, red-tiled roof, and Flemish gable.

Among the rooms on the first floor are the vestibule, foyer, and parlor (now a reception room), which includes bay windows overlooking 19th Street. There are fireplaces on this floor, including one that is original and features a mantel. All of the rooms on this floor are accessible via a hallway. A patio that is also accessible via the first floor is located behind the building. The second floor originally included two bedrooms, one bathroom, and a living room. The living room served as Hubbard's office and features a projecting bay window. One of the bedrooms served as the Hubbard Communications Office. The four bedrooms and two bathrooms on the third floor are now used as office space and conference area. The basement was previously a cellar accessed from outside, but was converted into an apartment in the 1970s.

== Current usage ==
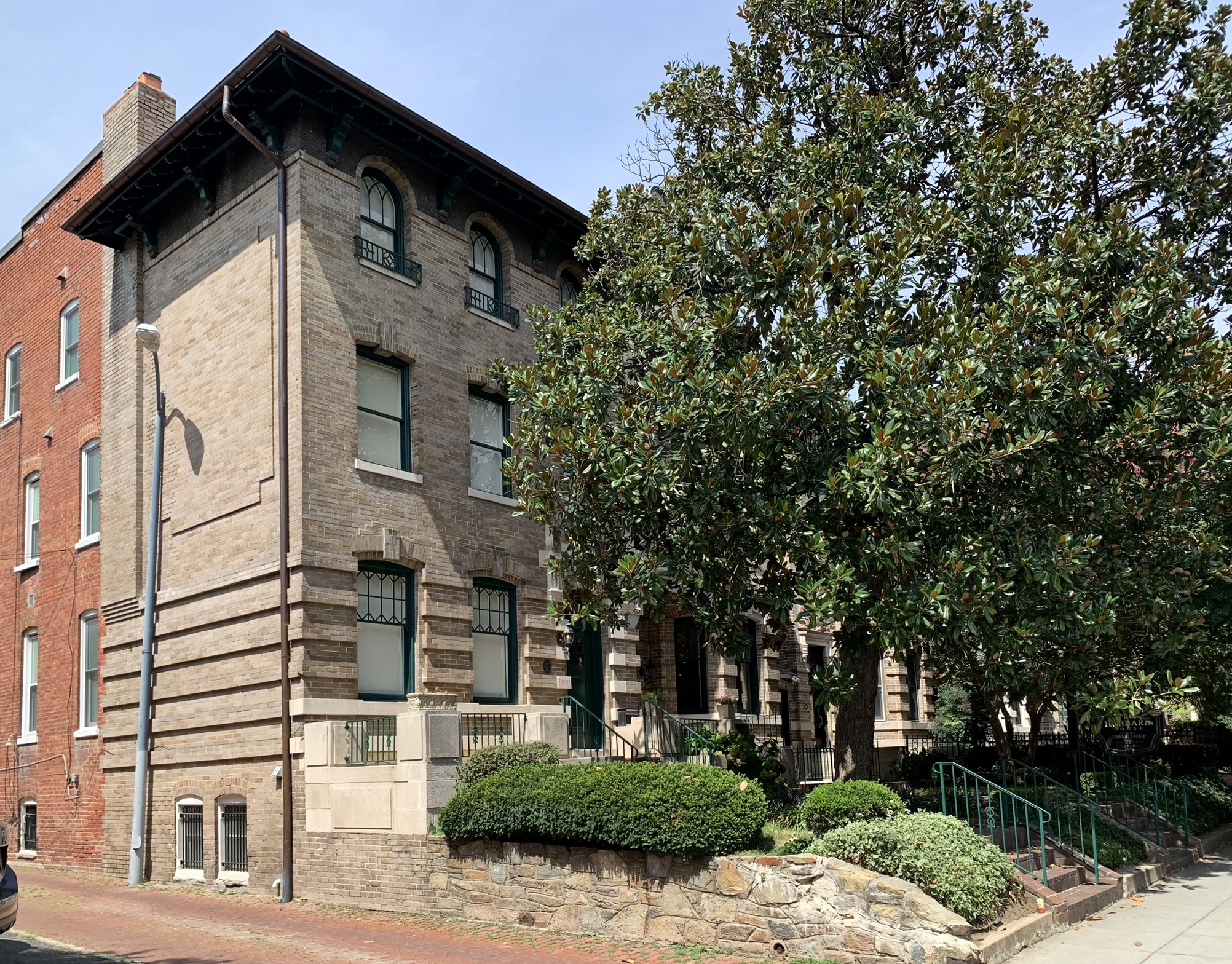
1810 and 1812 19th Street NW, both owned by Heritage Properties International, a subsidiary of Scientology's Church of Spiritual Technology.

The museum opened in 2007 following a year-long renovation to restore the building to its 1957 appearance. It contains a recreation of the Hubbard Communications Office and various literature describing Hubbard's early life. A tour of the museum is available by appointment only. The museum describes itself as "the landmark location of the first Church of Scientology where writer, explorer and founder L. Ron Hubbard worked from 1957 to 1960 and established a legacy that increasingly influences human rights, religion, literature and education."

The tour begins in the first floor parlor which features photographs of Hubbard's life exhibited in two rooms. The photographs do not include anything related to Hubbard's legal issues, including Operation Snow White. On the second floor are two rooms that serve as a library and reading room. They are decorated with 1950s era furniture and include a briefcase and globe once owned by Hubbard as well as an outfit he once wore displayed in a glass case. The rooms also include framed degrees Hubbard received from the Hubbard Association of Scientologists International and the Hubbard Dianetic Research Association. The top floor includes photographs of celebrities associated with Scientology and the group's headquarters in Clearwater, Florida, and a sign with Hubbard's quote "A Scientologist is one who controls people, environments and situations." On the same floor a promotional video about Scientology is played for museum guests. On the walls of the basement level hang photographs Hubbard took of various monuments in Washington, D.C. The basement includes a room where e-meter sessions are given.

The 2023 property value of the L. Ron Hubbard House is $2,073,400. Since October 27, 2003, ownership of the building has been registered to Heritage Properties International, a subsidiary of Scientology's Church of Spiritual Technology.

== Notes ==
1. The National Register of Historic Places registration form states the purchase price was $17,000. The National Tribune reported it as $17,500.

== See also ==
- List of museums in Washington, D.C.
- National Register of Historic Places listings in Washington, D.C.
