= Have You Lived Before This Life? =

1958 book by L. Ron Hubbard

- Cover of first edition
- Author: L. Ron Hubbard
- Language: English
- Subject: Reincarnation
- Publisher: Hubbard Association of Scientologists International
- Publication date: 1958
- Publication place: United States
- Media type: Print
- Pages: 183
- ISBN: 9780884040040
- OCLC: 13090664

Have You Lived Before This Life? is a pseudoscientific book about past lives by L. Ron Hubbard published in 1958 by the Hubbard Association of Scientologists International. The book is considered part of Scientology's canon.

== Premise ==
The book was Hubbard's response to the success of the Bridey Murphy phenomenon in the UK. Hubbard saw this as an opportunity to increase public interest in past life regression.

Have You Lived Before This Life? purports to be a collection of forty-one actual case histories of reincarnation and past-life experiences, gleaned from auditing with an e-meter at the Church of Scientology's "Fifth London Advanced Clinical Course" held in October-November 1958. Some of the stories took place on other worlds or in the extremely distant past. The book was based on an earlier privately printed softcover circulation made available to Scientology students who attended that course.

Scientology's official website says of the book: "The major portion of the book is devoted to the auditing case histories of individuals, detailing their memories of past lives. These case histories graphically show how a person’s attitudes and actions in present time can be affected by incidents in his or her past lifetimes. They also document the improvements that occurred when such incidents were addressed and run out in auditing."

== Reception ==
In 1960, there was a "storm of controversy" about the book in the small English town near his Saint Hill property; Hubbard had to issue a statement explaining that the contents from the book was not actual history, but were observations from his work into the mind.

In her book The Scandal of Scientology, Paulette Cooper examined the often fantastical nature of the past lives described, referred to by Hubbard as "space opera":

"Hubbard has devoted a special book called Have You Lived Before This Life: A Scientific Survey just to past-life case histories of Scientologists. The preface of this book also contains the names and addresses of the people who took part in the experiment so that the cynical could check its facts ... Most of the Scientologists who relived their past lives believed that they had once been plain people, or very often space people, and for plots, their histories read like a type of science-fiction sadomasochism." —Paulette Cooper

== Unpublished sequel ==
According to Cooper, Hubbard announced a sequel called Where Were You Buried? was in the works. He instructed his auditors to check all preclears for recent deaths, and then to physically locate their place of burial.

== See also ==
- Bibliography of Scientology
- Scientology beliefs and practices
