= Religious Technology Center =

Scientology holder of trademarks

- Logo of the Religious Technology Center
- Formation: 1982
- Type: Religious / commercial
- Legal status: California non-profit corporation
- Headquarters: 1710 Ivar Avenue, Suite 1100, Los Angeles CA 90028
- Location: Gilman Hot Springs, California, United States
- Chairman: David Miscavige
- Website: rtc.org

The Religious Technology Center (RTC) is an American non-profit corporation that was founded in 1982 by the Church of Scientology to control and oversee the use of all of the trademarks, symbols and texts of Scientology and Dianetics. Although RTC controls their use, those works are owned by another corporation, the Church of Spiritual Technology.

Since 1987, David Miscavige has been the head of RTC with the title "Chairman of the Board".

While exercising authority over the use of all Dianetics and Scientology materials, RTC claims that it is not involved in the day-to-day management of the Church of Scientology; that role is assigned to a separate corporation, the Church of Scientology International (CSI). According to the RTC website, "RTC stands apart as an external body which protects the Scientology religion and acts as the final arbiter of orthodoxy" and its stated purpose is "to protect the public from misapplication of the technology and to see that the religious technologies of Dianetics and Scientology remain in proper hands and are properly ministered".

In a 1993 memorandum by the Church of Scientology International (CSI) to the Internal Revenue Service, CSI wrote about RTC's personnel and its income: "RTC ... owns the Scientology religious marks and advanced technology. It licenses the marks to CSI for sublicense to subordinate churches and directly licenses the advanced technology to appropriate churches. Through this structure RTC assures that practice of the Scientology religion within the ecclesiastical hierarchy under CSI's authority as Mother Church remains strictly orthodox, in accordance with the Scientology Scriptures. This church has a staff of approximately 50 individuals and an annual budget of approximately $6.6 million, based on its annual disbursements for the most recent year for which financial statements are available."

== History ==
=== Corporate establishment and officers ===
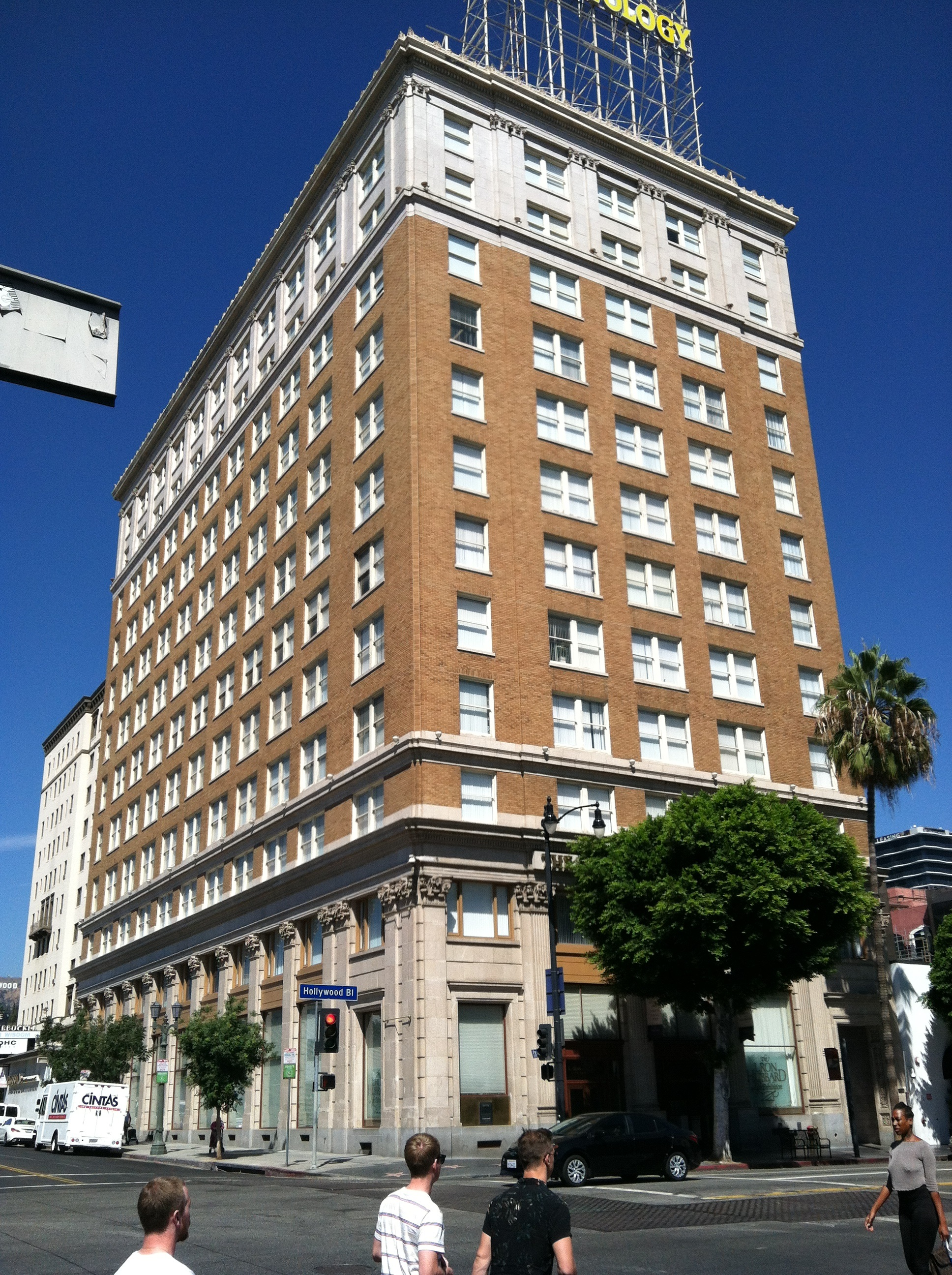
RTC offices are on the 11th floor of the Hollywood Guaranty Building. The Ivar Avenue entrance is the side entrance seen on the left side of the building. The building front (foreground) is on Hollywood Boulevard.

RTC was incorporated on January 1, 1982, in Los Angeles, California, by Terri Gamboa, David Mayo, Norman Starkey, Phoebe Mauerer, Lyman Spurlock, Julia Watson, and David Miscavige. Six months later, on June 15, 1982, the Articles of Incorporation were restated. On April 8, 1986, they were amended in order to clarify the disposition of RTC's assets upon the dissolution of the corporation.

On September 21, 1993, the following individuals held corporate positions at RTC: the Board of Trustees was composed of David Miscavige, Gregory Wilhere, and Norman Starkey. The members of RTC's Board of Directors at that time were Mark Rathbun, Warren McShane, and David Miscavige. RTC's President was Mark Rathbun, its Secretary Warren McShane, and its Treasurer Barbara Griffin.

A 2024 filing with the Secretary of State of California listed Warren McShane as CEO, Darnelle Bloomberg as Secretary, Barbara Griffin as CFO, and the principal address as 1710 Ivar Avenue, Suite 1100, Los Angeles CA 90028.

=== Obtaining tax-exempt status ===
On August 19, 1993, RTC filed an application for tax exemption under section 501(c)(3) of the Internal Revenue Code. In the same year the Internal Revenue Service granted RTC's request for exemption.

The granting of tax exemption to RTC and other Scientology corporations was preceded by years of continuous litigation between the IRS and the various entities of Scientology. According to former high-ranking executives, the Scientology organization had launched about 200 lawsuits against the IRS until 1991. During the same time, individual parishioners of Scientology had initiated 2,300 claims against the agency, challenging the denial of tax deduction for their services at Scientology organizations. Late 1991, the dispute over Scientology's tax-exempt status began to resolve through high-level meetings between David Miscavige and the then Commissioner of the IRS, Fred Goldberg, who encouraged a final resolution of the legal battle.

== Organizational structure and management ==
RTC stands hierarchically at the top of the Church of Scientology network. It has regulatory, corporate and ecclesiastical power over the policy and activities of all other Scientology management units, corporations, churches, missions and other organizations—with the only exception being the Church of Spiritual Technology. The position of RTC is notably visible in a drawing titled "The Command Channels of Scientology", which the Church of Scientology International (CSI) and RTC provided to the IRS in their application for tax-exempt status. The Church of Spiritual Technology was not included in that application.

RTC is led by David Miscavige, who has held the title of Chairman of the Board since 1987. Miscavige has been in leading positions within the Scientology management since the early 1980s. Prior to being in his current position, Miscavige had been a member of the Commodore's Messenger Organization and had been instrumental in the internal purge of the Guardian's Office, the former intelligence service and legal defense unit of the Scientology network. Between 1982 and 1987, he was the chief executive officer and later the chairman of the board of the for-profit corporation Author Services Inc. (ASI).

In 1994 Miscavige asserted that the role and position of RTC within the Scientology network "is not part of Church management, nor is it involved in the daily affairs of various Church of Scientology organizations or missions. Such representations stand in stark contrast to declarations of high-level ex-Scientologists, who have worked in the Scientology management. Former CSI security officer Andre Tabayoyon and former RTC second-in-command Jesse Prince have stated in affidavits and declarations that RTC and its chairman David Miscavige maintain de facto control of the entire Scientology network, including the Church of Scientology International.

For several years, the above-mentioned "Board of Directors RTC" consisted of David Miscavige, Marty Rathbun, and Warren McShane.

=== Control of other corporations ===
At the time of RTC's 1993 filing for tax exemption, RTC controlled four other corporations:

- Inspector General Network (IGN) has served as legal representative for RTC and secular registered owner of RTC's trademarks and service marks "in countries where contracts by religious corporations are not enforced". All corporate positions in IGN were held by members of RTC.
- WISE, Inc., at the time of Scientology's application for tax exemption, had been a dormant corporation from Delaware. It had the same functions as IGN, prior to IGN's incorporation in 1985.
- RTC Australia was incorporated in 1986 as a regional office for RTC in Australia. It is a dormant corporation and has obtained tax exempt status.
- Inspector General Network International AB (IGN Int) was incorporated in 1992 in Sweden. The organization was founded to register Scientology trademarks and service marks as a nominee for RTC in countries such as Libya or Iran "that do not recognize and will not do business with any United States entity".

== Inter-corporate licenses ==
RTC is the owner and licensor of numerous trademarks and service marks. The marks and its related intellectual property form the "Dianetics spiritual healing technology" and the "Scientology applied religious technology".

Scientology service organizations—the churches, missions and celebrity centres—derive their income from sales of this "technology" in the form of training courses, auditing, books, etc. The right to sell the "technology" is granted through license agreements with RTC as the primary license holder or with the Church of Scientology International (CSI) as a sub-licensor. RTC and CSI in return derive their corporative income from the license fees. The licensing and its related actions are a major corporate activity of these organizations.

=== Church of Spiritual Technology (CST) ===
Shortly after its inception on January 1, 1982, RTC received on May 16, 1982 "the ownership, supervision and control" of the trademarks and service marks identifying "Scientology applied religious philosophy" and "Dianetics spiritual healing technology" by the originator and founder of Scientology, L. Ron Hubbard through an "assignment agreement". This agreement was subject to an additional "Option Agreement" between Hubbard, RTC and another Scientology corporation, the Church of Spiritual Technology (CST). In two "Option Agreements" from May 1982, Hubbard granted CST the right to purchase at any time from RTC the "Marks", the "Advanced Technology" and all the rights to them for the sum of $100. Parallel and similar-sounding agreements between Hubbard, RTC and CST were created during that period concerning the "Advanced Technology", which consists of unpublished derivates of Scientology's confidential "Advanced technology" (OT Levels). Under these agreements RTC is to turn over 90% of its net income to CST. A document from 1991, reflecting the "financial money flows" of RTC during the year 1989, showed a turnover of 59% of RTC's net income towards CST.

=== Church of Scientology International (CSI) ===
RTC and Church of Scientology International (CSI) entered a license agreement on May 18, 1982, granting CSI, the new "Mother Church of Scientology", the right to use and sub-license certain of the trademarks and service marks. In return for the grant of the marks, the agreement gave RTC practically an unlimited corporate control not only over the activities of CSI but also over every organization that is a sub-licensee of CSI. (Note: Quote: "RTC shall have the right to monitor all operations of CSI and its related organizations, inspect all books, records and facilities, pertaining to use of the Marks and receive sample specimens and summaries of literature, publications and products using the marks, ... RTC may, if it ever deems it necessary or advisable, send a corrective mission to any organization authorized the Marks to correct any deviation from the standards, specifications or guidelines of this Agreement, ...")

=== Church of Scientology Western United States (CoSWUS) ===
In 1985, RTC and the Church of Scientology Western United States (CoSWUS) entered an organizational covenant granting CoSWUS the right to sell and deliver the "Advanced Technology" to its public members while guaranteeing weekly payments of 6% of the monetary value of the "Advanced Technology"-services that are being delivered to the public from CoSWUS towards RTC.

=== Church of Scientology Flag Service Organization (FSO) ===
On January 1, 1982, RTC and Church of Scientology Flag Service Organization (FSO) signed an organizational covenant with similar content to the covenant between RTC and CoSWUS.

=== Other Scientology organizations ===
RTC has entered over the years similar organizational covenants/license agreements with all the other "Advanced Organizations" (AOs) within the Scientology network. As all the AO's are integrated within a corporation, these agreements are formulated between RTC and these corporations, such as "Church of Scientology Flag Ship Service Organization, Inc." from Netherlands Antilles, the "Church of Scientology Religious Education College, Inc." from East Grinstead, England, the "Church of Scientology, Inc." from Sydney, Australia and with "Church of Scientology Advanced Organization Saint Hill Europe & Africa" (AOSH EU).

RTC has registered its service marks and trademarks in various countries all over the world. Due to certain legal restrictions for religious corporations in certain countries, RTC founded the corporation "Inspector General Network, Inc." (IGN) on June 7, 1985, which functions as a "secular" representative for RTC in those countries. In 1985 RTC entered with IGN a so-called "Reversion and Reservation Agreement", which regulated the rights and obligations with regards to the Scientology and Dianetics trademarks of the "secular" organizations IGN and "World Institute of Scientology Enterprises, Inc." (WISE Inc.), a dormant Delaware corporation.

== Litigation ==
Since its inception in 1982, RTC has been involved in various lawsuits in both state and federal courts. The majority of the cases initiated by RTC allege unauthorized use of Scientology's copyrights, service marks, or trademarks. Critics of Scientology contend that a great number of these lawsuits have been launched in order "to silence critics". The courts have agreed in some cases; in RTC v. Lerma Judge Leonie Brinkema found that the RTC's lawsuit was intended to pursue the "broader motivation" of "the stifling of criticism and dissent of the religious practices of Scientology and the destruction of its opponents".

The RTC filed a lawsuit on January 1, 1985, in the United States District Court for the Central District of California against Robin Scott and the Church of New Civilization, a Scientology splinter group, alleging theft and unauthorized use of confidential material owned by RTC. The case took over a decade to resolve, and in a 1996 appeal, the justices scolded RTC, writing "After 1,825 docket entries and nine years of pretrial litigation ... there is little doubt that RTC is playing 'fast and loose' with the judicial system ... in light of RTC's documented history of vexatious behavior, RTC's actions are indefensible".

== Knowledge reports ==
The RTC maintains a task force called the Inspector General Network, an investigatory body which operates from seven offices on four different continents. The IGN's stated function is to "keep Scientology working by ensuring the pure and ethical use of Dianetics and Scientology technology."

RTC, like the Church of Scientology, encourages the use of "Knowledge Reports" (KR) from anyone inside or outside of the Church, to report on potential misuse of the Standard Tech and copyrighted/trademarked materials. They maintain an online form in which anyone is encouraged to report any such matters that may be of concern. The use of reports is one system used by RTC to police the use of Scientology materials and the application.

== See also ==
- Sea Org
- List of Scientology organizations
- Religious Technology Center v. Netcom On-Line Communication Services, Inc.
- Religious Technology Center v Lerma
