= Scientology beliefs and practices =

Scientology's core belief is that a person is a thetan, an immortal spiritual being that resides in a physical body. A thetan has had innumerable past lives, some of which were lived in extraterrestrial cultures. Scientology doctrine states that a person undergoing the practice of auditing will eventually come across and recount a common series of past-life incidents.

Scientology describes itself as the study and handling of the spirit in relationship to itself, others, and all of life. Scientologists also believe that a thetan has innate, yet suppressed, powers and abilities which can be restored through auditing by the removal of the "reactive mind" which is said to be responsible for unconscious behavioral patterns and discomforts. Believers reach their full potential "when they understand themselves in their true relationship to the physical universe and the Supreme Being." The Church of Scientology believes that "Man is basically good, that he is seeking to survive, (and) that his survival depends on himself and his attainment of brotherhood with the universe", as stated in the Creed of the Church of Scientology.

== Beliefs ==
=== Thetan ===
In Scientology beliefs, the concept of the thetan (/ˈθeɪtən/) is the spiritual being or self that constitutes the true identity of a person, and is distinct from the body and mind it inhabits and controls. Scientology teaches that a thetan is immortal, has lived through many past lives, does not cease to exist at body-death, and is typically reincarnated into a new body. Scientology also teaches that a thetan can temporarily separate from the body in a process known as "exteriorization". The concept forms the basis of Scientology's understanding of consciousness, personal identity, and spiritual development. The term is derived from the Greek letter Θ, theta, which in Scientology represents "the source of life and life itself."

A thetan is the person himself, not his body or his name or the physical universe, his mind or anything else. It is that which is aware of being aware; the identity which IS the individual. One does not have a thetan, something one keeps somewhere apart from oneself; he is a thetan.

— The Church of Scientology, 1992

=== Physical universe (MEST) ===
MEST is a Scientology term for the physical universe, derived from the acronym for matter, energy, space, and time, and pronounced as a word. It was coined by L. Ron Hubbard in 1950, and is a key concept in Scientology. MEST contrasts with the spiritual realm of thetans, who are believed to have created the physical universe (the MEST universe) and later became trapped within it. Scientology uses related terms such as ENMEST, meaning disordered or degraded physical conditions, and MEST work, referring to manual labor. Scientology auditing techniques are intended to free thetans from the limitations of MEST and restore their native spiritual abilities.

=== Exteriorization ===
In Scientology, exteriorization refers to the thetan separating from the physical body and operating independently of it. Scientology auditing seeks to bring about this state by enabling the thetan to operate near the body without being "inside" it.

=== Past lives and immortality ===
Scientologists believe that the individual is an immortal spiritual being, a thetan, who has lived through many past lives and will continue to do so after the death of the body. Scientology distinguishes this from common definitions of reincarnation, framing it instead as the thetan taking on a newborn human body rather than being reborn as a different life form, and describes this cycle of life and death as ongoing rather than final.

Hubbard wrote about past lives as early as 1951 and presented recountings in his 1958 book Have You Lived Before This Life?. His book Mission Into Time describes a 1968 expedition undertaken to verify Hubbard's own claimed past-life memories. Scientology's elite staff level, the Sea Org, expresses this belief with its billion-year contract signed by its members, and in its motto Revenimus ("We Come Back").

Hubbard wrote much about a thetan's between-lives, and one's past-life traumas are believed to negatively influence a person's present condition. Scientology auditing aims to address these effects and recover past-life memories as part of one's spiritual advancement.

=== Eight dynamics ===
Scientology teaches that life is best understood through eight "dynamics", or urges toward survival, ranging from the individual to the supreme being. The eight dynamics are: (1) the self; (2) sex and family; (3) groups; (4) humankind; (5) all life forms; (6) the physical universe (MEST); (7) spiritual beings; and (8) the supreme being or infinity. According to Hubbard, the optimum solution to any problem is the one that brings the greatest benefit to the greatest number of dynamics. Hubbard introduced the Scientology cross in the mid-1950s as a religious symbol for Scientology, with its eight points symbolizing the eight dynamics.

=== Supreme being ===
Scientology does not define a specific doctrine of God, and members are encouraged to form their own understanding of a supreme being. Hubbard described the idea only in broad terms, placing greater emphasis on the spiritual potential of the individual than on the nature of a deity.

=== Tone scale ===
The tone scale is a numerical hierarchy of emotional states created by L. Ron Hubbard in Science of Survival (1951) and later expanded. Scientologists use it to describe and interpret human emotions and behavior, to gauge someone's value in society, and to determine how best to control or communicate with someone. The concept is a vertical scale of points from −40.0 to +40.0, each representing an emotion or other mental concept. The midpoint is 0.0, labelled "body death". From 0.0 upward is the emotional tone scale, including such points as apathy, grief, fear, anger, boredom, contentment, cheerfulness, enthusiasm, and serenity of beingness. Points below 0.0 are mental concepts rather than emotions, such as shame, blame, regret, sacrifice, hiding, and total failure. In common Scientology parlance, a person high on the tone scale is called uptone or high toned, and one low on the tone scale is called downtone or low toned.

According to Hubbard, one's tone affects a person's attitude, their ability to relate with others, and even body odors. The higher on the scale, the more emotionally alive someone would be. Lower tones, Hubbard asserted, should be exiled from society. During the auditing process, the auditor is trained to observe the client's emotional state using the tone scale, to raise an individual on the tone scale and improve his abilities.

=== ARC and KRC triangles ===
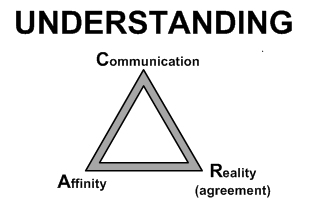
Scientology "S and double triangle" symbol, KRC triangle, and ARC triangle

Without reality or some agreement, affinity and communication are absent. Without communication, there can be no affinity or reality. It is only necessary to improve one corner of this very valuable triangle in order to improve the remaining two corners. The easiest corner to improve is Communication: improving one's ability to communicate raises at the same time his affinity for others and life, as well as expands the scope of his agreements.
—L. Ron Hubbard

The Scientology symbol is made up of two triangles with an "S" connecting them. The top triangle is called the KRC triangle, symbolizing the related concepts of knowledge, responsibility, and control. The lower triangle is called the ARC triangle, symbolizing the related concepts of affinity, reality, and communication, and all three together represent understanding. The large connecting "S" stands for "Scientology".

Scientology teaches that improving one of the three aspects of the KRC or ARC triangle will increase the other two. In the ARC triangle, communication is held to be the most important.

Among Scientologists, the letters ARC are used as an affectionate greeting in personal communication, for example, at the end of a letter. Social problems are ascribed to breakdowns in ARC – in other words, a lack of agreement on reality, a failure to communicate effectively, or a failure to develop affinity. These can take the form of overts – harmful acts against another, either intentionally or by omission – which are usually followed by withholds – efforts to conceal the wrongdoing, which further increase the level of tension in the relationship.

=== Morals and ethics ===
Scientology teaches that progress on The Bridge to Total Freedom requires and enables attaining high moral and ethical standards. According to Hubbard, the goal of ethics is to remove impediments to survival, and ethics is essentially a tool to "get technology in", meaning Scientology's use of the term technology.

=== Hostility toward psychiatry ===
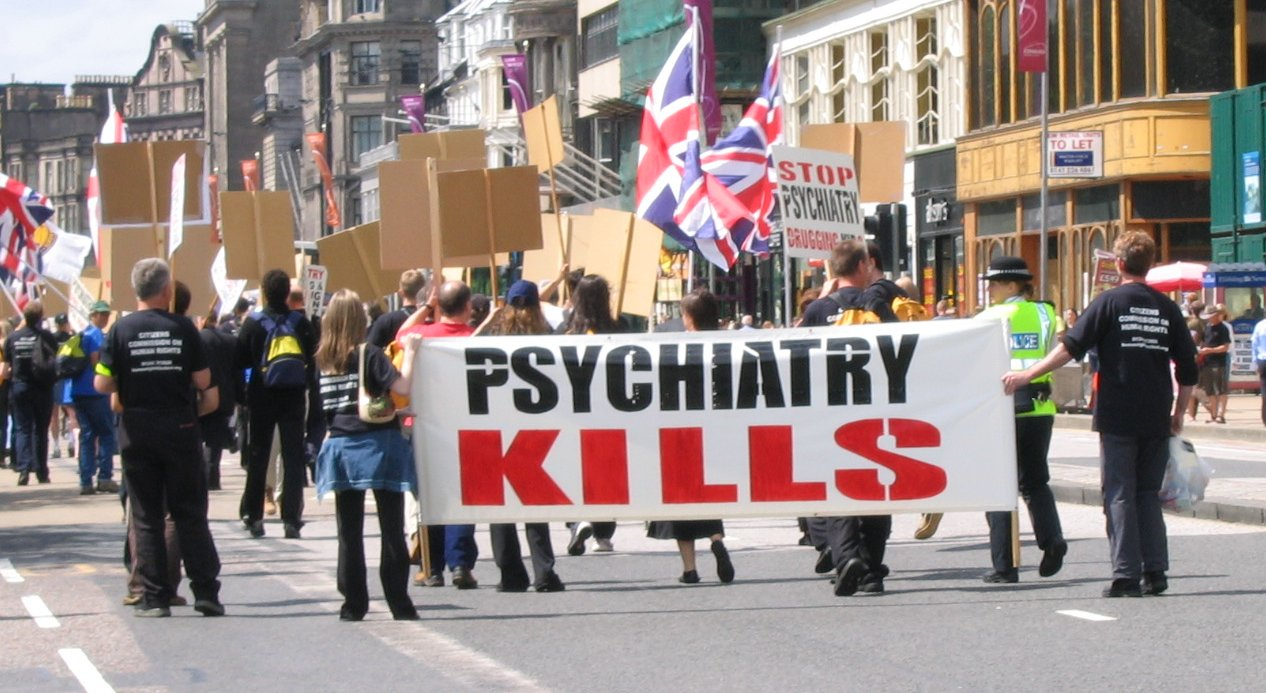
Scientologists at an anti-psychiatry demonstration

In the early 1950s, the psychiatric establishment rejected Hubbard's theories, and Hubbard thereafter vehemently opposed psychiatry and psychology. He taught that psychiatrists were responsible for genocidal acts in the ancient past, including in the Xenu narrative. Scientology views psychiatry as a barbaric and corrupt profession and considers mental illness a fraud. Initially, Hubbard taught that psychosis was not something Scientology addressed, but later developed the Introspection Rundown, a brutal and inhumane method that allegedly solves psychotic episodes without psychiatric intervention.

Scientology established the anti-psychiatry lobby group Citizens Commission on Human Rights (CCHR) which operates an exhibit Psychiatry: An Industry of Death. They allege that psychiatrists were responsible for the Holocaust, apartheid and 9/11. CCHR has helped legislators draft bills, though bills in Florida and Utah failed which would have made it a crime for school teachers to suggest to parents that their child might be suffering from a mental health condition.

== Practices ==
The Church makes it clear that Hubbard is considered the sole source of Dianetics and Scientology: "The Scientology religion is based exclusively upon L. Ron Hubbard's research, writings and recorded lectures – all of which constitute the Scriptures of the religion." His work, recorded in 500,000 pages of writings, 6,500 reels of tape and 42 films, is archived for posterity. The Religious Technology Center holds "the ultimate ecclesiastical authority and the pure application of L. Ron Hubbard's religious technologies."

Individuals applying Hubbard's techniques who are not officially connected to the Church of Scientology are considered part of the "Free Zone". Some of these individuals were litigated against for using and modifying the practices for their own use and that of others, thereby infringing the law on patent, trademarks, or trade secrets.

=== Auditing ===
The central practice of Scientology is an activity known as auditing, which seeks to elevate an adherent to a state of Clear, one of freedom from the influences of the reactive mind. The practice is one wherein a counselor called an "auditor" addresses a series of questions to a preclear, observes and records the preclear's responses, and acknowledges them. An essential element in all forms of auditing is not to suggest answers to the preclear or invalidate or degrade what the preclear says in response. It is of utmost importance that the auditor create a safe and distraction-free session environment.

The term clear derives from a calculator button that deletes previous calculations. According to Scientology beliefs, Clears are "optimal individuals", and "they have been cleared of false information and memories of traumatic experiences that prevent them from adapting to the world around them in a natural and appropriate fashion." Scientologists believe that clears become more successful in their daily lives and are "healthier, experience less stress, and possess better communication skills than non-Scientologists."

"Auditing" is sometimes considered controversial, because auditing sessions are permanently recorded and stored within "preclear folders". Scientologists believe that the practice of auditing helps them overcome the debilitating effects of traumatic experiences, most of which have accumulated over a multitude of lifetimes. The folders are kept in accordance with the Priest/Penitent legal parameters which do not allow these folders to be seen or used for any other purpose or seen by any others who are not directly involved in supervising that person's auditing progress.

Auditors are required to become proficient with the use of their E-meters. The device measures the subject's galvanic skin response like a polygraph (lie detector), but with only one electrode per hand rather than multiple sensors. The E-meter is primarily used in auditing, which "aims to remove (engrams) to produce a state of 'clear.'" Auditors do not receive final certification until they have completed an internship, and have demonstrated a proven ability in the skills they have been trained in. Auditors often practice their auditing with each other, as well as friends or family. Church members sometimes pair up during training, doing the same course simultaneously so that they can audit each other up through the various Scientology levels.

According to scholar Harriet Whitehead, the Church of Scientology "has developed a fine-tooled hierarchically organized system of audit (training) sessions where the technology of these sessions, in fact, is the treatment leading to processes of renunciation and eventually reformulation in the individual," which is similar to psychoanalysis.

==== Traumatic memories and the reactive mind ====
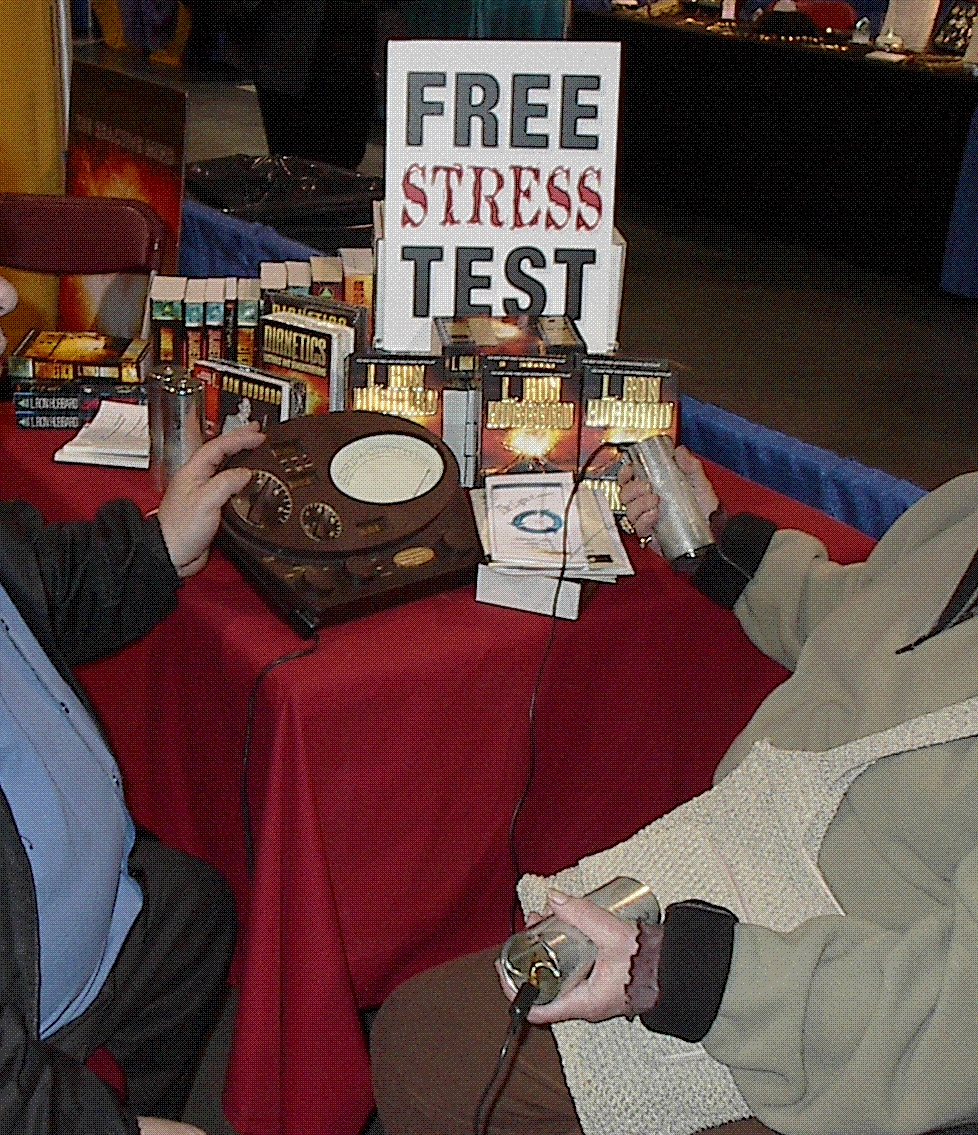
A Scientologist introduces the E-meter to a potential student.

Among Scientology's basic tenets are the belief that human beings are immortal, that a person's life experience transcends a single lifetime, and that human beings possess infinite capabilities. Scientology presents two major divisions of the mind. The "reactive mind" is thought to absorb all pain and emotional trauma, while the "analytical mind" is a rational mechanism which is responsible for consciousness. The reactive mind stores mental images which are not readily available to the analytical (conscious) mind; these are referred to as "engrams". Engrams are painful and debilitating; as they accumulate, people move further away from their true identity. Avoiding this fate is Scientology's basic goal. Dianetic auditing is one way by which the Scientologist may progress toward the 'Clear' state, winning gradual freedom from the reactive mind's engrams, and acquiring certainty of their reality as a thetan. Hubbard's differentiation of the reactive mind and the analytical mind forms one of the basic tenets of Dianetics. The analytical mind is similar to the conscious mind, which processes daily information and events. The reactive mind produces the mind's "aberrations" such as "fear, inhibition, intense love and hate and various psychosomatic ills" which are recorded as "engrams".

Scientology believes people have hidden abilities that have not yet been fully realized. It is believed that increased spiritual awareness and physical benefits are accomplished through counseling sessions referred to as "auditing". Through auditing, it is said that people can solve their problems and free themselves of engrams. This restores them to their natural condition as thetans and enables them to be "at cause" in their daily lives, responding rationally and creatively to life events rather than reacting to them under the direction of stored engrams. Accordingly, those who study Scientology materials and receive auditing sessions advance from a status of "Preclear" to "Clear" and "Operating Thetan". Scientology's utopian aim is to "clear the planet", a world in which everyone has cleared themselves of their engrams.

Auditing is a one-on-one session with a Scientology counselor or "auditor". It bears a superficial similarity to confession or pastoral counseling, but the auditor records and stores all information received and does not dispense forgiveness or advice the way a pastor or priest might do. Instead, the auditor's task is to help people discover and understand engrams and their limiting effects for themselves. Most auditing requires an E-meter, a device that measures minute changes in electrical resistance through the body when a person holds electrodes (metal "cans"), and a small current is passed through them.

Scientology believes that watching for changes in the E-meter's display helps locate engrams. Once an area of concern has been identified, the auditor asks the individual specific questions about it to help them eliminate the engram and uses the E-meter to confirm that the engram's "charge" has been dissipated and the engram has been cleared. As the individual progresses, the focus of auditing moves from simple to increasingly complex engrams. At the more advanced OT auditing levels, Scientologists perform solo auditing sessions, acting as their own auditors.

=== Training ===
Scientologists also undergo training aside from auditing, which consists of several levels of courses about daily life improvement using various tools and auditing techniques so that members can perform the same procedure as other Scientologists.

Scientology discourages secondary interpretation of its writings. Scientologists are taught to consult only official sources, and never convey their own interpretation of concepts in their own words.

=== Study Technology ===
Hubbard described three barriers to study: lack of mass, too steep a gradient, and the misunderstood word. Scientology teaches that a student who learns only ideas, without also seeing the thing in real life that they are studying (the mass) or at least a picture of it, would suffer feeling dizzy or bored or angry—the remedy would be to provide the student with some mass of the thing they are studying. If a student does not know the fundamentals of a subject and advances too quickly to higher levels, they would feel confused—the remedy for too steep a gradient would be to drop back down to the earlier level the person thought they knew well but did not. When a student reads past a word they do not fully understand, they would "go blank", yawn, or seem distracted—the remedy would be to find the word they did not know and look it up in a dictionary, then continue studying.

In Scientology, "misinformation or miscommunication is analogous to original sin, inhibiting individual growth and relationships with others." The "misunderstood word" is a key concept in Scientology, and failure in reading comprehension is attributed to it. Scientology focuses heavily on dictionaries. The Church of Scientology includes glossaries in most books and even publishes several dictionaries covering Scientology-specific terminology, words, phrases, and abbreviations. Critics have accused Hubbard of "loading the language" and using Scientology jargon to keep Scientologists from interacting with others outside of Scientology.

=== The Bridge to Total Freedom ===
The Bridge to Total Freedom, also known as the "Classification, Gradation and Awareness Chart", is Scientology's primary road map to guide a person through the sequential steps to attain Scientology's concept of spiritual freedom. In Dianetics: The Modern Science of Mental Health, Hubbard used the analogy of a bridge: "We are here at a bridge between one state of Man and a next. We are above the chasm which divides a lower from a higher plateau and this chasm marks an artificial evolutionary step in the progress of Man. [...] In this handbook we have the basic axioms and a therapy which works. For God's sake, get busy and build a better bridge!" The current Classification, Gradation, and Awareness Chart is printed with red ink on white paper and hangs as a poster in every Scientology organization. A newcomer to Scientology starts the Bridge at the bottom of the chart and rises through the levels, perhaps reaching the level of Clear, then continuing upward through the OT Levels to higher states of awareness and ability.

=== Detoxification and purification ===
The Purification Rundown is a controversial detoxification program developed by Scientology's founder L. Ron Hubbard and used by the Church of Scientology as an introductory service. Scientologists consider it the only effective way to deal with the long-term effects of drug abuse or toxic exposure. The program combines exercise, dietary supplements and long stays in a sauna (up to five hours a day for five weeks). It is promoted variously as religious or secular, medical or purely spiritual, depending on context.

Narconon is a drug education and rehabilitation program founded on Hubbard's beliefs about toxins and purification. Narconon is offered in the United States, Canada and some European countries; its Purification Program uses a regimen composed of sauna, physical exercise, vitamins and diet management, combined with auditing and study.

=== Psychosis and introspection ===
The Introspection Rundown is a controversial Church of Scientology auditing process that is intended to handle a psychotic episode or complete mental breakdown. Introspection is defined for this rundown as a condition where the person is "looking into one's own mind, feelings, reactions, etc." The Introspection Rundown came under public scrutiny after the death of Lisa McPherson in 1995.

== Institutional practices ==
These are organizational practices of the Church of Scientology, not spiritual practices.

=== Ethics, justice and disconnection ===
Stephen A. Kent describes Scientology ethics as "a peculiar brand of morality that uniquely benefitted [the Church of Scientology] [...] In plain English, the purpose of Scientology ethics is to eliminate opponents, then eliminate people's interests in things other than Scientology. In this 'ethical' environment, Scientology would be able to impose its courses, philosophy, and 'justice system' – its so-called technology – onto society."

Scientology's internal ethics and justice system is designed to deal with unethical or antisocial behavior. Ethics officers are present in every org; they are tasked with ensuring correct application of Scientology technology and deal with violations such as non-compliance with standard procedures or any other behavior adversely affecting an org's performance, ranging from errors and misdemeanors to crimes and suppressive acts, as defined by internal documents. Scientology teaches that spiritual progress requires and enables the attainment of high "ethical" standards. In Scientology, rationality is stressed over morality. Actions are considered ethical if they promote survival across all eight dynamics, thus benefiting the greatest number of people or things possible while harming the fewest.

While Scientology states that many social problems are the unintentional results of people's imperfections, it asserts that there are also genuinely malevolent individuals. Hubbard believed that approximately 80 percent of all people are what he called social personalities – people who welcome and contribute to the welfare of others. The remaining 20 percent of the population, Hubbard thought, were suppressive persons. According to Hubbard, only about 2.5 percent of this 20 percent are hopelessly antisocial personalities; these make up the small proportion of truly dangerous individuals in humanity: "the Adolf Hitlers and the Genghis Khans, the unrepentant murderers and the drug lords." Scientologists believe that any contact with suppressive or antisocial individuals harms one's spiritual condition, necessitating disconnection.

In Scientology, defectors who turn into critics of the movement are declared suppressive persons, and the Church of Scientology has a reputation for moving aggressively against such detractors. A Scientologist who is actively in communication with a suppressive person and, as a result, shows signs of antisocial behavior is referred to as a potential trouble source.

=== Fair game ===
The term fair game describes policies and practices carried out by the Church against people they perceive as their enemies. Hubbard established the policy in the 1950s, in response to criticism both from within and outside his organization. Individuals or groups who are "fair game" are judged to be a threat to the Church and, according to the policy, can be punished and harassed using any and all means possible.

Hubbard and his followers targeted many individuals as well as government officials and agencies, including a program of covert and illegal infiltration of the IRS and other U.S. government agencies during the 1970s. They also conducted private investigations, character assassination and legal action against the Church's critics in the media. The policy remains in effect and has been defended by the Church of Scientology as a core religious practice.

=== Contracts and legal waivers ===
The Church of Scientology requires that all members sign a legal waiver which covers their relationship with the Church of Scientology before engaging in Scientology services.

=== Rituals ===
According to religious studies scholar Mikael Rothstein, Scientology rituals can be categorized in four ways: first, rituals performed for spiritual transformation, primarily auditing; second, collective ceremonies usually called events; third, rites of passage, including weddings and funerals; and fourth, those that mimic Christian rituals.

==== Sunday service ====
Scientology holds Sunday services that consist primarily of readings of L. Ron Hubbard's teachings and the Creed of Scientology. Scholars note that Sunday services function largely as a public-facing ritual, modeled on familiar Christian forms, and are often attended by visitors or newcomers. Attendance is not expected of Scientologists, and most do not attend.

==== Events celebrated ====
Scientology holds several main events each year, commemorating milestones in Scientology's history.

- March 13 is L. Ron Hubbard's birthday when the Church celebrates Scientology's achievements during the prior year
- May 9 is Dianetics Day, marking the anniversary of the 1950 publication of Dianetics
- June 9 is the Maiden Voyage event, anniversary of the first trip of their ship Freewinds.
- August 12 is Sea Org Day, when rank and promotion ceremonies take place
- the second Sunday in September is Auditor's Day
- October 7 is the IAS event, celebrating the anniversary of the founding of the International Association of Scientologists
- December 31 is a New Year's event

Of these dates, the Church of Scientology routinely organizes major events for New Year's in Los Angeles, the Birthday event in Clearwater, Florida, several events during the Maiden Voyage week, and the IAS event in England. These occasions are attended by large numbers of Scientologists, broadcast internally, and serve both as fundraising opportunities and promotional showcases for the Church's membership.
