= Galaxy Press =

Publishing company under the Church of Scientology

Galaxy Press, Inc.

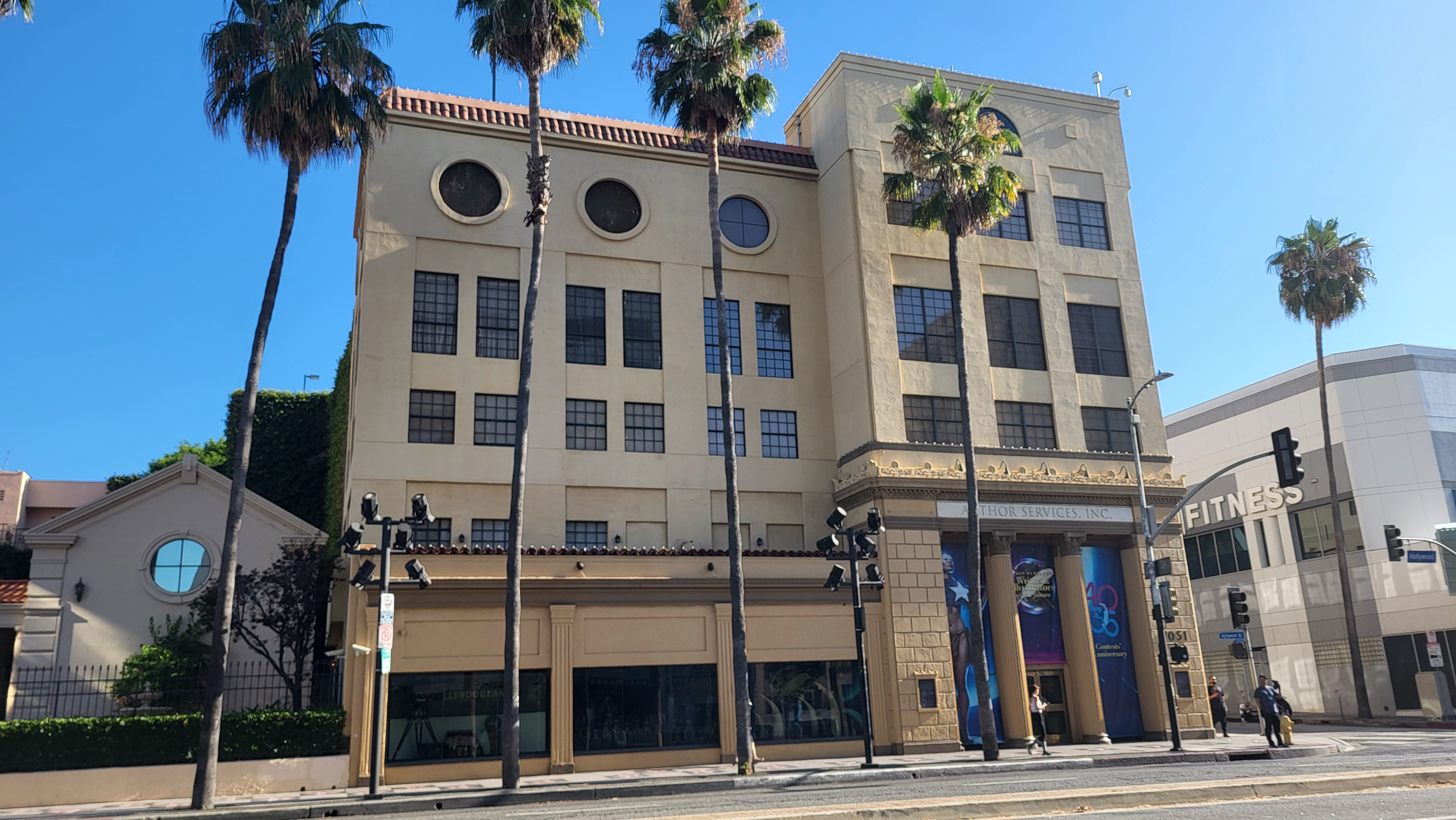
- Industry: Publishing
- Genre: Fiction
- Predecessor: Galaxy Productions, Inc. (1982–1999); Author Services, Inc. (1981–2015); Galaxy Press, LLC (2002–2015)
- Founded: February 24, 2015; 11 years ago in California
- Headquarters: 7051 Hollywood Blvd, Suite 200, Los Angeles, California, USA
- Products: Fiction works of L. Ron Hubbard
- Owner: Church of Scientology
- Website: galaxypress.com

Galaxy Press (formerly Author Services) represents the literary, theatrical and musical works of the late Scientology founder L. Ron Hubbard, and publishes Hubbard's fiction works and the anthologies of the Writers of the Future contest.

== History ==
During the Church of Scientology's "corporate sort out" project in the early 1980s, Bridge Publications, Inc. (later renamed to Bridge Publications Incorporated) and Author Services, Inc. (ASI) were both incorporated. Bridge Publications was to be the publisher of the Scientology works as a non-profit corporation, and Author Services was to be the publisher of Hubbard's fiction works as a for-profit corporation. ASI was incorporated in the state of California on October 13, 1981, and was wholly owned by the Church of Spiritual Technology by 1993. In 2015, ASI was merged into Galaxy Press, LLC, which was then renamed to Galaxy Press, Inc.

== Activities ==
Since its incorporation in 1981, ASI managed L. Ron Hubbard's personal, business and literary affairs. After Hubbard's death in 1986, ASI continued to represent his literary and musical works worldwide. Nineteen of Hubbard's books have been on The New York Times best sellers list, and his works have been translated into 72 languages.

ASI has administered the Writers and Illustrators of the Future contest. The contest had been established and sponsored by Hubbard in 1983.

In 2005, ASI received a verification certificate from Guinness World Records on behalf of Hubbard for being the "most translated author" in the world (since surpassed in 2014 by Paulo Coelho.)

While ASI presents Hubbard's fiction and secular works under the Galaxy Press label, his Scientology-related writings are represented by Bridge Publications (New Era Publications outside North America).

The 200-seat Author Services (ASI) Theater reopened in October 2008 after a three-year hiatus to resume its live presentations of L. Ron Hubbard's original series of pulp fiction classic tales penned during the 1930s and 1940s and recently adapted into multi-cast audio performances.

In 2008, they announced they would be releasing eighty volumes containing the works Hubbard wrote for pulp magazines, at the rate of four titles every four or five months. The release was scheduled to be accompanied by a $1.9 million marketing campaign, including commercials on programs popular with middle school children.
