= Scientology filmography =

This is an incomplete filmography of Scientology and Scientology-related films, videos, and audiovisual materials produced within the Church of Scientology and its related organizations.

== 1980s ==
- The Case He Couldn't Crack (1981)

70-minute feature film directed by L. Ron Hubbard and starring Mary Jane Shippen, who also appeared in the Herschell Gordon Lewis film Miss Nymphet's Zap-In.

- The Story of Book One (1987)

A highly dramatic retelling of how Hubbard developed Dianetics. The actor playing Hubbard never shows his face, filmed only with his back to the camera, and never speaks a word of dialogue. The tagline from the movie poster is "The psychiatrists tried to ignore it. The medicos tried to stop it. There was only one route left..."

- The Married Couple (1988)

A marriage-counseling film shown in Scientology facilities. Created by Golden Era Productions.

== 1990s ==
- Assists (1995)

A training film for Volunteer Ministers on Scientology Assists such as the Touch assist. The film's tagline is "Would you know what to do?" It is unclear what the difference is between this film and the one of the same name released in 1989.

- Orientation: A Scientology Information Film (1996)

A 37-minute Orientation film created by Golden Era Productions and shown only in Scientology facilities. A confidentiality agreement must be signed before watching the film. The final scene includes the quote, "If you leave this room after seeing this film, and walk out and never mention Scientology again, you are perfectly free to do so. It would be stupid, but you can do it. You can also dive off a bridge or blow your brains out. That is your choice."

== 2000s ==
- This is Scientology (2005)

A 48-minute DVD of a speech by David Miscavige at the 35th anniversary of the Church of Scientology Celebrity Centre International.

- United music video

Created by Taron Lexton and the Church of Scientology International Human Rights Department.

- Human Rights public service announcements (2006)

A series of thirty PSA television commercials, 30-second and 60-second. Released to the media in June 2006 and compiled to a DVD for general release in October 2006. youthforhumanrights.org, Youth for Human Rights International.

- The Way to Happiness promotional videos (2006)

A wide variety of promotional videos for the Scientology organization The Way to Happiness are available as QuickTime downloads on their own website. Includes television ads, news clips, and the "Way to Happiness Outdoors Club Video".

- The Golden Age of Knowledge for Eternity (2007)

Filmed 3 hour speech given by David Miscavige at the OT Summit 2007, introducing the new editions of the Scientology books and lectures.

== See also ==
- Bibliography of Scientology
