= List of Scientology organizations =

Current and past corporations of Scientology conglomerate

The worldwide network of Church of Scientology organizations consists of numerous entities and corporations, located in the United States as well as in other countries. All these organizations are interrelated and connected through an internal hierarchy called the "Command Channels of Scientology". At the top are Religious Technology Center, Church of Spiritual Technology, and Church of Scientology International, who own and license the Scientology trademarks and service marks to the other organizations within the network. These management organizations are staffed solely by Sea Org personnel.

Within the upper Church management echelon are several corporations with specific functions of publication, distribution, administration, and finances. Examples are the Scientology-owned publishing house Bridge Publications, and World Institute of Scientology Enterprises which promotes and sells Scientology "secular" services to businesses and entrepreneurs.

Below the Scientology management levels are Scientology service organizations ("Churches"), which deliver Scientology services to its members, and so-called secular organizations which seek to introduce L. Ron Hubbard's "Scientology Technology" into various sectors of society such as Citizens Commission on Human Rights, an organization that seeks to abolish any form of psychiatry. Below these levels are volunteer organizations run by Scientologists such as local chapters of The Way to Happiness campaign, and Clear Expansion Committees which have as their goal the clearing of their local communities and helping to establish a Scientology world.

In a response to questions by the Internal Revenue Service (IRS) with regard to its application for tax exempt status, the Church of Scientology International provided to the IRS a list of Scientology corporations and entities, categorized by their functions and activities.

Key

† is used to indicate organizations that are known to no longer be in operation

== Principal organizations ==
- Church of Scientology (COS) — overarching term for the conglomerate of interrelated Scientology organizations; not a corporate entity itself. (See § The term "Church of Scientology" below)
- Religious Technology Center (RTC) — owns the religious marks and licenses them to other organizations
- Church of Spiritual Technology (CST) — beneficiary of most of L. Ron Hubbard's estate; backup owner of religious marks to RTC; operates programs to preserve the scriptures for the future After being awarded tax-exempt status, it received Hubbard's copyrights and patents from Mr. Hubbard's Trust. Hubbard's books that are published posthumously are copyrighted by CST under the fictitious business name "L. Ron Hubbard Library"
- Church of Scientology International (CSI) — the mother church; incorporated in 1981
- † Church of Scientology of California (CSC) — was the senior management organization in the United States; replaced by the new corporation Church of Scientology International in order to hide assets during the case of Wollersheim v. Church of Scientology of California; terminated 2004

== Management organizations ==
- Sea Org (SO) — an unincorporated managerial and fraternal organization, with membership extending across a range of other branches and entities
- Commodore's Messenger Organization
- Watchdog Committee (WDC) — monitor the other management bodies
- Senior Executive Strata
- Flag Bureaux — middle management
- Celebrity Centre International (CC INT) — a service organization as well as the management organization for the Celebrity Centre network
- Scientology Missions International (SMI) — auxiliary to CSI; acts as mother church to missions
- International Hubbard Ecclesiastical League of Pastors (IHELP) — auxiliary to CSI; acts as mother church to field ministers
- International Management Executive Committee (IMEC) — responsible for the performance of the Church in its various activities and functions
- Continental Liaison Office (CLO) — liaison between CSI and lower Churches of Scientology
- † Executive Council Worldwide (ECWW) — UK predecessor to Flag Bureaux
- † Hubbard Association of Scientologists International (HASI) — formed 1954 as a "religious fellowship", acting as the Mother Church over all the new franchised "churches" of Scientology (formerly "secular" centers).

== Trademark service organizations ==
- Inspector General Network (IGN) — auxiliary to RTC for licensing the religious marks in certain countries
  - IGN International AB
  - Dianetics Centers International (DCI)
  - Dianetics Foundation International (DFI)
- Hubbard Dianetics Foundation (HDF) — disseminating Dianetics; auxiliary to CSI
- WISE, Inc.

== Financial trusts ==
- Author's Family Trust
- Mr. Hubbard's Trust — receiver of book and patent royalties. It held Hubbard's copyrights and patents until the Church of Spiritual Technology was awarded tax-exempt status, at which point the properties were distributed to CST.
- Church of Scientology Religious Trust (CSRT) — Under International Sea Org Reserves Trust. From 1981 to 1985 held reserve funds for USA Scientology entities. In 1992 CSRT launched the Super Power Expansion Project to fund and construct the Flag Building.
- Scientology International Reserves Trust (SIRT) — since 1988 holds reserve funds for foreign Scientology entities
- United States Parishioners Trust (USPT) — held advance contributions for CSWUS and CSFSO services; ordered to be dissolved as part of the Scientology 1993 IRS closing agreement
- Trust for Scientologists (TFS) — holds advance contributions to CSFSO from foreign individuals
- Flag Ship Trust (FST) — formed in 1985 as a donation repository for the purchase of the ship Freewinds; then used as a repository for Scientology central reserve accounts; owns the following entities:
  - San Donato Properties, S .A. — owns the ship
  - Transcorp Services S. A. — financed the purchase of the ship
  - Majestic Cruise Lines — operates the ship
  - FSS Organization — for paying taxes in the Netherlands Antilles
  - MCL Services — provides shore support in Curacao
- † Church of Scientology Freewinds Relay Office, Inc. (CSFRO) — was the registrar (sales) for FSSO/Freewinds services; now run by FSSO
- † International Publications Trust (IPT) — was sole stockholder of Bridge and New Era
  - † Publications Int Limited (PIL) — was an intermediary corporation between IPT and New Era; dissolved 1992
- Building Management Services (BMS) — holder of real estate for CSI

== Financial service organizations ==
- SOR Services Ltd. — administers TFS affairs; wholly owned by SIRT
- Nesta Investments Ltd.
- FSO Oklahoma Investments Corporation (FSOOIC) — wholly owned subsidiary of CSFSO; CSFSO made investments through FSOOIC
- † Theta Management Ltd. (TML) — was part of the creation of the IAS. It was dissolved in 1993 and funds transferred to IASA.

== Publishing houses and media ==
- Bridge Publications Inc. (BPI, Bridge) — publishes books and print material for the USA and Canada; previously owned by IPT
- Galaxy Press — publishes fiction works of L. Ron Hubbard
  - Author Services, Inc. (ASI) was established in 1981 as a wholly owned subsidiary of CST to supervise the use of Hubbard's literary properties
  - In 1999 Galaxy Productions, Inc. (est. 1982) was merged into Author Services, Inc.
  - Galaxy Press, LLC was established in 2002.
  - In January 2015 Author Services, Inc. was merged into Galaxy Press, LLC.
  - In February 2015 Galaxy Press, LLC was converted into Galaxy Press, Inc.
- Golden Era Productions (Gold) — produces audio recordings, motion pictures and E-meters
- New Era Publications International, ApS (New Era) — publishes books and print material for all non-USA/non-Canada locations; previously owned by IPT New Era subsidiaries include:
  - New Era Publications UK, Ltd. (United Kingdom)
  - New Era Publications Italia, s.r.l (Italy)
  - New Era Publications Deutschland, GmbH (Germany)
  - New Era Publications France
  - SARL New Era Publications Japan, Inc.
  - New Era Publications Espana S.A. (Spain)
  - New Era Publications Australia Pty. Ltd.
  - New Era Publications Group (Russia)
  - Era Dinamica Editores s.A. de C. V. (Mexico)
  - Importaciones y Exportaciones Nueva Civilizacion S.A. de C.V. (Mexico)
  - Continental Publications (Pty) Ltd. (South Africa)
  - New Era Publications Israel
- Scientology Publications Ltd.
- Scientology Media Productions and Scientology Network
- † Distribution Center Inc. — 1960s organization that sold books, booklets, and E-meters; associated with Founding Church of Scientology

== Secular and social management entities ==
- Association for Better Living and Education (ABLE) — manages the social betterment programs
  - Narconon International — drug rehabilitation program formed in 1970
  - Applied Scholastics (APS) — educational program
  - Criminon International — criminal rehabilitation program
  - The Way to Happiness Foundation International (TWTH) — public morality program
  - Social Betterment Properties International (SBPI) — real estate management corporation for ABLE
- Citizens Commission on Human Rights (CCHR) — dedicated to eradicating psychiatry
- National Commission on Law Enforcement and Social Justice (NCLE) — exposing abuses of human rights in law enforcement and other government agencies
- Foundation for Religious Freedom — safeguarding religious freedom (see also New Cult Awareness Network)
- World Institute of Scientology Enterprises (WISE) — membership organization for Scientology businesspeople and professionals
  - Charter committees — subset of WISE; locally deals with civil disputes amongst Scientologists
  - Hubbard College of Administration (HCA) — teaches Hubbard's administration techniques
- † Scientology Defense Fund Trust (SDFT) — was for defending Scientologists; dormant
- † Social Coordination Bureau of the Guardian's Office (SoCo) — predecessor to ABLE

== Service organizations ==
- Church of Scientology Flag Service Organization (CSFSO, FSO) — ministers the highest levels of auditor training through Class XII and auditing through New OT VII
- Church of Scientology Flag Ship Service Organization (CSFSSO, FSSO) — ministers the highest level of Scientology auditing, New OT VIII
- Church of Scientology Western United States (CSWUS, COSWUS) — as of 1993 CSWUS comprised 6 organizations: ASHO, AOLA, Continental Liaison Office West U.S. (CLO WUS), Commodore's Messenger Organization Pacific (CMO PAC), Pacific Base Crew (PBC), and Church of Scientology of San Diego. (Note: Church of Scientology Western United States was created by renaming the Church of Scientology of San Diego corporation in 1982 or 1985; COS San Diego had originally been incorporated in 1971. COS San Diego was later reincorporated separately in 1994.)
- Saint Hill organizations (SH) — offer the training called the Saint Hill Special Briefing Course
  - American Saint Hill Organization (ASHO) — Los Angeles, California (part of CSWUS)
- Advanced organizations (AO) — offer advanced auditing
  - Advanced Organization of Los Angeles (AOLA) — Los Angeles, California (part of CSWUS)
- Combination Advanced and Saint Hill:
  - Church of Scientology Religious Education College, Inc. (COSRECI) — in UK
  - Church of Scientology Advanced organization Saint Hill Europe and Africa (AOSHEU) — in Denmark
  - Church of Scientology, Inc. — in Australia
- † Hubbard Association of Scientologists (HAS) — formed 1952 as a secular training facility, book publisher, and seller of e-meters

== Membership organizations ==
- International Association of Scientologists (IAS) — unincorporated religious membership association
- International Association of Scientologists Administrations, N.V. (IASA)
- Membership Services Administrations (UK) Ltd. (MSA)
- US IAS Members' Trust

== The term "Church of Scientology" ==
The "Church of Scientology" (frequently abbreviated as "the Church") is a term commonly used as an overarching label for the conglomerate of interrelated Scientology corporations. (Note: Quote by Hugh Urban: Today, what we call "Scientology" is in reality a remarkably complex network of ostensibly independent but clearly interconnected corporate entities. These include, among many others, the Watchdog Committee (WDC), the Commodore's Messenger Organization (CMO), Author Services Incorporated (ASI), Church of Scientology Religious Education College, Inc. (COSRECI), Bridge Publications, New Era Publications, the "Flag Ship Service Organization" (FSSO), the Advanced Organizations, the Saint Hills, and the many churches (also known as "outer orgs"). In addition, there are various other groups and programs, such as Scientology Missions International (SMI), the World Institute of Scientology Enterprises (WISE), the Association for Better Living and Education (ABLE), the Concerned Businessmen's Association, the Citizen's Commission on Human Rights (CCHR), and a wide variety of schools and educational programs. As such, Scientology is perhaps best understood not simply as "a religion" but rather as an extremely complex "multi-faceted transnational organization," of which religion is one - but only one - aspect.) According to the Church of Scientology International in a response to the IRS in 1991:

Technically, there is no single entity known as the "Church of Scientology", but for convenience, we sometimes refer to the Scientology international ecclesiastical hierarchy of churches — including ecclesiastical support and related social betterment organizations — as the "Church of Scientology" or the "Church".

Though there are many corporations with names beginning with "Church of Scientology", there is no corporate entity named "Church of Scientology". In the 1950s, there were two short-lived organizations by that name:

- The Church of Scientology was incorporated in New Jersey on December 22, 1953 along with The Church of American Science, and The Church of Spiritual Engineering on January 18, 1954. These three entities came under Hubbard Association of Scientologists International (HASI). All four entities have long been terminated.
- Church of Scientology was incorporated in California on February 18, 1954. Two years later it was officially renamed to Church of Scientology of California on June 19, 1956. That corporation was restated in August 1982, dissolved on December 30, 2002, and terminated with the California Secretary of State on November 18, 2004.

In a 1992 legal case between Scientology and the IRS, this list was compiled:

After the church was "simplified" [in the 1980s], the record suggests that at least the following organizations constitute the church of Scientology: Founding Church of Scientology; Church of Scientology International; Religious Technology Center [including the Authorization, Verification and Correction Unit]; Church of Spiritual Technology; 129 Missions of Scientology, governed by Scientology Missions International; Church of Scientology Celebrity Centre International; 141 Class IV churches [local organizations such as the Church of Scientology of Portland or the Church of Scientology of San Francisco]; Continental Liaison Offices [known as CLOs]; Saint Hill Organizations; Church of Scientology Flag Service Organization; Flag Land Base; Flag Estates Org; Flag Command Bureaux [including Compilations Unit, LRH Artist, International Training School, New World Corps, Strategic Book Marketing Unit]; International Hubbard Ecclesiastic League of Pastors [known as IHELP]; Sea Organization Officer Council; the American Saint Hill Organization; Advanced Organization Los Angeles; Golden Era Studios; Watchdog Committee; the Commodore's Messenger Organization International; the Executive Director International; the Senior Executive Strata; the International Network of Computer Organized Management; World Institute of Scientology Enterprises; Golden Era Productions; Office of Special Affairs International; Bridge Publications; LRH Public Relations International; Household Unit; Inspector General Network [comprising the Trademark Integrity Division and the Qualifications Division]; the United States Scientology Films Trust; International Scientology Films Trust; Author Services Inc., Cancorp, Religious Research Foundation; International Association of Scientologists; Church of Scientology Religious Trust.

— United States Claims Court

== Founding Church of Scientology, Washington, D.C. ==
The Founding Church of Scientology of Washington, D.C. (FCDC) was incorporated in 1955 under the name The Founding Church of Man's Religion of Washington, D.C., as a "parent church for the propagation of the religious faith known as Scientology". The name was often shortened to "Founding Church" or "Founding Church DC", and abbreviated FCDC. In the 1960s, FCDC had offices in Washington, D.C. at 1810, 1812, and 1827 19th Street NW, and 1907 and 2125 S Street NW. Its purpose was "To disseminate Scientology. To advance and protect its membership. To hold the lines and data of Scientology clean and clear. To educate and process people toward the goal of a civilized age on Earth second to none. To survive on all dynamics." Subsidiary organizations included the Distribution Center, Inc., the Academy of Scientology, and Hubbard Guidance Center.

FCDC was the site of a 1963 raid by US Marshals for the FDA in which all the e-meters on the premises, and related publications, were confiscated. The resulting lawsuits covered several years, and resulted in a 1970s order limiting the use of e-meters and mandating certain labeling.

FCDC was also the site of a 1977 raid by the FBI over Scientology's spying on government agencies. This resulted in the criminal conviction of eleven Scientologists in 1979, including L. Ron Hubbard's wife.

In 1994, the Church of Scientology purchased the Fraser Mansion at 1701 20th Street NW for their new "Founding Church of Scientology Washington D.C." In 2009, the new FCDC relocated to 1424 16th Street NW, while the Fraser Mansion was repurposed for Scientology's National Affairs Office.

In 2003, Heritage Properties International, a subordinate organization to Church of Spiritual Technology and formerly named Heritage Management Company Ltd., purchased the building at 1812 19th Street NW, and turned it into a Scientology museum named L. Ron Hubbard House. It is also referred to as the historic Founding Church of Scientology.

== See also ==
- Scientology front groups
- List of trademarks owned by the Church of Scientology and its affiliates
