= Bibliography of Scientology =

Books by Hubbard and Church of Scientology

This bibliography of Scientology includes Scientology and Dianetics-related books, periodicals and other issues authored by L. Ron Hubbard and those produced by the Church of Scientology and its related organizations. Books bearing L. Ron Hubbard's name are considered texts of Scientology's canon.

The amount of material on Dianetics and Scientology is extensive, to say the least. This material is composed of books by L. Ron Hubbard (including basic books on Dianetics and Scientology philosophy and technology, technical bulletins, a technical dictionary, and bulletins on Hubbard's management technology); compilations of his works; taped lectures; auditor training materials (books, tapes, films, and portfolios); course packages; booklets; a large number of magazines and annuals; and video recordings of the major annual events.

— Dorthe Refslund Christensen

After Hubbard's death in 1986, all publications bearing his name are copyrighted L. Ron Hubbard Library, (Note: Quote: [Mr. Hubbard's testamentary trust] has continued Mr. Hubbard's practice of copyrighting his works and licensing the rights to produce and distribute Scriptural material to Bridge, New Era or CSI, as appropriate. In order to continue using Mr. Hubbard's name in the copyright notices (copyright notices of posthumous works must be in the name of the decedent's executor or personal representative), the executor of his estate (and later the trustee of the Trust) registered and used the fictitious name "L. Ron Hubbard Library" as a legal form of operation. As a result, copyright notices on Mr. Hubbard's posthumously registered works read "L. Ron Hubbard Library" rather than the individual name of Mr. Hubbard's personal representative.) and books compiled by the Church of Scientology and published after his death are indicated as "Based on the Works of L. Ron Hubbard". (Note: Quote: There are also many books published by Scientology organisations as "based on the works of L. Ron Hubbard". These usually are selected and thematically linked passages from his original books.) (Note: Quote: [The books] list no author or editor. The covers all say "Based on the works of L. Ron Hubbard", and the copyright registration is held by the L. Ron Hubbard Library, the business alias of the Church of Scientology's corporate alter ego, the Church of Spiritual Technology. ... The decision to list no author or editor was made by Scientology's publisher, Bridge Publications, on the grounds that: "Mr. Hubbard was the author of the ideas and the technology of study... As they are Mr. Hubbard's ideas and methodologies, and his alone, Bridge Publications assigned the credit where it is incontrovertibly due, to L. Ron Hubbard, the originator." (Scott D. Welch, Senior Vice President of Bridge Publications, in a letter to the editor of Education Week, published October 10, 1997))

== Books ==
Advanced Procedure and Axioms (November 1951)
This is a Dianetics book which introduces such subjects as the Dianetic Axioms—all of the axioms on which the theory of Dianetics is structured; the Dianetic Logics, a system of thought and analysis based on infinite-valued logic and through which any situation may be evaluated. This book also introduces such concepts as "Self-Determinism", "Absolute Responsibility", and the "Service Facsimile"—a mechanism by which the individual seeks to make themselves right and others wrong by suffering from some inability, illness, etc. ISBN 9781403144140

All About Radiation (1957)
A book on the subject of radiation and atomic bombs, the effects on the human body, techniques for reducing or eradicating those effects, and controversial claims for curing radiation poisoning. Out of print. An early edition was titled All about radiation : man's inhumanity to man. Variously labelled over the years as being authored by L. Ron Hubbard; by "a nuclear physicist and a medical doctor" (c. 1967); by Hubbard, Gene Denk, and Farley R. Spink (1989); and other versions included a Richard Farley. ISBN 9780884044468

Art (1991)
Art was originally a technical bulletin on the theory of art, Hubbard's attempt at codification of an aesthetic theory. Hubbard's approach focuses on the overlap between communication and art. The three axioms of art that he proposed in the book was that first, "too much originality throws the audience into unfamiliarity and therefore disagreement". Second that "technique should not rise above the level of workability for the purpose of communication". Third, "perfection cannot be attained at the expense of communication". ISBN 9780884044833

Assists Processing Handbook

The Book of Case Remedies

The Book of E-Meter Drills (1965)
Earlier editions with credit to Mary Sue Hubbard. ISBN 9781573180320

Child Dianetics

Clear Body, Clear Mind (1990)
Also known as Purification and Clear Body, Clear Mind: The Effective Purification Program. Compiled from earlier Hubbard bulletins. The book suggests that harmful chemicals lodge in the fatty tissues of the body and affect the mind, then describes how these can be removed through a sauna and vitamin regimen. This book is a basic text for the Church of Scientology's Purification Rundown.

The Creation of Human Ability (July 1954)
This book contains all of the processes derived from previous data and the newly introduced objective processes—which deal in directly perceiving and affecting objective, present-time reality both with the person either interior or exterior to his body. Theologian Marco Frenschkowski comments that the book was created as a quick reference guide for auditors, was compiled by Hubbard's office, and starts with a bible quotation from the gospel of Luke, one of the longest biblical quotations in Hubbard's writings.

Dianetics: The Evolution of a Science
First published May 1950 as an article in Astounding Science Fiction, and republished later as a book, it contains the only account of how the optimum computing machine—the mind—works, how Hubbard discovered "basic personality", how the dynamic principle of existence—survive—was first isolated, how wrong answers enter into the mind, how there seem to be demons of the mind, how the concept of the engram was discovered, and how Dianetics techniques were developed.

Dianetics: The Modern Science of Mental Health
First published in May 1950 and referred to as "Book One" by Scientologists, this book describes Hubbard's ideas about the "reactive mind", the time track, and his therapy technique for getting rid of psychosomatic illness. Abbreviated as DMSMH.

Dianetics: The Original Thesis
First published in 1951 under the name Dianetics: The Original Thesis, and retitled in 1983 as The Dynamics of Life. According to the forward of the 2007 version of the book, the editors write that this book had originally been circulated in manuscript form to a few friends, copied and passed hand-to-hand, generating a large inflow of correspondence filled with questions, and prompting Hubbard to write Dianetics: The Modern Science to Mental Health.

Dianetics 55! (December 1954)
This book deals with a very large range of processes all centering around the subject of the individual's communications with his environment. It is the 1955 answer to Dianetics: The Modern Science of Mental Health.

E-Meter Essentials

Excalibur (1938)
Unpublished, but oft-mentioned by Hubbard.

Group Auditor's Handbook

Handbook For Preclears (December 1951)
This Dianetics book shares much of the theory of Advanced Procedure and Axioms and is dedicated to self-processing.

Have You Lived Before This Life? (1960)
First published in 1960, but no longer printed. A collection of forty-one case histories of past-life experiences, gleaned from auditing with an e-meter at the Church of Scientology's "Fifth London Advanced Clinical Course" held in October–November 1958. The book touches on "what happens after death and on the effects of past lives on the present existence".

How to Live though an Executive (1953)

Hymn of Asia: An Eastern Poem (1974)
Hubbard speculates whether he might be Maitreya, the future Buddha spoken of in Buddhist literature.

Introducing the E-Meter

Introduction to Scientology Ethics (1968)
Written by Hubbard. (See also Scientology ethics and justice.)

Introductory and Demonstration Processes Handbook

Knowingness

L. Ron Hubbard Series
16 books covering Hubbard's hagiography.

Mission Into Time (1973)
Relates Hubbard's travels in the Mediterranean in 1968 to check his "recall" of incidents occurring several thousand years ago. The book is edited from a lecture and formerly published as A Test of Whole Track Recall. "It is a report on missions sent out to Sardinia, Sicily and Carthage to see if specific evidence could be found to substantiate L. Ron Hubbard's recall of incidents in his own past, centuries ago."

Notes on the Lectures of L. Ron Hubbard

The Organization Executive Course and Management Series
The OEC is a 12-volume series of books bound in green and holding all the administrative issues and HCO Policy letters written by Hubbard. Volumes 1–7 correspond with the seven divisions of a Scientology organization. Volume 0 is called "Basic Hat" and contains the issues any general Scientology staff member would need to read. The three "management series" volumes contain series by specific topic such as personnel, finances, and marketing. A separate index volume contains an extensive subject index of all the issues in the series, as well as lists sorted alphabetically by title and chronologically by date of issue.

The Problems of Work (1956)

Purification: An Illustrated Answer to Drugs

Research and Discovery Series

Science of Survival (June 1951)
In this book, Hubbard introduced concepts that were later to become key elements of Scientology: theta, the tone scale, and the possibility of past lives. It contains a description of how a thetan interacts with the physical universe of matter, energy, space and time—termed MEST. The book is written around a Chart of Human Evaluation, providing a comprehensive description of the tone scale and the components of emotion, such as the ARC triangle of affinity, reality and communication.

Scientology: A History of Man (July 1952)
Also known as History of Man and by its original title What to Audit, in this book Hubbard gives general case data and rudimentary instructions on how to audit the "Whole Track" (all of the lifetimes lived by the individual, known as the thetan) and certain common incidents found in all genetic entities (the theta entity apart from the individual himself, which has been found to play a key role in the evolution and development of the body). Among the genetic entity case stories are some of single-celled organisms, clams, sloths and neanderthals. On the thetan's whole track are incidents loosely called "space opera," including "implants," which are strong engrams deliberately inflicted on the victim for political purposes.
One of Hubbard's first documented writings on the process of "theta clearing" was in the book, where Hubbard states, "Theta clearing is about as practical and simple as repairing a shoelace. It has nothing to do with hypnotism, voodooism, charlatanism, monkeyism or eosophy. Done, the thetan can do anything a stage magician can do in the way of moving objects around."

Scientology: A New Slant on Life (1976)
Compiled from works by Hubbard, it contains such Scientology articles as "Is It Possible to Be Happy?", "Two Rules for Happy Living", "Personal Integrity", and "'The Anti-Social Personality." "A New Slant On Life is a highly practical handbook for the reader seeking to understand himself or herself, and discover his or her own answers."

Scientology: The Fundamentals of Thought (1956)
This book contains all basic Dianetics and Scientology principles and processes developed to the individual and their life as a game. A basic concept in the book is that life is a game no matter what, and that the basic variable is the degree to which the individual knows what games they are playing and the degree to which they can knowingly come up with new ones.

The Scientology Handbook (1994)
The Scientology Handbook is an 871-page book published as "based on the works of L. Ron Hubbard". It was previously titled The Volunteer Minister's Handbook, and includes introductions to some of the basic practices of Scientology such as Hubbard's Study Technology, the emotional tone scale, "assists", suppression, marriage, ethics, and public relations.

Scientology 0–8: The Book of Basics

Scientology 8-80 (November 1952)
This book contains the basic laws by which the thetan is able to create energy and therefore influence the environment around him. It also therefore includes newly developed processing related to energy production and stuck or uncontrolled energy over which the thetan is not taking responsibility.

Scientology 8-8008 (December 1952)
This is one of the most important books in Scientology. The number 8-8008 is a symbolism for the reduction of the MEST universe to zero and expansion of one's own universe to infinity. This book deals in the subject of postulates, considerations and the way in which the individual perceives and therefore creates the physical universe and also his own universe. Processing here deals with the complete rehabilitation of one's own universe so that one can cause an effect on the shared physical universe.

Self Analysis (August 1951)
Included in this book are the laws of survival and abundance, the most embracive description of consciousness, humanity's efforts for immortality and its relationship to matter, energy, space and time, Essays describing a broad array of discoveries including time, remembering, forgetting, imagination, valences and special auditing lists for each. This book also includes self-processing lists that provide the most powerful of auditing and which can be done anywhere and at any time.

The Technical Bulletins of Dianetics and Scientology (18 volumes)

Understanding: The Universal Solvent

Understanding the E-Meter

The Way to Happiness (1981)
Usually printed as a pamphlet or small booklet, this book is marketed as a non-religious text covering 21 moral principles.

== Periodicals ==
These are some of the periodical magazines that the Church of Scientology has published.

- Ability — Magazine of Class V orgs. Class V orgs deliver Scientology services up to the level of Clear.
- Advance! — Magazine of Advanced Organizations including Advanced Org Los Angeles (AOLA) and others. AOs deliver the OT Levels to Scientologists.
- Auditor — Magazine of "Saint Hill" sized orgs including American Saint Hill Organization (ASHO) and AOSHUK. Saint Hill orgs deliver the Saint Hill Special Briefing Course to students.
- Cause — Magazine of International Hubbard Ecclesiastical League of Pastors (IHELP). IHELP licenses individual Scientologists to audit others outside of the Church of Scientology.
- Celebrity — Magazine of Celebrity Centres
- Centre — Magazine of Scientology Missions International
- Certainty — Magazine for the British Isles
- Freedom — Magazine published by Church of Scientology International for general distribution to any public person (non-scientologists). The tagline is "Investigative reporting in the public interest". The original tagline was "The Independent Journal Published by the Church of Scientology". Characterized as propaganda.
- High Winds — Quarterly magazine of the Sea Org
- Impact — Magazine of the International Association of Scientologists
- Inroads — Magazine of the Association for Better Living and Education
- International Scientology News — Magazine published by Church of Scientology International for distribution to Scientologists.
- Reality — Magazine of the Church of Scientology of Los Angeles
- Source — Magazine of the Flag Land Base including Church of Scientology Flag Service Organization and Flag's Advanced Org.
- Theta — Magazine of the Church of Scientology of New York
- Prosperity — Magazine of World Institute of Scientology Enterprises (WISE). The tagline is "The Source Line for Business".
- Winning! — News journal of the Office of Special Affairs

== Other issues ==
- Hubbard Communications Office Bulletin (HCOB)^{†} - Authored by Hubbard. Used to communicate procedures for auditing or training activities (the "tech"). Printed with red ink on white paper.
- Hubbard Communications Office Policy Letter (HCOPL)^{†} - Authored by Hubbard. Used to communicate orders, directions or policy for Scientology administrative and management purposes. Printed with green ink on white paper. Also abbreviated HCO PL or HCO Pol Ltr.

^{†} Note: "Hubbard Communications Office" (HCO) is a division within Scientology organizations. L. Ron Hubbard issued his bulletins and policy letters under the HCO imprint, which served as the standard header for these materials.

- Flag Order (FO) - Policy for the Sea Org. Authored by Hubbard or senior Sea Org executives.
- L. Ron Hubbard Executive Directive (LRH ED) - Previously called SEC EDs. Authored by Hubbard. For projects, programs, orders and directions. Printed with blue ink on white paper.
- Scientology Policy Directive (SPD) - Printed with green ink on green paper. Issued by the Church of Scientology, not by Hubbard.

== Publications by Church of Scientology on non‑Scientology topics ==
Brain-Washing Manual (1955)
The long title is Brain-Washing: A Synthesis of the Russian Textbook on Psychopolitics. It is a propaganda book about brainwashing, published by the Church of Scientology in 1955 without listing an author, while alleging it was a secret manual written by the Soviet secret police chief in 1936. Alleged by Hubbard's son to have been dictated by L. Ron Hubbard.

The Handbook on How to Use the Freedom of Information Act (1989)
46-page booklet.

== See also ==
- Scientology filmography
- L. Ron Hubbard bibliography
- Bibliography of books critical of Scientology
