= Church of Spiritual Technology =

Scientology organization

- Logo of the Church of Spiritual Technology
- Abbreviation: CST
- Formation: 1982
- Type: Nonprofit
- Purpose: Owns the copyrights to the works of L. Ron Hubbard and licenses their use
- Headquarters: 25406 State Highway 189, Twin Peaks, California 92391
- Coordinates: 34.229853°N 117.25°W
- Product: Preservation and archiving of L. Ron Hubbard's writings and lectures.
- Chairman of Religious Technology Center: David Miscavige
- President: Russell Bellin
- Secretary: Jeanne Reynolds
- Treasurer: Arthur Bolstad
- Remarks: Assets: US$ 447 million (2012)

The Church of Spiritual Technology (CST) is a California 501(c)(3) non-profit corporation, incorporated in 1982, which owns all the copyrights of the estate of L. Ron Hubbard and licenses their use. CST does business as L. Ron Hubbard Library. The Church of Spiritual Technology points to Hubbard as the “focal point,” with the structure designed to realize what Scientologists understand to be his vision. The stated purpose of the archive in CST, according to the church is “so that future generations will have available to them all of L. Ron Hubbard’s technology in its exact and original form, no matter what happens to the society.”

== Corporate information ==
The Church of Spiritual Technology (CST) was incorporated by Sherman Lenske in Woodland Hills, California, on May 27, 1982. The Bylaws of CST were signed on June 7, 1982, by its General and Special Directors, who were at that time Lyman Spurlock, Rebecca Pook, Maria Starkey, Stephen A. Lenske, Sherman D. Lenske and Lawrence A. Heller. In 1986, CST's Articles of Incorporation were amended to clarify the "disposition of the corporation's assets upon dissolution". On August 18, 1993, CST filed an application for tax exemption under section 501(c)(3) of the Internal Revenue Code. The Internal Revenue Service granted CST's request for exemption through an official recognition letter on October 1, 1993.

At the time of the filing for tax exemption, the following individuals held corporate positions at CST: The Board of Trustees was composed of John Allcock, David Lantz and Russell Bellin. Thomas Vorm, Russell Bellin and Catherine Schmidt formed the Board of Directors. CST's President was Russell Bellin, its Vice-President Thomas Vorm, its Secretary Jane McNairn and its Treasurer Catherine Schmidt.

In autumn 2021, CST was designated as an "undesirable organization" in Russia.

=== Licensing of trademarks and service marks ===
July 8, 1988 IRS, final adverse ruling letter with regards to application for tax exempt status of Church of Spiritual Technology

The existence and founding of CST is intimately connected to the creation of the Religious Technology Center (RTC), which was incorporated on January 1, 1982. Shortly after its inception, RTC received on May 16, 1982 "the ownership, supervision and control" of the trademarks and service marks, identifying "Scientology applied religious philosophy" and "Dianetics spiritual healing technology" by the originator and founder of Scientology, L. Ron Hubbard through a so-called "Assignment Agreement".

This agreement was subject to an additional "Option Agreement" between Hubbard, RTC and CST. In two so-called "Option Agreements" from May 1982, Hubbard granted CST the right to purchase at any time from RTC the "Marks", the "Advanced Technology" and all the rights to them for the sum of $100.

Parallel and similar-sounding agreements between Hubbard, RTC and CST were created during that period concerning the so-called "Advanced Technology," which consists of unpublished derivatives of Scientology's confidential "Advanced technology".

Under these agreements, RTC is forced to turn over 90% of its net income to CST. A document from 1991, reflecting the "financial money flows" of RTC during the year 1989, actually showed a turnover of 59% of RTC's net income towards CST.

=== L. Ron Hubbard Library ===
After being awarded tax-exempt status, CST received Hubbard's copyrights and patents from Mr. Hubbard's Trust. Hubbard's books that are published posthumously are copyrighted by CST under the fictitious business name "L. Ron Hubbard Library".

== Archival project ==
The CST oversees the Scientology scriptural archiving project, which aims to preserve the works of Hubbard on stainless steel tablets and encased in titanium capsules in specially constructed vaults throughout the world. Copies of Hubbard's works go through a rigorous process, beginning with the removal of deterioration-causing acid from the paper, and then being placed in plastic envelopes. They are then placed in the titanium "time capsules." The writings are also carved into stainless steel plates, which, according to Church of Scientology officials, can withstand being sprayed with salt water for a thousand years. Hubbard's taped lectures are recorded again into gold compact discs encased in glass.

The Church places prime value to Hubbard's volumes of works and because of this has instituted the CST to “engrave the entire corpus of Hubbard’s original texts on steel plates.” The most famous example is the Trementina Base, an underground vault built into a mountainside near Trementina, New Mexico. It is marked by a CST logo visible only from a high altitude and was built in the late 1980s. Former members claim that the purpose of CST's archival efforts is to ensure that Hubbard's work survive a nuclear apocalypse and reform civilization. The church believes that these plates will last beyond a thousand years and that Hubbard's teachings will be vital for "rebuilding civilization," in the event of global turmoil. Former members of the church also claim that the symbols in the logo are "guide markers for Scientologists returning from other parts of the universe", according to Scientology in Popular Culture: Influences and Struggles for Legitimacy.

According to the Scientology website, the Church of Spiritual Technology “is not involved in the ecclesiastical management of Scientology churches or the delivery of Scientology religious services. Its day-to-day activities are the long-term archival preservation methods to ensure that Mr. Hubbard’s written recorded works will be preserved for future generations.” The website also states that the archive's purpose is to make available L. Ron Hubbard's technology “in its exact and original form, no matter what happens to the society.”

Additional archive sites exist in Tuolumne, California and Petrolia, California.

== Facility locations ==
CST operates numerous bases throughout the western United States. Locations include:

=== Twin Peaks, California ===
Located at 25406 California Highway 189, Twin Peaks, California, this location is one of the more secretive within the Church.

=== Creston, California (Creston Ranch / Whispering Winds Ranch) ===
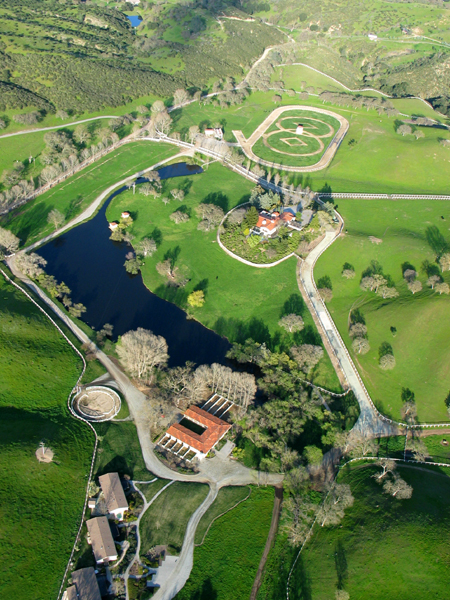
Creston Ranch. Note CST logo top center)

While not a vault location, the Creston Ranch, where L. Ron Hubbard spent his last days, is marked with the CST logo. It is located at 4675 Coyote Creek Lane, Creston, California, with coordinates 35°27′13″N 120°30′0″W

=== Petrolia, California (Sunset View / Eureka) ===
The property is used as an archival document storage repository, which will store religious documents preserved by CST.

=== Tuolumne, California (Lady Washington Mine) ===
Located at 18749 First Avenue, Tuolumne serves as archival storage for the writings of L. Ron Hubbard. The Lady Washington Mine and two houses on 26.23 acres were purchased in 1988 by William and Donna Daniels. In 1988, the Daniels gave the property to Norman Starkey, trustee of "Author's Family Trust". Starkey gave the property to the Church of Spiritual Technology in 1993. Digging began in 1997. According to the Los Angeles Times, the CST "is using state-of-the-art technology to protect Hubbard's writings, tape-recorded lectures and filmed treatises from natural and man-made calamities, including nuclear holocaust."

According to plans filed with the Tuolumne County Building Department the facility features a 15-foot-wide, 250-foot-long tunnel. The first 98 feet from the entrance are improved, with a 10.5-foot domed ceiling. At the end of the 98 feet is a 10-foot-long storage room.

=== Trementina, New Mexico (San Miguel Ranch / Trementina Base) ===
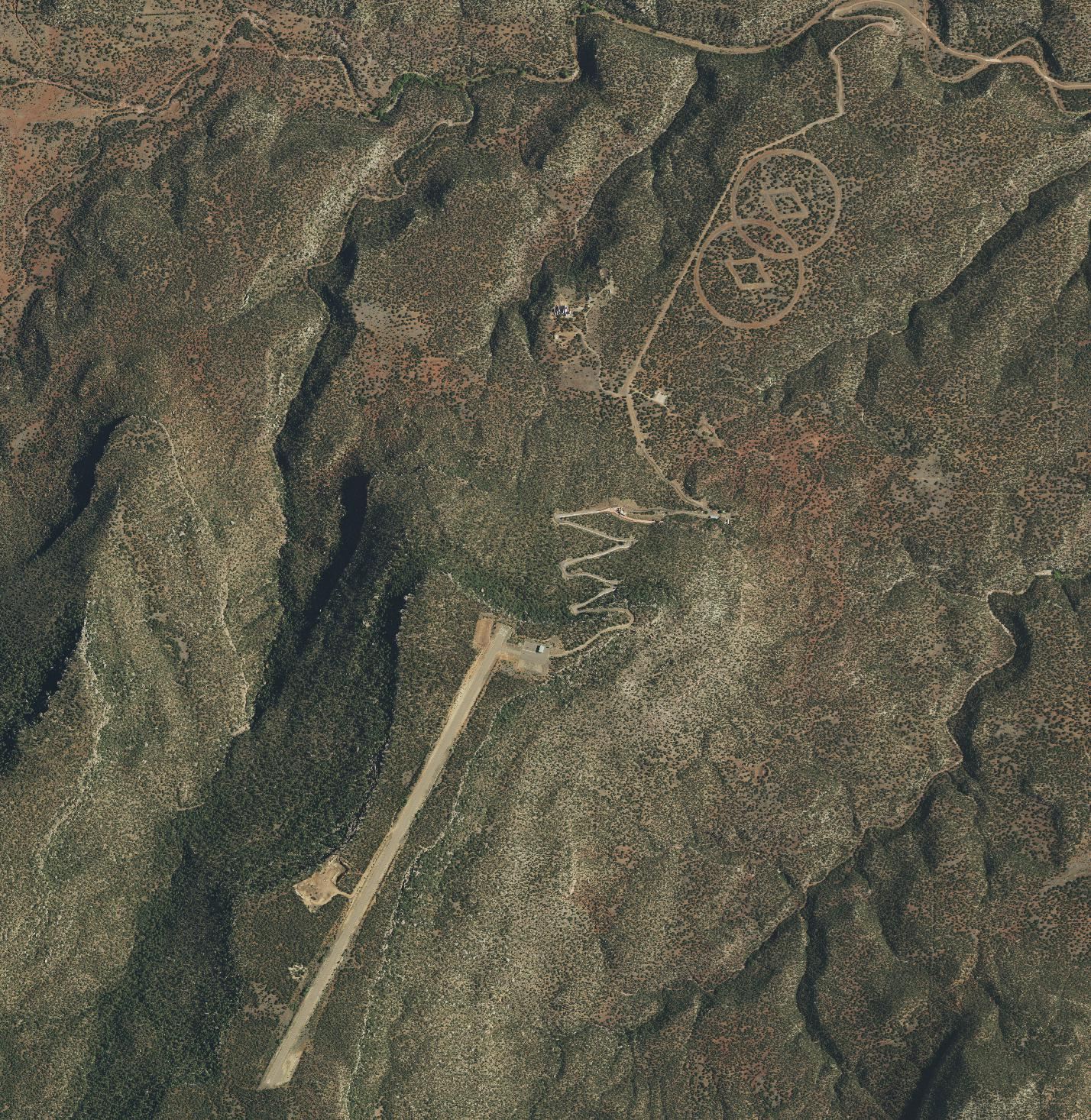
Trementina Base runway and CST Logo

According to CST, the purpose of this base is to provide storage space for an archiving project to preserve Scientology founder L. Ron Hubbard's writings, films and recordings for future generations. Hubbard's texts have been engraved on stainless steel tablets and encased in titanium capsules underground. The project began in the late 1980s.

The base includes a number of dwellings and the archives themselves, the latter in a network of tunnels. The base also has its own private, concrete airstrip, the San Miguel Ranch Airport (NM53).

The site is about a 2 1/2-hour drive east of Santa Fe. Access is through a gated road and a private concrete airstrip, the San Miguel Ranch Airport (NM53). The Trementina location is supposedly a store for material written by L.R. Hubbard, as shown in 1998 on ABC News 20/20:

Buried deep in these New Mexico hills in steel-lined tunnels, said to be able to survive a nuclear blast, is what Scientology considers the future of mankind," ABC's Tom Jarriel said in his report. "Seen here for the first time, thousands of metal records, stored in heat-resistant titanium boxes and playable on a solar-powered turntable, all containing the beliefs of Scientology's founder, L. Ron Hubbard.

The site is marked from the air with Church of Spiritual Technology double diamonds. A runway for smaller airplanes is located on CST owned land in connection to the site. The original short strip was expanded in the early 1990s on land acquired by a land swap deal between CST and neighboring land owners in 1992.

== Structure ==
The first time the Church of Spiritual Technology was mentioned publicly to Scientologists was by David Miscavige in 2000 at the New Year's event. Its founders included Meade Emory, a non-Scientologist who used to work for the Internal Revenue Service (IRS) but went into private practice as a tax lawyer. He was hired as a specialist for the complex Internal Revenue Codes. The Church of Scientology International and most Scientology organizations settled with the IRS about 11 years later when the service passed a resolution in 1993 declaring the Church tax-exempt.

Other Scientology organizations require all corporate officers to be Scientologists in good standing, along with Scientologist general directors and staff. The CST, however, includes "Special Directors" who are not required to be Scientologists, but who are required to be lawyers "to ensure that CST takes no action to jeopardize its tax-exempt status".

== See also ==
- List of Scientology organizations
- Scientology officials
