= Scientology in Germany =

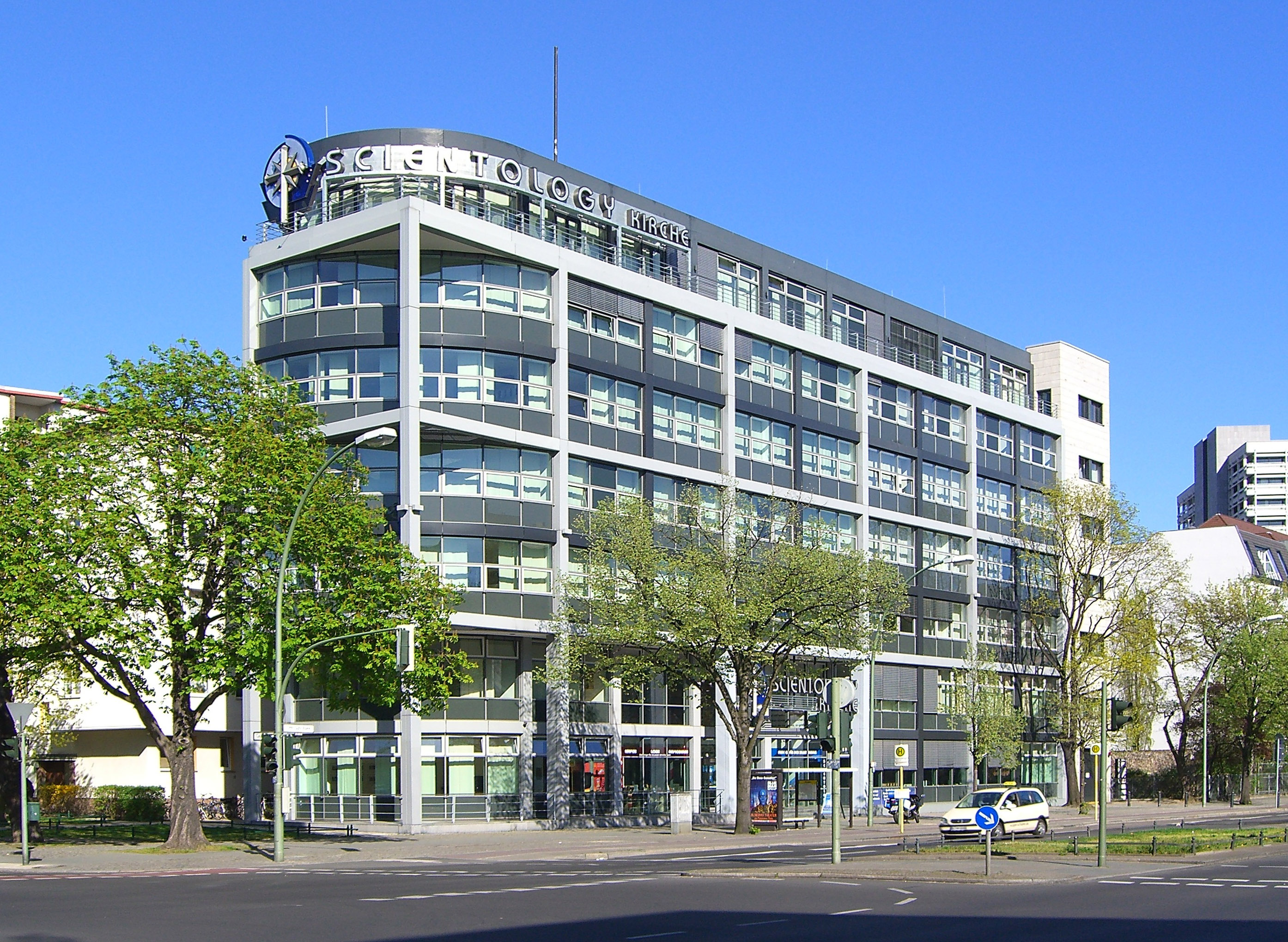
The Scientology headquarters in Berlin

The Church of Scientology has operated in Germany since 1970. German authorities estimate that there are 3,500 active Scientologists in Germany as of 2019, while the Church of Scientology itself gives a membership figure of around 12,000. The Church of Scientology has encountered particular antagonism from the German press and government and occupies a precarious legal, social, and cultural position in Germany.

As of 2017, German courts have so far not resolved whether to accord Scientology the legal status of a religious or worldview community, and different courts have reached contradictory conclusions. The German domestic intelligence service is constantly monitoring the organization and mentions them in their annual review about anti-constitutional activities. The German government does not recognize Scientology as a religion; rather, it views it as an abusive business masquerading as a religion and believes that it pursues political goals that conflict with the values enshrined in the German constitution. This stance has been criticized by the U.S. government.

Scientologists in Germany do not enjoy tax benefits or protection as do formally recognized religions. They are, like other sects not granted status of a religion, barred from membership in some major political parties, and businesses and employers can use so-called "sect filters" to discover a prospective business partner's or employee's association with the organization. Unlike a formally accepted religious belief there is no protection from others selecting to not do business or accept membership based on an applicant being in Scientology, or other groups that are under surveillance by the domestic intelligence service. German federal and state interior ministers started a process aimed at banning Scientology in late 2007, but abandoned the initiative a year later, finding insufficient legal grounds. As of 2017, polls suggest that half of Germans supported banning Scientology, while over two-thirds considered Scientology dangerous.

== Background ==
Scientology, founded in the early 1950s in the United States by L. Ron Hubbard and today claiming to be represented in 150 countries, has been a very controversial new religious movement. Its stated utopian aim is to "clear the planet," to bring about an enlightened age in which every individual has overcome their psychological limitations. Scientology teaches that the source of people's unhappiness lies in "engrams," psychological burdens acquired in the course of painful experiences, which can be cleared through a type of counselling called "auditing" made available by the Church of Scientology.

That Scientologists have to pay large fees for auditing and other Scientology services has brought controversy to Scientology throughout much of its history, with governments classing it as a profit-making enterprise rather than as a religion. Critics maintain that Scientology is "a business-driven, psychologically manipulative, totalitarian ideology with world-dominating aspirations," and that it tricks its members into parting with significant sums of money for Scientology courses. Scientology has fought innumerable lawsuits to defend itself against such charges and to pursue legal recognition as a religion. These efforts have been partly successful – Scientology has gained recognition as a tax-exempt religious group in a number of countries, most notably in Australia in 1983 and the United States in 1993, and in 2007 won an important case at the European Court of Human Rights, which censured Russia for failing to register Scientology as a religion.

The German government has said that it does not consider Scientology a religion, but a "commercial enterprise with a history of taking advantage of vulnerable individuals and an extreme dislike of any criticism" whose "totalitarian structure and methods may pose a risk to Germany's democratic society." Accordingly, the German government has taken a very strong stance against the organization. Germany is not alone in opposing Scientology; in France, the "Church" of Scientology was convicted of organized fraud in October 2009, after a court found that members had been manipulated into paying large sums for Scientology products, and the "Church" only narrowly escaped being banned altogether. Scientology is similarly controversial in Belgium, Greece, and the UK.

On the subject of Scientology's status as a religion, the German government has pointed to a 1995 decision by the Federal Labor Court of Germany. That court, noting Hubbard's instruction that Scientologists should "make money, make more money – make other people produce so as to make more money," came to the conclusion that "Scientology purports to be a 'church' merely as a cover to pursue its economic interests." In the same decision, the court also found that Scientology uses "inhuman and totalitarian practices." Given the lessons of Germany's 20th-century history, in which the country came to be dominated by a fascist movement that started from similarly small beginnings, Germany is very wary of any ideological movement that might appear to be seeking a position of absolute power. References in Scientology writings to the elimination of "parasites" and "antisocial" people who stand in the way of progress towards Scientology's utopian world "without insanity, without criminals, and without war" evoke uncomfortable parallels with Nazism, and have led to Scientology being classified as an "extremist political movement."

To further justify its stance, the German government has also pointed to the long history of U.S. court cases involving Scientology, including the conviction of 11 top Scientologists in 1979 and 1980 for a conspiracy involving the infiltration of U.S. government agencies, wiretapping and the theft of government documents, a 1994 U.S. Supreme Court finding that Scientology practices took place in a "coercive environment," and Scientology's track record of pursuing its critics through malicious court cases and private investigators. In examining the potential threat posed by Scientology the German government has noted that Scientology organizations are "structured so as to make the individual psychologically and financially dependent on a Scientology system," and that members often abandon contact with friends and family.

== History ==
=== Scientology's presence in Germany ===
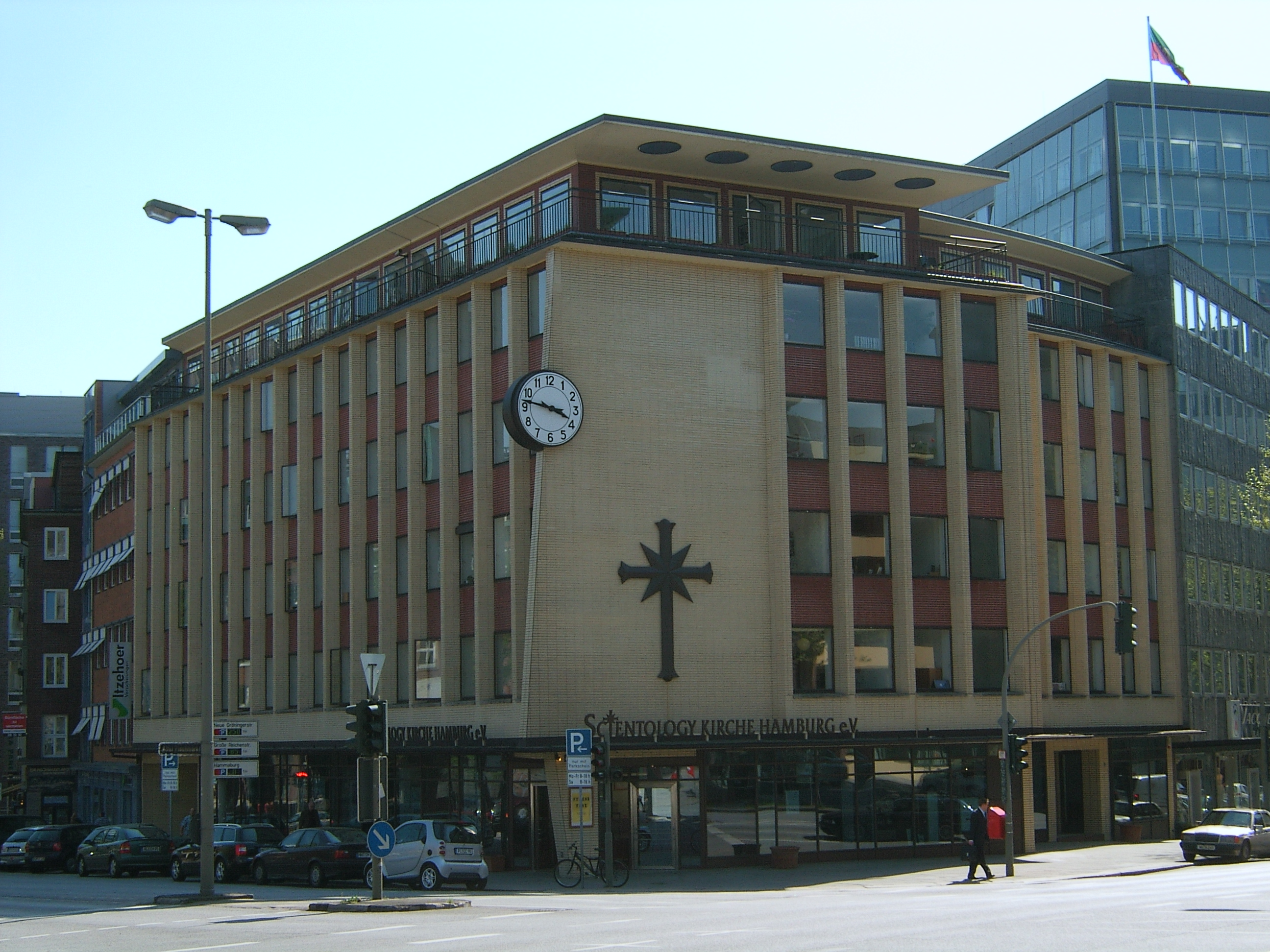
The Scientology Church in Hamburg

Scientology first became active in Germany in 1970. By 2007, there were ten major centres ("Scientology Churches"), as well as fourteen minor centres ("Scientology Missions") in Germany. The German Scientology Churches are located in the big cities – Munich, Hamburg, Berlin, Düsseldorf, Frankfurt am Main, Hannover, and Stuttgart. Of the Scientology Missions, nine are in Baden-Württemberg, and three in Bavaria. Following German re-unification, Scientology proved unable to gain significant numbers of followers in the territories of the former German Democratic Republic; most adherents are found in Baden-Württemberg, Bavaria, and North Rhine-Westphalia.

Scientology is represented by a large number of independent associations or Vereine in Germany; their umbrella organisation is the Scientology Kirche Deutschland e.V. Germany's domestic intelligence service, the Bundesamt für Verfassungsschutz (BfV, or Federal Office for the Protection of the Constitution), estimates that there are 3,500 Scientologists in Germany, down from earlier estimates of 5,000 to 6,000. The Church of Scientology reported around 30,000 members from the mid-1990s onwards; this number remained stable for many years. However more recently Scientology has said it has only 12,000 members. Discrepancies in Scientology membership numbers arise because the Church of Scientology applies more inclusive criteria in establishing its figures, essentially including anyone who has purchased a book or participated in courses, regardless of their subsequent involvement. The number of contractually bound Scientology staff members working in German Scientology organizations is unlikely to exceed a few hundred.

Scientology formulated a "Clear Germany" strategy in 1994 – similar to equivalent strategies pursued by Scientology in other countries and regions of the world – with the long-term aim of transforming German society in line with the Scientological ideal: a non-pluralist society in which Scientology enjoys overriding influence. The programme sought to address Scientology's image problems in Germany, to identify weak points in Germany that could be exploited for political gain, such as Germany's National Socialist history, and to increase both membership figures and political influence in German society, with a special emphasis on manoeuvring Scientologists into key positions in industry and government. As most religions seek to widen their influence in society, such a programme could of course also be defended as a missionary effort, much like those many religions engage in. However, according to the BfV, the strategy has not had any significant success. By 1998, 90 government officials had been suspected of being Scientologists and in 48 cases the suspicions were confirmed, but apart from some isolated cases, most of the officials concerned had not used their positions to advertise Scientology. According to Fifka & Sydora (2009), it is unknown to what degree the "Clear Germany" programme is still being pursued.

=== Public opposition ===
German public discourse does not regard Scientology as a religion, but generally characterizes it as a Sekte (cult or sect), or as an exploitative profit-making venture preying on vulnerable minds. Public concerns about the potential dangers posed by cults date back to the early 1970s, when widespread debate took place about "youth religions" such as the Unification Church, ISKCON, Children of God, and the Divine Light Mission. The most prominent critics of these new religious movements were the "sect commissioners" (Sektenbeauftragte) of Germany's Protestant Churches, who also actively promoted the establishment of private "initiatives of parents and concerned persons". Aktion Bildungsinformation ("Educational Information Campaign") became an important organization dedicated to opposing Scientology; taking an activist stance, it warned people not to get involved with Scientology, filed successful lawsuits against the Church of Scientology over its proselytizing in public places, and published an influential book, The Sect of Scientology and its Front Organizations. In 1981, the organization's founder, Ingo Heinemann, became the director of Aktion für geistige und psychische Freiheit ("Campaign for Intellectual and Psychic Freedom"), Germany's most prominent anti-cult organization. Warnings from sect experts about the influence of new religious movements gained media attention which put political pressure on the government to deal with the situation; as the movements were not doing anything illegal, the government resorted to issuing a range of leaflets and public statements giving general warnings about religious sects, the earliest of these publications appearing in 1979.

Fueled by events such as the Waco Siege in 1993, the murders and suicides associated with the Order of the Solar Temple, and the 1995 Aum Shinrikyo incidents in Japan, German fears and concerns about new religious movements gained in intensity in the 1990s, with Scientology attracting particular attention. Perceptions that Scientology had a totalitarian character were reinforced when Robert Vaughn Young, an American ex-Scientologist and former public relations official for the Church of Scientology, visited German officials in late 1995 and wrote an article in Der Spiegel, a widely read weekly magazine, describing Scientology as a totalitarian system operating a gulag – the Rehabilitation Project Force – for members of Scientology's Sea Org found guilty of transgressions. From the mid-1990s onward, press articles, reports and essays on Scientology appeared on an almost daily basis, accompanied by books and television programmes that reached a mass audience.

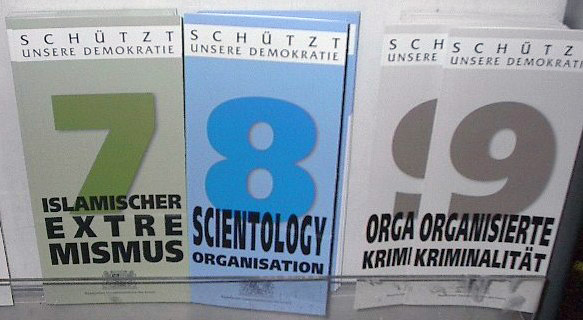
Information leaflets on Islamic extremism, Scientology and organized crime, published by the Bavarian Office for the Protection of the Constitution

As noted by the religious scholar Hubert Seiwert, Scientology came to be seen as a "serious political danger that not only threatened to turn individuals into will-less zombies, but was also conspiring to overthrow the democratic constitution of the state". This view of Scientology as a public enemy, Seiwert adds, "became a matter of political correctness": senior political figures became involved in launching campaigns against Scientology, and being suspected of any association with it resulted in social ostracism. Stephen A. Kent, writing in 1998, noted that officials at all levels of German government shared the insistence that Scientology should be suppressed. Scientology was viewed as "a totalitarian, business-driven organization [...] guilty of significant human rights abuses." Officials examining primary and secondary sources, legal documents, and the testimony of former members, concluded that the organization was "antithetical to a democratic state". Federal ministries and state governments were asked to use all legal means at their disposal to check the activities of Scientology.

Government publications on the dangers of sects increased between 1996 and 1998, and a significant number of them dealt with the "Church" of Scientology. The German courts had approved such publications in 1989, seeing them as part of the government's responsibility to keep the public informed, and finding that they did not interfere with religious freedom. In 1996, the German parliament launched an Enquete (Enquiry) Commission to investigate sects and similar groups, in large part because of public concerns about Scientology. Its final report, published in June 1998, concluded that Scientology, alone among new religious movements, required monitoring by Germany's domestic intelligence services.

An area of widespread concern in the German media has been the alleged "infiltration" of businesses by Scientologists, in line with Scientology's declared aim to penetrate society, politics and business in preparation for world domination. Attempts to infiltrate businesses have reportedly been most successful among small and medium-size companies, such as estate agents, management consultants and management-training companies. Management-consultancy firms led by Scientologists often conceal their association with Scientology; once they have recruited members of their clients' upper management, these managers may send employees to Scientology trainers, as part of company education and training programmes, without informing them as to the origin of the training methods used. An expensive commercial version of Scientology's Oxford Capacity Analysis, usually offered free as part of Scientology proselytizing in public places, temporarily entered some major German companies (who were unaware of its provenance) via such a management-consultancy firm.

In the mid-2000s, German sect experts expressed concerns that Scientologists were becoming active in the German after-school tutoring market. These concerns arose because customers of around 20 after-school tutoring centres operated by Scientologists in Frankfurt, Hamburg, Stuttgart and elsewhere might be unaware that their children were being taught by Scientologists, using Scientology methods. Brochures advertising the tutoring services would at most mention the name of L. Ron Hubbard, the founder of Scientology, but not Scientology itself.

In early 2008, Thomas Gandow, Sect Commissioner of the German Lutheran Church in Berlin and Brandenburg, and the historian Guido Knopp both likened the Scientologist Hollywood actor Tom Cruise to Goebbels, the Nazi propaganda minister. Gandow and Knopp cited a leaked Scientology video in which Cruise was seen asking the audience whether Scientologists should "clean up" the world, the audience responding with enthusiastic cheers – cheers which Gandow and Knopp felt were reminiscent of the audience's response to Goebbels' famous question, "Do you want total war?" Gandow's and Knopp's comments found few critics in Germany. Most Germans consider Scientology a subversive organization. In 1997, Time reported that 70% of Germans favoured banning Scientology; a poll conducted in September 2008 by Der Spiegel found 67% support for a ban.

German scholars such as Brigitte Schön and Gerald Willms have commented that rhetoric dominates public discourse around Scientology in Germany: in their view, efforts to "frame" information in such a way as to shape opinion have long been more important than the underlying realities. In Schön's words, this includes both the "efforts of German politicians to enhance their popularity with strong-worded statements" and "Scientology's efforts to present itself as the victim of unjust persecution"; commenting on foreign reporting on Scientology in Germany, she adds that "the American press may prefer sensationalist news to boring investigation and may frame the issue according to American stereotypes". Both Willms and Schön assert that the situation is compounded by the general paucity of scientific studies of Scientology. Schön as well as Irving Hexham, Professor of Religious Studies at the University of Calgary in Canada, have remarked in particular on the lack of academic studies by German scholars. Hexham attributes this situation to the strong influence of the Christian churches in Germany, which has made German academics wary of approaching the subject, because they fear repercussions for their research funding and for their prospects of future employment if they involve themselves in the debate.

In 2010, a German public broadcaster, ARD, showed the film Until Nothing Remains, a dramatized account of the effect Scientology had on one German family. Said to be based on a true story, the film attracted widespread media attention and a viewership of 8.69 million.

== Legal status ==
While there have been calls for Scientology to be banned, the "Church" of Scientology remains legal in Germany and is allowed to operate there. Its precise legal status however is unresolved. Two points are contested: first, whether or not the teachings of Scientology qualify as a "religion or worldview" (Religion or Weltanschauung; these are equal before German law), and secondly, whether or not these teachings are only used as a pretext for purely commercial activity; if the latter were the case, this would most likely imply that Scientology would not qualify for protection as a "religious or worldview community" (Religions- oder Weltanschauungsgemeinschaft) under Article 4 of the German constitution, which guarantees the freedom of belief, religion and worldview. Status as a "religious or worldview community" also affects a broad range of other issues in Germany, such as taxation and freedom of association.

The Federal Court of Justice of Germany has not yet made an explicit decision on the matter, but implicitly assumed in 1980 that Scientology represented a religious or worldview community. The Upper Administrative Court in Hamburg explicitly asserted in 1994 that Scientology should be viewed as a worldview community. In 1995, the Federal Labor Court of Germany decided that the Church of Scientology merely pursued commercial aims and did not represent a religious or worldview community entitled to protection under Article 4 of the German Constitution, although another decision by the same court left the question open again in 2003. In another 2003 decision, the Administrative Court of Baden-Württemberg in Mannheim said there were no indications that the teachings of Scientology merely served as a pretext for commercial activity. In 2005, the Federal Administrative Court of Germany explicitly granted a Scientologist protection under Article 4.1 of the German Constitution, which declares the freedom of religion and worldview inviolate.

Many courts have declined to assess the religious status of Scientology, finding that the question was irrelevant to deciding the case at hand. The Federal Administrative Court for example ruled in 1997 that the question whether or not Scientology was a religion was irrelevant, and that its legal status should be judged by its business activities. The German government does not consider the Church of Scientology to be a religious or worldview community and asserts that Scientology is a profit-making enterprise, rather than a religion. Recent years have seen a number of court decisions in Scientology's favour, despite the very widespread negative attitude to Scientology among politicians and the general public.

== Government surveillance ==
The logo of the Bundesamt für Verfassungsschutz (BfV)

Given the history of Nazism's rise to power in Germany in the 1930s, the present German state has committed itself to taking active steps to prevent the rise of any ideology that threatens the values enshrined in the German constitution. The German Federal Office for the Protection of the Constitution (German: Bundesamt für Verfassungsschutz, or BfV) regards the aims of Scientology as running counter to Germany's free and democratic order, and has been monitoring Scientology since 1997, as have the Offices for the Protection of the Constitution in a number of German Länder. Minister for Family Policy Claudia Nolte instituted the surveillance, saying that the Church of Scientology had totalitarian tendencies and that she would oppose Scientology with all the means at her disposal.

The German Church of Scientology has repeatedly challenged the legality of this surveillance in court, but was ultimately unsuccessful on appeal by the Ministry of the Interior to a federal court. In December 2001, the Administrative Court in Berlin ruled against the Berlin Office for the Protection of the Constitution and ordered it to stop the recruitment and deployment of staff and members of the Church of Scientology Berlin as paid informants. The court ruled that the use of informants was disproportionate. In 2003, the same court ruled that it was illegal for the Berlin Office for the Protection of the Constitution to include the activities of Scientology in its report, given that the report did not document any activities that were opposed to the constitution.

At the federal level, Scientology lost a complaint against continued surveillance by the BfV in November 2004. The federal court based its opinion on its judgment that the aims of Scientology, as outlined by L. Ron Hubbard in his writings, were incompatible with the German constitution. Lawyers acting for the Federal Office for the Protection of the Constitution pointed out that Hubbard had written that civil rights, for example, should be restricted to Scientologists, and they asserted that the Scientology organization was taking systematic steps to infiltrate society and government institutions in order to prevent anti-Scientology legislation. Opposing counsel acting for the Church of Scientology had contended that Scientology was non-political, its aims were the liberation of the human being, and that Hubbard's instructions were valid only within the Church of Scientology and were subject to interpretation, and at any rate there was no effort to implement these instructions in Germany. The court disagreed and ruled that many sources, some of them not accessible to the general public, indicated that the aims of the Church of Scientology did include the abrogation of the principle of equality and other essential human rights.

In Saarland, surveillance was stopped by a court as inappropriate in 2005, because there is no local branch of Scientology and few members. As of 6 May 2008, the Church of Scientology in Germany dropped the legal battle to prevent surveillance of its activities by the BfV after the North Rhine-Westphalia Higher Administrative Court in Münster refused to hear an appeal on the matter. Being suspected of maintaining "ambitions against the free, democratic basic order", the Scientology organization added a declaration on human rights and democracy to its bylaws.

There is at least one example of surveillance of Scientology by the German intelligence services outside of Germany. In 1998, the Swiss government detained an agent of the German government, charging him with "carrying out illegal business for a foreign state, working for a political information service and falsifying identity documents". The German government posted bail for the agent. He was eventually given a 30-day suspended prison sentence for spying on Scientology, and the German government apologised to Switzerland for the incident.

== Sect filters ==
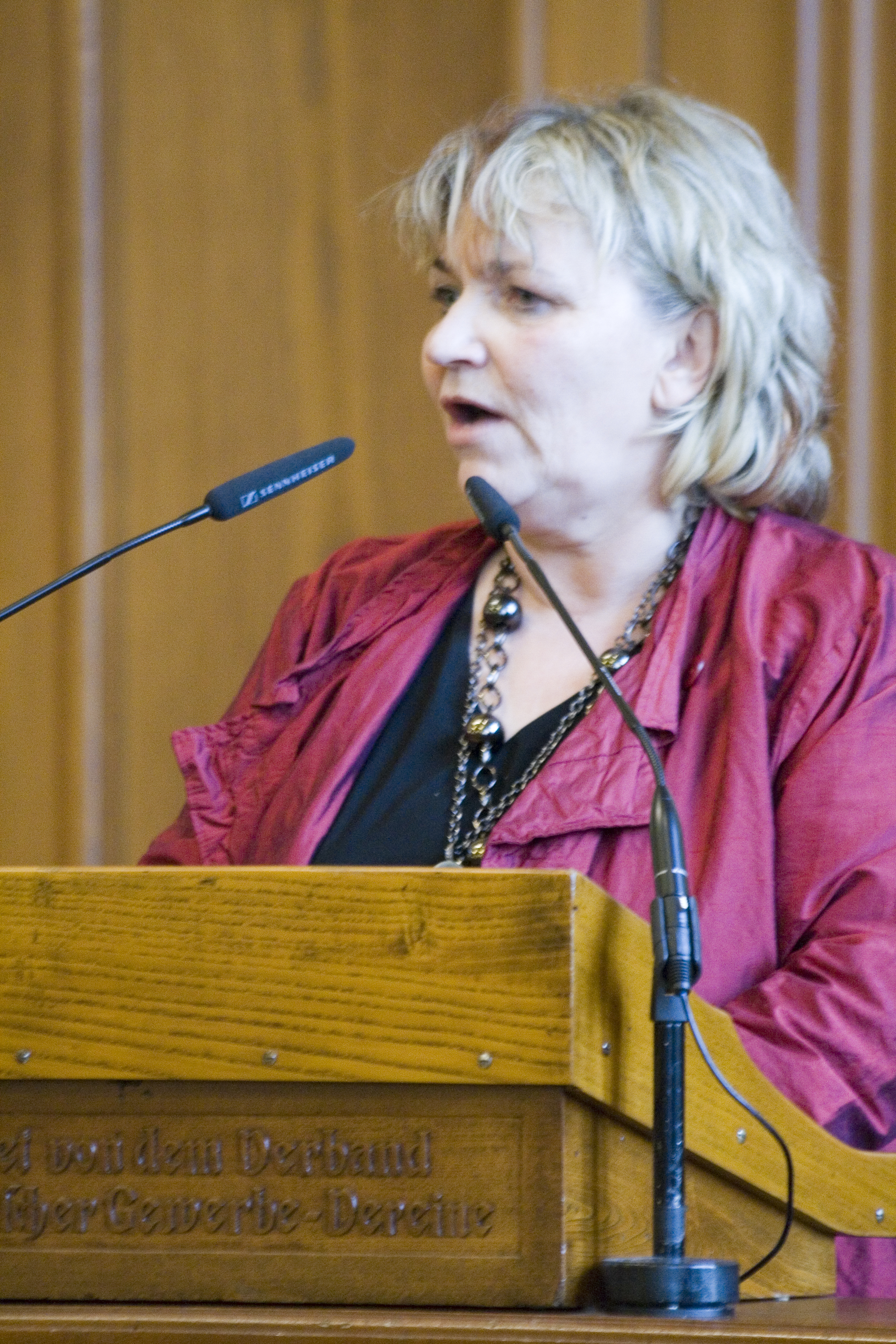
Ursula Caberta speaking in 2008 at a Hamburg conference on Scientology

A "sect filter", also known as a "protective declaration" (Schutzerklärung), is a document that requires prospective business partners or employees to acknowledge any association with a sect or new religious movement before entering a business or employment contract. Such sect filters, primarily used to screen out Scientologists, have been drafted by German government agencies for use by businesses. "Sect commissioner" offices exist in Germany as part of regional or local government.

A work instruction introduced in 1996 requires government staff in the Arbeitsämter – local employment agencies and social security offices operated by the Federal Ministry of Labour and Social Affairs – to mark companies owned by Scientologists with the letter "S". Where companies are suspected of having Scientologist staff, prospective employees are alerted to this fact by government staff. Government officials have publicised the names of individual Scientologists and conducted media campaigns against their businesses; some businesspeople have placed advertisements in the press saying they are not Scientologists in order to avoid the associated stigma.

Due to concerns about possible government infiltration by Scientologists, applicants for civil service positions in Bavaria are required to declare whether or not they are Scientologists, and a similar policy has been instituted in Hesse. Companies tendering for government contracts were likewise required to state they are not Scientologists; in 2001, this requirement was changed, and firms are now asked to sign a form stating that "the technology of L. Ron Hubbard will not be used in executing the contract". When it became known that Microsoft's Windows 2000 operating system included a disk defragmenter developed by Executive Software International (a company headed by a Scientologist), this caused concern among German government officials and clergy over data security and the potential for espionage. To assuage these concerns, Microsoft Germany agreed to provide a means to disable the utility. Following letters of complaint about discrimination from Scientology lawyers, some American companies such as General Electric, IBM and Ford Motor Company instructed their German subsidiaries to cease the use of protective declarations.

The city-state of Hamburg set up a full-time office dedicated to opposing Scientology, the Scientology Task Force for the Hamburg Interior Authority, under the leadership of Ursula Caberta. In 2005, in a case brought by a Scientologist, the Federal Administrative Court of Germany ordered the city of Hamburg to cease recommending the use of protective declarations to its business community, finding that the practice infringed religious freedom. In June 2008, the Hamburg Administrative Court fined the city of Hamburg 5,000 Euros ($7,000) for not complying with court instructions banning the use of "sect filters." Internet links to sample filters to be used by businesses had continued to remain available. Eileen Barker, a professor of sociology at the London School of Economics, has noted that "Germany has gone further than any other Western European country in restricting the civil rights of Scientologists." The Hamburg task force was closed down in August 2010 as a result of budget cuts; Caberta moved to a position within the Hamburg interior authority, where she continues her work on Scientology.

Scientologists have been banned from joining major political parties in Germany such as the Christian Democratic Union, the Christian Social Union of Bavaria, the Social Democratic Party of Germany and the Free Democratic Party. Existing Scientologist members of these parties have been "purged", according to Time magazine. Scientologists have been prevented from running employment and au pair agencies in Germany; Scientologists who were running such agencies had their permits revoked. In 1995, a sports scientist and former member of the German national fencing team was dismissed from his job at the German Olympic fencing centre after he stated in an interview that he had enjoyed reading books by L. Ron Hubbard and had participated in a course run by a Scientologist management and communication consultancy firm. Thomas Gottschalk, a German TV presenter, was falsely accused in 1993 of having taken part in Scientology courses; Gottschalk responded by announcing that he had not, and that he would henceforth cease all contact with a friend who had links to Scientology. In 2007, Günther Oettinger, the Minister-President of the German state of Baden-Württemberg, expressed concern that Scientologist John Travolta was to appear on Gottschalk's programme, and asked the ZDF TV station to consider revoking the invitation; the ZDF said that uninviting Travolta would cause greater damage, and that Scientology was not going to be discussed in the programme.

In 2010, the Bavarian Administrative Court ruled that a woman working in a children's daycare centre, whose employment had been terminated when her ex-husband identified her as a Scientologist, should be reinstated. The woman had demonstrated to the court's satisfaction that her Scientological beliefs were irrelevant to her work. According to the agreement that concluded the case, she promised not to use Scientology methods in her work, and to inform the children's parents of her membership in Scientology.

According to Erin Prophet in Handbook of Scientology some German companies have specifically asked applicants if they are Scientologist, and denied employment to those who are affiliated with the Church of Scientology. Prophet says that similar claims have been made against the Church of Jesus Christ of Latter-day Saints and the Catholic Church.

== Initiative to ban Scientology ==
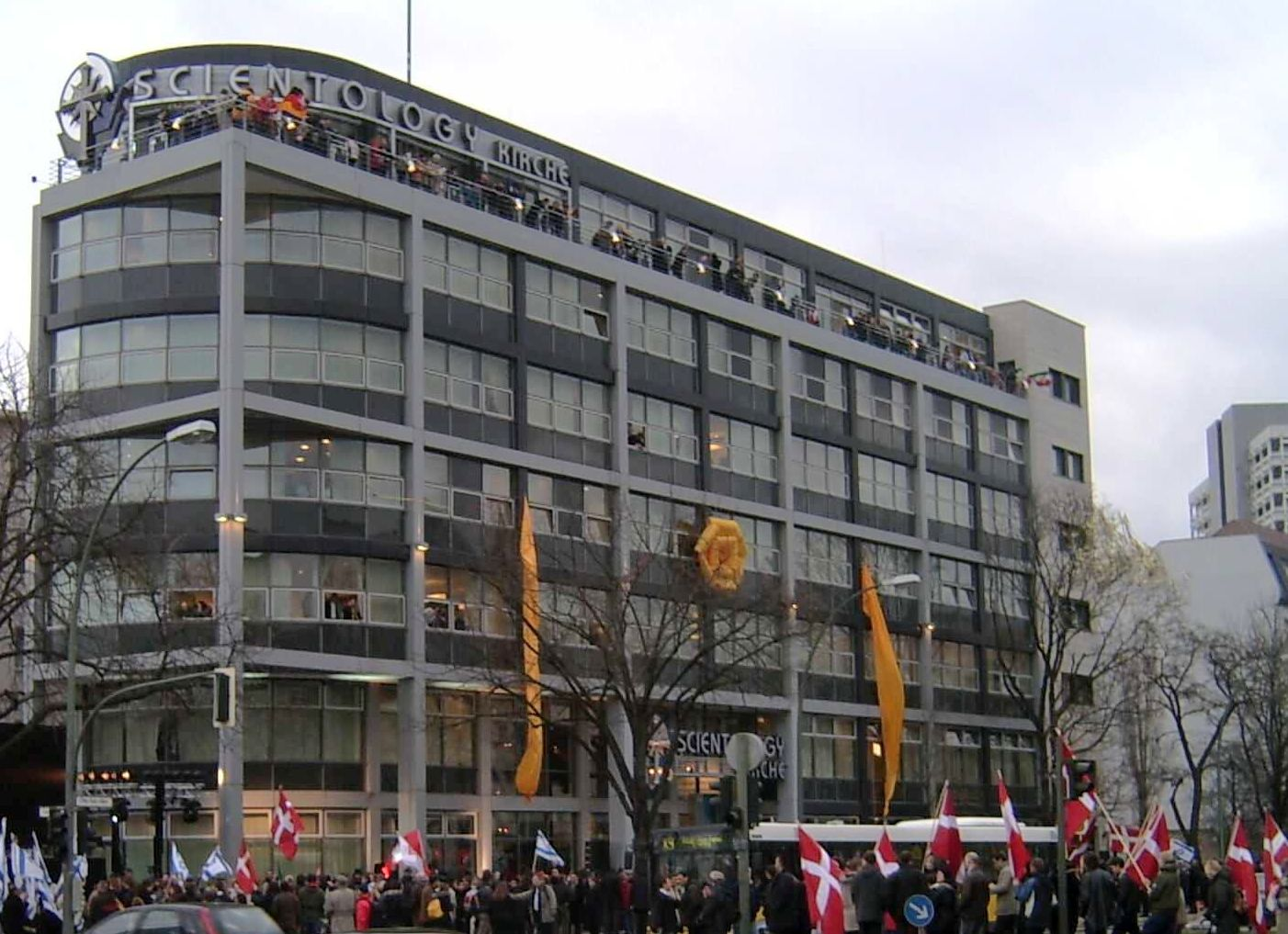
The opening of the Berlin Scientology headquarters was attended by Scientologists from around the world, including celebrities Anne Archer and Chick Corea.

In March 2007, it was reported that German authorities were increasing their efforts to monitor Scientology in response to the opening of a new Scientology headquarters in Berlin. On 7 December 2007, German federal and state interior ministers expressed the opinion that the Scientology organization was continuing to pursue anti-constitutional goals, restricting "essential basic and human rights like the dignity of man or the right to equal treatment", and asked Germany's domestic intelligence agencies to collect and evaluate the information required for a possible judicial inquiry aimed at banning the organization.

The move was criticized by German politicians from all sides of the political spectrum, with legal experts and intelligence agencies expressing concern that an attempt to ban the organization would likely fail in the courts. Sabine Weber, president of the Church of Scientology in Berlin, called the accusations "unrealistic" and "absurd" and said that the German interior ministers' evaluation was based on "a few sentences out of 500,000 pages of Scientological literature". She added, "I can also find hundreds of quotes in the Bible that are totalitarian but that doesn't mean I will demand the ban of Christianity."

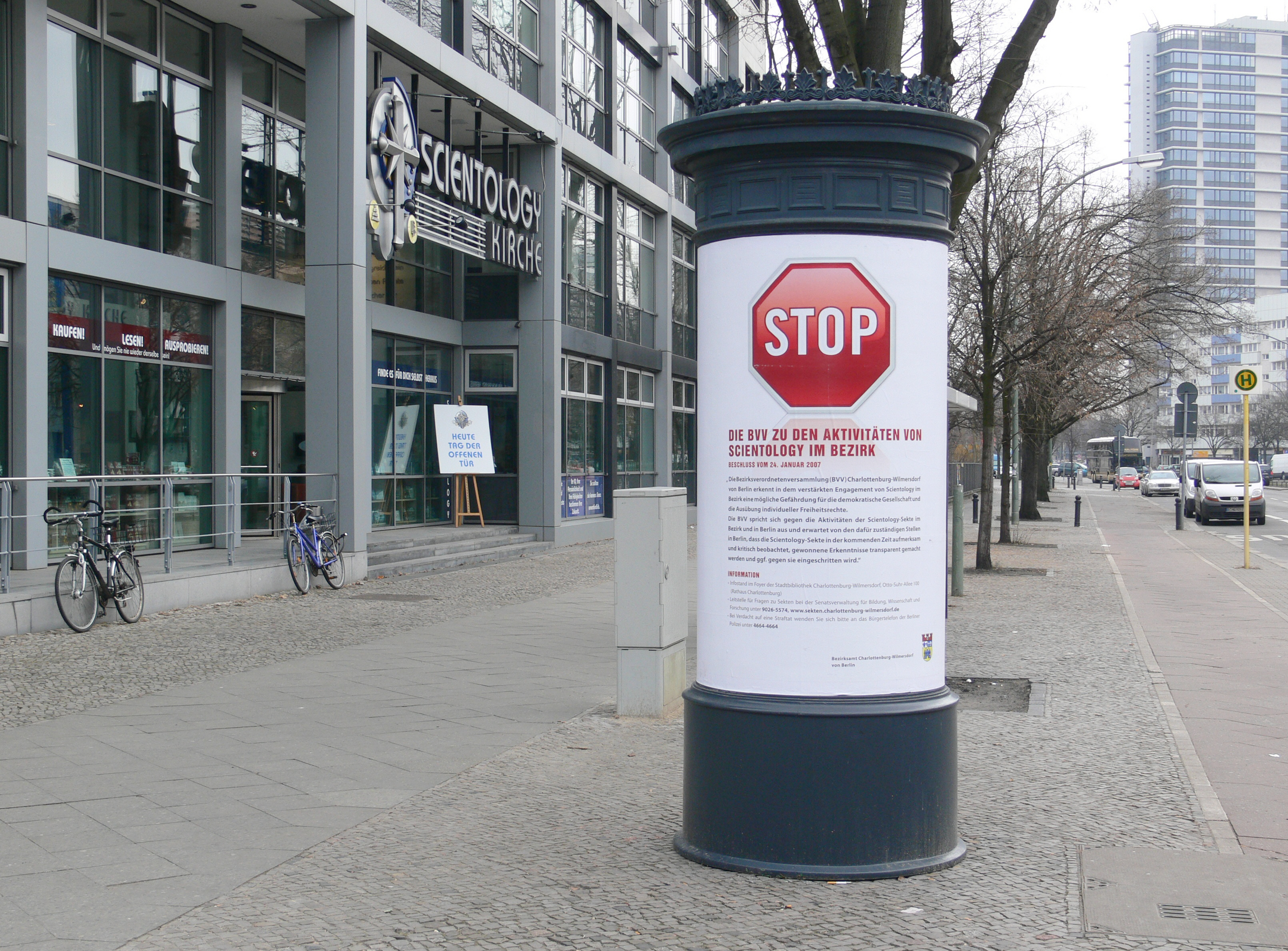
Poster warning of the dangers of Scientology in front of the Berlin headquarters; the courts later ordered the poster's removal.

In November 2008, the government abandoned its attempts to ban Scientology, after finding insufficient evidence of illegal or unconstitutional activity. The report by the BfV cited knowledge gaps and noted several points that would make the success of any legal undertaking to ban Scientology doubtful. First, the BfV report stated there was no evidence that Scientology could be viewed as a foreign organization; there were German churches and missions, a German board, German bylaws, and no evidence that the organization was "totally remote-controlled" from the United States. A foreign organization would have been much easier to ban than a German one. The second argument on which those proposing the ban had counted was Scientology's aggressive opposition to the constitution. Here, the report found that Scientology's behaviour gave no grounds to assume that Scientology aggressively sought to attack and overthrow Germany's free and democratic basic order. "Neither its bylaws nor any other utterances" supported the "conclusion that the organization had criminal aims". The BfV also considered whether there were grounds to act against the Church of Scientology on the basis that they were practising medicine without a licence, but expressed doubts that a court would accept this reasoning.

Commenting on the decision to drop the ban attempt, Ehrhart Körting, Berlin's interior minister, said, "This organization pursues goals – through its writings, its concept and its disrespect for minorities – that we cannot tolerate and that we consider in violation of the constitution. But they put very little of this into practice. The appraisal of the Government at the moment is that [Scientology] is a lousy organization, but it is not an organization that we have to take a hammer to." The Church of Scientology expressed satisfaction with the decision, describing it as the "only one possible". Monitoring of Scientology's activities by the German intelligence services continues.

In February 2009, the Berlin Administrative Court ruled that a poster placed by local city authorities on an advertising column next to a bus stop in front of the Berlin Scientology headquarters, warning passers-by of the potential dangers Scientology activities posed to democracy and individual freedom, should be removed. The decision was upheld in July 2009 by the Upper Administrative Court of Berlin-Brandenburg, which ruled that the poster violated Scientologists' basic religious rights.

== Criticism of Germany's stance ==
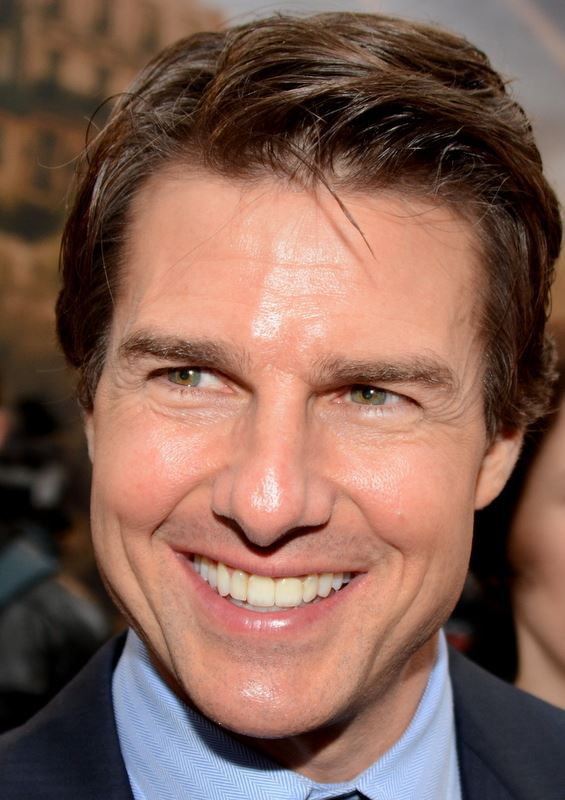
Tom Cruise is one of several Scientologist artists who have been subject to boycott calls in Germany.

The United States media, while generally reporting negatively on Scientology in domestic news, has taken an at least partially supportive stance towards Scientology in relation to Germany. Richard Cohen for example, writing in The Washington Post, said in 1996: "Scientology might be one weird religion, but the German reaction to it is weirder still – not to mention disturbing." Alan Cowell, writing in The New York Times, wrote in 1997 that the German response to Scientology – motivated by officials' fear that Scientology "was a totalitarian movement growing, like the Nazi party, from inconsequential beginnings" – was itself redolent of "the Nazi era's authoritarianism".

The U.S. Department of State has repeatedly claimed that Germany's actions constitute government and societal discrimination against minority religious groups and expressed its concerns over the violation of Scientologists' individual rights posed by sect filters. The U.S. Department of State began to include the issue of Scientology in Germany in its annual human rights reports after the 1993 agreement between the Church of Scientology and the U.S. Internal Revenue Service, through which Scientology gained the status of a tax-exempt religion in the United States. That decision also marked the beginning of more intense lobbying efforts by the Church of Scientology in Washington, using paid lobbyists. The State Department's 1996 human rights report on Germany, released in January 1997, warned that artists and businesses with Scientology connections "may face boycotts and discrimination, sometimes with government approval." Past targets of such actions had included Scientologist actors Tom Cruise and John Travolta, as well as jazz pianist Chick Corea.

Also in January 1997, an open letter to then-Chancellor Helmut Kohl appeared, published as a newspaper advertisement in the International Herald Tribune, drawing parallels between the "organized oppression" of Scientologists in Germany and Nazi policies espoused by Germany in the 1930s. The letter was conceived and paid for by Hollywood lawyer Bertram Fields, whose clients have included Tom Cruise and John Travolta, and was signed by 34 prominent figures in the U.S. entertainment industry, including the top executives of MGM, Warner Bros., Paramount, Universal and Sony Pictures Entertainment as well as actors Dustin Hoffman and Goldie Hawn, director Oliver Stone, writers Mario Puzo and Gore Vidal and talk-show host Larry King. It echoed similar parallels drawn by the Church of Scientology itself, which until then had received scant notice, and was followed by lobbying efforts of Scientology celebrities in Washington.

U.S. Department of State spokesman Nicholas Burns rejected the Nazi comparisons in the open letter as "outrageous" and distanced the U.S. government from Nazi comparisons made by the Church of Scientology, saying, "We have criticized the Germans on this, but we aren't going to support the Scientologists' terror tactics against the German government." Chancellor Kohl, commenting on the letter, said that those who signed it "don't know a thing about Germany and don't want to know." German officials argued that "the whole fuss was cranked up by the Scientologists to achieve what we won't give them: tax-exempt status as a religion. This is intimidation, pure and simple." Officials explained that precisely because of Germany's Nazi past, Germany took a determined stance against all "radical cults and sects, including right-wing Nazi groups", and not just against Scientology. Kohl's Christian Democratic Union party denounced the letter as "absurd" and cited German court rulings stating that Scientology had primarily economic goals and could legitimately be referred to using phrases such as a "contemptuous cartel of oppression".

In February 1997, a United States immigration court judge granted asylum to a German Scientologist who claimed she would be subject to religious persecution in her homeland. In April 1997, John Travolta met U.S. President Bill Clinton at a conference in Philadelphia. Travolta later said Clinton assured him that he would "really love to help" with the "issue over in Germany with Scientology". According to Travolta, Clinton recalled that "he had a roommate years ago who was a Scientologist and had really liked him, and respected his views on it", stating that Scientologists "were given an unfair hand in [Germany] and that he wanted to fix it". In September 1997, John Travolta, Chick Corea and fellow Scientologist Isaac Hayes were heard by the Commission on Security and Cooperation in Europe (CSCE, also known as the Helsinki Commission), voicing their complaints about the treatment of Scientologists in Germany, and had a briefing with United States National Security Advisor Sandy Berger, whom Clinton had assigned to be "the administration's Scientology point person". The German ambassador responded with a letter to the CSCE stating that the German government had come to the conclusion that Scientology's "pseudo-scientific courses can seriously jeopardize individuals' mental and physical health and that it exploits its members", adding that "membership can lead to psychological and physical dependency, to financial ruin, and even to suicide. In addition, there are indications that Scientology poses a threat to Germany's basic political principles."

A United Nations report in April 1998 raised concerns about the violation of individual rights posed by sect filters. However, it rejected the comparison of the treatment of Scientologists with that of Jews during the Nazi era.

In 2000, the German Stern magazine published the results of its investigation of the asylum case. It asserted that several rejection letters which the woman had submitted as part of her asylum application – ostensibly from potential employers who were rejecting her because she was a Scientologist – had in fact been written by fellow Scientologists at her request and that of Scientology's Office of Special Affairs, and that she was in personal financial trouble and about to go on trial for tax evasion at the time she applied for asylum. On a 2000 visit to Clearwater, Florida, Ursula Caberta of the Scientology Task Force for the Hamburg Interior Authority likewise alleged that the asylum case had been part of an "orchestrated effort" by Scientology undertaken "for political gain", and "a spectacular abuse of the U.S. system". German expatriate Scientologists resident in Clearwater, in turn, accused Caberta of stoking a "hate campaign" in Germany that had "ruined the lives and fortunes of scores of Scientologists" and maintained that Scientologists had not "exaggerated their plight for political gain in the United States." Mark Rathbun, a (former) top Church of Scientology official, said that although Scientology had not orchestrated the case, "there would have been nothing improper if it had."

In 2003, Joachim Güntner, writing in the Swiss Neue Zürcher Zeitung, noted that Gerhard Besier, a German Christian theologian, director of the Hannah Arendt Institute for Research into Totalitarianism in Dresden and recipient of an honorary doctorate from Lund University, Sweden, for his championing of religious freedom, had been pressured to forego publication of his scientific study of Scientology after becoming the subject of widespread criticism in the German media for advocating a more tolerant attitude towards Scientology. Güntner concluded that "alarmism" had "triumphed" over science and noted an apparent lack of confidence in Germany's ability to engage in open public discourse on the matter.

The U.S. Department of State's 2012 report on religious freedom in Germany, published in 2013, stated that "The status of the Church of Scientology remains in limbo. The Constitutional Court and various courts at the state level have not explicitly ruled that Scientology is a religion. Government agencies at the federal and state level have rules and procedures that discriminate against Scientology as a group and against its members. Four of the major political parties (the Christian Democratic Union, Christian Social Union, Social Democratic Party, and Free Democratic Party) ban Scientologists from party membership. [...] Scientologists reported instances of governmental discrimination. Although courts at the state and federal level condemned the improper use of so-called 'sect filters' to blacklist and boycott Scientologists, they remained in use in the public sector. 'Sect filters' typically asked potential new employees to confirm in writing that they had no contact with Scientology, did not participate in its training courses, and rejected its doctrines. [...] Catholic and Protestant churches continued to oppose Scientology publically [sic], although press reporting and public reactions to Scientology decreased. Several private organizations issued warnings about after-school study programs run by Scientologists."

== See also ==
- Scientology status by country § Germany
- Scientology Task Force of the Hamburg Interior Authority

== Sources ==
=== Scholarly sources ===
- Beit-Hallahmi, Benjamin (September 2003), "Scientology: Religion or racket?" (PDF), Marburg Journal of Religion, 8 (1)
- Besier, Renate-Maria; Neumann, Johannes (2004), "Scientology – Was ist das?", Zeitdiagnosen: Religionsfreiheit und Konformismus. Über Minderheiten und die Macht der Mehrheit (in German), Münster, Germany: Lit Verlag, ISBN 3-8258-7654-3
- Boyle, Kevin; Sheen, Juliet (1997), Freedom of Religion and Belief: A World Report, London: Routledge, ISBN 978-0-415-15978-4
- Browne, Michael (1998), "Should Germany Stop Worrying and Love the Octopus? Freedom of Religion and the Church of Scientology in Germany and the United States", Indiana International & Comparative Law Review, 9 (1): 155–202, doi:10.18060/17460
- Davis, Derek H. (1999), "Fortschritt des Wahnsinns: Die erneuerte Verfolgung unpopulärer Religionen durch Deutschland in historischer Perspektive", in Besier, Gerhard; Scheuch, Erwin K. (eds.), Die neuen Inquisitoren: Religionsfreiheit und Glaubensneid (Teil I) (in German), Zürich: Edition Interfrom, ISBN 3-7201-5277-4
- Fifka, Matthias S.; Sykora, Nadine (2009), Scientology in Deutschland und den USA: Strukturen, Praktiken und öffentliche Wahrnehmung (in German), Münster, Germany: Lit Verlag, ISBN 978-3-643-10248-5
- Fox, Jonathan (2008), World Survey of Religion and the State, Cambridge University Press, ISBN 978-0-521-70758-9
- Hendon, David W.; Allman, Dwight David (Summer 1998), "Notes on Church-State Affairs: Germany", Journal of Church & State, 40 (3), doi:10.1093/jcs/40.4.919
- Hendon, David W.; Kennedy, James M. (Spring 1996), "Notes on Church-State Affairs: Germany", Journal of Church & State, 38 (2), doi:10.1093/jcs/38.4.933
- Hexham, Irving (1998), Religious Freedom in Germany: Mirage or Reality?
- Kent, Stephen A. (1999), "The Globalization of Scientology – Influence, Control, and Opposition in Transnational Markets", Religion, 29 (2): 147–169, doi:10.1006/reli.1998.0154
- Kent, Stephen A. (January 2001), "The French and German versus American Debate over 'New Religions', Scientology, and Human Rights" (PDF), Marburg Journal of Religion, 6 (1)
- Kent, Stephen A. (2002), "Hollywood's Celebrity Lobbyists and the Clinton Administration's American Foreign Policy Toward German Scientology", Journal of Religion and Popular Culture, I (Spring 2002), archived from the original on April 2, 2012
- Kent, Stephen A. (April 16, 2008), "Scientology, Hollywood and the path to Washington (interview)", The Religion Report, ABC Radio National
- Lehmann, Hartmut (2004), Koexistenz und Konflikt von Religionen im Vereinten Europa, Wallstein Verlag, ISBN 3-89244-746-2 (in German and English)
- Luca, Nathalie (2004), "Is There a Unique French Policy of Cults? A European Perspective", in Richardson, James T. (ed.), Regulating Religion: Case Studies from Around the Globe, New York, NY: Luwer Academic/Plenum Publishers, ISBN 0-306-47887-0
- Melton, J. Gordon (2000), The Church of Scientology, Salt Lake City: Signature Press, ISBN 1-56085-139-2
- Palmer, Susan J. (2009), "The Church of Scientology in France: Legal and Activist Counterattacks in the 'War on Sectes'", in Lewis, James R. (ed.), Scientology, New York, NY: Oxford University Press, ISBN 978-0-19-533149-3
- Richardson, James T. (2009), "Scientology in Court: A Look at Some Major Cases from Various Nations", in Lewis, James R. (ed.), Scientology, New York, NY: Oxford University Press, ISBN 978-0-19-533149-3
- Scherff, Franziska (2008), Scientology in Deutschland – eine Herausforderung für Politik, Staat und Gesellschaft (in German), Munich/Ravensburg, Germany: GRIN Verlag, ISBN 978-3-640-11048-3
- Schön, Brigitte (January 2001), "Framing Effects in the Coverage of Scientology versus Germany: Some Thoughts on the Role of Press and Scholars" (PDF), Marburg Journal of Religion, 6 (1)
- Seiwert, Hubert (2004), "The German Enquete Commission: Political Conflicts and Compromises", in Richardson, James T. (ed.), Regulating Religion: Case Studies from Around the Globe, New York, NY: Luwer Academic/Plenum Publishers, ISBN 0-306-47887-0
- Shupe, Anson; Darnell, Susan E. (2006), Agents of Discord, New Brunswick (U.S.A.), London (U.K.): Transaction Publishers, ISBN 0-7658-0323-2
- Weber, Hermann (1999), "Minderheitenreligionen in der staatlichen Rechtsordnung", in Besier, Gerhard; Scheuch, Erwin K. (eds.), Die neuen Inquisitoren: Religionsfreiheit und Glaubensneid (Teil I) (in German), Zürich: Edition Interfrom, ISBN 3-7201-5277-4
- Willms, Gerald (2005), Scientology – Kulturbeobachtungen jenseits der Devianz (in German), Bielefeld: transcript Verlag, ISBN 3-89942-330-5
- Zacharias, Diana (October 1, 2006), "Protective Declarations Against Scientology as Unjustified Detriments to Freedom of Religion: A Comment on the Decision of the German Federal Administrative Court of 15 December 2005", German Law Journal, 7 (10), doi:10.1017/S2071832200005149, S2CID 146503378, archived from the original on February 17, 2009

=== Journalistic sources ===
- Barber, Tony (January 30, 1997), "Germany is harassing Scientologists, says US", The Independent
- Bonfante, Jordan; van Voorst, Bruce (February 10, 1997), "Does Germany Have Something Against These Guys?", Time, archived from the original on July 8, 2007
- Brendel, Sabine (April 3, 2009), "Sekten – Scientology unterwandert Firmen", Der Westen (WAZ) (in German)
- Cieply, Michael; Landler, Mark (June 30, 2007), "Plot Thickens in a Tom Cruise Film, Long Before the Cameras Begin to Roll", The New York Times
- Cockburn, Alexander (April 10, 1998), "Will Scientology Bring Down Germany?", Albion Monitor
- Cohen, Richard (November 15, 1996), "Germany's Odd Obsession With Scientology", The Washington Post, archived from the original on October 23, 2012 – via HighBeam Research
- Cowell, Alan (November 23, 1997), "Ideas & Trends; Germany the Unloved Just Wants to Be Normal", The New York Times
- Dahl, David (March 29, 1998), "Scientology's influence grows in Washington", St. Petersburg Times
- Drozdiak, William (January 14, 1997), "U.S. Celebrities Defend Scientology in Germany", The Washington Post, p. A11, archived from the original on June 10, 2009
- Eddy, Melissa (May 6, 2008), "German Scientology church drops court challenge; adds human rights declaration to bylaws", Santa Barbara News-Press
- Fischer, Michael (November 23, 2008), "Germany abandons bid to ban Scientology", The Age
- Fleischhauer, Jan (April 1, 1991), "Lieber tot als unfähig" [Better dead than incompetent], Der Spiegel (in German), vol. 14
- Frantz, Douglas (November 8, 1997), "U.S. Immigration Court Grants Asylum to German Scientologist", The New York Times, archived from the original on October 17, 2015
- Frantz, Douglas (March 9, 1997), "Scientology's Puzzling Journey From Tax Rebel to Tax Exempt", The New York Times
- Fröhlingsdorf, Michael; Stark, Holger (September 22, 2008), "Verfassungsschutz: Kampf ums Bushäuschen", Der Spiegel (in German), vol. 39, no. 39/2008, archived from the original on October 26, 2009
- Grieshaber, Kirsten (December 9, 2007), "German official seeks ban on Scientology", USA Today / AP
- Güntner, Joachim (November 24, 2003), "Toleranzübung auf problematischem Felde – Scientology und der 'Fall' Besier", Neue Zürcher Zeitung
- Güntner, Joachim (June 30, 2004), "Beharren auf dem Rechtsstandpunkt. Erneuter Wirbel um Gerhard Besier, das Hannah-Arendt-Institut und Scientology", Neue Zürcher Zeitung
- Haddadin, Haitham (November 6, 2000), "Scientologist-software man blasts Germany", Independent Online
- Havekost, Folke (August 19, 2010), "Hamburg spart 'Sektentante' ein", Neues Deutschland
- Hering, Lars (November 11, 2004), "Scientology darf weiter beobachtet werden", Kölnische Rundschau (in German), archived from the original on July 19, 2011
- jot (May 19, 2010), "Scientologin darf weiter Kinder betreuen", Abendzeitung (in German)
- Kleinhubbert, Guido (June 22, 2006), "Scientology in Germany: Suspicious Tutoring", Spiegel Online, archived from the original on August 25, 2007
- Lauter, Devorah (October 28, 2009), "French Scientology group convicted of fraud", Los Angeles Times
- Masters, Kim (February 10, 1997), "Hollywood's Glitterati Circle the Wagons", Time, archived from the original on January 1, 2007
- Moore, Tristana (January 13, 2008), "Scientologists in German push", BBC News, BBC
- Nordhausen, Frank; von Billerbeck, Liane (2008), Scientology. Wie der Sektenkonzern die Welt erobern will (in German), Berlin: Ch. Links Verlag, ISBN 978-3-86153-470-9
- Schmid, John (January 15, 1997), "German Party Replies To Scientology Backers", International Herald Tribune, archived from the original on October 26, 2005
- Smee, Jess (January 21, 2008), "German historian likens Cruise speech to Goebbels", The Guardian
- Solms-Laubach, Franz (December 7, 2007), "Innenminister fordern Verbot von Scientology", Die Welt (in German)
- Staff (September 15, 2010), "Hamburger SPD fordert Erhalt der Scientology Arbeitsgruppe", Ad Hoc News, archived from the original on July 3, 2012
- Staff (December 1, 1999), "Scientology Spying by a German Official Spurs Jail Term", AP
- Staff (April 9, 1998), "Germany apologises to Switzerland for spying on Scientologists", BBC News
- Staff (June 23, 1998), "German charged with spying on Scientologists", BBC News
- Staff (December 5, 2003), "Verfassungsgericht weist Klage von Scientology gegen Beobachtung ab", Berliner Morgenpost (in German)
- Staff (January 15, 2007), "Organisation mit bundesweit 5000 Anhängern", Berliner Morgenpost (in German)
- Staff (June 24, 2007), "Scientology", Berliner Morgenpost (in German)
- Staff (December 14, 2001), "Keine V-Leute", Berliner Zeitung (in German)
- Staff (November 21, 2008), "Germany drops attempt to ban Scientology", CBC News / AP
- Staff (November 21, 2008), "Kein Verbotsverfahren gegen die Scientology-Organisation", Deutsche Welle (in German)
- Staff (December 12, 2003), "Urteil: Scientology ist kein Wirtschaftsbetrieb", domradio.de (in German), Cologne Archdiocese radio station
- Staff (July 19, 1993), "Der doppelte Gottschalk", Focus (in German)
- Staff (October 22, 1995), "Fecht-As muss gehen", Focus (in German)
- Staff (December 7, 2007), "Innenminister erwägen Verbot – 'Scientology unvereinbar mit dem Grundgesetz'", Frankfurter Allgemeine Zeitung (in German)
- Staff (January 13, 2007), "Scientology Church Opens In Berlin", Life.com
- Staff (December 3, 2007), "Hamburg strebt Scientology-Verbot an", Netzeitung / AP (in German), archived from the original on December 4, 2008
- Staff (April 27, 2005), "Scientology darf nicht mehr ausspioniert werden", Spiegel Online (in German), archived from the original on August 27, 2005
- Staff (September 15, 2006), "USA finden Deutschland zu intolerant", Spiegel Online (in German), archived from the original on August 19, 2007
- Staff (March 27, 2007), "Scientology-Anhänger Travolta: Bei "Wetten, dass ...?" nicht willkommen", Spiegel Online (in German), archived from the original on August 19, 2007
- Staff (December 10, 2007), "Lack of Evidence: Agencies Warn Scientology Ban Doomed to Fail", Spiegel Online, archived from the original on January 12, 2008
- Staff (December 8, 2007), "Scientology – Zweifel an Verbotsplänen", Tagesspiegel (in German)
- Staff (July 14, 2009), "Oberverwaltungsgericht: Plakat vor Scientology-Zentrale bleibt verboten", Tagesspiegel (in German)
- Staff (June 16, 2009), "Offener, als ich vermutet habe", taz (in German)
- Staff (February 1, 1997), "Germany, America and Scientology", The Washington Post, archived from the original on October 23, 2012 – via HighBeam Research
- Staff (July 9, 2007), "Stauffenberg-Film: Rückendeckung aus Hollywood", Die Zeit (in German)
- Stark, Holger; Rosenbach, Marcel (March 27, 2007), "Scientology's New European Offensive: The March of the 'Orgs'", Der Spiegel, archived from the original on June 1, 2007
- Tank, Ron (January 30, 1997), "U.S. report backs Scientologists in dispute with Germany – Anti-church rhetoric escalates in Bonn", CNN Interactive, Reuters
- Tobin, Thomas C. (July 26, 2000), "German visitor takes on Scientology", St. Petersburg Times
- Walker, Ruth (November 18, 1996), "Germany's Probe Into 'Sects' Raises Religious-Freedom Issues", The Christian Science Monitor
- wbo (May 19, 2010), "Innenminister Herrmann fordert Scientology-Verbot", Abendzeitung (in German)

=== Government and court documents ===
- Berichte/Publikationen (in German), Bayerisches Landesamt für Verfassungsschutz (Bavarian State Office for the Protection of the Constitution), archived from the original on February 19, 2012
- Verfassungsschutzbericht 2020 (PDF) (in German), Bundesministerium des Innern, für Bau und Heimat (Federal Ministry of the Interior)
- Staff (December 15, 2005), Urteil BVerwG 7 C 20.04 (PDF) (in German), Bundesverwaltungsgericht (Federal Administrative Court of Germany)
- Background Papers – Scientology and Germany – Understanding the German View of Scientology, German Embassy Washington D.C., 2001, archived from the original on August 13, 2006
- Menzenbach, Steffi; Hippe, Désirée (January 29, 2007), Rechtliche Fragen zu Religions- und Weltanschauungsgemeinschaften (PDF) (in German), Deutscher Bundestag – Wissenschaftliche Dienste (Scientific Services staff of the German Parliament), archived from the original (PDF) on January 25, 2011
- Staff (March 2, 2009), Bezirksamt darf vorerst nicht vor Scientology warnen (Pressemitteilung Nr. 7/2009 vom 02.03.2009) (in German), berlin.de: Senatsverwaltung für Justiz (The Berlin Senate's Justice Department)
- Staff (July 13, 2009), Kein Warnplakat des Bezirksamtes vor Scientology-Zentrale – Pressemitteilung 23/09 vom 13.07.2009 (in German), berlin.de: Senatsverwaltung für Justiz (The Berlin Senate's Justice Department)
- Sammlung der zur Veröffentlichung freigegebenen Beschlüsse der 185. Sitzung der Ständigen Konferenz der Innenminister und -senatoren der Länder am 7. Dezember 2007 in Berlin (German interior ministers' conference resolutions released for publication) (PDF) (in German), Geschäftsstelle der Ständigen Konferenz der Innenminister und -senatoren der Länder, December 7, 2007, archived from the original (PDF) on March 19, 2009
- U.S. Department of State – Bureau of Democracy, Human Rights and Labor (February 25, 2009), 2008 Human Rights Report: Germany, archived from the original on February 26, 2009
- U.S. Department of State (1999), 1999 Report on International Religious Freedom – Germany
- U.S. Department of State – Bureau of Democracy, Human Rights and Labor (November 17, 2010), Germany. International Religious Freedom Report 2010, archived from the original on November 23, 2010
- U.S. Department of State – Bureau of Democracy, Human Rights and Labor (2014), Germany. International Religious Freedom Report for 2012
- Staff (December 12, 2003), "Entziehung der Rechtsfähigkeit des Vereins "Scientology Gemeinde Baden-Württemberg e.V." nicht rechtens", Press Statement of Verwaltungsgerichtshof Baden-Württemberg (Baden-Württemberg Administrative Court) (in German)

=== Scientology sources ===
- "Scientology Mitgliederzahl in Deutschland, Europa, USA und weltweit?". Scientology-Fakten.de (in German). 2012. Archived from the original on May 31, 2013.
