= OJC =

OJC may refer to:

- Central Ojibwa language (ISO 639-3 designation)
- Johnson County Executive Airport (IATA airport code)
- Operation Just Cause, the 1989–1990 United States invasion of Panama
- Original Jazz Classics, an American record label
- Otero College (formerly Otero Junior College), La Junta, Colorado, US
- Reichenberg Fellowship (German: Offensive Junger Christen), a German non-denominational ecumenical community
