= Scientology Task Force of the Hamburg Interior Authority =

German government organization, 1992–2010

- Logo of the Scientology Task Force of the Hamburg Interior Authority

- zone of authority
- Formation: 1992
- Dissolved: 2010
- Type: German government organization
- Location: Hamburg, Germany
- Official language: German
- Commissioner: Ursula Caberta
- Website: Home page

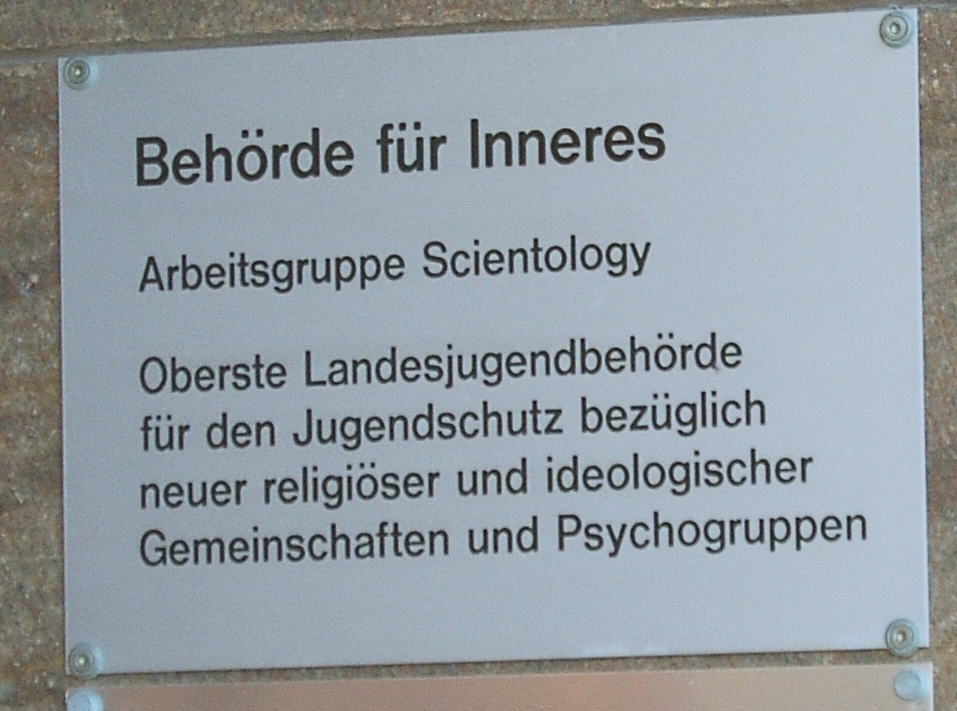
translation: Interior Authority · Scientology Task Force · Supreme State Youth Authority on Youth Protection regarding New Religious and Ideological Communities and Psycho-Groups

The Scientology Task Force of the Hamburg Interior Authority (German: Behörde für Inneres – Arbeitsgruppe Scientology) was founded in 1992 to monitor the activities and publications of Scientology, raise public awareness about the organization, and serve as a resource to Scientology members who may wish to exit the group. The Hamburg government made the decision to form the task force in 1991, after claiming in public statements that the Church of Scientology's aims included world domination and the destruction of society. Other German politicians stated that Scientology planned to infiltrate businesses and the government.

The Task Force was closed in 2010 as a result of budget cuts, with leader Ursula Caberta continuing to work as consultant for the Hamburg local government.

== Organization ==
The task force was part of the Hamburg State Ministry of the Interior. It was led by Commissioner Ursula Caberta, a Hamburg government official widely cited in the German press as an expert on sects and Scientology. Caberta served as an expert on behalf of the task force for the German Parliament's Enquete-Kommission. After the 2010 closure of the Task Force, Caberta took a post within the Hamburg State Ministry of the Interior. A ministry spokesman said she would continue to provide information on Scientology to the public, but individual counselling would henceforth be provided by a staff member of the Verfassungsschutz (Office for the Protection of the Constitution).

== Function ==
The task force was set up with the full-time mission of monitoring Scientology activities in Germany. It was reported to have denied Scientology access to the real estate market in Hamburg. Commissioner Ursula Caberta also helped the task force convince local banks to deny loans to Scientology organizations and Scientologists. In the mid-1990s the task force invented and distributed a form that was used for a job or association membership applicant to sign that s/he does not use the technology of L. Ron Hubbard.

In December 2005 the Federal Administrative Court prohibited the task force from distributing this form. The court took the view that distribution of the form violated the freedom of religion guaranteed by the German constitution. In June 2008 the Task Force was fined €5,000 for refusing to comply with the court's decision, having continued to make the form available.

== Publications ==
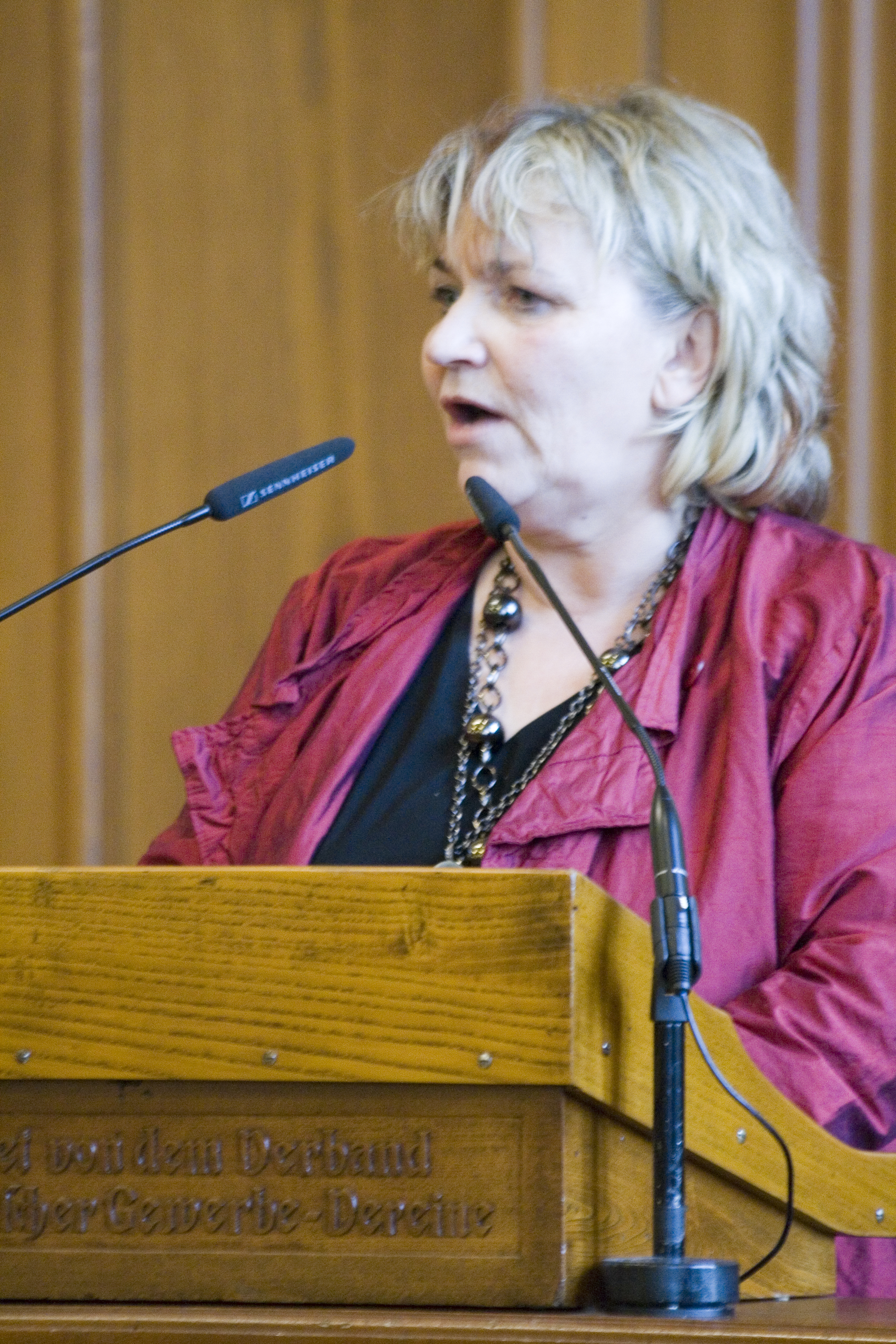
Ursula Caberta speaking in 2008 at a Hamburg conference on Scientology

The task force published a number of reports, some in English, including "Brainwashing in Scientology's Rehabilitation Project Force" by Stephen A. Kent.

The report examines the confinement programs and camps which the task force states that Scientology operates as 'rehabilitative facilities for deviant members of its elite Sea Organization.' According to the report, these programs, known collectively as the Rehabilitation Project Force (RPF), put coerced participants through regimes of harsh physical punishment, forced self-confessions, social isolation, hard labor, and intense doctrinal study, all as part of leadership-designed efforts to regain members’ ideological commitment. The report continued by asserting that the confinement the participants experience, combined with forms of physical maltreatment, intensive ideological study, and forced confessions, are considered by social scientists a "brainwashing" program.

The task force posted comments on the city's website, in English, containing its assessment of the European Court of Human Rights decision against Russia's attempt to not register Scientology as a religious organization.

In the opinion of the Task Force, "The ECHR itself did not consider whether the Scientology organisation as such meets the characteristics of a religion (or religious community) within the meaning of article 9 of the European Convention on Human Rights in terms of its structure and beliefs ... without positively according to the Scientology organization as a whole the status of a religious community." The task force then went on to conclude that the Russian authorities are "perfectly entitled to refuse such registration once again for other, sound reasons".

== See also ==
- Scientology in Germany
- Scientology status by country § Germany
