= Ursula Caberta =

German politician

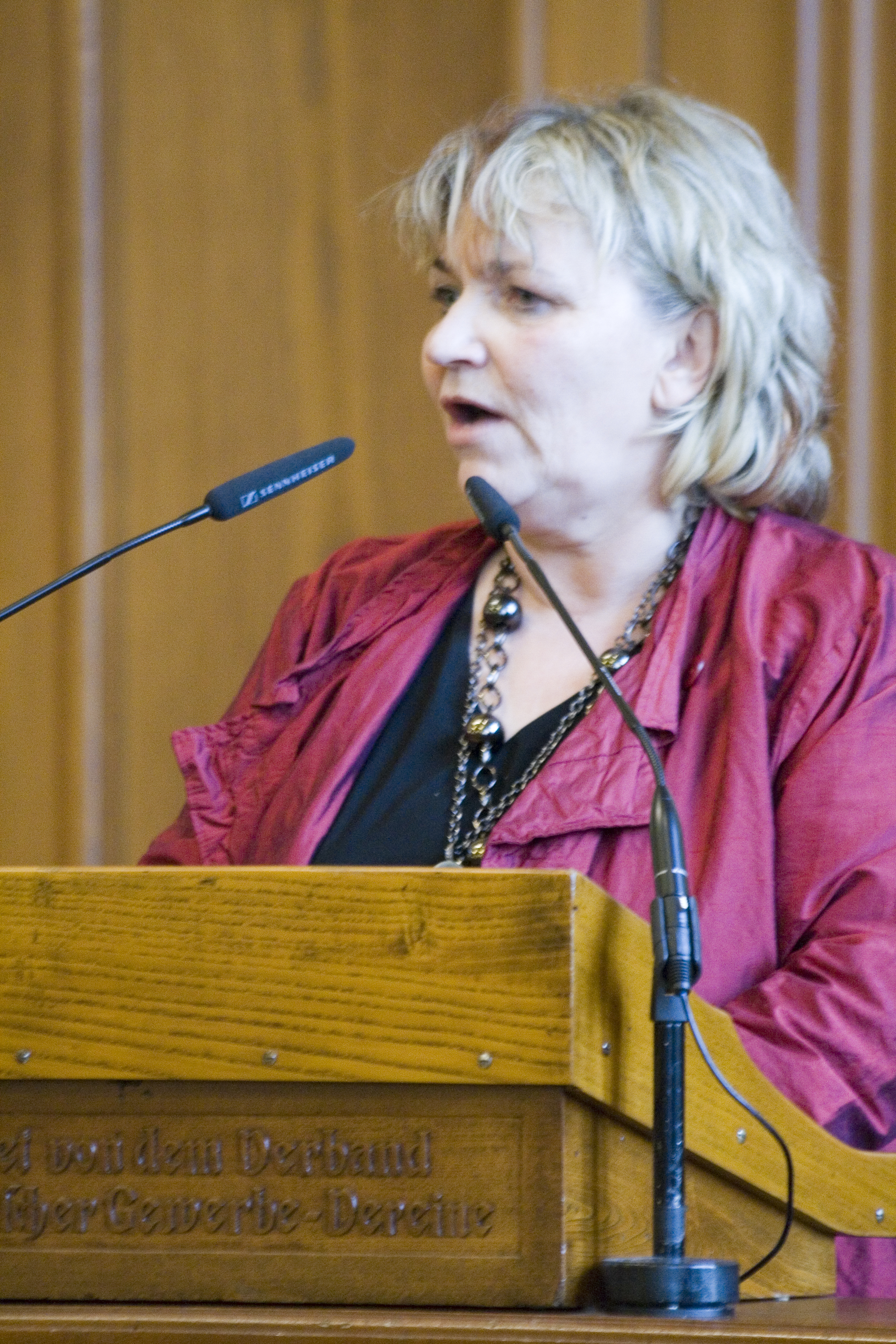
- Speaking at a conference on Scientology in Hamburg, September 2008

Scientology Task Force of the Hamburg Interior Authority
- Constituency: Hamburg, Germany

Personal details
- Born: Hamburg, Germany
- Occupation: Commissioner for the Scientology Task Force of the Hamburg Interior Authority
- Website: Hamburg Scientology Task Force

Ursula Caberta y Diaz (born 22 March 1950) is a German politician, former State of Hamburg government official and was the Commissioner for the Scientology Task Force of the Hamburg Interior Authority. She graduated in political economy. According to Deutsche Welle she is considered an expert on the subject of Scientology, and has been observing the organization since 1992. Her book Schwarzbuch Scientology (The Black Book of Scientology) was published in 2007. Caberta is also an official in Hamburg's authority for interior affairs.

The Hamburg Scientology Task Force (AGS) was founded in 1992, to monitor the activities of Scientology, and educate the public on the activities and objectives of Scientology. Furthermore, the AGS provided advice to people wishing to leave the organization. The Task Force was closed down in 2010 as a result of budget cuts, and its work was continued by the Federal Office for the Protection of the Constitution. Caberta continued as a consultant until her retirement in 2013.

== Critic of Scientology ==
In 1995, Caberta took on an active role in controversies related to Scientology in schools in the Danish town of Bjerndrup near the German border. In 1996, Caberta stated in The New York Times that she saw similarities between Germany's prior history with the Third Reich, and the Church of Scientology. In 2000, Scientology filed a criminal complaint (Strafanzeige) against Caberta for alleged bribery after she was accused of receiving a private loan of 75,000 dollars from Bob Minton. The charges were dropped after Caberta paid a 7,500 Euro fine.

In 2007, Caberta was quoted in Der Spiegel as being worried that the Church of Scientology wanted to influence politics in Germany and throughout Europe. Caberta stated that the Church of Scientology aimed to undermine Germany's democracy with a "cynical ideology". In August 2007, along with Udo Nagel, the Hamburg State Interior Minister, Caberta called for a ban on the Scientology organization, but this was rejected by Federal politicians in Berlin. Wolfgang Bosbach, deputy parliamentary group leader of Chancellor Angela Merkel's CDU said that a bid to outlaw Scientology may fail because Germany's domestic intelligence service is unlikely to have gathered enough evidence against it to back court action against the sect. In 2007 Caberta called Tom Cruise an enemy of the constitution, saying that he was inseparable from his Scientology activity, and that to cast a member of a totalitarian organisation in the role of an enemy of the Nazis was inappropriate. When the Task Force was closed down in 2010 as a result of budget cuts, Caberta moved to a position within the Hamburg interior authority, where she continued her work on Scientology until she retired from the role in 2013, frustrated by lack of support from the local government. The Hamburg Office for the Protection of the Constitution continues to investigate and report on Scientology activity and to counsel people wishing to leave the organisation.

== See also ==
- Scientology in Germany

== Bibliography ==
- Caberta, Ursula (1997). Scientology greift an (in German) (Paperback ed.). Econ Verlag. ISBN 978-3-430-18249-2. ("Scientology attacks")
- Caberta, Ursula (August 2007). Schwarzbuch Scientology (in German) (Paperback ed.). Gütersloher Verlagshaus. ISBN 978-3-579-06974-6. ("The Black Book of Scientology")
- Caberta, Ursula (May 2008). Kindheit bei Scientology: Verboten (in German) (Paperback ed.). Gütersloher Verlagshaus. ISBN 978-3-579-06981-4. ("Childhood in Scientology: Forbidden")
