= Christl Ruth Vonholdt =

German physician

Christl Ruth Vonholdt (born 1954) is a German physician for Child and Adolescent Medicine, former Director of the German Institute for Youth and Society (Deutsches Institut für Jugend und Gesellschaft), Christian author and is member of the Reichenberg Fellowship.

== Life ==
Vonholdt studied medicine and received a doctorate at the Hannover Medical School for a study on varicose veins (Rezidivhäufigkeit und Komplikationen nach operativer Therapie der primären Varikosis (Krampfadern) ). She is specialist (Facharzt) for child and youth medicine

On 18. Oktober 2004 she was invited to an official hearing of the German Parliament by the CDU/CSU-parliamentary faction. She was questioned on the bill calling for the revision of German civil partnership law

2009 she has been lecturer at the International congress on psychiatry and counseling in Marburg, Germany.

== Views on Homosexuality ==
Vonholdt's views on homosexuality are controversial. They are based upon both theological and psychological arguments.

=== Theology ===
From a biblical standpoint, she, together with most Christians worldwide, holds homosexual practise (praktizierte Homosexualität) to be sinful.

She states that, from a theological perspective, it is only the unity of man and woman which is able to represent a complete human being and marriage is an icon of God, a reflection of God's image. Sexuality is the creative energy which enables us reach out beyond ourselves to the opposite sex. Homosexual intercourse has been called sin by Jews and Christians because it fails to be an icon of God. She believes the argument, that homosexuality is natural and therefore, not to be considered sin, has its roots in Gnosticism.

In regards to the religious viewpoint, Vonholdt has expressed her belief that God has created everyone with sexuality. It is the duty of man to then be oriented in the correct manner, which is toward the opposite sex.

=== Psychology ===
From a psychological standpoint, she regards homosexuality to be a symptom for a deeper underlying dysfunction. She assumes that homosexuality can be caused by deep emotional suffering in early childhood. Based on this assumption she recommends therapy for egodystonic homosexuals. She describes it, in the Catholic journal Communio, as the "development of a mature heterosexual potential".

== Works ==
=== Books ===
- Christl Ruth Vonholdt: Rezidivhäufigkeit und Komplikationen nach operativer Therapie der primären Varikosis. Dissertation an der Medizinischen Hochschule Hannover, Hannover 1981
- Christl Ruth Vonholdt (Ed.): Striving for Gender Identity: Homosexuals and Christian Counseling. A workbook for the Church. Reichelsheim 1996, Reichenberg Fellowship
- Christl Ruth Vonholdt, Gerhard Besier und Hermann Klenk: Christliche Hoffnung, Weltoffenheit, Gemeinsames Leben. Gelbe Mammuts auf dem Berg. Festschrift für Horst-Klaus Hofmann, Brunnen-Verlag, Gießen 1998, ISBN 3-7655-6326-9
- Christl Ruth Vonholdt, Andreas Laun, Norbert Geis et at. (Hrsg.): Homo-Ehe. Nein zum Ja-Wort aus christlicher Sicht. Zisterzienserkonvent Langwaden, 2001, ISBN 3-934551-34-3
- Christl Ruth Vonholdt [Hrsg.]: Verwundete Weiblichkeit : homosexuell empfindende Frauen verstehen Brunnen-Verlag, 2005, ISBN 3-7655-1348-2

=== Articles ===
- Christl Ruth Vonholdt: The Deconstruction Of Marriage and Family
- Christl Ruth Vonholdt: Eine Frage des Menschenbildes – Warum Homosexualität Sünde ist. In: Zeitzeichen 6 (2005), p. 33-34 (German)
