= Scientology in Russia =

Scientology has been subjected to considerable regulation in Russia including having books prohibited, and branches forcibly closed.

== Church of Scientology Moscow v. Russia ==
In April 2007, the European Court of Human Rights ruled against Russia for repeatedly refusing to consider the Moscow Church of Scientology's application for the status of a legally valid religious association. The court found that the reasons given to deny re-registration of the church by the justice department and endorsed by the Moscow courts had no legal basis.

== Other events ==
In July 2007, the St. Petersburg City Court ordered that the city's Scientology center be closed for violating its charter by engaging in unlicensed health care services. A court in Samara came to a similar decision in November 2008, closing down the activities of the local center for practicing without a license.

In September 2009, the European Court of Human Rights issued a binding ruling in favor of two Scientology branches in Surgut and Nizhnekamsk, which had been denied registration as "religious organizations." The two organizations were awarded 20,000 € in costs and damages. The ruling, which cannot be appealed, said that Russia could not ban the Church of Scientology simply because it did not have a long history in the country.

In December 2009, the court closed the Dianetics Center in Naberezhnye Chelny.

In 2010, some of the works of L. Ron Hubbard were included into Russia's Federal List of banned extremist materials, and removed on 3 May 2011. Another such attempt was made by prosecutor in mid-2011 and was unsuccessful.

In November 2015, the activities of the Church of Scientology Moscow were banned by the Moscow city court, an action which was supported by the Supreme Court in June 2016. Two reasons stand for this lengthened struggle between the Church of Scientology and the Russian ministry of justice, first is that the Russian Orthodox Church views CoS as a "destructive organization." The ROC is split between two contradicting opinions, first that "Scientology is a dangerous heretical sect," and the others say it is not a religion and is "purely commercial." One reason for this position is that the Church of Scientology's name is a United States Trademark and therefore cannot be religious.

In 2016 and 2019, police raided the Moscow and St. Petersburg branches and made several arrests.

In June 2017, leaders of the Church of Scientology in St. Petersburg were arrested, charged with "participation in an 'extremist' community, incitement of hatred, and illegal business activities." According to Falikov, the accusations have no real basis. As for the accusations of illegal business activities, the Church of Scientology is made up of two branches, one a religious community "with no right to carry on a commercial activity, and the other a commercial branch, which sells books," Falikov writes. He calls the accusations an "instrument of suppression." He also mentioned that those arrested won a case against the European Court when their church branch was banned.

In September 2018, the United States Commission on International Religious Freedom adopted the case of imprisoned Russian Scientologist Ivan Matsitsky, calling him a "prisoner of conscience." Matsitsky had been imprisoned on June 5, 2017, after a raid on a Church of Scientology in St. Petersburg. Matsitsky's case was adopted along with that of another religious worker imprisoned in Russia, Jehovah's Witness Dennis Christensen. On their imprisonment, Vice Chair of the USCIRF Kristina Arriaga stated, "These two cases are examples of the Russian government 'securitizing' religion—targeting religious communities it considers illegitimate on the pretext that they pose a national security threat."

In 2021, Russia labelled World Institute of Scientology Enterprises and Church of Spiritual Technology "undesirable organizations" after finding that they "pose a threat to the security of the Russian Federation."

== See also ==
- Scientology status by country § Russia
- Scientology and law § Russia
- Religion in Russia
