= Alan Cowell =

British journalist (born 1947)

- Born: 16 March 1947 (age 79)
- Occupations: journalist, novelist
- Notable credit(s): The New York Times, A Walking Guide (novel)
- Spouse(s): Christiane Cowell, Susan Cullinan
- Children: Sarah, Rebecca and Amanda

Alan S. Cowell (born 16 March 1947) is a British journalist and a former foreign correspondent for The New York Times.

== Career ==
Between 2008 and 2013 Cowell was a Senior Correspondent for NYTimes.com based in Paris. In March 2015, he left the staff of The New York Times but continued as a freelance contributor. He has also written for The Times of London.

Cowell began his journalism career as a reporter for British newspapers: The Lancashire Evening Post and The Cambridge News before becoming a news writer/reader at the Swiss Broadcasting Corporation, in Bern, Switzerland, in 1971. He joined Reuters in 1972 as a reporter based in Bonn and The New York Times in 1981. His reporting has covered primarily the Middle East, Africa and Europe. During a period of time based in Rome, he also covered the Vatican and was a member of the traveling press accompanying Pope John Paul II in Latin America, the United States, Australia and elsewhere. During a 43-year career as a foreign correspondent, Cowell worked from news bureaux in Germany, Turkey, Zambia, Zimbabwe, Kenya, South Africa, Greece, Egypt, Italy, France and the United Kingdom. At Reuters, during the days immediately preceding Zimbabwe's independence in 1980, he was the last reporter known to have filed stories by carrier pigeon. In 1985 he was awarded the George Polk Award for Foreign Reporting in recognition of his coverage of South Africa, whence he was expelled in 1987. He is currently based in London, where he has covered major stories including the 2006 killing of Alexander V. Litvinenko, a former K.G.B. officer poisoned with the rare radioactive isotope, Polonium 210, which is the subject of his book The Terminal Spy. His works of fiction have been set in locations including the English Lake District, Paris and South Africa.

== Bibliography ==
- Cat Flap: A Novel. New York: St. Martin's Press, 2018. ISBN 978-1-250-14651-9
- A Walking Guide: A Novel. New York: Simon & Schuster, 2003. ISBN 0-7432-4470-2 ISBN 978-0-7432-4470-1
- Killing the Wizards: Wars of Power and Freedom from Zaire to South Africa. Simon & Schuster 1992. ISBN 0-671-69629-7
- Why Are They Weeping? South Africans under Apartheid (with David Turnley). Stewart, Tabori and Chang 1988. ISBN 1-55670-044-X
- The Terminal Spy: A True Story of Espionage, Betrayal, and Murder. Doubleday 2008. ISBN 978-0-385-52355-4 (US); 9780385614153 (UK)
- The Paris Correspondent: A Novel. New York: The Overlook Press, 2011. ISBN 978-1-59020-671-3 (US)
- Permanent Removal: A Novel. Johannesburg: Jacana Media, 2016. ISBN 978-1-4314-2343-9
