= Reichenberg Fellowship =

German non-denominational ecumenical community

The Reichenberg Fellowship is a ecumenical Christian community based in Germany. In German it is called the Offensive Junger Christen (OJC) e.V.. It belongs to the EKD and is situated in Reichelsheim in the Odenwald and in Greifswald.

== History ==
The community was founded by Irmela and Horst-Klaus Hofmann as a contrast movement to the Protests of 1968. Horst-Klaus Hofmann was executive secretary of the YMCA-Mannheim and held Christian youth meetings in the offices of the Evangelical Sisterhood of Mary in Darmstadt. They invited students to share their family life in their home in Bensheim, Odenwald. The family grew to an extended family and subsequently to a Christian community. They moved to Reichelsheim, Odenwald and bought the Reichenberg castle.

Since 1999 the community defines itself as ecumenical.

== Organization ==
The community is led by Prior Konstantin Mascher and consists of about 42 full members.

The Reichenberg Fellowship is member of the EKD charity organization Diakonie and of the German Association of Youth Missionary Movements. The “Reichelsheim European Youth Center” is Chapter of YMCA.

The German Institute for Youth and Society, (Deutsches Institut für Jugend und Gesellschaft (DIJG)) is the OJC's center for study and research. Director was Christl Ruth Vonholdt. Arthur A. Goldberg is one of its advisory council members.

The Reichenberg Fellowship operates mainly on donations.

== Basic activities ==
The Fellowship exists of

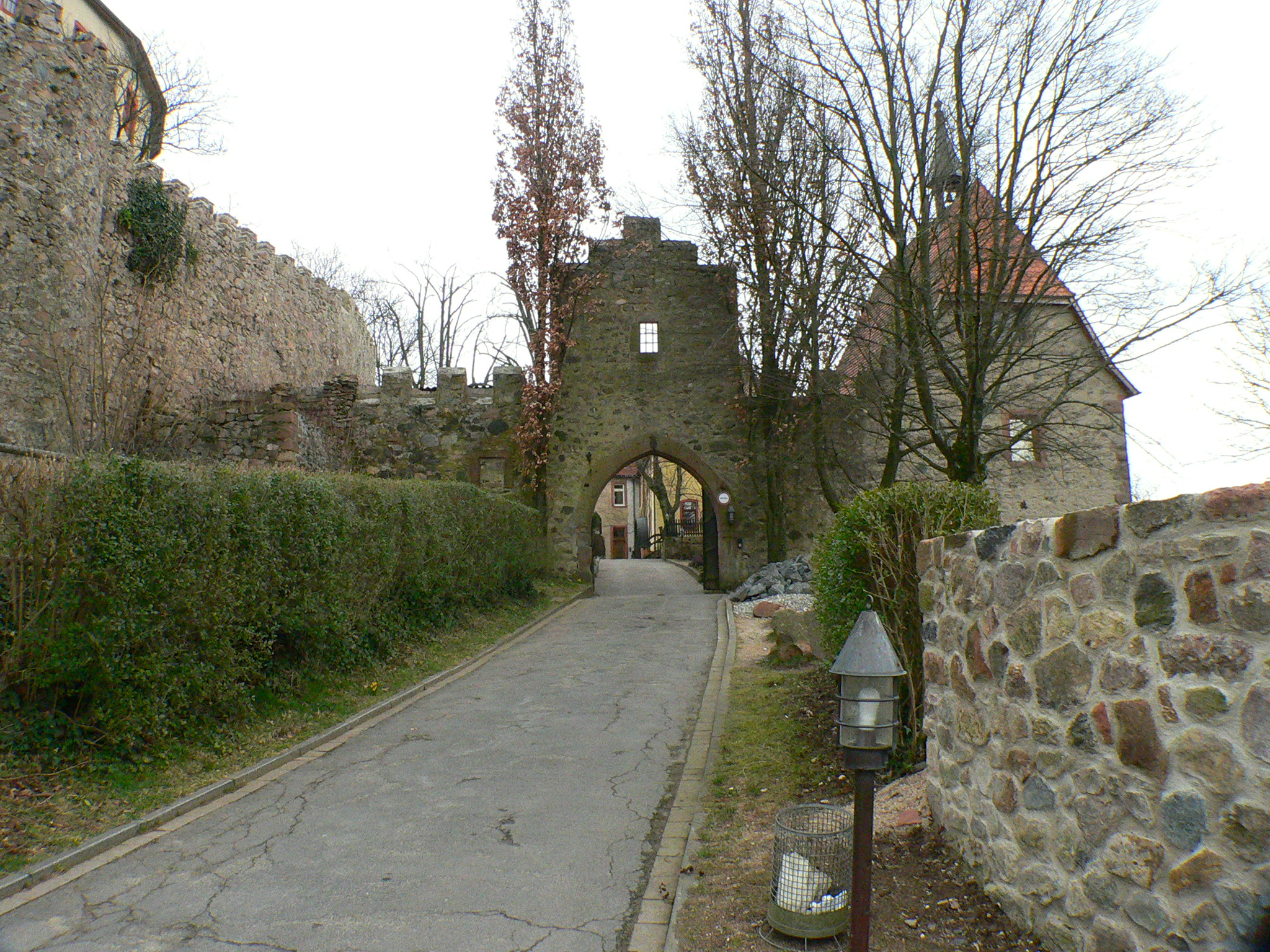
Entrance of Reichenberg Castle with St. Michael's Chapel on the right

- Reichenberg Castle with
  - field of experience,
  - Schlosscafé and
  - the gothic St. Michael's Chapel,
- the Reichelsheim European Youth Center (REZ) with local and regional YMCA-Youth Work and international youth conferences consisting of
  - the program pub ″Jig″
  - a youth hostel
  - trips and camps
- the Wellhouse (Quellhaus), with two families and four singles building a residential community
- the Felsengrund multigenerational house
- the seminar for biblical counselling with
  - counselling training,
  - the journal Brennpunkt Seelsorge for Pastoral care
  - lectures
- the German Institute for Youth and Society (Deutsches Institut für Jugend und Gesellschaft, abbreviated DIJG) with scientific studies and publications, the journal "Bulletin" and
- the OJC community in Greifswald with the Biblical counselling action committee, conferences and community ministries
- a library

=== International activities ===
The supporting non-profit association today has outreach ministries in Argentina, Bosnia and Herzegovina, Russia, Iraq, Congo, Mexico, Pakistan, the Philippines, Fidschi and Honduras in development cooperation as NGO.

Since 1993, the Reichenberg Fellowship has led international building camps in Germany, Macedonia, Croatia and Russia. The young people between the ages of 16 and 26 have had the opportunity to work with others of different nationality, confession and language.

=== German Institute for Youth and Society ===
The German Institute for Youth and Society (Deutsches Institut für Jugend und Gesellschaft) was led by Christl Ruth Vonholdt; this position is presently vacant. The institute is the apologetic branch of the Reichenberg Fellowship. It publishes its own research and translates English publications into German.

The institute cooperates with the following organisations:

- American Anglican Council, Washington, D.C., US
- Institut ekumenických studií v Praze, Prague, Czech Republic
- Institute on Religion and Democracy, Washington, D.C., US
- Odwaga, Lublin, Polen (R.C., relating to Catholic writings and Richard Cohen)
- Oxford Centre for Mission Studies, Oxford, U.K.
- The Alliance for Therapeutic Choice and Scientific Integrity (ATCSI), US

=== Publishing activities ===
The OJC publishes the journals Salzkorn. Anstiftung zum gemeinsamen Christenleben ("Grain of Salt", for friends and supporters, 4 times a year), Brennpunkt Seelsorge. Beiträge zur biblischen Lebensberatung ("Focus: Counselling" 2 times a year).

Members of the community including Irmela Hofmann, Horst-Klaus Hofmann, Christl Ruth Vonholdt, Klaus Sperr, Ute and Frank Paul have also published several books themselves.

- Differentielle Wirkungen der Praxis der Transzendentalen Meditation (TM) - Eine empirische Analyse pathogener Strukturen als Hilfe für die Beratung. Bensheim 1980, Selbstverlag
- Translation of: D. Mitchell Whitman: Brecht das Schweigen. Sexuelle Gewalt gegen Kinder. Titel der amerikanischen Originalausgabe: Child sexual abuse. An overview and teaching manual for clergy and other Christian leaders. Neukirchen-Vluyn 1993, ISBN 3-7615-4871-0
- Offensive Junger Christen: Homosexualität und christliche Seelsorge. Dokumentation eines ökumenischen Symposiums. Veranstaltet vom Deutschen Institut für Jugend und Gesellschaft (OJC), Reichelsheim. Offensive Junger Christen/Aussaat Verlag, Neukirchen-Vluyn 1995, ISBN 3-7615-4911-3
- Christl Ruth Vonholdt (Ed.): Striving for Gender Identity: Homosexuals and Christian Counseling. A workbook for the Church. Reichelsheim 1996, Selbstverlag
- Ralph Pechmann und Martin Reppenhagen (Hrsg.): Mission im Widerspruch. Religionstheologische Fragen heute und Mission morgen. Eine Veröffentlichung des Deutschen Instituts für Jugend und Gesellschaft. Neukirchen-Vluyn 1999, ISBN 3-7887-1770-X
- Ralph Pechmann und Martin Reppenhagen (Hrsg.): Zeugnis im Dialog der Religionen und der Postmoderne. Eine Veröffentlichung des Deutschen Instituts für Jugend und Gesellschaft. Neukirchen-Vluyn 1999, ISBN 3-7887-1769-6
- Ute und Frank Paul: Begleiten statt erobern. Missionare als Gäste im nordargentinischen Chaco. Neufeld-Verlag 2010
- Klaus Sperr: Herzschlag. Anstöße zu den Wochensprüchen des Kirchenjahres. fontis-Verlag 2014
- Ute Paul: Die Rückkehr der Zikade. Vom Leben am anderen Ende der Welt. Neufeld-Verlag 2015

== Sources ==
- general
- German Institute for Youth and Society
