= Church of Scientology Moscow v. Russia =

European Court of Human Rights case

Decided 5 April 2007
- Full case name: Church of Scientology Moscow v Russia
- Case: 18147/02
- ECLI: ECLI:CE:ECHR:2007:0405JUD001814702
- Chamber: First Section

Court composition
- President; C.L. Rozakis
- Judges: L. Loucaides; N. Vajić; A. Kovler; E. Steiner; K. Hajiyev; D. Spielmann

The Church of Scientology Moscow v Russia [2007] ECHR 258 is a European Court of Human Rights case, concerning Article 11 of the convention. In the case the European Court of Human Rights in Strasbourg condemned Moscow City Government's refusal to consider the Church of Scientology of Moscow for registration as a religious organisation, and as a result found that Russia had violated the rights of the Church of Scientology under Articles 11 (the right to freedom of association) when "read in the light of Article 9" (the right to freedom of religion). Specifically, the Court determined that, in denying consideration of registration to the Church of Scientology of Moscow, the Moscow authorities "did not act in good faith and neglected their duty of neutrality and impartiality vis-à-vis the applicant's religious community". The Court also awarded the Church €10,000 in respect of non-pecuniary damage and €15,000 for costs and expenses.

== Facts ==
The Church of Scientology of Moscow describes itself as a religious association and was officially registered as such in January 1994. On 1 October 1997, a new Law on Freedom of Conscience and Religious Associations (Religion Law) entered into force, requiring all religious associations previously granted the status of a legal entity to bring their articles of association into conformity with the Religion Law and to re-apply for registration with the competent Justice Department before 31 December 2000. Failure to obtain "re-registration" before the expiration of that time limit exposed the Church (Note: Use of "Church" or "the Church" is a common shortened form of "Church of Scientology"; see The Church (Scientology).) to the threat of dissolution by judicial decision.

The Church of Scientology of Moscow subsequently applied eleven times for re-registration to the Moscow Justice Department between August 1998 and May 2005. Each application was rejected. The first two applications were refused on the grounds that the Church had violated unspecified laws. The third to fifth applications were refused on the grounds that the Church had failed to submit unspecified documents. The sixth to tenth applications were refused on the grounds that the Church had failed to comply with the time limit for re-registration, although the Constitutional Court had already held that this reason was not valid. Finally, the eleventh application was refused on the ground that the Church had failed to prove its existence in Moscow for at least 15 years, although the Constitutional Court had already held that this reason was not valid.

The refusal to re-register the Moscow Church under the Religion Law placed its status as a legal entity in jeopardy. The consequences of non-registration as a religious organization within the meaning of the Law were extreme for the Church and its members. As a result of the arbitrary refusal to re-register, the rights of the Church and its parishioners essential to the conduct of their religious activities on anything but the most primitive level were seriously jeopardized, including the ability to own and operate educational institutions including theological schools, to own and maintain religious buildings, to conduct charitable activities, the right to acquire, import and distribute religious literature and the right to invite foreign citizens to preach and conduct religious services.

As a result of a complaint filed by the Church, the Nikulinskiy District Court of Moscow found, on 8 December 2000, that the Justice's Department refusal to re-register the Church was unlawful. It concluded that the Justice Department had, in essence, used subterfuge to avoid re-registration of the Church and pointed out that an association with no status as a legal entity was, in particular, prevented from renting premises for religious ceremonies and worship, receiving and disseminating religious literature or holding a bank account. It also held that that refusal had been inconsistent with international standards of law. That decision became binding and enforceable on 19 December 2000. However, the Justice Department refused to comply with it and, in March 2001, it was quashed by way of supervisory review by the government. Subsequently, the Russian courts upheld the systematic refusal to register the Moscow Church. The Church then filed an application with the European Court in 2002.

== Judgment ==
In its decision overturning the refusal by Russian authorities to re-register the Church, the Human Rights Court determined that the Church of Scientology of Moscow was a "religious community" entitled to the rights afforded such communities by ECHR Article 9, which protects the right to freedom of religion or belief. The Court held that where the organization of a religious community is at issue, "a refusal to recognize it" not only constitutes interference with its right to freedom of association protected by ECHR Article 11. It also constitutes interference with the applicants' right to freedom of religion under Article 9 of the convention. The Court noted that "the believers' right to freedom of religion encompasses the expectation that the community will be allowed to function peacefully, free from arbitrary State intervention". Therefore, the Court determined that the failure to recognize the Church of Scientology through rejection of registration offended these fundamental religious freedom and association rights.

== Significance ==
The Court refers to its settled case-law to the effect that, as enshrined in Article 9, freedom of thought, conscience and religion is one of the foundations of a "democratic society" within the meaning of the Convention. It is, in its religious dimension, one of the most vital elements that go to make up the identity of believers and their conception of life, but it is also a precious asset for atheists, agnostics, sceptics and the unconcerned. The pluralism indissociable from a democratic society, which has been dearly won over the centuries, depends on it.

This expansive approach is consistent with the Court's application of a fundamental human rights policy of the Council of Europe to religious freedom issues – "the need to secure true religious pluralism, an inherent feature of the notion of a democratic society". Similarly, the Court has emphasized the importance of "pluralism, tolerance and broadmindedness, without which there is no democratic society". As the Court has stressed,

While religious freedom is primarily a matter of individual conscience, it also implies, inter alia, freedom to "manifest [one's] religion" alone and in private or in community with others, in public and within the circle of those whose faith one shares. Since religious communities traditionally exist in the form of organized structures, Article 9 must be interpreted in the light of Article 11 of the Convention, which safeguards associative life against unjustified State interference. Seen in that perspective, the right of believers to freedom of religion, which includes the right to manifest one's religion in community with others, encompasses the expectation that believers will be allowed to associate freely, without arbitrary State intervention. Indeed, the autonomous existence of religious communities is indispensable for pluralism in a democratic society and is thus an issue at the very heart of the protection which Article 9 affords. The State's duty of neutrality and impartiality, as defined in the Court's case-law, is incompatible with any power on the State's part to assess the legitimacy of religious beliefs.

The Court then dismissed the government's claims that the refusal to register the Moscow Church of Scientology did not constitute a violation of the Church's fundamental human rights as it was not dissolved and could continue to operate. Instead, the Court applied its findings in Moscow Branch of The Salvation Army v. Russia case to find that the Moscow Church of Scientology was being prevented from exercising its full range of religious activities.

The Court has already found in a similar case that this situation disclosed an interference with the religious organization's right to freedom of association and also with its right to freedom of religion insofar as the Religions Act restricted the ability of a religious association without legal-entity status to exercise the full range of religious activities (see The Moscow Branch of The Salvation Army v. Russia). These findings are applicable in the present case as well.

Likewise, the Court found that the government's actions constituted an interference with the Church of Scientology's rights to freedom of association and religion.

The Court has expressed the view that a refusal by the domestic authorities to grant legal-entity status to an association of individuals may amount to an interference with the applicants' exercise of their right to freedom of association. Where the organization of the religious community is at issue, a refusal to recognize it also constitutes interference with the applicants' right to freedom of religion under Article 9 of the Convention. The believers' right to freedom of religion encompasses the expectation that the community will be allowed to function peacefully, free from arbitrary State intervention.

The Court then concluded by stating that

[I]n view of the Court's finding above that the reasons invoked by the Moscow Justice Department and endorsed by the Moscow courts to deny re-registration of the applicant branch had no legal basis, it can be inferred that, in denying registration to the Church of Scientology of Moscow, the Moscow authorities did not act in good faith and neglected their duty of neutrality and impartiality vis-à-vis the applicant's religious community. In the light of the foregoing, the Court considers that the interference with the applicant's right to freedom of religion and association was not justified. There has therefore been a violation of Article 11 of the Convention read in the light of Article 9.

This is not the first time that the Strasbourg organs have ruled in favor of Scientology. The Church of Scientology has previously been before the European Commission on Human Rights in a case that decided that a Church could represent its members to assert their religious rights under Article 9 (see X and Church of Scientology v. Sweden 16 DR 109 [Ecom HR 1979]). The Commission concluded that the Church of Scientology, as "a Church body is capable of possessing and exercising the rights contained in Article 9(1) in its own capacity as a representative of its members."

Moreover, on 9 June 2005, the European Court of Human Rights (First Section) issued an important admissibility decision concerning issues relating to the registration of two Scientology Churches as a religious organization under Russian national law. In that case, Kimlya, Aidar Sultanov and Church of Scientology of Nizhnekamsk vs Russia (Application nos. 76836/01 and 32782/03), the Court considered separate applications regarding the refusal of Russian authorities to register Scientology Churches as religious organizations filed by founding members of two Churches of Scientology, the Church of Scientology of Surgut City in the Khanty-Mansi Autonomous Region of the Russian Federation, and the Church of Scientology of Nizhnekamsk in the Tatarstan Republic of the Russian Federation.

In its admissibility decision, the European Court of Human Rights determined, after examining extensive submissions and arguments by the parties, that the founding members' and the Church's complaint regarding the refusal of Russian authorities to re-register it was admissible.

The Court considers, in the light of the parties' submissions, that this part of the applications raises serious issues of fact and law under the Convention, the determination of which requires an examination of the merits.

In September 2009, the European Court of Human Rights issued a binding ruling in favor of the Scientology branches in Surgut and Nizhnekamsk. The two organizations were awarded €20,000 in costs and damages. The ruling, which cannot be appealed, said that Russia could not ban the Church of Scientology simply because it did not have a long history in the country.

The Scientology Working Group of the City of Hamburg posted comments on the city's website, in English, containing its assessment of the judgment and its implications.

The Working group commented, "The ECHR itself did not consider whether the Scientology organisation as such meets the characteristics of a religion (or religious community) within the meaning of article 9 of the European Convention on Human Rights in terms of its structure and beliefs. The Court based its ruling merely on the specifically Russian and consequently national assessment of the 'Church of Scientology Moscow' being an association of a religious nature, without positively according the Scientology organisation as a whole the status of a religious community." The task force concluded that the ECHR did not grant the Church a "positive entitlement" to registration as a religious entity in Russia nor did it make a ruling on the religious nature of Scientology that would be binding on ECHR signatories other than Russia.

In view of the judgment the European Human Rights Office of the Church of Scientology International emphasized a "need for dialogue" with governments.

== See also ==
- Scientology and law § Russia
- Scientology status by country § Russia
- Scientology in Russia
