= Gerhard Besier =

German historian, theologian and politician

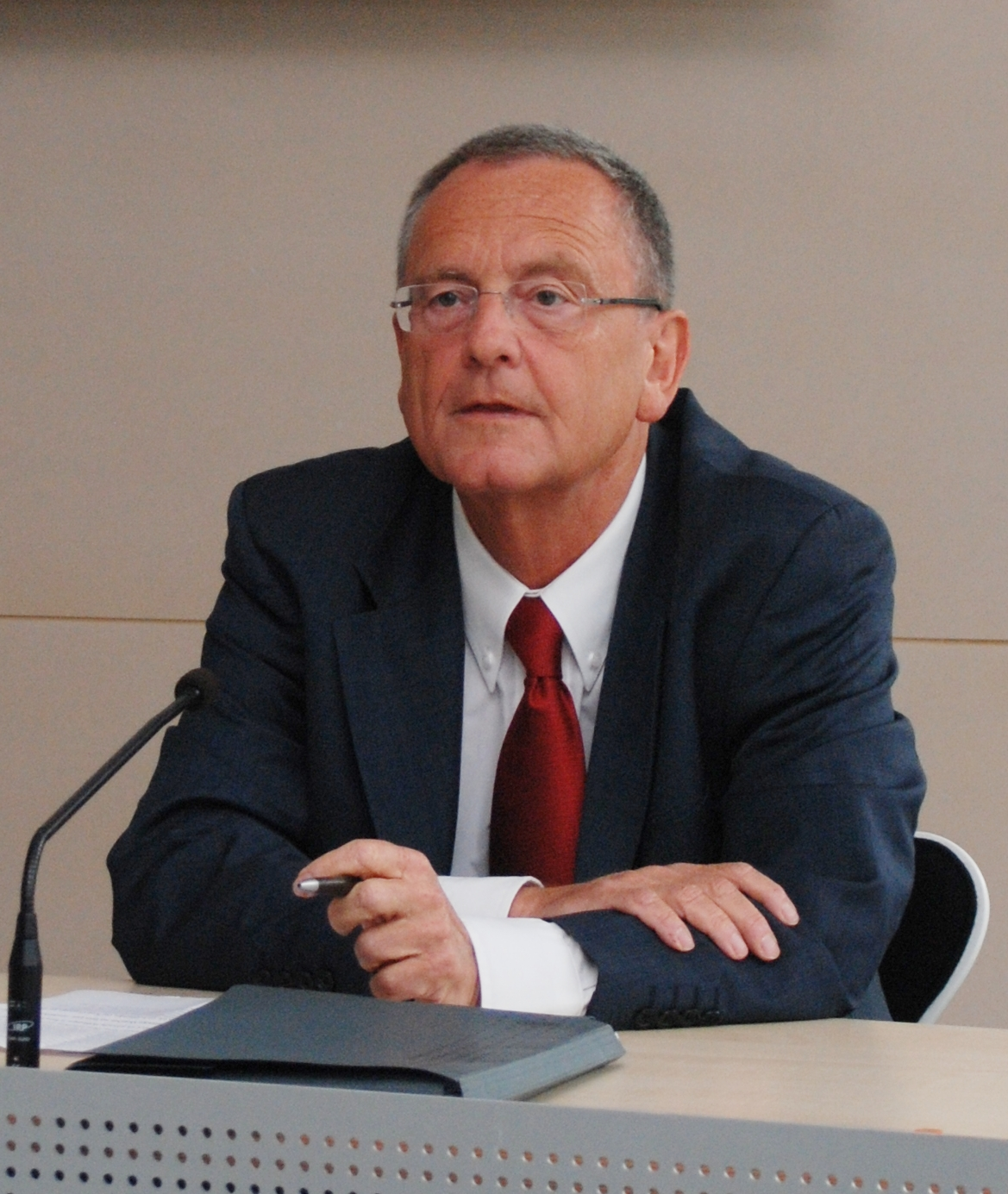
- Besier in June 2009
- Born: 30 November 1947 (age 78); Wiesbaden, Germany
- Known for: Writings on totalitarianism, church history and religious and ethnic minorities
- Awards: Honorary doctorate, Lund University
- Scientific career
- Workplaces: Dresden University of Technology

Gerhard Adolf Besier (born 30 November 1947, in Wiesbaden) is a German Lutheran theologian, historian and politician best known for his work on church-state relations in the Third Reich and in the German Democratic Republic.

== Work ==
Besier's publications have focused on church history, including church history during the Third Reich and the German Democratic Republic, and religious freedom issues in contemporary society. His views on religious freedom follow the libertarian American model, a stance which has made him controversial in Germany.

Besier taught historical theology at Heidelberg University from 1992 to 2003. From 2003 to 2008, he was the director of the Hannah Arendt Institute for Research on Totalitarianism at Dresden University; his contract was not renewed following widespread criticism in Germany of his liberal views on Scientology. Besier currently holds the chair in European Studies at Dresden University. He is a visiting professor at universities in the United States, Sweden and Poland, and is the editor of Kirchliche Zeitgeschichte, an academic journal on church history.

Besier holds three doctorates, including an honorary doctorate from Lund University in recognition of his services to religious freedom.

Formerly considered close to the conservative Christian Democratic Union party, Besier joined the left-wing Die Linke party in April 2009, and was nominated for a safe Landtag seat in Saxony.

== Publications ==
=== English ===
- Churches, Southern Africa and the Political Context. 1999, Minerva Press, ISBN 978-0-7541-0564-0.
- The Holy See and Hitler's Germany. 2007, Palgrave Macmillan, ISBN 1-4039-8831-5 (with Francesca Piombo).
- Fascism, Communism and the Consolidation of Democracy: A Comparison of European Dictatorships. 2007, Lit Verlag, ISBN 978-3-8258-9657-7 (with Francesca Piombo and Katarzyna Stokłosa).
- Religion, State and Society in the Transformations of the Twentieth Century – Modernization, Innovation and Decline. 2008, Lit Verlag, ISBN 978-3-8258-0980-5.
- Totalitarianism and Liberty. Hannah Arendt in the 21st Century. Kraków 2008, Ksiegarnia Akademicka, ISBN 978-83-7188-057-5 (with Katarzyna Stokłosa and Andrew Wisley)
- Jehovah's Witnesses in Europe: Past and Present, Volume I, Cambridge Scholars Publishing, 2016, ISBN 978-1-4438-9726-6 (with Katarzyna Stokłosa)
- Jehovah's Witnesses in Europe: Past and Present, Volume II, Cambridge Scholars Publishing, 2018, ISBN 978-1-5275-0409-7 (with Katarzyna Stokłosa)

=== German ===
- Seelsorge und Klinische Psychologie. Defizite in Theorie und Praxis der Pastoralpsychologie. Göttingen 1980, ISBN 3-525-62182-5
- Preußische Kirchenpolitik in der Bismarckära. 1980.
- Protestantische Kirchen Europas im Ersten Weltkrieg. 1984.
- Der SED-Staat und die Kirche. Der Weg in die Anpassung. Munich 1993, ISBN 3-570-02080-0
- Der SED-Staat und die Kirche 1969–1990. Die Vision vom „dritten Weg“. Berlin and Frankfurt am Main 1995, ISBN 3-549-05454-8
- Der SED-Staat und die Kirche 1983–1991. Höhenflug und Absturz. Berlin and Frankfurt am Main 1995, ISBN 3-549-05455-6
- Christliche Hoffnung, Weltoffenheit, Gemeinsames Leben. Gelbe Mammuts auf dem Berg. Brunnen, 1998 (with Christl Ruth Vonholdt and Hermann Klenk)
- Die neuen Inquisitoren. Religionsfreiheit und Glaubensneid. Zurich 1999, Teil 1: ISBN 3-7201-5277-4, Teil 2: ISBN 3-7201-5278-2
- Die Rufmordkampagne. Kirchen & Co vor Gericht. Bergisch Gladbach 2002, ISBN 3-929351-19-6
- Konzern Kirche. Das Evangelium und die Macht des Geldes. Hänssler Verlag, 2002, ISBN 3-7751-2858-1
- Repression und Selbstbehauptung. Die Zeugen Jehovas unter der NS- und der SED-Diktatur, Duncker und Humblot, Berlin 2003, ISBN 978-3-428-10605-9 (with Clemens Vollnhals)
- Der Heilige Stuhl und Hitler-Deutschland: Die Faszination des Totalitären. Munich 2004, ISBN 3-421-05814-8
- Religionsfreiheit und Konformismus. Über Minderheiten und die Macht der Mehrheit. Lit. Verlag, Münster 2004, ISBN 3-8258-7654-3
- Das Europa der Diktaturen. Eine neue Geschichte des 20. Jahrhunderts. Deutsche Verlags-Anstalt, Munich 2006, ISBN 3-421-05877-6
- Im Namen der Freiheit. Die amerikanische Mission. Vandenhoeck & Ruprecht, Göttingen 2006, ISBN 978-3-525-36734-6
- Jehovas Zeugen in Europa – Geschichte und Gegenwart, Band 1, Lit Verlag, Münster 2013, ISBN 978-3-643-11508-9 (with Katarzyna Stokłosa)
- Jehovas Zeugen in Europa – Geschichte und Gegenwart, Band 2, Lit Verlag, Münster 2015, ISBN 978-3-643-13039-6 (with Katarzyna Stokłosa)
