= Scientology in the Netherlands =

The Church of Scientology has been active in the Netherlands since 1972, opening its first church in Amsterdam in 1974.

The amount of active Scientologists in the Netherlands is not definitively known, but media sources estimate membership to be around 100-200 active members as of 2015.

== History ==
In 2008 as part of Project Chanology, members of Anonymous, attempting to target the digital infrastructure of the church, instead accidentally initiated a cyberattack against a Dutch primary school. In the same year, the church applied to the Dutch Tax and Customs Administration for recognition as a public benefit organization, which would give the church and its donors certain tax benefits.

In 2015, the Church attracted controversy when an undercover journalist from De Volkskrant allegedly received an auditing session from an 11-year-old boy.

In 2016, the Supreme Court of the Netherlands ruled that the church and its services offered were operated for commercial purposes, thereby denying their petition for recognition as a public benefit organization.

On October 28, 2017, a new church was opened in Amsterdam with a private ceremony attended by church leader David Miscavige. The church had purchased the property in Amsterdam for approximately €5 million in 2013.

In August 2022, the Dutch government officially recognized Scientology as a religious public benefit organization, reversing earlier court decisions. It was determined by the Dutch Tax and Customs Administration that the activities and practices of the church were of a religious nature and thereby served a public benefit as related to taxation.

== Church of Spiritual Technology et al. v. Dataweb B.V. et al. ==
In 1995, confidential Scientology documents were released onto the internet, among them documents describing operating thetans, information usually released only to high-ranking church members. That same year, Karin Spaink, a Dutch journalist, published some of these documents on her personal website. The following year, Spaink removed the documents from her website and replaced them with articles which contained quotes and citations from the confidential documents. The Church of Scientology initiated a lawsuit against Spaink and Dutch internet providers responsible for hosting her website, claiming copyright infringement. The lawsuit was ultimately dismissed in favor of the respondents, with the Dutch court establishing that the publishing of quotations from the documents constituted fair use, and thereby did not constitute copyright infringement.

== See also ==
- Scientology status by country § Netherlands
