= Scientology and the Nation of Islam =

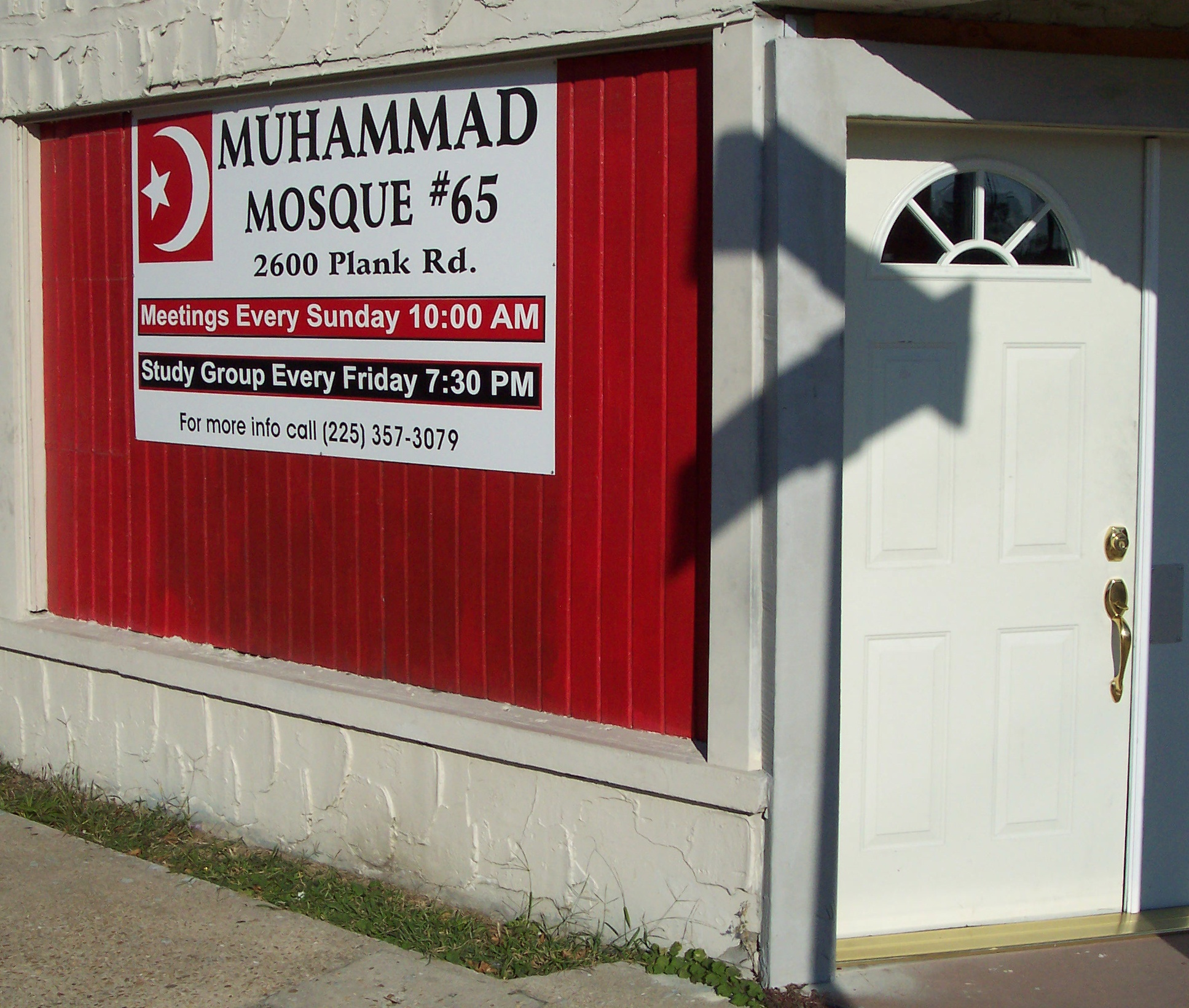
A Church of Scientology mission (left) and a Nation of Islam mosque (right)

Since the mid-2000s, the Nation of Islam has maintained ties with the Church of Scientology. NOI leader Louis Farrakhan encourages NOI members to study Dianetics and train as Dianetic auditors. According to the NOI, more than a thousand of its members had been certified as auditors, and Dianetic auditing has become an established feature of NOI mosque life, including graduation ceremonies at annual Saviours' Day conventions.

The partnership has attracted attention because the two groups differ sharply in membership, theology, and public image. Critics, including former Scientologists, former NOI members, journalists, and the Southern Poverty Law Center, have questioned the motives behind the alliance and its financial arrangements, and have criticized the Church of Scientology for partnering with an organization accused of antisemitism. Farrakhan has denied that he has profited personally from the partnership.

== Background ==
The Nation of Islam was founded in the United States in 1930 by Wallace Fard Muhammad. After the death of his successor Elijah Muhammad in 1975, the organization divided; members who wished to retain Elijah Muhammad's teachings re-established the NOI in the late 1970s under Louis Farrakhan, who has led the organization since.

Scientology emerged from the 1950 best-selling book, Dianetics: The Modern Science of Mental Health, by L. Ron Hubbard. The core and main practice of Dianetics, auditing, is a one-on-one counseling procedure in which a trained auditor guides a person through painful memories; auditing and other Scientology training courses and services are administered to members, typically for a fee.

Scholars of religion classify both the Church of Scientology and the Nation of Islam as new religious movements.

== History ==
Accounts differ as to how Farrakhan first encountered Scientology. In a 2012 interview-based report, The New Republic noted Farrakhan said he first heard of Scientology decades earlier from a former NOI minister who had become a Scientologist. The Southern Poverty Law Center, citing ex-Scientology official Mark Rathbun, reported that the actor Isaac Hayes introduced Farrakhan to Scientology in the late 1990s through the World Literacy Crusade, a Scientology front group.

Tony Muhammad, NOI's West Coast regional representative and a Scientologist, has claimed he introduced Farrakhan to Scientology in 2005, after finding the technique helpful in recovering from the psychological shock of a police arrest. In 2006, Farrakhan was one of four Black clergy honored at Scientology's "Ebony Awakening" awards. Muhammad has appeared in several Scientology promotional videos, and in 2017 he received an International Association of Scientologists Freedom Medal award. He was a guest of honor at the opening of the first Church of Scientology in Ireland in 2017. In 2020, after more than a decade as a Scientologist, Muhammad attained the state of "Clear": a coveted status in the Church of Scientology. Reverend Alfreddie Johnson, with whom Muhammad holds joint events, is also a Scientologist.

In August 2010, hundreds of NOI members gathered in Rosemont, Illinois, near the NOI's headquarters, for a Dianetics seminar; Farrakhan also spoke to a small dinner audience at Scientology's Celebrity Centre in fall 2010.

In October 2014, in the aftermath of the killing of Michael Brown in Ferguson, Missouri, the NOI-founded "Stop the Killing" anti-violence campaign distributed material from The Way to Happiness, a Scientology-sponsored moral-guidance program. An NOI representative said the effort was not meant to promote the church; the report also noted that the NOI claimed over a thousand trained auditors.

In his 2017 Saviours' Day keynote address in Detroit, Farrakhan referred to Scientology, and appeared to question the motives of Leah Remini, an actress and former Scientologist who had begun publicly criticizing the church. In 2018, the third season of Remini's A&E series, Leah Remini: Scientology and the Aftermath, devoted an episode, "Unlikely Pairing," to the relationship between Scientology and the Nation of Islam; in the episode, which featured interviews with former NOI members, she claimed she had personally sponsored Scientology courses for Tony Muhammad before leaving the church. That year, NOI members also reportedly held a blessing and naming ceremony for Tony Muhammad at Scientology's Flag Land Base in Clearwater, Florida.

== Rationale ==
The New Republic suggested that NOI's endorsement of Dianetics came at a time when Scientology's leadership wanted to recruit Black members.

== Financial allegations and denials ==
Former members of both the Church of Scientology and NOI have alleged financial incentives on both sides. Former Scientology staff told The New Republic that the church waived or reduced costs for some NOI members, and have alleged that Farrakhan collects commissions on fees paid by NOI members for Scientology auditing and courses. Farrakhan has denied taking money from Scientology or Dianetics, saying in a 2017 speech that he could prove he had not received a dime. A scholarly study of his ministry likewise notes Farrakhan has consistently denied the allegations.

== Reception and criticism ==
Some Scientology beliefs and practices, particularly its stated belief in reincarnation, contrast strongly with core NOI teachings, a tension noted by scholars and journalists. Both movements have been characterized as sharing interest in extraterrestrial or "space opera" themes.

Critics, including the Southern Poverty Law Center and the Anti-Defamation League, have condemned the Church of Scientology for partnering with the NOI, despite the Church's public statements of support for Jewish communities.

Ishmael Bey, a former assistant NOI minister who left the group partly over the Scientology relationship, said the NOI has expanded beyond Dianetics, additionally offering Scientology's introductory self-improvement courses; he expressed concern about children in the NOI studying Dianetics. Journalist Tony Ortega wrote in 2017 that while more NOI members were doing Scientology services, there was not convincing evidence of an actual merger of the two organizations.

== See also ==
- Scientology and religious groups
