= Scientology and hypnosis =

Practices in Scientology make extensive use of techniques drawn from hypnosis. They are used in 'auditing' and in the Training Routines widely practiced within the Church of Scientology. Hypnosis, in this context, is defined as language and nonverbal communication employed to induce heightened responsiveness and suggestibility. The Church of Scientology denies that its practices involve hypnosis. The organization says that it will not permit individuals who say they have previously experienced hypnosis – as either a subject or practitioner – to participate in Scientology training, with the stated reasoning that there is a possibility of harm caused by the prior exposure to hypnosis.

== Hubbard's experience with hypnosis ==
Scientology founder L. Ron Hubbard was known to his associates in the late 1940s as a talented hypnotist. During this period, he worked in Hollywood posing as a swami. He used nitrous oxide and amphetamines with hypnosis. He credited hypnosis techniques with shaping his book Dianetics: The Modern Science of Mental Health. In a "Technical Bulletin" from Hubbard, he writes: "We can brainwash faster than the Russians (20 secs to total amnesia against three years to slightly confused loyalty)." The Church of Scientology states that Hubbard's experience with hypnosis led him to create Dianetics as an alternative means to solve man's problems.

== Hypnosis techniques in Scientology practice ==
In the original 1950 text of Dianetics, Hubbard advocates light trance or "reverie" techniques in Dianetic practice. He refers to hypnotism as a tool and an art, and states that "Dianetics and hypnotism can be combined"; he writes in the same work that hypnotism "is not used to any extent in Dianetic therapy". As he incorporated Dianetics into Scientology, as part of "a larger agenda of creating dependency and obedience in followers", he added a wide range of other hypnotic techniques. Volney Mathison, an early collaborator with Hubbard who designed the precursor machine to the e-meter, remarked in 1964, "I decry the doings of trivial fakers, such as Scientologists and the like, who glibly denounce hypnosis and then try covertly to use it in their phony systems".

In The Research & Discovery Series Volume 1, Hubbard writes that the 'auditor' "must be prepared to use hypnotism, he must know how it works, what he should do to make it function, how to regress a person in hypnotism and so on". However, Scientology 'auditors' have been said to lack adequate training in hypnosis: Jon Atack writes that they "share an ignorance of hypnotism with the general populace and simply parrot Hubbard’s calming assurance that 'auditing is not a form of hypnosis' or that 'auditing removes hypnosis'". Margery Wakefield, in her book Understanding Scientology, observes that the extremely repetitive questioning done during drills in Scientology 'auditing' is a form of hypnosis. These drills are sometimes done for several hours at a time, and Wakefield notes that this continues "until the preclear can do it without delay, without protest, without apathy, but with cheerfulness."

Scientology training routines are used in several introductory courses, including the 'Communication Course', the course most commonly sold to new recruits. The Training Routines are said to make extensive use of hypnotic methods to put the subject in an altered state. Participants are led to believe they are learning to communicate more effectively, but the Training Routines "ultimately aim to cultivate the Scientologist identity and altered perception of reality." With repeated practice, the Training Routines heighten suggestibility, making it easier for the behavior, thoughts and emotions of the participant to be shaped.

A 2010 article in Ynet quoted Dr. Alex Aviv, Chairman of the Advisory Committee on the Law of Hypnosis to the Israeli Ministry of Health as saying (in reference to Scientology), "they restore early memories, usually of traumas, when in some cases this is a false memory. When a patient 'remembers' a false event like that via a hypnotic process - the event can become real for him".

== Litigation ==
In 2002, a former member sued the Church of Scientology in Ireland for damages for psychological and psychiatric injury, conspiracy, misrepresentation and breach of constitutional rights. The case was heard at the High Court starting in February 2003. The case was expected to continue until May. In March, Peter Naish, an Oxford-trained clinical psychologist with a specialism in hypnosis, provided evidence that the former member appeared to have been hypnotized while undergoing an 'auditing' session. He stated that extracts from Dianetics read in court indicated that hypnosis was involved in 'auditing'. He said that it appeared hypnosis was being used as a vehicle and that material was being developed in an emotional context. Although the court had heard 31 days of testimony, just as Naish was about to resume his evidence, the Church of Scientology agreed to settle the case.

== Statements from the Church of Scientology ==
The Church of Scientology's official position on hypnosis is that it is a dangerous and undesirable practice. Whereas hypnotism's goal is to place a person in "a state of lessened awareness (i.e. trance)", Scientology's stated goal is to put people into the opposite state - one of higher awareness.

In his book The Creation of Human Ability, Hubbard denied the hypnotic nature of the processes and drills, writing about one of the 'sessions': "On duplication processes, somebody in the audience usually claims this is 'hypnotism,' for it runs out hypnotism. It induces no trances. People who think so simply don't know much about hypnotism."

== See also ==
- Scientology and the occult
- Training routines (Scientology)
