= Scientology and religious groups =

There are significant contradictions between Scientology and most religions, especially the major monotheistic religions. Scientology texts written by its inventor, L. Ron Hubbard, claim that it is fully compatible with all existing major world religions, and that it does not conflict with them or their religious practices. Members are not allowed to engage in other similar mental therapies or procedures, religious or otherwise.

== Religious compatibility ==
Scientology's claim of religious compatibility to entry-level Scientologists is soon modified by the additional teaching that the various levels of the spiritual process which can be reached through Scientology are more advanced than those attainable in religious traditions. The major monotheistic religions and Scientology share the claim of Universality of their belief system, which precludes compatibility in the view of most scholars. Critics point out that, within Scientology, "spiritual abilities" tends to be synonymous with "mystical powers" rather than with "inner peace." Hubbard himself cautioned against the unwise or improper use of powers in his book History of Man.

In its application for tax-exempt status in the United States, the Church of Scientology International states:

Although there is no policy or Scriptural mandate expressly requiring Scientologists to renounce other religious beliefs or membership in other churches, as a practical matter, Scientologists are expected to and do become fully devoted to Scientology to the exclusion of other faiths. As Scientologists, they are required to look only to Scientology Scriptures for the answers to the fundamental questions of their existence and to seek enlightenment only from Scientology.

The revealed beliefs in Scientology at higher levels become increasingly contradictory with the world's major religions. The concept of past lives in Scientology is at odds with Christianity and Islam. Beliefs concerning the origins and age of the Earth, the root of evil, and the nature of man make it impossible to uphold the beliefs of most religions while also being a Scientologist. Hubbard claimed that Islam resulted from an extraterrestrial memory implant, called the Emanator, of which the Kaaba is supposedly an artifact. Mainstream religions, in his view, had failed to realize their objectives: "It is all very well to idealize poverty and associate wisdom with begging bowls, or virtue with low estate. However, those who have done this (Buddhists, Christians, Communists, and other fanatics) have dead-ended or are dead-ending".

Hubbard had a basic skepticism about religious claims, even about the existence of God. In July 1950, upon addressing a child's queries about the existence of angels, he clearly showed that he was talking about something that didn't exist. In March 1954, he talked about mysticism, spiritualism, and "guardian angels and priests and all this sort of thing as the requirement to inquire from nothingness for direction". When referring to God, he mentions "taking orders from an indefinite nothingness". Dianetics does not mention God.

According to scholar Mikael Rothstein, just as Jesus is the sole object of religious devotion and source of salvation, and the church is seen as an "extension" of Jesus' divinity, "the entire fabric of Scientology is best understood as an expansion of the individual, L. Ron Hubbard, including the buildings currently emerge as physical manifestations of Scientological ideals and virtues".

== Buddhism and Hinduism ==
The Church of Scientology has capitalized on the religion's similarity to Buddhism to win followers in historically Buddhist-influenced countries like Taiwan.

Hubbard discussed Buddhism in an early 1952 lecture in London, speaking about Buddhist reincarnation stories, about the Christian God and other religious topics. While theologian Marco Frenschkowski claims that Hubbard may have been experimenting with ways Scientology is similar to Buddhism, some scholars such as Frank K. Flinn and Stephen A. Kent interpret the Scientology founder's "reverence for Buddhism as a rather awkward response to external pressure". Hubbard clarified that Scientology is not a neo-Buddhist group. Scientology and Buddhism differ in that in Scientology there is no concept of Nirvana. According to religious scholar Aldo Natale Terrin, in Buddhism, adherents aim to the suppression of the mind which is in direct opposition to the Scientologist idea of "transparency to himself". Flinn called Scientology technological Buddhism, however, it can be differentiated from Buddhist asceticism as its aim is not the eradication of pain through the removal of desire or detaching oneself from the world. Furthermore, it has nothing in common with Buddhist prayer offerings; it is not contemplative, but action-oriented and practical.

Hubbard sometimes identified himself with Maitreya (Metteya in Pali), a prophesied Buddha of the future. This identification is made most strongly in his 1955–1956 poem Hymn of Asia, which begins with the line "Am I Metteyya?" and emphasizes certain traits of Hubbard that the editors of the publication said matched traits predicted by the "Metteya Legend", such as Metteya appearing in the West, having golden hair or red hair (Hubbard was red-haired), and appearing in a time of world peril, with the earliest of the predicted dates for his return being 2,500 years after Gautama Buddha, or roughly 1950. According to Kent, however, the traits which the editors say are predicted by the "Metteya Legend" either are not actually present in the Buddhist texts or in some cases are contradicted by the texts: instead of coming at a time of world peril, for instance, the predictions about Maitreya say he will be born to royalty whose domain is "mighty and prosperous, full of people, crowded and well fed", and rather than having hair "like flames", Kent says that the texts predict curly black hair for the Maitreya.

Author Richard Holloway writes that the underlying principle in Scientology is the ancient Hindu doctrine of reincarnation or samsara, but without nirvana. Scientologists believe in the immortality of souls that travel from one body to another in a span of a trillion years, without final salvation or damnation. "There is only the eternal return of life after life."

Hubbard has made direct references to the comparison between Scientology and eastern religions: "But are we indebted to Asia? ... All of us have the same potentials, but it happens that the information which has been collected over the years is available in Asia. It has been not preserved in the Western world. Therefore, we look to such things as the Veda." Hubbard says in the Phoenix Lectures: "And what we have just talked about in terms of knowing the way to Knowingness, is very, very closely associated here with Buddha, or Lord Buddha, or Gautama Buddha, or the Blessed One, or the Enlightened one."

In a study that compares Scientology with Eastern religions, scholar Roy Wallis wrote that there are a lot of parallels between Hindu yoga and Scientology. In Hindu yoga, the yoga system would lead to a knowledge where the rebirth would bring about a "non conditioned mode of being", and the aim of Samkhya-yoga would consist in the dissociation of purusha (immortal spirit) from prakrti (matter). Now, the same would be the aim of Scientology in seeking to dissociate the Thetan – equivalent to purusha (immortal, free, divine) – in the attempt to liberate the self from the MEST (matter, prakrti).

== Christianity ==
In the 1985 version of his book The Kingdom of the Cults, in which Walter Ralston Martin called Scientology a cult, he contrasted several of L. Ron Hubbard's teachings of Scientology to those in the Christian Bible. Martin highlighted Scientology's multiple-god and reincarnation ideas, Hubbard's concepts that the Christ story and hell were both legends, and repentance for sin is abhorrent. Martin denounced Hubbard as being a false prophet.

=== Hubbard's views of Jesus ===
Jesus is described inconsistently, and mostly unfavorably, by L. Ron Hubbard the founder of Scientology. In early writings and lectures, Hubbard considered Jesus merely a teacher in his time, but later Hubbard described Jesus and the Crucifixion as fictitious. In later material by Hubbard in which he claimed himself to be both Maitreya Buddha and the Antichrist, Hubbard said his own mission in the world was to prevent the Second Coming of Christ and went on to describe Jesus as a "lover of young boys" and given to "uncontrollable bursts of temper and hatred".

In his 1954 lecture Scientology, Its General Background, Hubbard said "[Christ] was a bringer of information. He never announced his sources. He spoke of them as coming from God."

In Scientology, an implant is a fake memory installed by evil forces. Mark Driscoll wrote, "According to Scientology, Jesus is an 'implant' forced upon a Thetan about a million years ago". Jack Huberman wrote that in Scientology Jesus is seen as having been "implanted in humanity's collective memory" by the character Xenu from Scientology space opera. Jon Atack wrote that Scientology is essentially anti-Christian, and "Hubbard attacked Christianity as an 'implant', and said that Christ was a fiction." Bent Corydon quoted Hubbard as stating that Christianity evolved from the "R6 implant": "The man on the cross. There was no Christ! The Roman Catholic Church, through watching the dramatizations of people picked up some little fragments of R6." Hubbard described the belief that the Christian heaven is "the product of two implants dating back more than 43 trillion years". He said further that heaven is a "false dream" that leads thetans to a goal that does not exist, and persuades them of the singularity of this life.

In Operating Thetan level VIII, as seen in the Fishman Affidavit, Hubbard explains the untold story of his life's work. Hubbard teaches that "the historic Jesus was not nearly the sainted figure [he] has been made out to be. In addition to being a lover of young boys and men, he was given to uncontrollable bursts of temper and hatred". Hubbard mentions the Book of Revelation and its prophecy of a time when "an arch-enemy of Christ, referred to as the anti-Christ, will reign". According to Hubbard, the "anti-Christ represents the forces of Lucifer". Hubbard writes "My mission could be said to fulfill the Biblical promise represented by this brief anti-Christ period."

=== Church of England ===
The Church of England complained in March 2003 to the Advertising Standards Authority (ASA) about the Church's advertising poster promoting Narconon—the drug rehabilitation program based on the works of L. Ron Hubbard. The poster claimed "250,000 people salvaged from drugs". The Church of England Diocese of Birmingham challenged the claim. Upholding the complaint, the ASA considered that, "without clarification, readers were likely to interpret the claim '250,000 people salvaged from drugs' to mean that 250,000 people had stopped being dependent on street or prescription drugs because of Scientology". The Authority "accepted that more than 250,000 people had undertaken the Church's Drug Purification and Drug Rundown programmes, which were designed to free people from the effects of taking drugs", but "the Authority understood that, within Scientology, the concept of 'drug use' referred to a variety of behaviors that ranged from heavy use of street drugs to occasional ingestion of alcohol or prescription medicines and exposure to chemical toxins".

The Diocese of Birmingham objected to Scientology using space in the community centre allotted for religious use. The Diocese spokesman pointed out that Scientology does not have religious status in the UK: "Scientology has rightly been refused recognition as a religion by the UK Charity Commissioners", and that Scientology is "as much a religion as a dog is a vegetable".

=== Eastern Orthodox Church ===
Maximos Aghiorgoussis, the bishop of the Greek Orthodox Archdiocese of America in Pittsburgh, has stated that Scientology is not in fact a "church", but rather a gnostic or theosophical system of thought. He went on to say that there are at least six serious points of contention between the two groups, including:

- the pantheistic nature of Scientology;
- Scientology's contention that the individual is a noncorporeal, semi-divine "thetan", which runs contrary to the Greek Orthodox view that the individual is both body and soul and, while created in the image of God, not a god himself;
- Scientology's belief that the universe is the "result of a game of the thetans", rather than the account of the Genesis creation narrative;
- Scientology's belief that the thetan can be saved through the clearing of its engrams, which differs from the Christian view of salvation being only through Christ; and
- Scientology's view that death is "of no consequence and significance because death is repeated innumerable times", which runs contrary to the Christian view of a single physical incarnation.

He also states that "Scientology teaches that psychic powers, (evil) spirits, and out-of-body events can be used in order for the thetans to rediscover their true powers. Because of this, there have been parallels drawn between Scientology and occultism. He goes on to say that, in spite of Scientology's claims to enhance mental health, that many people have already been damaged by Dianetics. Calling upon what he describes as "unclean spirits", the inexperience of those who do auditing cause "hallucination, irrational behavior, severe disorientation, strange bodily sensations, physical and mental illness, unconsciousness, and suicide. Hubbard admitted most of the above hazards, 'although he maintained that they occurred only through misapplication of the technology of Scientology'".

In May 2001, the Russian Orthodox Church criticized Scientologists, Jehovah's Witnesses, Unificationists, and Mormons as being dangerous "totalitarian sects".

=== Lutheran Church ===
The Lutheran Church in Germany has criticized Scientology's activities and doctrines, along with those of several religious movements. According to the U.S. State Department's 2004 Country Reports on Human Rights Practices, "The Lutheran Church also characterizes the Church of Jesus Christ of Latter-day Saints (Mormons), the Jehovah's Witnesses, the Church of Christ, Christian Scientists, the New Apostolic Church, and the Johannish Church (Johannische Kirche) as 'sects,' but in less negative terms than it does Scientology".

=== Roman Catholic Church ===
The Roman Catholic Church has not made official doctrinal pronouncements specifically related to Scientology, but Cardinal Marc Ouellet stated "Scientology is something else. For me, this community is not a Church." Certain beliefs that are widely associated with Scientology, such as past lives, are specifically rejected by the Catholic Church as being incompatible with Catholic belief and practice. Scientology is also, according to a number of religious scholars, a form of gnosticism, which would make it hard to reconcile with Roman Catholicism and other denominations that regard gnosticism as a heresy.

New religious movement scholar Douglas E. Cowan compares the basic auditing session in Scientology to the Roman Catholic confessional. He writes, "the auditing session is about confession – the discovery, revelation, and absolution of critical life experiences." He differentiates the two, however, the confession is mediated by the physicality of the screen and auditing is mediated by the e-meter.

== Nation of Islam ==
Scientology's relationship with the Nation of Islam (NOI) is related to its inclusivity of other denominations, according to scholar Donald A. Westbrook. This relationship developed since 2009, with 4000 members of the NOI receiving introductory training as auditors with the endorsement of NOI Leader Louis Farrakhan. The affiliation between NOI and the Church of Scientology began when Tony Muhammad, head of the NOI Western Region was introduced to Scientology by Alfreddie Johnson. Farrakhan then asked Johnson about "growing a relationship" between NOI and the Church of Scientology. Johnson made a presentation about Scientology to Farrakhan in Clearwater, which resulted in Farrakhan pledging to go Clear and OT and train NOI ministers in the practice of Dianetics.

In May 2011, the Nation of Islam (NOI) announced in an official newspaper that an estimated 700 NOI members have become certified Hubbard Dianetics Auditors, with more NOI members soon to be trained in Scientology techniques.

Farrakhan is known to encourage his congregation to read Dianetics and receive training for auditing. Eliza Gray comments on a comparison and contrast of the two religions, asserting that "at the core of both religions is a never-ending pursuit of a better self. In the case of Scientology, that best self is 'clear' of residual traumas buried in the subconscious. In the Nation [of Islam], that self is free of hang-ups of white culture that black people have internalized to their detriment." Farrakhan has taught his followers to seek truth wherever it is contained, despite the inherent contradiction of following Hubbard's teaching while he poses resistance to the "whites." He declares to his followers that L. Ron Hubbard has made "white people better than they are," describing Hubbard's Dianetics as a way for "whites to expunge themselves from 'devilish' qualities."

Farrakhan supports Hubbard's spiritual technology, including auditing, which he claims is a "vital tool" for the awakening of his people. Leah Nelson writes that Farrakhan "has been telling his followers to embrace Scientology in order to move closer to perfection in preparation for the end times." Farrakhan has commented on the complementary and supplementary role that Scientology has on NOI. He does not necessarily view Dianetics training as conversion into Scientology, rather, he views Hubbard's technologies as tools for "black empowerment and betterment which contribute to his particular theological vision for Muslims in America," as Donald A. Westbrook writes. Speculating on Farrakhan's enthusiasm for Scientology, Chip Berlet of the Southern Poverty Law Center, hypothesizes: "The possibility exists that Farrakhan sees his followers as not 'clear' enough to make contact with the Mothership."

Gerald Williams asserts that just like NOI, Scientology is a "very rationalized or modern religion." Jacob Michael King states that both religions are "engaged in reframing traditional spiritual ideas, and both employ scientific language in an attempt to "modernize" elements seen as outdated." Dianetic Auditing runs parallel with NOI's determination of the knowledge of self. "While self-knowledge in the NOI offers the believer an identity as part of a collective, auditing through 'locating areas of spiritual distress... and improving their condition' purports to free the individual to determine herself and to better author her own destiny," states Jacob King.

Chicago, Inglewood, Hollywood and Clearwater are the loci of NOI Dianetics training. The Church of Scientology Community Center in Inglewood also functions as a Sunday meeting place for NOI members. Scientologists have also worked with NOI-lead initiatives to reduce crime rates in the Los Angeles inner cities, using the Scientology-sponsored program The Way to Happiness.

== See also ==
- Scientology status by country
- Scientology cross
