= Scientology status by country =

Recognition of Scientology and the Church of Scientology varies from country to country with respect to state recognition for religious status, charitable status, or tax exempt status. Decisions are contingent upon the legal constructs of each individual country, and results are not uniform worldwide. For example, the absence of a clear definition for 'religion' or 'religious worship' has resulted in unresolved and uncertain status for Scientology in some countries.

Some local branches of Scientology do not meet the legal prerequisites for recognition as a religion-supporting organization in certain countries, and still other countries regard Scientology as a dangerous cult. Such countries may treat Scientology as a commercial enterprise or even forbid its practice.

In 1993, the Church of Scientology was granted tax exempt status in the United States, its home country. Though it has received religious recognition in some countries, in other countries it operates either as a non-profit or for-profit non-religious organization. The Church of Scientology frequently pursues litigation to obtain state recognition for religious status.

== Strategy ==
The Church of Scientology's interest is to be recognized as a religion as well as a charitable organization. Max Halupka observes "While a tax-exempt status is not a legal declaration of religious authenticity, the significance afforded the status by the public serves to color its true purpose. That is, to the public, tax-exemption denotes legal recognition and, thus, religious legitimacy." Using perception management as an influence tactic, the Church of Scientology has sought legitimacy as a mainstream religion through public acceptance. Halupka continues, "From a marketing standpoint, such legal recognition could be utilized in combating the general perception of [the Church of Scientology's] cult status, which resulted, in large part, from criticisms of the religion's seemingly profit-driven purpose."

Scientology has been shut down in Greece, indicted in Spain, its activities restricted in Russia, rebuffed by Sweden's highest court, expelled from college campuses in Norway, convicted of crimes in Canada and denied status as a charitable organization or a religion in most European countries.

— St. Petersburg Times (1999)

== Scientology as a religion ==
Scientology is officially recognized as a religion in the United States. Recognition came in 1993, when the Internal Revenue Service (IRS) stated that "[Scientology is] operated exclusively for religious and charitable purposes."

The New York Times noted in this connection that the Church of Scientology had funded a campaign which included a whistle-blower organization to publicly attack the IRS, as well as hiring of private investigators to look into the private lives of IRS officials. In 1991, Miscavige, the highest-ranking Scientology leader, arranged a meeting with Fred T. Goldberg Jr., the Commissioner of the Internal Revenue Service at the time. According to the Church of Scientology's version of events, the meeting was an opportunity for the organization to offer to end its long dispute with the IRS, including the dozens of suits brought against the agency, in exchange for the exemptions that Scientology believed it deserved. Goldberg's response was quite out of the ordinary: he created a special working group to resolve the dispute, bypassing the agency's exempt organizations division. The group met several times with the Scientology legal team and, according to an unnamed official quoted by the New York Times, "was persuaded that those involved in the Snow White crimes had been purged, that church money was devoted to tax-exempt purposes and that, with Mr. Hubbard's death, no one was getting rich from Scientology."

In August 1993, a settlement was reached; the organization would receive its tax-exempt status and end its legal actions against the IRS and its personnel. The organization was required only to resubmit new applications for exemption to the IRS Exempt Organizations (EO) division, which was told "not to consider any substantive matters" because those issues had been resolved by the committee. The secret agreement was announced on October 13, 1993, with the IRS refusing to disclose any of the terms or the reasoning behind the decision. Both the IRS and Scientology rejected any allegations that foul play or undue pressure had been used on IRS officials, insisting that the decision had been based on the merits of the case. IRS officials "insisted that Scientology's tactics had not affected the decision" and that "ultimately the decision was made on a legal basis". Miscavige claims that the IRS's examination of Scientology was the most exhaustive review of any non-profit organization in history.

Elsewhere, Scientology is recognized as a religion in Australia, Portugal, Spain, and Kyrgyzstan. In New Zealand, the Inland Revenue Department classified the Church of Scientology as a charitable organization and stated that its income would be tax exempt. Scientology officials have won the right to perform marriages in South Africa. In Italy, Scientology was judicially recognized as a religious denomination in 2000, when the Supreme Court held that Christian-based definitions of religion are not applicable because they would lead to the exclusion of Taoism, Buddhism, and many polytheistic, shamanistic, or animist religions.

Scientology is not recognized as a religion in Canada. In the UK, the Charity Commission for England and Wales ruled in 1999 that Scientology was not a religion and refused to register the organization as a charity, although a year later, it was recognized as a not-for-profit body in a separate proceeding by the UK Revenue and Customs and exempted from UK value added tax. In December 2013, the United Kingdom's highest court officially recognized Scientology as a religion. The ruling ended a five-year legal battle by Scientologist Louisa Hodkin, who sought the legal right to marry at the Church of Scientology chapel in central London. The opinion by five supreme court justices redefined religion in law, rendering the 1970 definition "out of date" in restricting religious worship to "reverence or veneration of God or of a Supreme Being".

In May 2008, the City of London police, senior officers of which had earlier received gifts worth thousands of pounds from the Scientology organization, unsuccessfully attempted to initiate a prosecution of a 15-year-old boy following a peaceful protest at which he held a sign reading "Scientology is not a religion, it is a dangerous cult". This statement is a quote from a superior court judgement against the Scientology organization. The summons was ostensibly issued under the Public Order Act 1986. The City of London police were swiftly instructed by the Crown Prosecution Service (CPS) that the word "cult" was "not abusive or insulting" to the Church of Scientology. The CPS advised the force on what action or behaviour at a demonstration might be considered to be threatening, abusive or insulting. The police force was then obliged to accept that their policing of future demonstrations would reflect this advice.

== Scientology as a commercial enterprise ==
Scientology has been accused of being "a business, often given to criminal acts, and sometimes masquerading as a religion".

In conjunction with the Church of Scientology's request to be officially recognized as a religion in Germany, around 1996 the German state Baden-Württemberg conducted an investigation of the group's activities within Germany. The results of this investigation indicated that at the time of publication, Scientology's main sources of revenue ("Haupteinnahmequellen der SO") were from course offerings and sales of their various publications. Course offerings ranged from (German Marks) DM 182.50 to about DM 30,000 – the equivalent today of approximately $119 to US$19,560. Revenue from monthly, bi-monthly, and other membership offerings could not be estimated in the report.

Since 1997, Germany has considered Scientology to be in conflict with the principles of the nation's constitution. It is seen as an anticonstitutional sect and a new version of political extremism and because there is "evidence for intentions against the free democratic basic order" it is observed by the Federal Office for the Protection of the Constitution. In 1997, an open letter to then-German Chancellor, Helmut Kohl, published as a newspaper advertisement in the International Herald Tribune, drew parallels between the "organized oppression" of Scientologists in Germany and the treatment of Jews in 1930s' Nazi Germany. The letter was signed by Dustin Hoffman, Goldie Hawn and a number of other Hollywood celebrities and executives.

Commenting on the matter, a spokesman for the U.S. Department of State said that Scientologists were discriminated against in Germany, but condemned the comparisons to the Nazis' treatment of Jews as extremely inappropriate, as did a United Nations Special Rapporteur. Based on the IRS exemptions, the U.S. State Department formally criticized Germany for discriminating against Scientologists and began to note Scientologists' complaints of harassment in its annual human rights reports, as well as the annual International Religious Freedom Reports it has released from 1999 onwards. Germany will continue to monitor Scientology's activities in the country, despite continued objection from Scientology which cites such monitoring as abuse of freedom of religion.

France and Belgium have not recognized Scientology as a religion, and Stephen A. Kent, writing in 2001, noted that recognition had not been obtained in Ireland, Luxembourg, Israel or Mexico either. Although the Belgian State Prosecution Service recommended that various individuals and organizations associated with Scientology should be prosecuted, the Belgian courts finally decided in March 2016 that Scientology is not a criminal organization.

In Greece, Scientology is not recognized as a religion by the Greek government, and multiple applications for religious status have been denied, notably in 2000 and 2003.

In the Netherlands, Scientology was granted tax exempt status in October 2013. The status was revoked in October 2015. The court ruled that because auditing fees and course costs were more expensive than most commercial education institutions, Scientology appeared to be aimed at making a profit.

The Church of Scientology maintains strict control over the use of its symbols, icons, and names. It claims copyright and trademark over its "Scientology cross", and its lawyers have threatened lawsuits against individuals and organizations who have published the image in books and on Web sites. The Church of Scientology seeks to make it very difficult for individual groups to attempt to publicly practice Scientology on their own, independent of the official Church of Scientology. Scientology has filed suit against a number of individuals who have attempted to set up their own auditing practices, using copyright and trademark law to shut these groups down.

The Church of Scientology and its many related organizations have amassed considerable real estate holdings worldwide, likely in the hundreds of millions of dollars. Scientology encourages existing members to "sell" Scientology to others by paying a commission to those who recruit new members. Scientology franchises, or missions, must pay the Church of Scientology roughly 10% of their gross income. On that basis, it is likened to a pyramid selling scheme. While introductory courses do not cost much, courses at the higher levels may cost several thousand dollars each.

In November 2009, the Australian Senator Nick Xenophon used a speech in the Federal Parliament to allege that the Church of Scientology has engaged in criminal activity. Based on letters from former followers, he said that there were "allegations of forced imprisonment, coerced abortions, and embezzlement of church funds, of physical violence and intimidation, blackmail and the widespread and deliberate abuse of information obtained by the organization".

== Africa ==
=== Egypt ===
Scientology has no official presence in Egypt because non-monotheistic religions are not recognized. In 2002, a couple was arrested on "contempt of religion" charges for trying to establish a branch. A few Scientology-published books have been circulated under the guise of being "secular" or "non-religious", including Dianetics: The Modern Science of Mental Health, and as of 2023 there is a Narconon center in the country.

=== Kenya ===
No known legal recognition as a religion.

=== South Africa ===
In 1975, Scientology was recognized as a non-profit organization in South Africa, despite the 1972 report of a formal government Commission of Inquiry that recommended otherwise. In December 2007, South Africa granted a certificate to the Church (Note: Use of "Church" or "the Church" is a common shortened form of "Church of Scientology"; see The Church (Scientology).) recognizing it as a "Public Benefit Organisation".

=== Zimbabwe ===
According to the Rhodesia Herald, L. Ron Hubbard had by 1966 bought a hotel in Salisbury. During the year to 5 April 1968, Scientology in the United Kingdom had lost £33,171 on a "Rhodesian Mission Branch".

== Americas ==
=== Argentina ===
No known recognition as a religion. As of 2012, it was officially recognised as a cult.

=== Brazil ===
Not registered as a religion. It was registered as a non-religious "private association" under CNPJ number 05.586.122/0001-25, operating as a publisher under the name Editora Ponte do Brasil. The organization had the following registered activities: sound recording and music edition, book publishing, distribution of movies, videos and TV programs, when it was voluntarily liquidated on August 19, 2022.

=== Canada ===
The 1997 Freedom of religion and belief: a world report by the Human Rights Centre of the University of Essex stated that "the Church of Scientology has been recognised as a religion [in Canada] through several administrative decisions on matters such as tax exemption and authorisation to perform marriages." The Varsity, a student newspaper, reported in 2007 that the Church of Scientology's ministers can perform marriages in Canada and that Scientologist public servants are allowed to take time off work for Scientologist holidays. A 2008 article in the Torontoist stated that the Church does not have status as a federally registered charity for tax purposes. Religious scholars Douglas E. Cowan and David G. Bromley stated in a 2006 publication that "Scientology has yet to receive official recognition as a religion in Canada".

=== Chile ===
As of 2009, Scientology had been considered a cult. The Constitution of Chile provides for freedom of religion, and a religious group in Chile may apply for legal public right status (comprehensive religious nonprofit status). As of 2012, Scientology did not have legal religious recognition.

=== Colombia ===
No known recognition.

=== Costa Rica ===
Scientology was recognized as a religion in Costa Rica in 1991.

=== Mexico ===
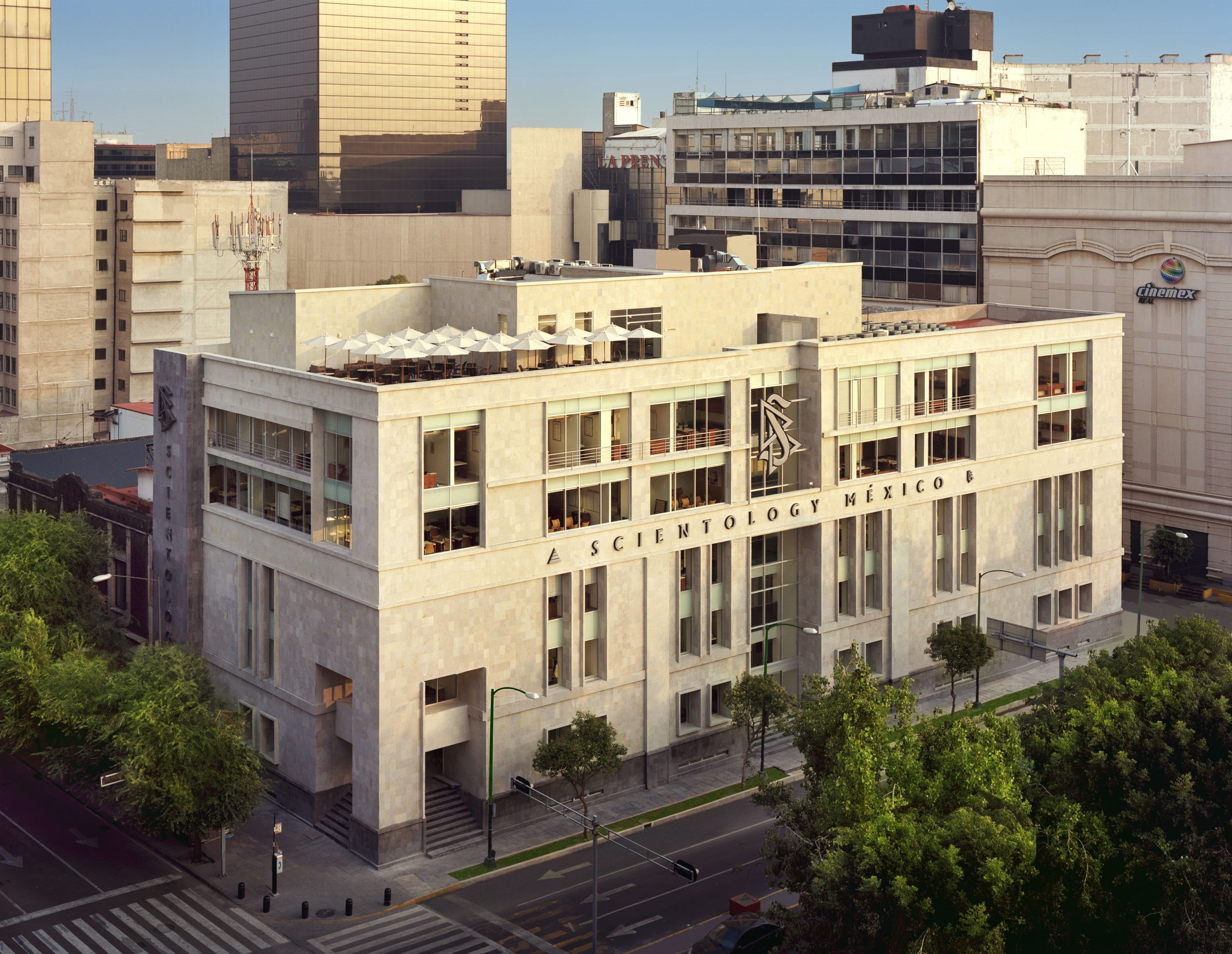
Scientology México headquarters in Mexico City near the Alameda Central. The Secretaría de Gobernación has denied the Church of Scientology's petition to be legally recognized as a religion three times.

No known legal recognition as a religion.

=== Nicaragua ===
Scientology is recognized as a minority religion in Nicaragua.

=== United States of America ===
In 1967 the Internal Revenue Service revoked the Church of Scientology's tax-exempt status because it failed to meet the criteria in section 501(c)(3) of the Internal Revenue Code. In 1993, the IRS granted Scientology a 501(c) nonprofit status, giving it the same favorable tax treatment as other nonprofit organizations. A New York Times article says that Scientologists paid private investigators to obtain compromising material on the IRS commissioner and blackmailed the IRS into submission.

== Asia ==
=== China and Taiwan ===
The People's Republic of China recognises just five state-sanctioned religious entities; Scientology has no legal status in the country.

In 2003, the Ministry of the Interior (Taiwan) recognized Scientology as a religion. Fifteen Scientology missions and churches operate in Taiwan.

=== India ===
According to a 2012 report, there is no method of confirming the exact number of Scientologists in India, "but an estimated 6,000-7,000 individuals have taken various Scientology courses offered by the Delhi mission". In February 2003, the Registrar of Companies of Delhi and Haryana registered the Religious Foundation of Scientology of New Delhi. In November 2003, the Director of Income Tax Exemptions for New Delhi granted the Scientology tax-exempt status. In 2004, the Religious Foundation of Scientology of Kolkata and Religious Foundation of Scientology of Mysore were likewise registered.

=== Indonesia ===
Indonesian government legislation recognizes the "right of all religions to exist and function in society" and "the Church of Scientology has experienced no difficulties in gaining registration", but there has been no legal recognition as a religion.

=== Israel ===
In January 1987, a parliamentary commission on cults, headed by MK Miriam Glazer-Ta'asa, declared Scientology a cult, although no further measures were taken. Its practice is legal.

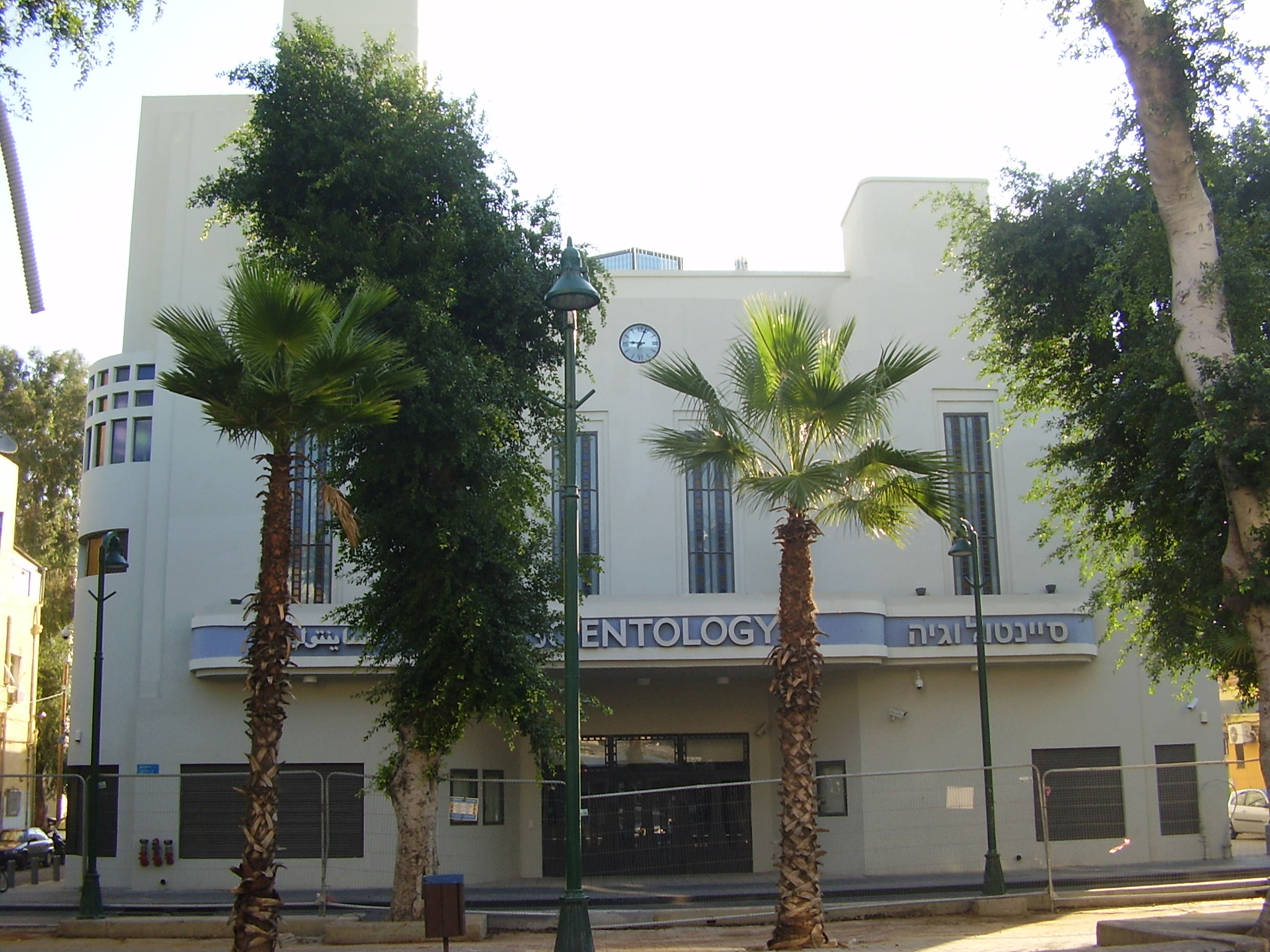
Alhambra Cinema in Jaffa

In 1987, an Israeli parliamentary commission declared it a cult, but the practice of Scientology in Israel is legal. In Israel, according to Israeli professor of psychology Benjamin Beit-Hallahmi, "in various organizational forms, Scientology has been active among Israelis for more than thirty years, but those in charge not only never claimed the religion label, but resisted any such suggestion or implication. It has always presented itself as a secular, self-improvement, tax-paying business." Those "organizational forms" include a Scientology Organization in Tel Aviv. Another Israeli Scientology group called "The Way to Happiness" (or "Association for Prosperity and Security in the Middle East") works through local Scientologist members to promote The Way to Happiness. An Israeli CCHR chapter runs campaigns against perceived abuses in psychiatry. Other Scientology campaigns, such as "Youth for Human Rights International" are active as well. There is also an ultra-Orthodox Jewish group that opposes Scientology and other cults or missionary organizations in Israel, Lev L'Achim, whose anti-missionary department in 2001 provided a hotline and other services to warn citizens of Scientology's "many types of front organizations".

=== Japan ===
In 2015, the first Church of Scientology in Japan was opened in Tokyo. However, Japan does not officially recognize Scientology as a religion.

=== Kazakhstan ===
According to the U.S. State Department's 2008 International Religious Freedom Report, Scientologists are among many minority groups facing increasingly negative media coverage in Kazakhstan. During a press conference on April 10, 2008, a spokesperson for the Kazakh government's Procurator General's Office claimed that there were approximately 1,870 religious organizations in the country that presented a threat to national security and were engaged in destructive operations, citing Scientologists as one of the examples (these statements were later removed from the press conference transcript posted on the PGO website).

In 2008, parliament discussed new draft legislation which would severely restrict religious freedom. In February 2009, Interfax reported that Kazakh prosecutors were seeking liquidation of the Scientology Church in Karaganda. In a statement on its website, the Kazakh Prosecutor General's Office cited concerns over national security, as Scientologists' activity was aimed at undermining the "Kazakh nation's health through inflicting harm on people's psychic and physical health", and added that Scientologists were practising medicine outside medical institutions, and without the requisite education.

=== Kyrgyzstan ===
The U.S. Department of State's 2005 Report on International Religious Freedom announced that the Church of Scientology had been registered as a religious group by the Kyrgyzstan State Commission on Religious Affairs.

=== Nepal ===
No known legal recognition as a religion.

=== Philippines ===
The Philippines recognizes the Church of Scientology as a religious organization.

=== Taiwan ===
In 2003, the National Ministry of the Interior for Taiwan recognized the Church of Scientology of Taiwan as a charitable religious institution, officially adding it to the rolls of the country's recognized religions. Taiwan has 15 Scientology missions and churches, including the one in Kaohsiung.

== Europe ==
=== Austria ===
Tax-exempt status as a charitable organization. It is not recognized as a religious association in Austria.

=== Belgium ===
Belgium officially recognizes only six religions: Roman Catholicism, Protestantism, Anglicanism, the Eastern Orthodox Church, Judaism and Islam.

In 2005, Scientology's application for the status of a recognized religion was refused.

In September 2007, a Belgian prosecutor announced that they had finished an investigation of Scientology and said they would probably bring charges. The Church of Scientology said the prosecutor's public announcement falsely suggested guilt even before a court could hear any of the charges. In December 2012, Belgian officials completed their file on Scientology and brought charges of extortion, illegal medicine, various breaches of privacy, and fraud.

In March 2016, the Church of Scientology was acquitted of all charges, and demands to close its Belgian branch and European headquarters were dismissed. The presiding judge, Yves Regimont, criticized the investigators and prosecutors, "The entire proceedings are declared inadmissible for a serious and irremediable breach of the right to a fair trial.

=== Croatia ===
In 2002, Croatia passed a law in the parliament on the legal status of religious communities. Scientology was given the legal status of a religious community by the decision of the Ministry of Administration in 2003. According to the Croatian Law, in order for a new religious community to be registered in the register of religious communities and to be officially recognized by the Croatian state, it must have a minimum of 500 followers. In response to a press inquiry, the Croatian Ministry of Administration confirmed that the Church of Scientology in Croatia is actually registered as an existing religious community, and that the Croatian authorities do not have data on the number of believers in Church of Scientology in Croatia.

=== Czech Republic ===
Not registered as a religion. Scientology is not recorded in the register of churches and religious societies. Dianetics centers are registered as associations.

=== Denmark ===
In Denmark, the Church of Scientology is not officially approved as a religion. It first applied for approval in the early 1970s; two further unsuccessful applications followed in 1976 and 1982. In mid-1997, the Church of Scientology filed a fourth application, which was suspended at their own request in 2000. In suspending their application, the Church asked the Ministry of Ecclesiastical Affairs to clarify the approval procedure. It was told that it must first submit an application before any feedback could be provided. Despite Scientology's unofficial status, the Church of Scientology maintains its European headquarters in Copenhagen.

=== Finland ===
Scientology is not officially recognized as a religion in Finland. An application by the Church of Scientology to be registered as a religious body was denied by the Ministry of Education in 1998 on the grounds that "the known nature of the activities is not public worship in the sense meant by the law on freedom of religion". The denial was issued after the Church "had failed to comply with a request for more information".

=== France ===
Since 1995, Scientology has been classified as a secte (cult) by boards of inquiry commissioned by the National Assembly of France. It was first designated a sect in a 1995 report, and then in a 1999 report it was classified as an "absolute" sect and recommended its dissolution.

In 2000, after 'appeals for religious tolerance' from USA President Clinton and his congress, president of France Jacques Chirac told Clinton to stay out of France's business, noting "shocking White House support for Scientologists". Alain Vivien, chairman of the Ministerial Mission to Combat the Influence of Cults, claimed that sects—primarily headed and funded by Scientology—had been infiltrating the United Nations and other European human rights organizations. In 2001, France passed the About–Picard law, intended to strengthen their ability to prevent and repress sects that undermine human rights and fundamental freedoms, and those which engage in mental manipulation. The law would allow courts "to order the immediate dissolution of any movement regarded as a cult whose members are found guilty of such existing offences as fraud, abuse of confidence, the illegal practice of medicine, wrongful advertising and sexual abuse."

A 2009 case resulted in a fraud conviction against two Church of Scientology organizations and five individuals, and recommended dissolution, and a 2012 appeal upheld the convictions including 600,000EUR in fines. Though the prosecution had requested the dissolution of the Scientology Celebrity Centre and its bookstore, a dissolution penalty wasn't possible due to a brief retraction of the dissolution law prior to the 2009 verdict and the prohibition against enforcing it retroactively.

In France, a parliamentary report classified Scientology as a dangerous cult. On November 22, 1996, the leader of the Lyon Church of Scientology, Jean-Jacques Mazier, was convicted of fraud and involuntary homicide and sentenced to eighteen months in prison for his role in the death of a member who committed suicide after going deeply into debt to pay for Scientology auditing sessions. Fourteen others were convicted of fraud as well. In 2009, members of the organization were sued for fraud and practicing pharmacology without a license, and the organization was convicted of fraud in October 2009, being fined €600,000, with additional fines and suspended prison sentences for four officers.

In an interview on the Canadian Broadcasting Corporation current affairs radio program The Current with Hana Gartner, former high-ranking Scientology official Mark Rathbun commented that the decision to convict the Church of Scientology of fraud in France would not have a significant impact on the organization. "On the France thing I don't think that's going to have any lasting impact, simply because they got a nine hundred thousand dollar fine I think – which is like chump change to them. They've got literally nearly a billion dollars set aside in a war chest", said Rathbun.

=== Germany ===
The status of Scientology in Germany is unresolved. Two points are contested: firstly, whether or not the teachings of Scientology qualify as a religious or ideological teaching, and secondly, whether or not these teachings are only used as a pretext for purely commercial activity; if the latter were the case, this would most likely imply that Scientology would not qualify for protection as a religious or ideological community under Article 4 of the German constitution.

In Germany, official views of Scientology are particularly skeptical. In Germany it is seen as a totalitarian anti-democratic organization and is under observation by national security organizations due to, among other reasons, suspicion of violating the human rights of its members granted by the German Constitution, including Hubbard's pessimistic views on democracy vis-à-vis psychiatry and other such features. In December 2007, Germany's interior ministers said that they considered the goals of Church of Scientology to be in conflict with the principles of the nation's constitution and would seek to ban the organization. The plans were quickly criticized as ill-advised. The plans to ban Scientology were finally dropped in November 2008, after German officials found insufficient evidence of illegal activity.

The legal status of the Church of Scientology in Germany is still awaiting resolution; some courts have ruled that it is a business, others have affirmed its religious nature. The German government has affirmed that it does not consider the Church of Scientology to be a religious community.

In 2017, a scandal ensued at the Haus der Kunst museum when it was discovered that the hiring contractor was a Scientologist who had hired several Scientologists to work at the museum. According to the New York Times, "Scientology is considered a threat to democracy [in Germany] and ... employees can be dismissed from government or state-funded organizations if they are members of a Scientologist group. Three Scientologists were fired, and the flap exposed fissures between Okwui Enwezor and some members of his staff." Other employees had repeatedly complained that management wasn't taking any action. The Bavarian constitutional protection warns that Scientology wants to infiltrate companies and authorities by filling key positions in order to spread its ideas.

In 1996, the US State Department criticized Germany for discriminating against Scientologists and pressured Germany, turning it into a "diplomatic ruckus".

=== Greece ===
In 1995, after complaints from parents demanding Scientology stop controlling their children, prosecutors raided the Scientology center and seized documents. A 1996 trial resulted in Scientology being shut down in 1997 because it had obtained its license under false pretenses. "Scientology obtained a license in Greece as a non-profit, public interest organization. Greek courts found it to be a profitmaking group that endangers the mental and physical well-being of its members." The decision was affirmed in a 1998 appeal which "found that Scientology causes a personality change in members and interferes with famility relationships" and ordered the liquidation of Scientology's assets.

Religious groups must obtain "house of prayer" permits from the Ministry of Education and Religion, and permits are available only to "recognized or known religions". An application for a house of prayer permit was denied in 2000 on the grounds that Scientology "is not a religion".

As of 2019, Scientology lacks religious-entity status and has no house of prayer permits, but continues to function as a registered nonprofit civil law organization. Scientology-performed weddings are not recognized. In September 2023, the Church of Greece issued a statement describing Scientology as a "pseudo-religious organisation with socially dangerous activities" and claiming Scientology "has been active under other names, fronting seemingly innocuous services such as self-improvement seminars or sales seminars for businesses."

=== Ireland ===
Scientology does not have religious or tax-free charitable status in the Republic of Ireland.

As in most European countries, the Church of Scientology is not officially recognized in Ireland as a charitable organization. The Irish government has not invited the Church of Scientology to national discussions on secularization by the Religious Council of Ireland. The meetings were attended by Roman Catholic bishops, representatives of the Church of Ireland, Ireland's Chief Rabbi, and Muslim leaders.

=== Italy ===
In terms of corporate status, the Italian Church of Scientology is one of Italy's non-profit and common-law associations; it has neither an intesa (recognition agreement with the Italian state), nor is it a recognized confessional community (ente di culto). Some courts, including those in Rome and Turin, have viewed Scientology as a religion, although the Appeals Court of Milan did not do so during the criminal trial of various Scientologists. After it twice refused to recognize Scientology as a religion, its decisions were overturned by the Italian Supreme Court. In March 2000, the Italian Supreme Court upheld Scientology's religious status in Italy while reaffirming that Narconon is a non-tax-exempt for-profit business.

=== Netherlands ===
After nine years of review, Scientology was recognized as a charitable organization (ANBI) on August 30, 2022.

On October 17, 2013, a Dutch court ruled that "the Amsterdam arm of Scientology is a charitable organization and exempt from paying taxes." DutchNews.nl reported that the court ruled "The Scientology Church in Amsterdam be treated in the same way as other church and faith-based organizations and allowed to claim tax breaks". The appeal court also ruled that "Scientology's classes don't differ significantly from what other spiritual organizations do, or can do." The court noted "Scientology movement's training programs are not the same as those offered by commercial companies because people who cannot afford them pay a reduced fee or get them free" and that "the courses are aimed at spiritual and theoretical enlightenment."

=== North Macedonia ===
In May 2017 Basic Court Skopje II approved the registration of the Church of Scientology of Macedonia, and the Home of Prayer religious group.

=== Norway ===
Norway does not recognize the official Scientologikirken (Church of Scientology) as a religious community. Scientology started in Norway in 1977, and in 2008 there was an estimated 200 active members. Scientologikirken tried to gain religious status, which would grant them state aid, but their application was denied in December 2001. There was an appeal, but by 2008 the appeal still had not been finalized.

The Church of Scientology failed to document that they were a religious community within the meaning of the law. ... [They were] defined as a religious philosophy and not a religious community. In addition, they also had members in other denominations, and the majority of the members were in the state church. It is incompatible with the requirement that one can only be a member of one denomination. —Merethe Helstad, County governor's office

Several former members have sued Scientologikirken—most ending in a settlement, although one 1996 case ended in a judgment to refund 600,000 Norwegian krone to a former teacher who had taken out loans and paid nearly a million dollars to Scientologikirken. The Church gained controversy in the 2008 high-profile suicide case of Kaja Ballo, the daughter of Norwegian parliamentary minister Olav Gunnar Ballo.

=== Poland ===
Poland does not officially recognize Scientology as a religion.

In 1993, Scientology tried to register itself in Poland as religious movement but due to errors in application this request was rejected although Scientology organized various seminars in Poland and was selling Hubbard's books.

=== Portugal ===
The Portuguese Government officially recognized Scientology as a religion in November 2007.

=== Romania ===
The Romanian Scientology Church has only 70 members. According to the Law no. 489/2006, Scientology is not included among the 18 religions officially recognized by the State.

=== Russia ===
The Church of Scientology has been subjected to considerable pressure from the state in Russia. By 1999, Russia had outlawed the Purification Rundown as a threat to public health, and armed tax police raided several Moscow centers.

In April 2007 (Church of Scientology Moscow versus Russia) the European Court of Human Rights ruled that Russia's denial to register the Church of Scientology as a religious community was a violation of Article 11 of the European Convention on Human Rights (freedom of assembly and association) read in the light of Article 9 (freedom of thought, conscience and religion)". The court found that the reasons given to deny re-registration of the Church by the justice department and endorsed by the Moscow courts had no legal basis.

In July 2007, the St. Petersburg City Court ordered that the city's Scientology center be closed for violating its charter by engaging in unlicensed health care services. In November 2008, a court in Samara came to a similar decision, closing down the activities of the local center for practicing without a license.

In September 2009, the European Court of Human Rights issued a binding ruling in favor of two Scientology branches in Surgut and Nizhnekamsk, which had been denied registration as "religious organizations". The two organizations were awarded €20,000 in costs and damages. The ruling, which cannot be appealed against, said that Russia could not ban the Church of Scientology simply because it did not have a long history in the country.

In 2010, some of the works of L. Ron Hubbard were included into Russia's Federal List of banned extremist materials, and removed on 3 May 2011. Another such attempt was made by prosecutor in mid-2011 and was unsuccessful.

In 2011, some Scientology materials were ruled "extremist". In 2015, the Moscow branch was forced disbanded. In 2016 and 2019, police raided the Moscow and St. Petersburg branches and made several arrests. In 2021, Russia labelled World Institute of Scientology Enterprises and Church of Spiritual Technology "undesirable organizations" after finding that they "pose a threat to the security of the Russian Federation."

=== Spain ===
On October 31, 2007, the National Court in Madrid issued a decision recognizing that the National Church of Scientology of Spain should be entered in the Registry of Religious Entities. The administrative tribunal of Madrid's High Court ruled that a 2005 justice ministry decision to scrap the organization from the register was "against the law". Responding to a petition filed by the organization, the ruling said that no documents had been presented in court to demonstrate it was anything other than a religious entity.

Authorities had earlier declared that the government would not interfere in any way with the activities of the Church of Scientology.

=== Sweden ===
In 2000, the Church of Scientology received the official status of "religious community" from Sweden, opening the possibility of financial aid from the state. In 2006, Sweden's Office of Government Subsidy to Faith Communities (Nämnden för statligt stöd till trossamfund, SST) rejected the Church of Scientology's application to have membership fees collected through the tax payment process. SST's evaluation raised questions concerning its finances, governing statutes, fiscal soundness and stability, and Scientology's contribution to maintaining and strengthening the fundamental values of society. The Church of Scientology did not appeal.

=== Switzerland ===
In several cases between 1995 and 2000, the Federal Supreme Court of Switzerland consistently ruled that the Church of Scientology was a primarily commercial, rather than religious, organization, and in 2003 upheld a decision to force closure of a Scientology-affiliated school.

According to the St. Petersburg Times, "The Swiss have also restricted Scientology's use of personality tests as a pretext for recruiting on public streets", and "a Swiss security commission report issued in the fall of 1998 questioned the pressure Scientology puts on members to acquire new services and books, intelligence activities against members and critics and attempts to infiltrate governmental positions".

In 2020, during the COVID-19 pandemic, Scientology produced and printed booklets titled How to Keep Yourself and Others Well. Distributed in person by Scientologists dressed as Volunteer Ministers, local business owners sought information from a local activism group, Freie Anti-Scientology Aktivisten [Free Anti-Scientology Activists] (FASA), because they had been told the booklet was produced in cooperation with the Swiss Federal Office of Public Health (BAG). FASA contacted BAG, received a response, and posted online that BAG reported no such cooperation with Scientology. The Church of Scientology Basel sued FASA for slander; the case was dismissed after an evidentiary hearing in September 2023.

=== United Kingdom ===
Scientology was not classified as a religion by the UK government until December 2013.

In 1968, the UK banned Scientology students from entering the country, and until 1980 they banned foreign Scientologists from working in the UK. The government's 1971 official report into Scientology (the Foster Report) was highly critical, but did not ban the organization outright.

In 1999, the Church of Scientology's application for charity status in England and Wales was rejected, and the Church did not appeal. The Charity Commission concluded that the organization was not established for the public benefit, that auditing and training—the primary activities within a Church of Scientology—could not be shown to provide any recognised benefit to the public, and did not advance religion or the moral or spiritual welfare or improvement of the community.

In 2000, the Church of Scientology was exempted from UK value added tax on the basis that it was a not-for-profit body.

As of 1999, the Ministry of Defence had confirmed that Scientology was "an officially recognised religion in the Royal Navy". The UK Prison Service does not recognize Scientology as a religion, but prisoners who are registered as Scientologists may practice their religion and are allowed access to a representative of the Church of Scientology if they wish to receive its ministry.

In response to a 5-year legal battle by Scientologist Louisa Hodkin to marry at a Church of Scientology chapel, a December 2013 decision by the UK Supreme Court overruled the 1970 R v Registrar General, ex p Segerdal decision, and ruled that a London Church of Scientology chapel was a "place of meeting for religious worship" and should be registered as a place for marriage. With the new ruling, the Registrar General of Births, Marriages and Deaths recognized that weddings performed within Scientology chapels and redefined religion so that it was "not ... confined to those with belief in a supreme deity." According to its filing under the Marriage Act, Scientology will not conduct same-sex weddings in any of its UK premises. This judgement endorsed the Australian High Court decision of 1983: "Of the various attempts made to describe the characteristics of religion, I find most helpful that of Wilson and Deane". Under Scots law, Scientology ministers had been authorised to perform marriages in Scotland even prior to the December 2013 Supreme Court decision.

== Oceania ==
=== Australia ===
In 1983, the High Court of Australia dealt with the question of whether the Church of Scientology is a religious institution and as such not subject to payroll tax. The Court unanimously confirmed the organization to be a religious institution with respect to exemption from payroll taxes.

On November 18, 2009, the organization came under fire from an Independent senator in the Commonwealth Parliament, Nick Xenophon. Under parliamentary privilege in the Senate, Xenophon declared that the Church of Scientology is a criminal organization.

=== New Zealand ===
In 2002, the New Zealand Tax authority (the IRD) recognized the NZ branch of Scientology as "dedicated to the advancement of religion" and as a charitable organisation, giving it a tax-exempt status.

== See also ==
- Scientology as a business
- Scientology and religious groups
- Sociological classifications of religious movements
