= Training routines (Scientology) =

Scientology training exercises

- Type: Training exercises in Scientology
- Description: A series of drills designed to improve communication, discipline, and control during auditing and daily interactions
- Components: TR 0–TR 9, including confronting, communication drills, and control exercises
- Role: To increase focus, emotional control, and auditor effectiveness
- Key texts: Scientology training manuals and technical bulletins
- Associated controversies: Allegations of psychological pressure, repetitive drilling, coercive training methods

The training routines (TR) are training exercises or drills used in the Church of Scientology as well as affiliated programs Narconon, Criminon, WISE, and Applied Scholastics. The church describes them as a way of learning to communicate effectively and to control situations. Some critics and former Scientologists claim the training routines have a strong hypnotic effect, causing hallucinations and an out-of-body experience known in Scientology as "exteriorization".

The Training Routines that are part of early Scientology indoctrination have been compared to acting exercises: students are taught to "duplicate," or mirror, a partner's actions; project their "intention," or thoughts, onto inanimate objects; experiment with vocal tones, the most dominant being a commanding bark known as "tone 40"; and deepen their ability to "be in their bodies" without reacting to outside stimuli.

— Janet Reitman

== Overview ==
The Comm_Course is the beginning of most Scientology careers. Hubbard claimed to have been the first person to scientifically dissect communication. The Comm Course drills are called Training Routines, or TRs.

— Jon Atack

There are numerous TR drills in Scientology. Some are used for auditor training and others for administrative training. A person's earliest exposure to TRs is usually on the Success Through Communication Course, an introductory service at a Church of Scientology which teaches basic communication skills through "doing" the drills, not reading theory. The Professional TR Course and the Upper Indoc TR Course are required for auditor training. These courses are listed on The Bridge to Total Freedom.

The drills OT TR-O through TR-4 are considered communication drills, and they purport to teach a person to be there, originate a communication, repeat commands, acknowledge someone else's communication, and handle all manner of utterance from another person. The result of the Professional TR Course, which covers OT TR-O through TR-4, is "a being who can handle anyone with communication alone".

According to Paulette Cooper, the exercises are "supposed to teach someone to get commands across naturally, to get the answer to the question that he wants, to ask questions in a fresh manner, and not to start a second question until the first has been answered". Jon Atack writes that "the Comm Course helps people to hide, though not overcome, their nervousness, and to look people 'right in the eye'".

The drills TR-6 through TR-9 are considered control drills, and are taught on Upper Indoc TR Course. They purport to teach a person to control another body, and then fine tune that control so it is not 'manhandling'. The result of the course is "willingness and ability to handle bodies, objects and intention fully".

TRs are part of many of the Scientology courses, and a Scientologist will likely "do TRs" many times during their time in Scientology.

== Communication drills ==
These TRs, numbered 0–4, emphasize Scientology's "cycle of communication".

=== OT TR-0: Operating Thetan confronting ===
Two students sit facing each other with their eyes closed, sometimes for hours. The routine ends when both students can sit for an extended period without movement or drowsiness.

=== TR-0: Confronting ===
In the first exercise, a student and coach face each other with eyes open. The routine ends when the student can confront the coach for at least two hours without movement, excessive blinking, or loss of attention. The second exercise is the same, except that the coach tries to distract the student both verbally and physically. According to Jon Atack, "critics of Scientology usually mention the 'relentless stare' which for the great majority of Scientologists is habitual.

=== TR-0: Bullbait ===
The coach says things to the student to try to provoke a reaction, including teasing, joking and yelling. The coach may say or do anything except leaving the chair. The student must be able to sit and watch the coach without getting distracted or reacting in any way. If he does, the coach flunks him and the TR starts over. The coach will attempt to find the student's "buttons" (things that cause a reaction). The stated purpose of this TR is to train the student to be there in a communication situation without getting distracted.

=== TR-1: Dear Alice ===
The student reads several lines from Alice in Wonderland to the coach as if saying them himself. The coach either acknowledges the line or flunks the student according to whether the line is communicated clearly.

=== TR-2: Acknowledgements ===
The coach reads the student lines from Alice in Wonderland in a reversal of TR-1. The student must acknowledge each line so as to clearly end the cycle of communication.

=== TR-3: Duplicative question ===
The student repeatedly asks the coach, "Do birds fly?" or "Do fish swim?" If the coach answers the question, the student acknowledges the answer. If the coach says anything else, the student advises the coach that he will repeat the question, and then does so.

=== TR-4: Originations ===
The student repeatedly asks the coach a question as in TR-3. If the coach originates a statement unrelated to the question, the student handles the origination as needed and then continues the routine.

== Control drills ==
These "Upper Indoc(trination)" Training Routines, numbered 6–9, emphasize the student's ability to control people and situations.

=== TR-6: Body control ===
The student moves the coach's body around a room. In the first half of the routine the student "steers" the coach by silent actions. In the second half, the student uses verbal commands such as "Walk over to that wall." Each successful verbal command must be acknowledged.

=== TR-7: High School Indoc ===
This routine is similar to TR-6, except that the coach resists the student verbally and physically. The student may use physical contact to enforce a command. The routine continues until the student can fully control the coach despite attempts to stop control.

=== TR-8: Tone 40 on an object ===
The student repeatedly commands an ashtray to stand up and sit down, acknowledging each action. Although the student holds the ashtray throughout the exercise, the goal is to cause the ashtray to move purely by tone 40 intention.

=== TR-9: Tone 40 on a person ===
As in TR-6, the student moves the coach around a room with verbal commands. The coach resists, and the student must use a combination of smooth physical control and unspoken intention to make the coach obey. The routine continues until the student can maintain exact intention despite resistance.

== TR-L: Lying ==
The "Intelligence Specialist Training Routine" (TR-L) is used to teach someone to easily and convincingly lie, giving plausible but untrue information with the ability to elaborate.

== Criticism ==
According to Cooper, the training routines are "unbelievably tiring and boring" and can induce hallucinations. When Cooper did the drills, she experienced emotions, itching, twitching, stiffness, blurred vision, and hallucinating. Atack also hallucinated during TR-0. Bullbait can also be incredibly uncomfortable during the drill. It took Atack two hours to get through being called a homosexual by his drilling partner, and Cooper was on the receiving end of much explicit and perverse sexual solicitations; that "sounded disgustingly similar to an obscene telephone caller without the benefit of a telephone". Janet Reitman recounts the story of a thirteen year old girl who was partnered with a teenage boy during bullbait: "Then, at one point he started to unzip his pants, I was horrified, but I just had to sit there. It was mortifying."

In 2015, Atack mentioned that "OT-TR0 has the potentially sinister aspect of immediate group acceptance — by sitting with your eyes closed in a course-room full of strangers, you lower your defenses" and that bullbait "dissociates emotional responses and has a robotizing effect".

== See also ==
- List of Scientology Security Checks
- Scientology and hypnosis
