= Scientology cross =

Religious symbol for Scientology

The eight-pointed Scientology cross

The Scientology cross is one of the principal symbols of Scientology. It is most often used to represent the Church of Scientology. The cross bears some resemblance to the Christian cross but differs from it with the addition of four diagonal rays between the conventional horizontal and vertical arms. The eight points of the cross represent the eight dynamics in Scientology, the eight divisions of urges towards survival:

1. One's self as an individual
2. Sex, procreation, family
3. Groups, society, community
4. Species survival (humankind)
5. Life forms in general
6. The physical universe: matter, energy, space & time
7. Spirits (self or others as a spiritual being)
8. Infinity or Supreme being

According to Ability magazine, a sand casting depicting a cross was dug up by L. Ron Hubbard in the mid-1950s, the model of which "came from a very ancient Spanish mission in Arizona". This cross came to be the new minister insignia besides the formal ceremonial medallion and ribbon. He also occasionally referred to it as the "sunburst cross". Scholars speculate the Scientology cross may have been inspired by Aleister Crowley's use of the Rose Cross.

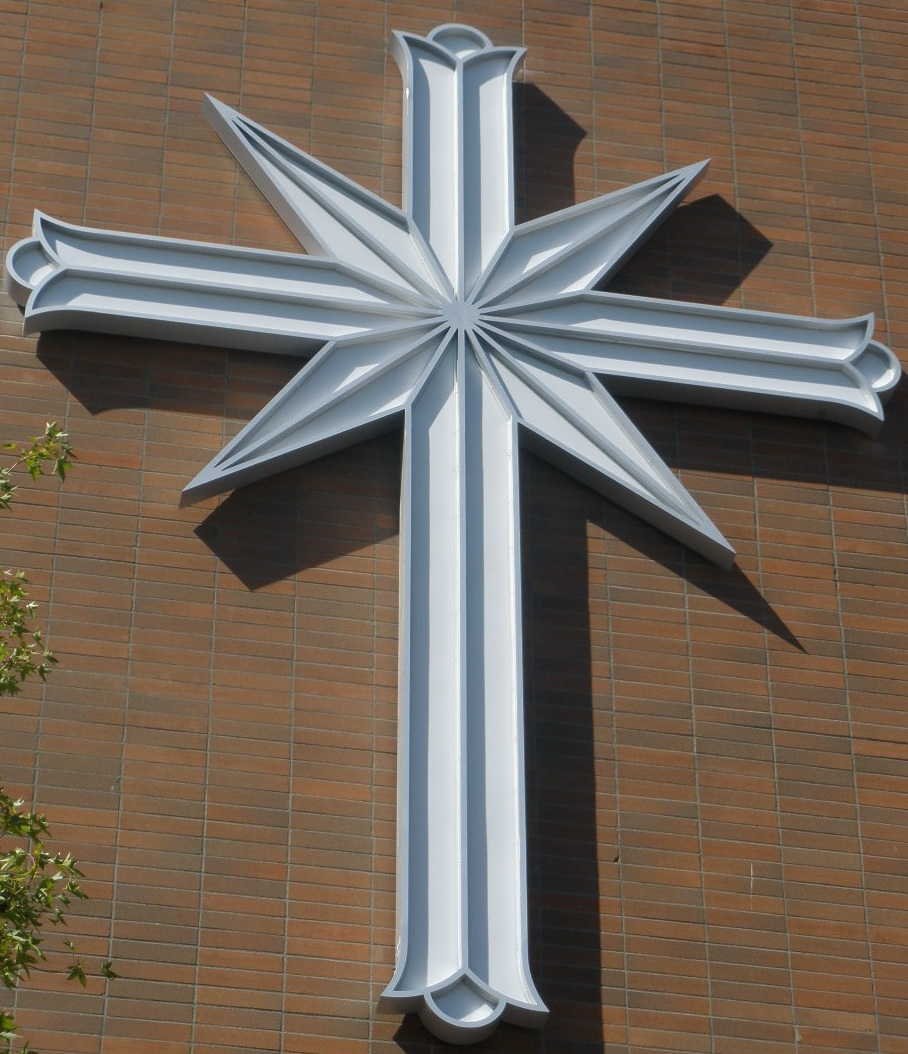
Scientology cross on a Church of Scientology building

The practice of prominently displaying the cross in Scientology centers was instituted in 1969 following hostile press coverage in the United Kingdom and elsewhere, when Scientology's status as a legitimate religion was being questioned. In response, Hubbard ordered that, "Any staff who are trained at any level as auditors (but not in AOs) are to be clothed in the traditioned ministerial black suit, black vest white collar silver cross for ordinary org wear."

== See also ==
- Scientology symbols
- Scientology and Christianity
- Scientology and the occult
- Crucifix
