= Scientology and the occult =

Scientology is in part derived from, and shares elements with, a number of esoteric or occult systems. The extent of the influence of specific occult belief systems on Scientology is a subject of debate amongst scholars.

The eight-pointed Rose Cross, a symbol used in the Hermetic Order of the Golden Dawn. Scholars speculate the Scientology cross may have been inspired by Aleister Crowley's use of the Rose Cross.

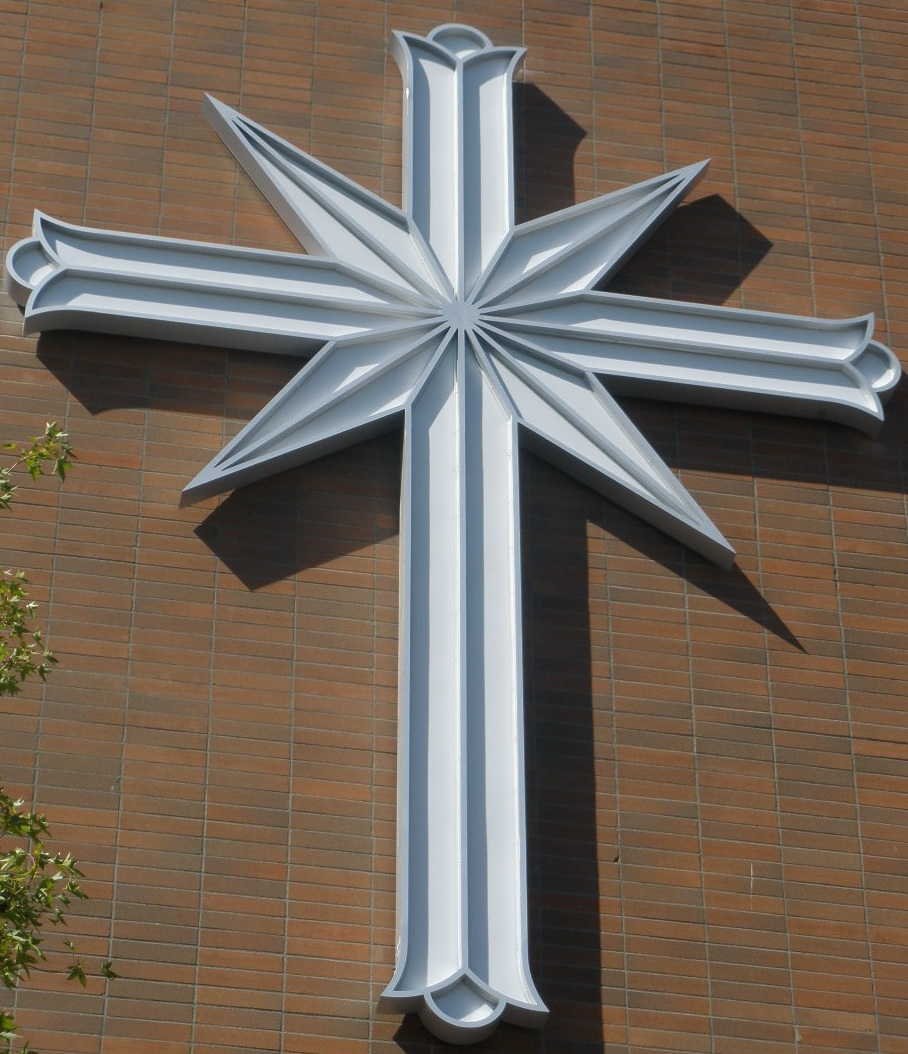
The eight-pointed Scientology cross

Scientology founder L. Ron Hubbard claimed to have had a near-death experience in 1938 that inspired him to write Excalibur, an unpublished manuscript based on the revelations from the experience. In 1945–46, Hubbard was involved with and defrauded Jack Parsons, an American rocketry pioneer who was also a devoted Thelemite and member of the Agape Lodge of Aleister Crowley's magical order, Ordo Templi Orientis, in Pasadena, California. In 1950, Hubbard published Dianetics: The Modern Science of Mental Health, and in 1953 he organized the Church of Scientology.

Hugh B. Urban, a scholar on religion who has written much about Scientology, writes that while some writers – such as Jon Atack – assert that Crowley's ideas on magic are at the core of Scientology, others – including Roy Wallis and J. Gordon Melton – have dismissed the connection between occultism and the Church. He argues further that the occult elements are combined with concepts in Eastern religions, science fiction, popular psychology and Hubbard's own thoughts, while confirming that there is one element that is related to the occult in Scientology.

== Hubbard's early interest in the occult ==
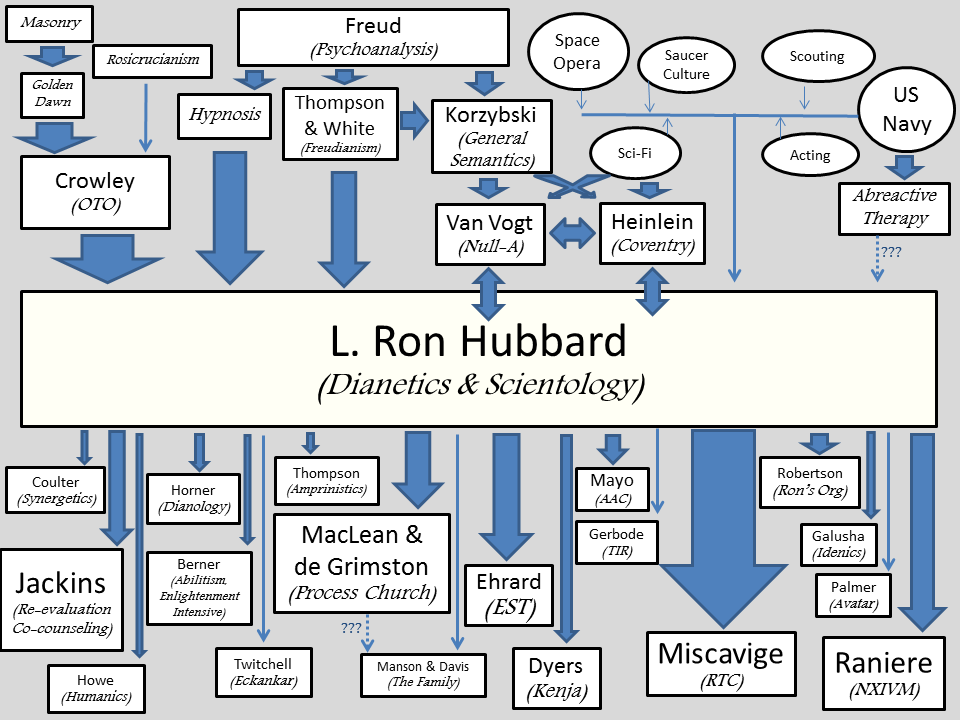
Hubbard's beliefs and practices, drawn from a diverse set of sources, influenced numerous offshoots, splinter-groups, and new movements.

Hubbard's eldest son, Ronald DeWolf, related a story that L. Ron Hubbard had "first discovered Magick" at the age of sixteen when he read Aleister Crowley's The Book of the Law. Author Jon Atack reports that Hubbard joined the Rosicrucian order Ancient and Mystical Order Rosae Crucis (AMORC) in 1940, completing the first two neophyte degrees. According to Atack, Hubbard's membership lapsed on July 5, 1940. Although the details are not known to the public, it appears as though Hubbard was sued by AMORC for breach of contract after the advent of Scientology, with AMORC arguing that the terms within Hubbard's contract stated that he would not re-sell or distribute what he had learned within their order; and that he had indeed done so.

== Near-death experience and Excalibur ==
In April 1938, Hubbard reportedly had a bad reaction to a drug during a dental procedure. According to his account, this caused a near-death experience. Allegedly inspired by this experience, Hubbard composed a manuscript, which was never published, with working titles of "The One Command" or Excalibur. The contents of Excalibur formed the basis for some of his later publications.

Arthur J. Burks, who read the work in 1938, later recalled it discussed the "one command": to survive, a theme that Hubbard revisited in Dianetics: The Modern Science of Mental Health. Burks also recalled that the work discussed the psychology of a lynch mob. Hubbard cited Excalibur as an early version of Dianetics: The Modern Science of Mental Health.

== Aleister Crowley's magical order ==
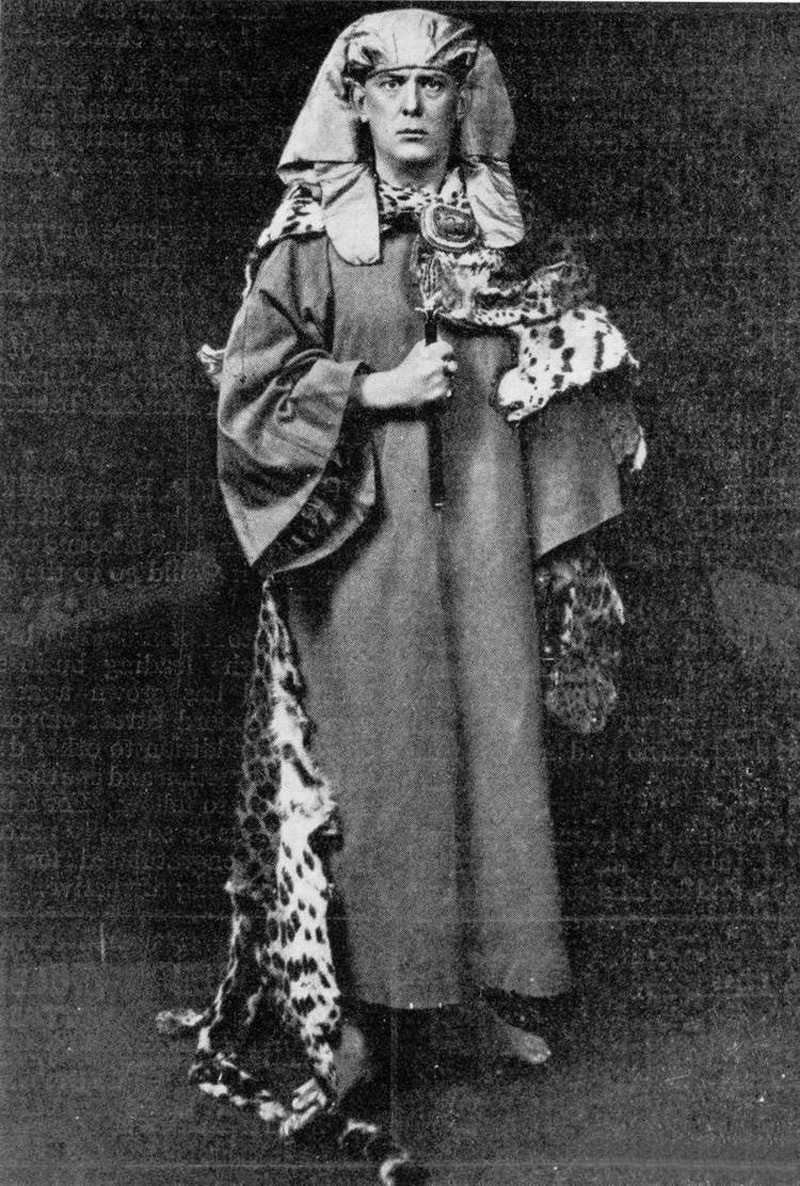
Aleister Crowley in Golden Dawn garb

In August 1945 Hubbard moved into the Pasadena mansion of John "Jack" Whiteside Parsons, an avid occultist and Thelemite, follower of the English ceremonial magician Aleister Crowley and leader of a lodge of Crowley's magical order, Ordo Templi Orientis (OTO). Parsons and Hubbard collaborated on the "Babalon Working", a sex magic ritual intended to summon an incarnation of Babalon, the supreme Thelemite Goddess.

According to religious studies scholar Hugh Urban, Parsons' own account of the period, The Book of Babalon, describes the workings as occult ceremonies requiring a woman to take part in sexual rites meant to bring about the birth of a spiritual being sometimes described in Thelemic literature as a "moonchild" – a supernatural offspring "mightier than all the kings of the Earth". Parsons viewed Hubbard as being unusually sensitive to occult forces and brought him into the project as an active collaborator. He assigned Hubbard the role of "Scribe", responsible for channelling messages attributed to Babalon. One ritual account from March 1946 describes Hubbard speaking in the goddess's voice, portraying her as the "flame of life, power of darkness" who "feeds upon the death of men".

In 1969, The Sunday Times published an exposé by Australian journalist Alex Mitchell detailing Hubbard's experiences with Parsons and the OTO. In its response, the Church of Scientology acknowledged that these rites had taken place and claimed that Hubbard's involvement had been an effort to rescue Sara "Betty" Northrup – Parsons's 21-year-old girlfriend, with whom Hubbard had also had a sexual relationship.

== Hubbard's experience with hypnosis ==
Hubbard was known to his associates in the late 1940s as a talented hypnotist. During this period, he worked in Hollywood posing as a swami. The Church says that Hubbard's experience with hypnosis led to his discovery of the principles of Dianetics as a technique for solving man's problems.

== Affirmations ==
The "Affirmations" is a document purportedly written by Hubbard in the late 1940s, a few years before he established Dianetics (1950) or Scientology (1952). The Affirmations appear to have been intended to be used as a form of self-hypnosis.

Many suggestions encourage Hubbard to believe in his own occult powers:

- "That I believe in my gods and spiritual things."
- "That my magical work is powerful and effective."
- "You are psychic."

Several suggestions reference a guardian spirit:

- "You can do automatic writing whenever you wish. You do not care what comes out on the paper when your Guardian dictates."
- "Nothing can intervene between you and your Guardian. She cannot be displaced because she is too powerful. She does not control you. She advises you."
- "The most thrilling thing in your life is your love and consciousness of your Guardian."
- "You can talk with her and audibly hear her voice above all others."

Another suggestion involves numerology: "That the numbers 7, 25 and 16 are not unlucky or evil for me."

Scholars have noted that the Affirmations contain themes that reappeared later in Scientology. One Affirmation foreshadows Hubbard's future interest in mental healing: "You understand all the workings of the minds of humans around you, for you are a doctor of minds, bodies and influences." Lawrence Wright suggests "Hubbard is using techniques on himself that he would later develop into Dianetics." He draws parallels with the practice of "auditing" used in Dianetics and Scientology, noting that the Affimations and Dianetics both involve tackling difficult memories that hold back mental and spiritual progress.

The Affirmations became public knowledge during the 1984 lawsuit against Hubbard's former archivist, Gerald Armstrong. In that settlement, Armstrong was required to return "all originals and copies of the documents commonly known as the 'Affirmations' written by L. Ron Hubbard". As religious studies scholar Hugh Urban comments, "here the church clearly indicates that the text was written by L. Ron Hubbard, and it seems difficult to understand why the church would file suit to retain ownership of the text were it not an authentic document."

== Dianetics ==
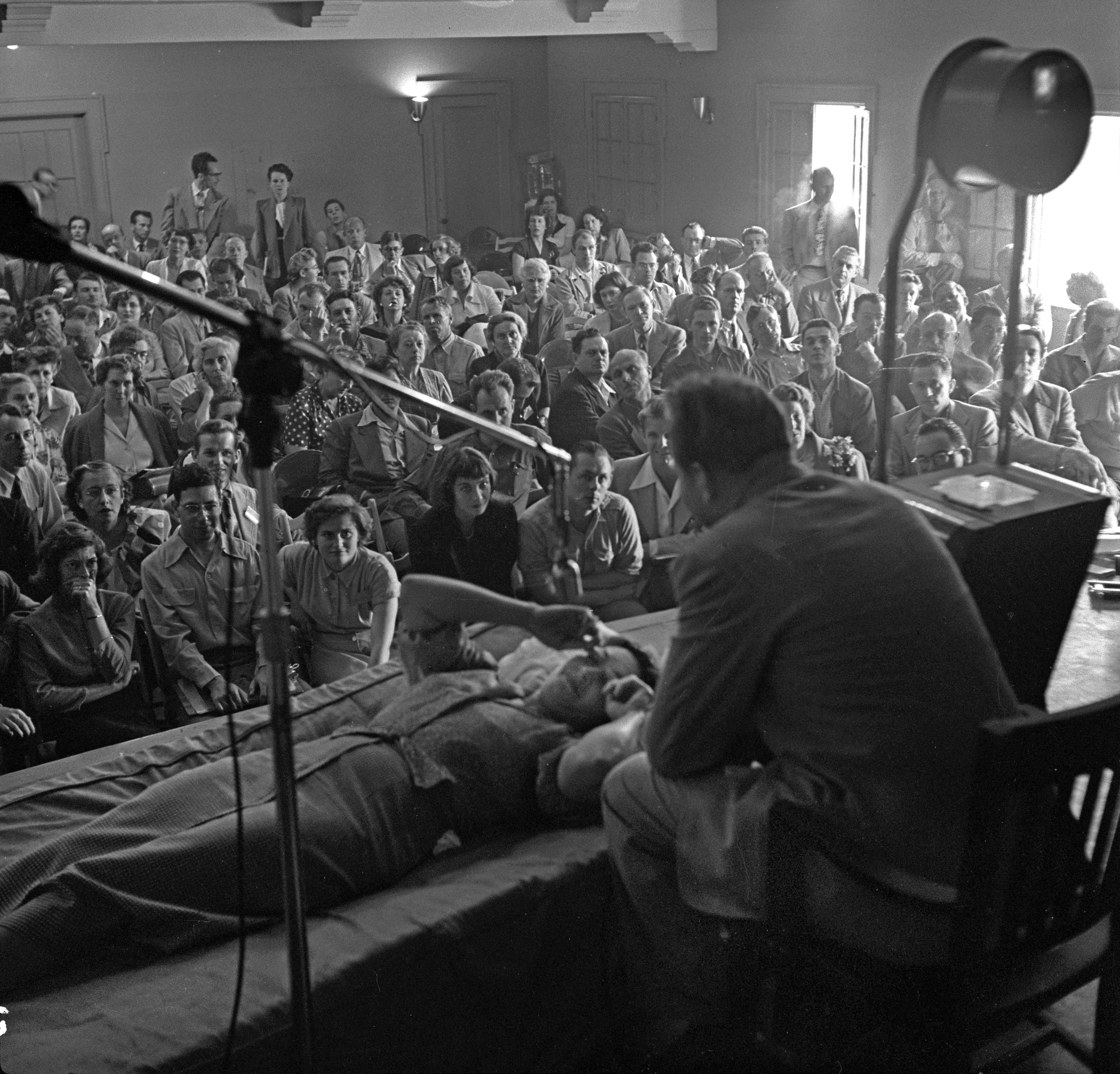
Hubbard conducting a Dianetics seminar in Los Angeles in 1950

In Spring 1949, Hubbard and his wife moved to Bay Head, New Jersey, residing at 666 East Ave.

In a 1949 letter to Forrest Ackerman, Hubbard promises his upcoming work will give Ackerman the power to "rape women without their knowing it, communicate suicide messages to your enemies as they sleep, sell the Arroyo Seco Parkway to the mayor for cash, evolve the best way of protecting or destroying communism". Hubbard admits he has "not decided whether to destroy the Catholic church or merely start a new one."

In 1950, Hubbard published an article entitled "Dianetics: the Evolution of a Science" in the magazine Astounding Science Fiction. In that article, Hubbard discusses the use of hypnosis, automatic writing, automatic speaking, and clairvoyance.

Jon Atack has noted Hubbard seems to have a special interest in the Roman goddess 'Diana'. In 1946, using money from Jack Parsons, Hubbard purchased a boat named "Diane". In 1952, Hubbard named his daughter Diana. Later, Hubbard named a Sea Org vessel 'Diana'. Atack speculates "Dianetics" might be a 'double-entendre', and notes the existence of the earlier occult practice of Dianism.

== Philadelphia Doctorate Course ==
In December 1952, Hubbard recorded a series of audio lectures in which he connects Crowleyite magical rituals and the practice of Scientology. Hubbard explains the use of Tarot, and discusses "the magic cults" of the 8th-12th centuries. He recommends The Master Therion as "the only modern work that has anything to do with them". He describes the book's author, Aleister Crowley, as "my very good friend," though there is some question about his intent in this remark because Hubbard never met Crowley personally. Hubbard also explains that Crowley signs himself "The Beast"; "The Mark of the Beast, 666."

In The Book of the Law, Crowley wrote "The whole and sole object of all true magickal training is to become free from every kind of limitation." Hubbard repurposed this for his movement, lecturing that "Our whole activity tends to make an individual completely independent of any type of limitation.... Old Aleister Crowley had some interesting things to say about this. He wrote the Book of the Law." Ronald DeWolf, Hubbard's eldest son, wrote that "In preparation for the next day's lecture, [Hubbard]'d pace the floor, exhilarated by this or that passage from Aleister Crowley's writings."

During the Philadelphia course, Hubbard jokes that he is the "Prince of Darkness", which is met with laughter from the audience.

== "Heidi Forrester" sex incident ==
According to a former member of the Sea Organization pseudonymously named "Heidi Forrester", in late 1975 she met with "a heavy-set older man. He had reddish grey hair, slightly long in the back. He was wearing a white shirt, black pants, black tie, and black shoes, highly polished."

She recalls "He lay on top of me. As far as I can tell he had no erection. However, using his hand in some way he managed to get his penis inside me. [...] Then for the next hour he did absolutely nothing at all. I mean nothing!" Author Bent Corydon opined that the incident sounded like "Black Sex-Magic".

Afterwards, "Forrester" was ordered to magically conceive a child; When she failed to do so, she was declared to be in a state of "treason" and punished.

== "Original" OT 8 ==
Operating Thetan Level 8 is the highest level of auditing in Scientology. It is known as "The Truth Revealed". It was initially released to select high-ranking public Scientologists in 1988.

In OT VIII, dated 1980, Hubbard explains the document is intended for circulation only after his death. Its purpose is to explain the untold story of Hubbard's life's work. Hubbard explains that the reader has "undoubtedly heard pieces of data over the years that hinted at the greater untold reality of my mission here on Earth" but "the story was never written, nor spoken... It is only now that I feel it safe to release the information".

Hubbard mentions the Book of Revelation and its prophecy of a time when "an arch-enemy of Christ, referred to as the anti-Christ, will reign". According to Hubbard, the "anti-Christ represents the forces of Lucifer". Hubbard writes "My mission could be said to fulfill the Biblical promise represented by this brief anti-Christ period."

In the document, Hubbard also teaches that "the historic Jesus was not nearly the sainted figure [he] has been made out to be. In addition to being a lover of young boys and men. he was given to uncontrollable bursts of temper and hatred".

=== Authenticity ===
The document was posted to the Internet in 1995 as part of the Fishman papers. The Church of Scientology denies the document's authenticity, though notable defectors have described receiving the document as part of their training for the rank of OT VIII.

George White, a public Scientologist who had received OT VIII in the summer of 1988, says the document is authentic. Frank Oliver, a former operative with Scientology's Office of Special Affairs, discovered the document in the church's archives. Jesse Prince, former second-in-command of Scientology's Religious Technology Center, reports that OT VIII was revised after early participants were "horribly upset" by the content.

== Ronald DeWolf statements ==
External videos
- Ronald DeWolf testimony Day 1 and Day 2
- Ronald DeWolf interview (1983)
- Ronald DeWolf interviewed by Carol Randolph
- Jamie DeWolf reads grandfather's memoir

Lafayette Ronald Hubbard, Jr., Hubbard's eldest son, had been an active participant in the early days of Scientology. In 1959, he left Scientology and later took the name Ronald DeWolf.

In the mid-1980s, DeWolf gave a series of sworn statements and interviews detailing his father's history. DeWolf explained his father had been "deeply involved in the occult and black-magic." According to DeWolf, Aleister Crowley's death in 1947 was a pivotal event that led Hubbard to "take over the mantle of the Beast". DeWolf claimed that "Black magic is the inner core of Scientology", arguing that "my father did not worship Satan. He thought he was Satan."

In 2014, Jamie DeWolf (Ronald's grandson) announced the discovery of Ronald DeWolf's unpublished memoir which had been written in 1981. That work discusses the Hubbards' history of occult practices.

== See also ==
- Scientology and hypnosis
- Folk magic and the Latter Day Saint movement
- Brainwashing

== Sources ==
- Urban, Hugh (2006), Magia sexualis: Sex, magic, and liberation in modern Western esotericism, University of California Press, ISBN 9780520932883
- Urban, Hugh (2012a), "The Occult Roots of Scientology?: L. Ron Hubbard, Aleister Crowley, and the Origins of a Controversial New Religion", Nova Religio: The Journal of Alternative and Emergent Religions, 15 (3), doi:10.1525/nr.2012.15.3.91
- Urban, Hugh B. (2012b). "The Secrets of Scientology: Concealment, Information Control and soteric Knowledge in the World's Most Controversial New Religion". In Asprem, Egil; Granholm, Kennet (eds.). Contemporary Esotericism. Gnostica. Durham: Acumen Publishing. pp. 181–199. ISBN 9781908049322.
