= Sob sister =

American specialist reporters

Sob sister was an American term in the early 20th century for reporters (usually women) who specialized in newspaper articles (often called "sob stories") with emphasis on the human interest angle using language of sentimentality. The label was coined in 1907 during coverage of a scandalous murder trial that became known at the time as the "Trial of the Century".

== Origin ==
The term "sob sister" dates to 1907, when Irvin S. Cobb derided the women reporters who were covering the trial of Harry K. Thaw for murder. Sob brother was less commonly used for male reporters who wrote similar articles. By 1910, sob sister was in common use to describe any woman reporter and was sometimes used to describe women novelists such as Fanny Hurst. Years later, a review of Truman Capote's In Cold Blood described the book as "sob sister gothic".

The term was usually intended to imply that the sob sister was less than a "real" reporter, was an amateur, and that they "manufactured tears for profit". Mary Margaret McBride, who wrote for the New York Evening Mail, hated the term "sob sister", saying "The assumption that I was good for one type of story made me feel like a sort of second-class citizen."

== Thaw murder trial ==
The Thaw murder trial was the first use of the label "sob sister". Harry Thaw was accused of murdering prominent architect Stanford White for having had sex with – and allegedly raping – the teenage model and chorus girl Evelyn Nesbit a few years before she married Thaw. The four women reporters covering the Thaw trial were Winifred Black, Dorothy Dix, Nixola Greeley-Smith, and Ada Patterson.

The original sob sisters
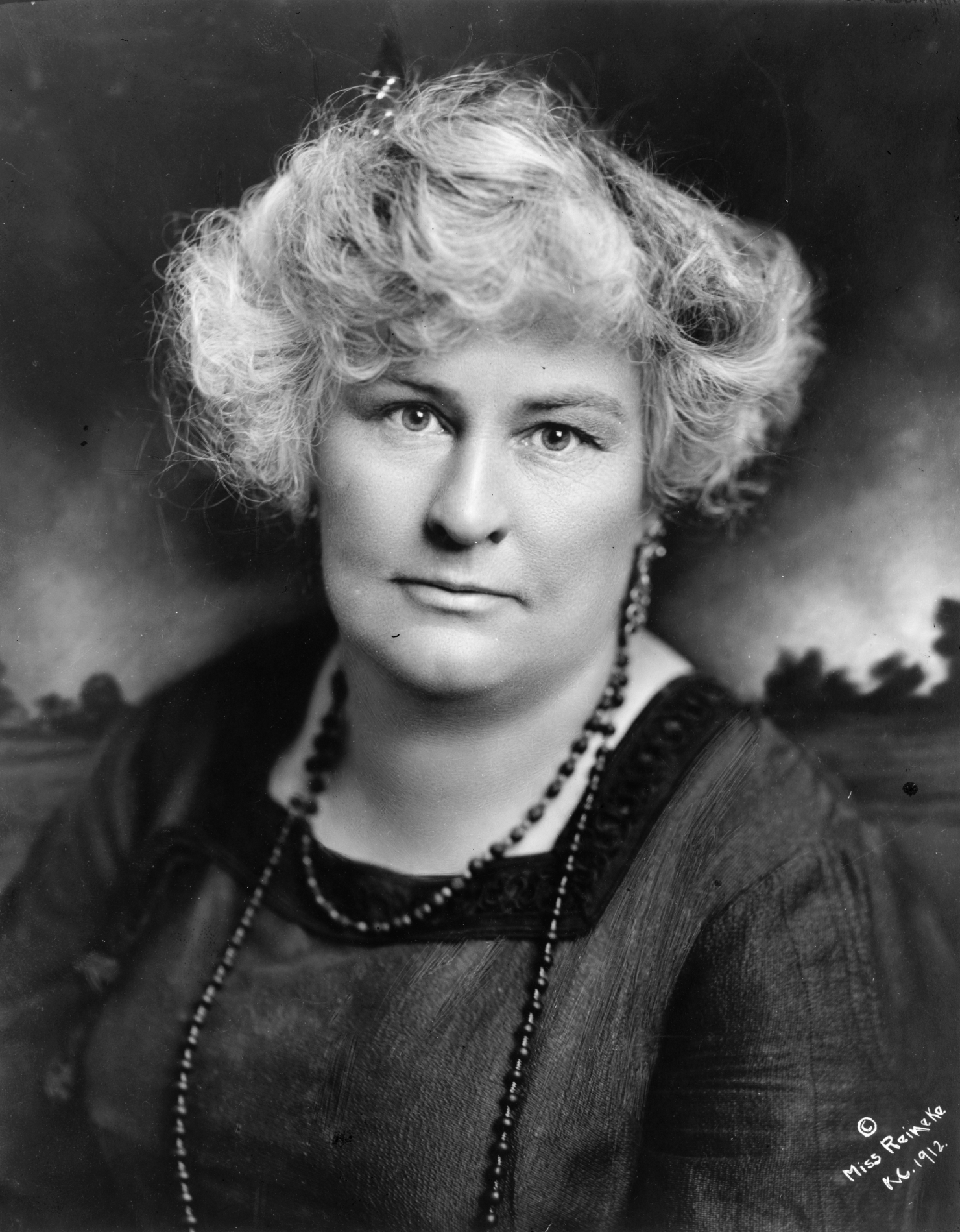
Winifred Black

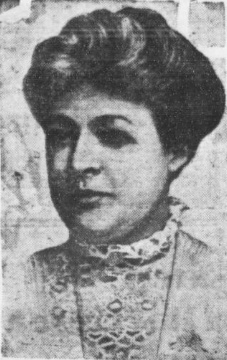
Dorothy Dix

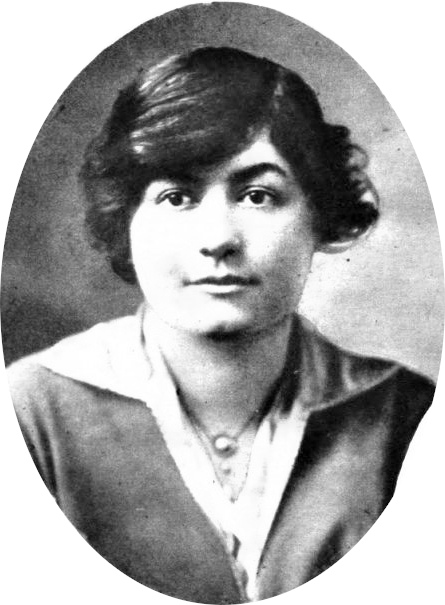
Nixola Greeley-Smith

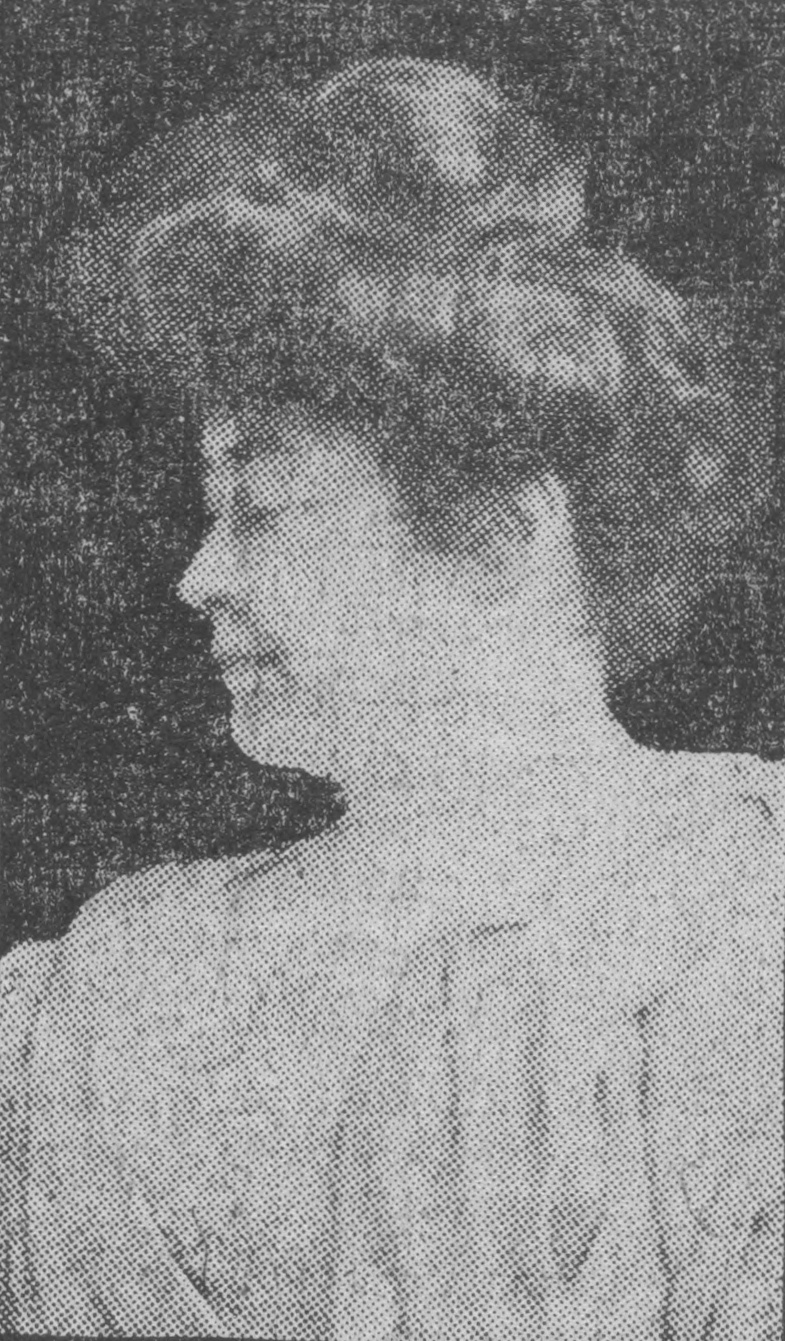
Ada Patterson

The women reporters in the courtroom were conspicuous, as no other women were permitted in the courtroom except the accused's wife, mother, sister, and two family friends. Patterson engaged with the issue of women reporters covering the trial by arguing for the value of women as potential jurors in the article "Women Juries in Future Foreseen as Real Necessity", writing "The judgement of women writers is the nearest present day approach to that actuality of the future, the women's jury".

The spectacle of the newswomen's presence in court and the publicity marketing of the "woman's view" was more responsible for the derogatory label of "sob sister" than the melodramatic style of the women reporters, which was not notably different from the writings of their male colleagues. The reporting of the Thaw trial was equally "overwrought" by both men and women reporters. An excerpt from one of Dix's articles on the Thaw trial demonstrates the sob sister approach:

In good truth, a more piteous figure than the little chorus girl and artists' model could scarcely be imagined. Gone was even the bravado of cheerfulness and nonchalance she had been trying to vainly to keep up for the past two days. She came into court looking like a flower that has been beaten down into the ground and despoiled of its beauty by a storm. Her face was sodden with weeping. Her eyes red rimmed and swollen. Her face showed white and wan under the black veil in which she had tried to shroud it. She had seemed sad and miserable before. She appeared absolutely crushed, and as if there was no spirit left in her.

From the same trial, a male reporter, William Hoster, wrote in similar sob-sister style:

Throwing aside all modesty and pride, sinking every feeling to woman dear, baring her bleeding heart to the world—Evelyn Nesbit Thaw flung wide open the book of her tragic life, that all might read. A tremendous sacrifice, and a soul-crushing story. But in the hour of deepest woe, the girl wife of Harry Kendall Thaw has this consolation, which will be all sufficient balm to her broken heart,—she has probably saved the life of her husband.

== Marketing and reputation ==
Women journalists in the nineteenth century were generally restricted to social reporting and to topics of interest to women, such as suffrage and temperance. Yellow and tabloid journalism outlets such as the New York Evening Journal included "women's pages" to increase readership and circulation. Sob sisters tended to write for those types of publication because, seeking wider mass-market appeal, the yellow press were more likely to hire women. The approach of sob sister journalism was marketed as "womanly sympathy", appealing to nineteenth century gender roles.

As well-known sob sisters gained a pseudo-celebrity, newspaper publishers played them up to increase circulation. Publishers promoted their sob sisters more aggressively than their male columnists, using larger pictures of the women reporters and repeating their names in the headline, as a byline, and as a caption for the photo.

The tear-jerking writing style of the sob sister was often combined with stunt journalism, such as when "Annie Laurie" pretended to faint in the street to do an investigative report of a local hospital. Of the sob sisters, Dorothy Dix had the greatest sustained popularity. In the mid-1930s, Godfrey Winn began to write for The Mirror, replacing its gossip page with articles about real people, becoming "the first great sob-sister" in British journalism.

Investigative reporting by sob sisters resulted in changes to institutions and policies. Articles by "Annie Laurie" led to the establishment of an ambulance service in San Francisco; changes to the treatments for female patients at San Francisco Receiving Hospital; a ward for incurables at the San Francisco Children's Hospital; and financial donations for the leper colony on Molokai and for Galveston after the 1900 hurricane.

Hollywood movies featuring sob sisters tended to portray them as women who had to mask their femininity to compete in the cutthroat world of journalism or as vamps playing on their sexuality to get a story. The 1975 musical Chicago goes further and portrays the sob sister covering the main story, Mary Sunshine, as a pantomime dame—a man in drag waiting for acquittal so he can become their promoter. Decades later, sob sister journalism played a part in the Sam Sheppard murder trial. Advice columns, gossip sheets, and even soap operas have made use of the principles and style of the sob sisters.

== Notable sob sisters ==
- Bessie Beatty
- Winifred Black
- Winifred Bonfils
- Emma Bugbee
- Mary Chase
- Dorothy Dix
- Nixola Greeley-Smith
- Ione Quinby Griggs
- Fannie Hurst
- Mary Margaret McBride
- Ada Patterson
- Polly Pry
- Godfrey Winn

== See also ==
- Agony aunt
- Rage-baiting
- Women in journalism
