= Armstrong cases =

Lawsuits to suppress disclosing Hubbard documents

Church of Scientology of California, plaintiff, joined by Mary Sue Hubbard, plaintiff-in-intervention v. Gerald Armstrong
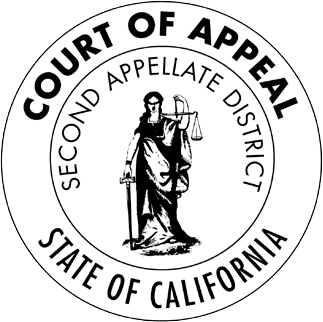
- Court: Court of Appeal of the State of California, 2nd District, 3rd Division
- Full case name: Church of Scientology of California, plaintiff, and Mary Sue Hubbard, plaintiff-in-intervention, v. Gerald Armstrong
- Docket nos.: B025920 & B038975
- Citations: 232 Cal. App. 3d 1060 (1991); 283 Cal. Rptr. 917 Church of Scientology v. Armstrong.

Case history
- Appealed from: Church of Scientology v. Armstrong, Superior Court of Los Angeles County, №C420153

Church of Scientology International v. Superior Court of Marin County, respondent, and Gerald Armstrong, real party in interest
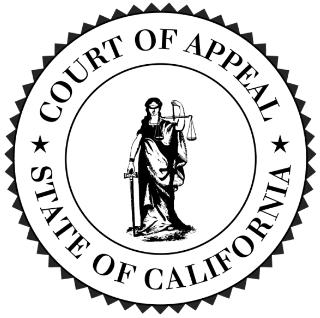
- Court: Court of Appeal of the State of California, 1st District, 4th Division
- Citations: Not Reported in Cal. Rptr. 3d (Cal. App. 1 Dist.) Church of Scientology International v. Superior Court.

Case history
- Subsequent action: Certiorari to the Supreme Court of California denied over the objection of Kennard, J.: Cal. S139389

Armstrong I–VIII (Note: All eventually consolidated into two cases: Church of Scientology of California v. Gerald Armstrong and Church of Scientology Int'l v. Superior Court of the County of Marin.) were a lengthy series of lawsuits and other legal actions, primarily in the California state courts, arising from Gerald Armstrong's departure from the Church of Scientology (COS). The COS argued that Armstrong, a former COS employee, improperly took private papers belonging to the Church, while Armstrong argued that he took the papers to protect himself from improper disciplinary proceedings and that the Church did, in fact, discipline him improperly.

== Chronology of dispute and litigation ==
=== 1969–1981: Armstrong's discovery of COS documents and departure from the Church of Scientology ===
According to the August 10, 1984, judgment in the Armstrong litigation, the circumstances of Armstrong's departure from the Church are as follows. (The COS disputes this account and argues that testimony in other actions impeaches it).

- Gerald Armstrong was a member of the Church of Scientology for 12 years, from 1969 to 1981. From approximately 1971 to 1981, Armstrong was a member of the Sea Organization, an "elite group of Scientologists working directly under Church Founder L. Ron Hubbard." In 1979, Armstrong became part of Hubbard's "Household Unit" at Gold Base in Gilman Hot Springs, California.
- In January 1980, COS representatives ordered that all documents at the Gilman facility showing Hubbard's control of Scientology organizations, funds, or property be shredded. While inspecting documents for shredding, Armstrong discovered a box of early Hubbard letters, diaries, and other writings. Armstrong requested and was granted authorization to conduct research for a planned biography of Hubbard, and ultimately discovered and preserved 500,000-600,000 documents.
- Armstrong became the research assistant for Omar Garrison, Hubbard's authorized biographer. During his work on that project, Armstrong began to note discrepancies between the information in the documents and Hubbard's previous representations. This led to a conflict with church officials.
- In November 1981, Armstrong wrote a report arguing for increased accuracy in published materials relating to L. Ron Hubbard and offering examples of previously published but inaccurate information.
- In December 1981, Armstrong and his wife left the Church, both as members and employees. Before leaving, Armstrong copied a number of Church documents, which he delivered to Garrison for use in the biography.
- Beginning in February 1982, the COS issued a number of documents declaring Armstrong a "suppressive person" and enemy of the Church and declaring Armstrong subject to the "fair game" doctrine.
- Fearing for his life and safety, Armstrong retrieved a number of Church documents from Garrison and delivered them to his attorney.

== Ruling ==
Church of Scientology of California v. Gerald Armstrong, 232 Cal. App. 3d 1060; 283 Cal. Rptr. 917 (Ct. App. 1991)s:Church of Scientology v. Armstrong

Background: The COS filed an appeal seeking to overturn prior orders (1) dismissing its claims against Armstrong and (2) ordering that the court records in previous litigation be unsealed. (Armstrong, 232 Cal. App. 3d at 1063-66; 283 Cal. Rptr. at 918-20)

Holding:

1. The court of appeals upheld the trial court decision dismissing the COS's claims against Armstrong. Although not previously discussed under California law, the court of appeals agreed with the trial court that Armstrong's fears for his life, safety, and the life and safety of his wife presented a self-defense justification to the COS claims of invasion of privacy and conversion. (Armstrong, 232 Cal. App. 3d at 1071-73; 283 Cal. Rptr. at 923-25).
2. The court of appeals reversed a lower court order unsealing the records from the original Armstrong proceeding. The court held that the original record was sealed with the consent of both parties, and, with retirement of the original judge, no subsequent judge had the authority to vacate or modify the order sealing the records. (Armstrong, 232 Cal. App. 3d at 1068-70; 283 Cal. Rptr. at 921-22).
3. However, the court refused to seal the appellate record, holding that it was not bound by the original order sealing the lower court record and that no showing had been made sufficient to justify sealing the record of the appeal itself. (Armstrong, 232 Cal. App. 3d at 1070-71; 283 Cal. Rptr. at 923-24).

== Post-litigation events ==
After this 1991 decision, COS sued Armstrong in 1995 and 2002 for allegedly violating the confidentiality agreement. A California appellate court awarded damages to COS of $321,923 and attorneys fees of $334,671.75 in 1995, and $500,000 in damages in 2004. The court noted that "Armstrong makes no claim that he has complied, or will ever comply, with the injunction" and that Armstrong claims to now reside in Canada. Church of Scientology v. Superior Court, not reported in Cal.Rptr.3d (Cal.App. 1 Dist.), 2-7 s:Church of Scientology International v. Superior Court

== See also ==
- Scientology controversy
- Fair game (Scientology)
- Scientology and the legal system
