= Noisy investigation =

Scientology harassment practice

Noisy investigations are used by the Church of Scientology to intimidate, harass, and attack those they see as their enemies. The purpose of a noisy investigation is not to discover anything particular about the targeted individual. The procedure is to contact friends, neighbors, co-workers, and anyone connected with the target, and tell those contacts that they are investigating crimes by the targeted person. The Church of Scientology usually hires private investigators to perform noisy investigations.

OSA has carried on many of the same undercover operations, though now often farming them out to independent private investigators who cannot be linked directly back to the Church of Scientology: "Private detectives have simply replaced church members as agents of intimidation. The detectives are especially valued because they insulate the church from deceptive and potentially embarrassing investigative tactics that the church in fact endorses."

— Hugh Urban in The Church of Scientology: A History of a New Religion

In 1966, L. Ron Hubbard wrote a policy titled "How to do a NOISY Investigation" explaining the procedure:

You find out where he or she works or worked, doctor, dentist, friends, neighbours, anyone, and 'phone 'em up and say, 'I am investigating Mr/Mrs .......... for criminal activities as he/she has been trying to prevent Man's freedom and is restricting my religious freedom and that of my friends and children, etc'.

A memo, reprinted in the British paper "People", said: "We want at least one bad mark on every psychiatrist in England, a murder, an assault, or a rape or more than one.... This is Project Psychiatry. We will remove them."

The Church of Scientology used to openly label their enemies as fair game. Though Scientologists claim that the policy of "fair game" is no longer in effect, critics of the Church maintain that fair game is still practiced today. Detractors of Scientology have claimed that the cancellation of the policy only cancelled the use of the words "fair game" but did not change the actual practice. (Note: Quote: "Church spokesmen maintain that Hubbard rescinded the policy three years after it was written ... But various judges and juries have concluded that while the actual labelling of persons as 'fair game' was abandoned, the harassment continued unabated. ... Numerous other church detractors have said in court documents and interviews that they, too, were victims of fair game tactics even after the policy supposedly was abandoned.")

== See also ==
- Dead agenting
- Suppressive person
- Fair game (Scientology)
- R2-45
