= Ada Patterson =

American journalist (1867–1939)

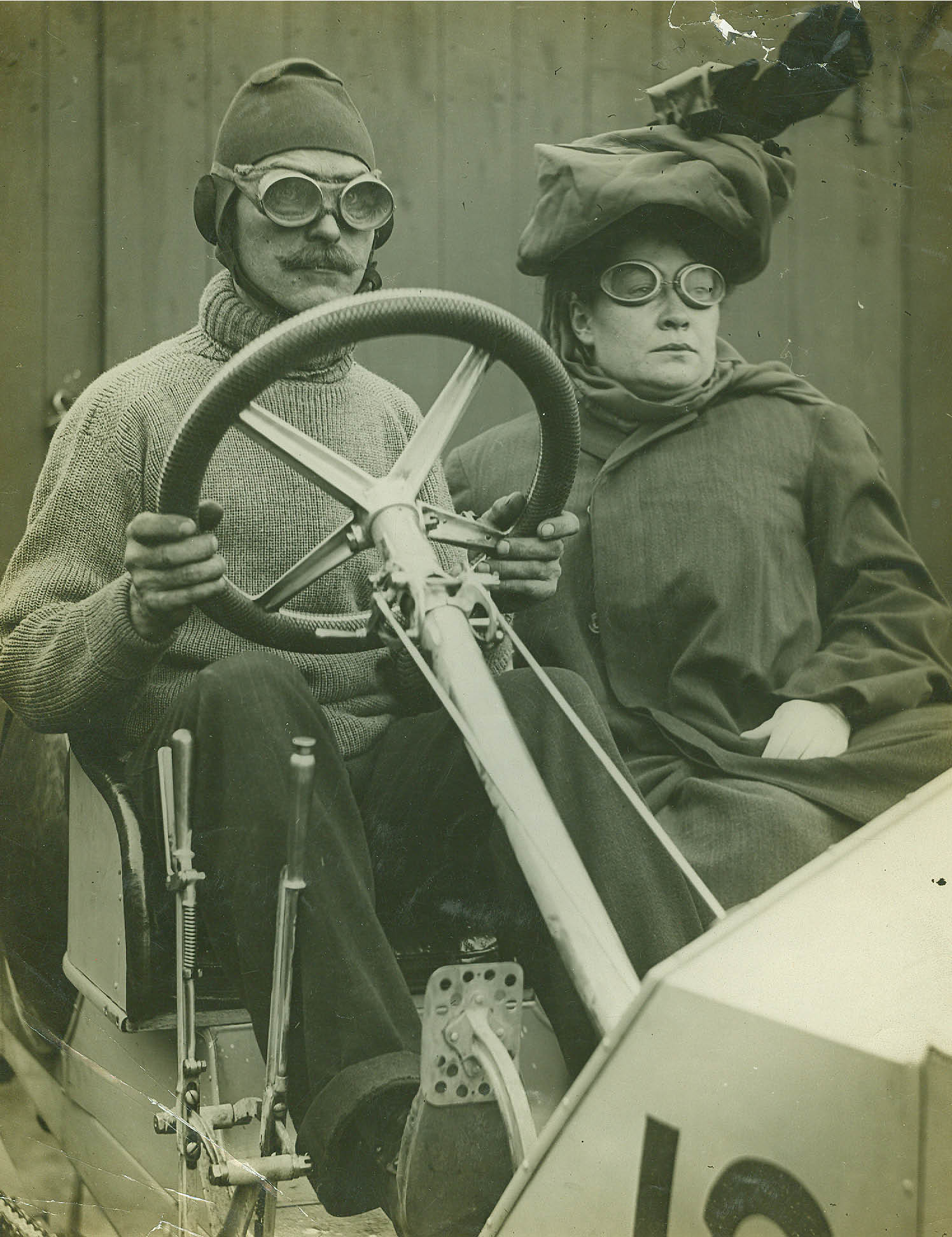
- Patterson in a race car, reporting on the 1905 Vanderbilt Cup
- Born: 5 July 1867; Mount Joy, Pennsylvania
- Died: 26 June 1939 (aged 71)
- Occupation: Journalist

Ada Patterson (5 July 1867 – 26 June 1939) was an American print journalist.

== Early life ==
Patterson was born in Mount Joy, Pennsylvania, and received her education at Franklin Academy in Franklin, Nebraska.

== Career ==
Patterson wrote for the St. Louis Republican, where she was dubbed "the Nellie Bly of the West". She also wrote for the Salt Lake Herald, the San Francisco Call, and the New York American. For several years, Patterson also wrote a column in Theatre Magazine, which she signed as "The Lady with the Lorgnette".

Patterson covered a number of notable murder trials, including those of Anne Madison Bradley (charged with the murder of Utah Senator Arthur Brown) and Charles Becker. Patterson covered the trial of Harry Kendall Thaw along with three other women (Winifred Black, Dorothy Dix, Nixola Greeley-Smith) and together, they were given the dismissive nickname of the "sob sisters." The phrase became a term of derision for other female journalists, who were believed to be overly emotional or compassionate.

Patterson wrote a biography of Maude Adams By the Stage Door and co-wrote a Broadway play, Love's Lightning, with Robert Edeson.

== Bibliography ==
- By the Stage Door. New York, The Grafton press, 1902.
