= Question Hour to the President of the European Commission =

The first Question Hour to the President of the European Commission was held in the European Parliament sitting in Strasbourg on 20 October 2009 with President of the European Commission José Manuel Barroso taking questions. From then on, it was held monthly whenever the Parliament sat in Strasbourg.

== See also ==
- Question time
