= Smear campaign =

Effort to damage someone's reputation

A smear campaign, also referred to as a smear tactic or simply a smear, is an effort to damage or call into question someone's reputation, by propounding negative propaganda. It makes use of discrediting tactics. It can be applied to individuals or groups. Common targets are public officials, politicians, heads of state, political candidates, activists, celebrities (especially those who are involved in politics), and ex-spouses. The term also applies in other contexts, such as the workplace. The term smear campaign became popular around the year 1936.

== Definition ==
A smear campaign is an intentional, premeditated effort to undermine an individual's or group's reputation, credibility, and character. Like negative campaigning, most often smear campaigns target government officials, politicians, political candidates, and other public figures. However, public relations campaigns might also employ smear tactics in the course of managing an individual or institutional brand to target competitors and potential threats.

Smear campaigns can also be used as a campaign tactic associated with tabloid journalism, which is a type of journalism that presents little well-researched news and instead uses eye-catching headlines, scandal-mongering and sensationalism. For example, during Gary Hart's 1988 presidential campaign (see below), the New York Post reported on its front page big, black block letters: "GARY: I'M NO WOMANIZER."

Deflection has been described as a wrap-up smear: "You make up something. Then you have the press write about it. And then you say, everybody is writing about this charge".

== Examples ==
Smear tactics are commonly used to undermine effective arguments or critiques.

=== John C. Frémont – 1856 US presidential election candidate ===
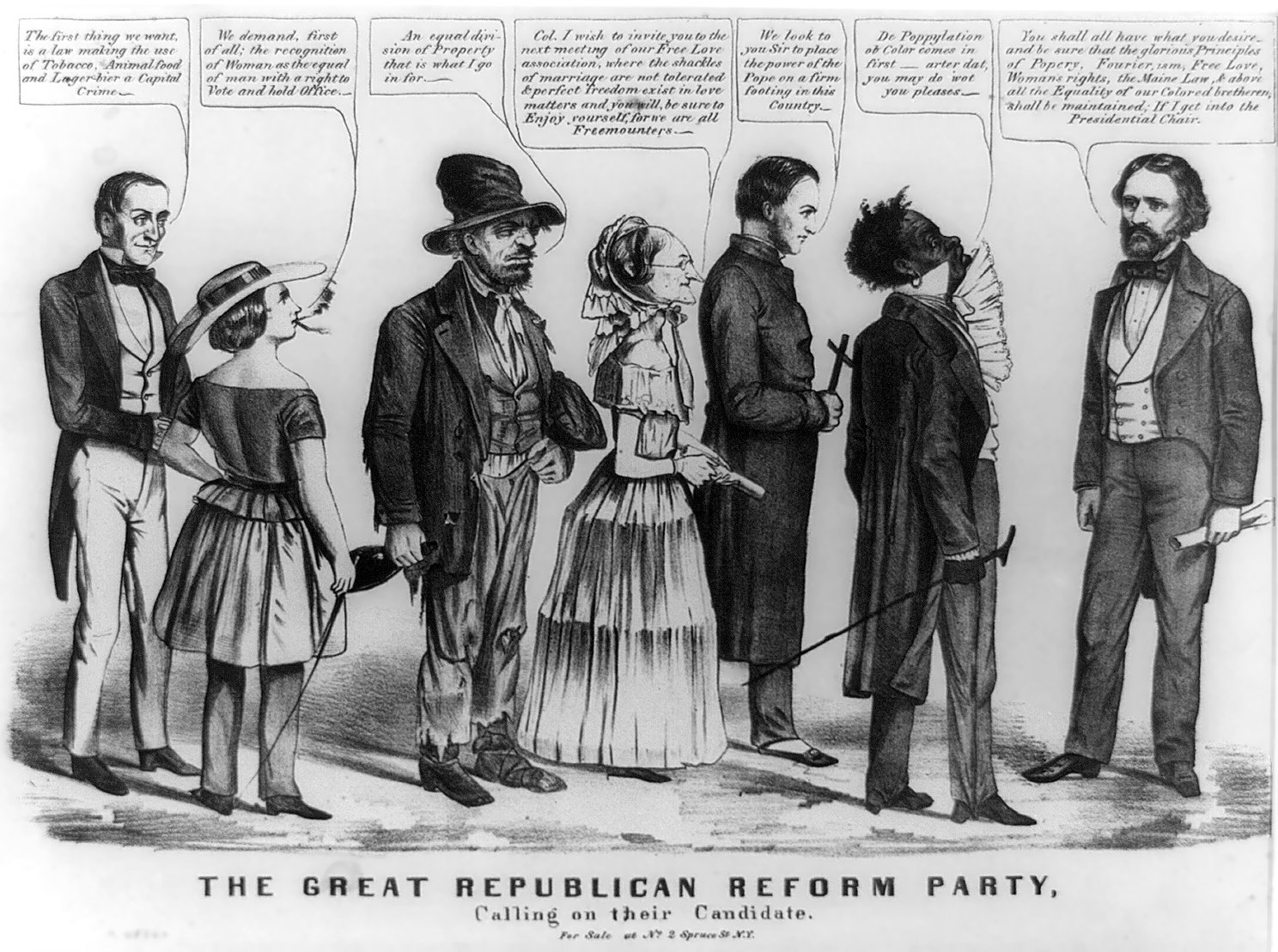
"The Great Republican Reform Party Calling on their Candidate", an 1856 political cartoon in which various "extremists", including a Catholic, press John C. Frémont, the first Republican party candidate for president of the United States, for their respective causes. There was a political campaign smear rumor current in 1856 that Fremont was a Catholic.

During the 1856 presidential election, John C. Frémont was the target of a smear campaign alleging that he was a Catholic, among other accusations. The campaign was designed to undermine support for Fremont from those who were suspicious of Catholics.

=== General Motors against Ralph Nader ===
Ralph Nader was the victim of a smear campaign during the 1960s, when he was campaigning for car safety. In order to smear Nader and deflect public attention from his campaign, General Motors engaged private investigators to search for damaging or embarrassing incidents from his past. In early March 1966, several media outlets, including The New Republic and The New York Times, reported that GM had tried to discredit Nader, hiring private detectives to tap his phones and investigate his past and hiring prostitutes to trap him in compromising situations. Nader sued the company for invasion of privacy and settled the case for $425,000. Nader's lawsuit against GM was ultimately decided by the New York Court of Appeals, whose opinion in the case expanded tort law to cover "overzealous surveillance." Nader used the proceeds from the lawsuit to start the pro-consumer Center for Study of Responsive Law.

=== Gary Hart – 1988 US presidential candidate ===
Gary Hart was the target of a smear campaign during the 1988 US presidential campaign. The New York Post once reported on its front page big, black block letters: "GARY: I'M NO WOMANIZER."

=== China against Apple Inc. ===
In 2011, China launched a smear campaign against Apple, including TV and radio advertisements and articles in state-run papers. The campaign failed to turn the Chinese public against the company and its products.

=== Chris Bryant ===
Chris Bryant, a British parliamentarian, accused Russia in 2012 of orchestrating a smear campaign against him because of his criticism of Vladimir Putin. In 2017 he alleged that other British officials are vulnerable to Russian smear campaigns.

=== Overstock critics ===
In January 2007, it was revealed that an anonymous website that attacked critics of Overstock.com, including media figures and private citizens on message boards, was operated by an official of Overstock.com.

=== UAE smear campaigns ===
In 2023, The New Yorker reported that Mohamed bin Zayed was paying millions of euros to a Swiss firm, Alp Services for orchestrating a smear campaign to defame the Emirati targets, including Qatar and the Muslim Brotherhood. Under the ‘dark PR’, Alp posted false and defamatory Wikipedia entries against them. The Emirates also paid the Swiss firm to publish propaganda articles against the targets. Multiple meetings took place between the Alp Services head Mario Brero and an Emirati official, Matar Humaid al-Neyadi. However, Alp’s bills were sent directly to MbZ. The defamation campaign also targeted an American, Hazim Nada, and his firm, Lord Energy, because his father Youssef Nada had joined the Muslim Brotherhood as a teenager.

== See also ==
- Attack ad
- Cancel culture
- Character assassination
- Disinformation and misinformation
- Doxing
- Kompromat
- Mudslinging
- Noisy investigation
- Manipulation (psychology)
- Red herring
- Red-baiting
- Shame campaign
- Social undermining
- Swift boating
- Tu quoque
- Whispering campaign
