= Green Sheet =

Green Sheet may refer to:

- Green sheet (investment term), a marketing document provided for most IPOs
- Green Sheet (Milwaukee Journal), a four-page section of the Milwaukee Journal printed on green paper
- Green Sheet (filmmaking), a film recommendation system disbanded after the advent of the official MPAA ratings
- The Green Sheet, a weekly newspaper that covered Murray, Utah
