= Character assassination =

Deliberate effort to damage an individual's reputation or credibility

The term character assassination refers to a deliberate and sustained effort to damage the reputation or credibility of an individual. The term character assassination became popular around 1930.

== In politics ==
In Australian politics, a Dorothy Dixer is a rehearsed or planted question asked of a government Minister by a backbencher of their own political party during Parliamentary Question Time. While intended to enable a Minister to discuss or address concerns about the subject asked of him, a Dixer will often conclude with "Is the Minister aware of any alternative policies?" This addition allows the Minister to launch into often aggressive attacks on the opposition, which depending on the leeway offered by the Speaker (who is a member of the ruling party and thus will usually side with the Minister), can include not just attacks on Opposition policy, but attempts to character assassinate opposition members directly.

Charging an opponent with character assassination may have political benefits. In the hearings for Clarence Thomas' nomination to the Supreme Court of the United States, supporters claimed that both Clarence Thomas and Anita Hill were victims of character assassination.

== In a totalitarian regime ==
The effect of a character assassination driven by an individual is not equal to that of a state-driven campaign. The state-sponsored destruction of reputations, fostered by political propaganda and cultural mechanisms, can have more far-reaching consequences. One of the earliest signs of a society's compliance to loosening the reins on the perpetration of crimes (and even massacres) with total impunity is when a government favors or directly encourages a campaign aimed at destroying the dignity and reputation of its adversaries, and the public accepts its allegations without question. The mobilisation toward ruining the reputation of adversaries is the prelude to the mobilisation of violence in order to annihilate them. Generally, official dehumanisation has preceded the physical assault of the victims.

Specific examples include Zersetzung, by the Stasi secret service agency of East Germany, and kompromat in Russia.

== Studying the concept ==
Character assassination, as a subject of scholarly study, was originally introduced by Davis (1950) in a collection of essays revealing the dangers of political smear campaigns. Six decades later Icks and Shiraev (2014) rejuvenated the term and revived academic interest by addressing and comparing a variety of historical character-assassination events. Icks and Shiraev (2014) address several political science models to explain character assassination from the attacker's point of view. They believe that the attacker's motivation is often based on the intent to destroy the target psychologically, or to reduce their public support or chances to succeed in a political competition. For example, during elections, attacks are often used to sway undecided voters, create uncertainty with tentative voters, or prevent defections of supporters. These attacks therefore become an effective means of manipulating voters toward a desirable action. They also facilitate the repositioning of originally favorable supporters to the ranks of the "undecided" or "uncommitted" voters.

== See also ==
- Black propaganda
- Cancel culture
- Damnatio memoriae
- Fair game (Scientology)
- Hollywood blacklist
- Information warfare
- Kompromat
- Pittura infamante
- Smear campaign
- Social undermining
- Personal attack
- Zersetzung
