= Gerry Armstrong (activist) =

Hubbard biographer and whistleblower

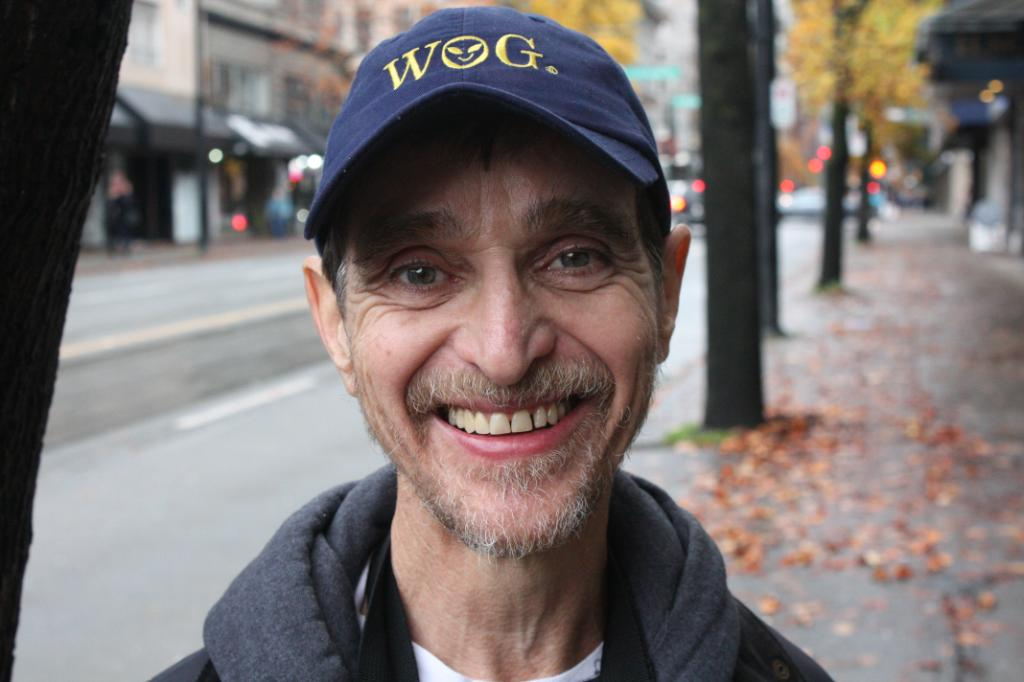
- Armstrong on November 8, 2008
- Born: Gerald Armstrong; October 18, 1946 (age 79); United States
- Website: gerryarmstrong.ca; gerryarmstrong.org

Gerald "Gerry" Armstrong is a critic of the Church of Scientology and a former member. As an archivist and assistant to L. Ron Hubbard's biographer, he discovered the truth about Hubbard's life history which impugned the Church's fantastic and idealized version. When Church management refused to correct the record, Armstrong left Scientology with copies of some of the documents. For decades he was harassed by the Church and pursued through the court systems, bankrupting him, in an attempt to keep the materials and facts undisclosed. But with each successive court case, more documents were inevitably disclosed as evidence and became part of the court's records and accessible to the public.

== Early Scientology career ==
Armstrong grew up in Chilliwack, B.C., Canada and first got involved in Scientology in 1969. In 1971, he joined the Sea Org and was sent to work on their ship, the Apollo where he rose through the ranks to become legal and then public-relations officer. He married Terry Gillham aboard the Apollo in 1974, and followed Hubbard to land the following year. He worked on Scientology training films and became part of Hubbard's household staff at Gold Base in Gilman Hot Springs, California. In the late 1970s, Armstrong was twice sentenced to hard labor in the Sea Org's penal labor camp, called the Rehabilitation Project Force.

== Hubbard biography project ==
In January 1980, in the wake of several FBI raids and Mary Sue Hubbard's criminal conviction, the Church of Scientology began shredding tens of thousands of documents they thought might tie Hubbard in any capacity to management of the Church of Scientology, or "show that Hubbard secreted millions of dollars of church money into his own accounts". Armstrong, as part of Hubbard's "Household Unit", had come across twenty boxes of personal correspondence and records that had been preserved for Hubbard over decades. He asked for permission to use these as the core of a biography project. The answer was yes.

Non-Scientologist Omar Garrison had been hired to write the book. As part of his assignment, Armstrong also obtained Hubbard's war records from the US Navy and his transcripts from George Washington University. According to Garrison's later testimony at trial, "The inconsistencies were implicit in various documents which Mr. Armstrong provided me with respect to Mr. Hubbard's curriculum vitae, with respect to his Navy career, with respect to almost every aspect of his life. These undeniable and documented facts did not coincide with the official published biography that the church had promulgated."

In all, Armstrong was able to accumulate over 500,000 pages of documents.

As published by author and journalist Janet Reitman, this represented "a trove of private letters, journals, files, and other materials that ... documented that Hubbard had lied about virtually every part of his life, including his education, degrees, family, explorations, military service, war wounds, scientific research, the efficacy of ... Dianetics and Scientology—along with the actions and intentions of the organizations [Hubbard] created to sell and advance these 'sciences.'"

During the 1984 lawsuit, the Church did not dispute the authenticity of the documents.

For a year, when Armstrong would find documents that contradicted the Church's narrative about Hubbard's background, he would explain it away in his mind. But eventually, unable to reconcile the vast amount of contradictory data, he approached Church officials to correct their narrative. Not only did they not correct the record, but in 1981 Armstrong was ordered to be security checked (enforced confessionals on an e-meter). Armstrong and his wife fled, but not before copying some of the documents which he gave to Garrison for an honest biography, and he continued for a few months to assist the biographer in locating documents.

== Harassment ==
Armstrong was declared a suppressive person and became the target of Scientology's fair game practices. In response, he copied about 10,000 pages from Garrison's collection, with permission, and deposited them with an attorney as "insurance" (leverage). Some of the fair game tactics against Armstrong included: being followed and surveilled by individuals employed by Scientology; being assaulted; being struck bodily by a car; twice involving Armstrong in a freeway automobile accident; intruding onto Armstrong's property, spying in his windows, creating disturbances, and upsetting his neighbors.

Armstrong finally began to tell me fragments of stories about being relentlessly harassed by the church, pursued by its private investigators, run off the road, targeted in elaborate sting operations, slandered at every turn by what he calls "Black PR" and "dead agent packages" and stalked through the US courts. ... Why has the Church of Scientology spent nearly three decades trying to discredit and silence this unemployed, penniless man living on a disability pension in the middle of nowhere in British Columbia? Because of what he knows.

— Bruce Livesey, Maisonneuve

Omar Garrison had continued with the biography project until 1982 when he too became the target of Scientology fair game harassment, including being followed by private detectives "bumper to bumper". In 1983, Garrison settled with the Church of Scientology which didn't want the manuscript to become public. Garrison also kept copies of the documents "to ensure the church's good behavior".

According to religious scholar Stephen A. Kent, "[Armstrong] poses a threat because he has knowledge of L. Ron Hubbard that few if any other outside critics hold. ... He was working with exclusive documents—documents of Hubbard's childhood and teenage years. Armstrong interviewed Hubbard's relatives, so he had an in-depth knowledge of Hubbard the person and how Hubbard's biography developed over time. For a person with that kind of knowledge to say that what the organization portrays about its founder is false, distorted or misleading—that's a terrible threat. ... [The Church] wants to ruin Gerry's reputation for the present and for time immemorial."

== Litigation with Church of Scientology ==
Armstrong's transfer of the Hubbard-related documents to his attorney prompted a lawsuit for theft, Church of Scientology of California vs. Gerald Armstrong. The decision in the case, by Judge Paul Breckenridge, found that Armstrong's fears of persecution by the Church were reasonable, and thus his conduct in turning over the documents in his possession to his attorney was also reasonable:

... the court is satisfied the invasion was slight, and the reasons and justification for the defendant's conduct manifest. Defendant was told by Scientology to get an attorney. He was declared an enemy by the Church. He believed, reasonably, that he was subject to "fair game." The only way he could defend himself, his integrity, and his wife was to take that which was available to him and place it in a safe harbor, to wit, his lawyer's custody.

— Judge Paul Breckenridge, Los Angeles Superior Court, June 20, 1984

This 1984 judgment that Armstrong's transfer of documents to his attorney was justified was affirmed seven years later in Church of Scientology v. Gerald Armstrong (1991).

In December 1986, the parties entered into a settlement agreement under which CSI paid Armstrong $800,000 in exchange for his dismissal of claims against CSI. Armstrong agreed to not publish orally or in writing any information about his experience with CSI, and that he would be liable for $50,000 for each breach of confidentiality. On October 17, 1995, a California court concluded that Armstrong had breached the agreement and awarded CSI $321,932 in damages and $334,671.75 in court costs. The court also enjoined Armstrong from assisting others with lawsuits against CSI.

Armstrong apparently continued to assist people with lawsuits against CSI and posting information about CSI on the Internet because on three occasions – June 1997; February 1998; and December 2000 – courts found Armstrong in contempt of its previous order and in violation of his settlement agreement. These violations resulted in $3,600 in fines and an order that he be confined in jail for 26 days. However, Armstrong claimed to be living in British Columbia, Canada, never showed up for court, and was never confined.

On April 2, 2002, CSI sued Armstrong for $10,050,000 for breaches of his settlement agreement. Armstrong admitted that he had breached the agreement more than 200 times, but claimed that parts of the agreement were illegal, unconstitutional and unenforceable. At trial on April 9, 2004, the court found that 131 breaches of the agreement did occur, but found that it would be unconscionable to "punish" Armstrong with liquidated damages in excess of the $800,000 he received as a benefit under the settlement agreement. Noting that Armstrong had previously been "sanctioned" in the sum of $300,000, the court entered judgment for CSI in the amount of $500,000.

== Viewpoints about Scientology ==
Gerry Armstrong asserts that Scientology's religious status is a false façade, and that "virtually everything that Hubbard said about his life was false". As published in Hugh Urban's The Church of Scientology: A History of a New Religion, Armstrong is quoted as saying:

Scientology calls itself a "religion" to obtain the benefits, privileges, protections and the benevolent public image that are conferred on religions. Being a religion, the cult claims, makes its aggressive, abusive, dishonest and criminal activities, its war of total attrition of its "enemies", legally protected "religious expression" or "religious freedom". Scientology is not benevolent, but malevolent. Its ostensibly benevolent activities — its Volunteer Ministers that show up to "help" at disaster sites; its Narconon anti-drug operations; its Way to Happiness booklet campaign, etc. — are to cloak the cult's malevolence.

Despite the toll taken on him, Armstrong feels the fight has been worth it: "I know the fraud, I know the sociopathy. I can write and talk. And so far, they have not been able to silence me."

== See also ==
- Armstrong cases
- Pseudobiography of L. Ron Hubbard
- Scientology controversies § "Attack the Attacker" policy
