= Dorothy Dixer =

Australian political term

In Australian politics, a Dorothy Dixer is a rehearsed or planted question asked of a government Minister by a backbencher of their own political party during Parliamentary Question Time.

The term can be used in a mildly derogatory sense, but in common usage today is simply pre-arranged questions from a friendly audience member. Often, the question has been written by the Minister or their staff rather than by the questioner, and is used to give the Minister a chance to promote themselves or the work of the Government, or to criticise the opposition party's policies, to raise the profile of the backbench Member asking the question, or to consume the time available for questioning and thereby avoid tougher questions. It is a common and widely accepted tactic during Question Time in the House of Representatives and the Senate.

While it is rare, it would be possible for a backbencher on the Government side of the house to ask a member of the Government a question without it being regarded as a Dorothy Dixer. Such a question would be one that the Minister had not planted and was not aware of in advance.

It is common for "Dorothy Dixers" to end in the question: "Is the Minister aware of any alternative policies?" This enables the responding Minister to launch into extended criticism of the Opposition and their policy on the question's subject matter, which may include a pre-planned speech intended as a character assassination of an opposition member, while still remaining technically relevant to the question as asked as Standing orders require. These questions or the answers to them are often based upon, refer to, or build upon, party line propaganda written earlier in the day by ideologically friendly members of the news media.

== History ==
The term references American advice columnist Dorothy Dix's reputed practice of making up her own questions to allow her to publish more interesting answers. "Dorothy Dixer" has been used in Australian politics since the 1950s, and has become increasingly common in everyday usage, although the term is now frequently shortened to "Dixer". However, the term is virtually unknown in other countries where Dix's column was equally popular.

In 2015, the Parliament of Victoria abolished Dorothy Dixers, replacing them instead with ministers' statements, where ministers are granted up to two minutes during question time to advise parliament on new government initiatives, projects and achievements.

== Usage ==
In his book An Introduction to Australian Politics, Dean Jaensch observes:

A growing number of questions are of the 'Dorothy-Dix' type (from the government backbench) and attempts to win political points (from both sides of the house).

Similarly, Don Aitkin and Brian Jinks observe in their book Australian Political Institutions:

It is common practice for a minister to have a government backbencher ask a pre-arranged question which can be answered in such a way as to praise the government or exploit a weakness in the Opposition. Such 'Dorothy Dix' questions (after the syndicated 'advice' column which once appeared in popular magazines), are in effect occasions for ministers' speeches, rather than for parliamentary criticism of the executive.

The term is also used (as a "Dorothy Dix" or just a "Dorothy") as rhyming slang in cricket for a six.
