= Ione Quinby Griggs =

American crime journalist

Ione Marie Quinby Griggs (1891-1991) was a crime journalist for the Chicago Evening Post and subsequently wrote an iconic advice column for the Milwaukee Journal Green Sheet for over fifty years.

Born in Kansas to William Paine Quinby and Laura E Quinby (née Peck), Griggs and her family moved frequently during her childhood. Her parents met when her father started a law practice in Salina, Kansas. He moved to Salina in 1885 and by 1889 they were wed. Her eldest sibling was born in 1889. Born on April 22, 1891, Ione Qunby was the eldest daughter in a family that eventually included six children. In 1893, her family moved to Western Springs, Illinois, a suburb of Chicago that had been a home-base for her father's family for several decades. Her father opened a law office in the city. Subsequent moves took the family to her father's family plantation in Tennessee, back to her Kansas birthplace, and then to Western Springs once more, when she was around sixteen years old. Her education was spotty, and Griggs made a variety of claims throughout her life about how far she had gotten through school. Moving back to Chicago, however, provided Griggs with a view of other women writing for newspapers, such as Frances Willard and Margaret Sullivan, and she eventually attended the Northwestern University School of Journalism.

Writing was Griggs's passion from a young age. She published for the first time at age 10, with encouragement from her parents. Her family tree held a number of members who were involved in newspaper work, including a female relative who published a women's rights paper in Ohio's North-West Territory and a variety of others scattered across the country.

== Career ==
In the early 1920s, Griggs began writing for the Chicago Evening Post. There, she became a public voice for women. In her early career, Griggs covered the crime beat, specializing in cases where women were tried for murders of husbands, boyfriends, and lovers. Over time she branched out, many times covering topics generally reserved for male reporters. She also competed with other female journalists, such as Maurine Dallas Watkins for exclusive scoops on sensational crime stories.

Griggs interviewed Al Capone while he was in jail for tax evasion, shared a candy bar with him, and even covered his sister's wedding. While she has often been classified as a "sob sister," and embraced dramatic opportunities to write beyond sensationalized murders—such as when she rode an elephant in a parade and subsequently wrote about it—she also covered politics extensively. In addition, although fewer than five percent of local coverage in the Chicago Evening Post had bylines, Griggs had over one thousand bylined stories in her time at the paper; for a span of some years she bylined in a third of the daily papers. During the Great Depression, Griggs wrote about unemployment and homelessness among Chicago's women. Griggs' biographers concur with history scholar Alice Fahs that, along with other female reporters at the time, Griggs "placed women at the heart of a new public life."

Over time, in addition to her writing for the Chicago Evening Post, Griggs was also writing for crime magazines and syndicated news services as a freelancer. Then, in 1931, she published a book about female killers, Murder for Love.

By 1932, the Chicago Evening Post was struggling due to the economic pressures of the depression, and was forced to lay off many of its writers; due to her high profile Griggs was not among them. In October, 1932, the Chicago Evening Post was absorbed by the Chicago Daily News, ending Griggs' Chicago run. She married Bruce E. Griggs, formerly a journalist for the Milwaukee Journal who had built a career as a freelance writer. They continued her family's penchant for moving around, taking freelance work in various locations around the country. Only a year after they were wed, her husband died in an automobile accident in December, 1933. By January 1934, Griggs moved to Wisconsin to take a job at the Milwaukee Journal, where she was paid "space rates," or only for the portion of her writing that the newspaper ultimately printed. She took a room at the Hotel Wisconsin, where she continued to live for decades, within walking distance of the newspaper.

Although she started out writing various news stories for the paper, in November 1934 Griggs published her first "Dear Mrs. Griggs" advice column, which she would continue to write for over half a century and which would become the mainstay of the Milwaukee Journal. Originally imagined as help for the lovelorn, in the more than 15,000 "Dear Mrs. Griggs" columns—all signed by "IQG"—she covered a wide range of topics from parenting to why high school classmates who were "wild girls" gained popularity to disability, and gender roles.

Griggs retired in 1985. That same year she was inducted to the Milwaukee Press Club's Hall of Fame. Specifically, she was awarded the Semi-Sacred Cat Award. The University of Wisconsin--Milwaukee's Department of Journalism now offers the Ione Quinby Griggs Journalism Scholarship.

Ione Qinby Griggs died in 1991 at the age of 100.
