= R2-45 =

Scientology slang for murder or suicide by gun

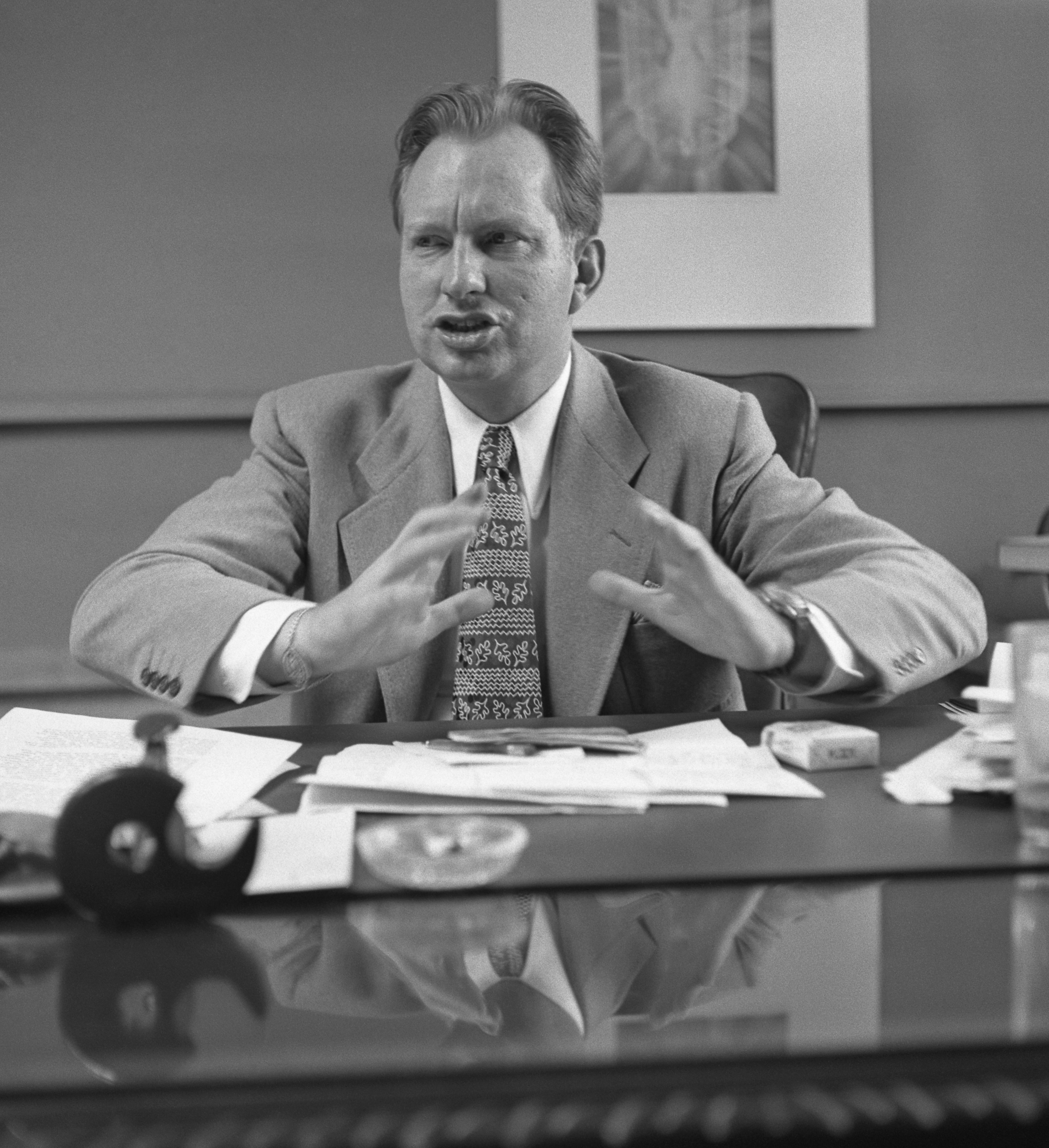
Scientology's founder L. Ron Hubbard in 1950

R2-45 is Scientology slang for murder or suicide by gun. Scientology founder L. Ron Hubbard described it as "an enormously effective process for exteriorization but its use is frowned upon by this society at this time". In Scientology doctrine, exteriorization refers to the separation of the thetan (soul) from the body, a phenomenon which Hubbard asserts can be achieved through Scientology auditing. R2-45 is said to be a process by which exteriorization could be produced by shooting a person in the head with a .45 caliber pistol. This literal meaning is acknowledged by the Church of Scientology, although they deny that it is meant seriously.

== Origins of R2-45 ==
In the book The Creation of Human Ability, Hubbard describes two training "Routes", with the exercises in Route 1 numbered R1-4 to R1-15, and the exercises in Route 2 numbered R2-16 to R2-75. R2-45 is simply described as "an enormously effective process for exteriorization but its use is frowned upon by this society at this time".

Several conflicting accounts exist of where and when R2-45 originated and how it was presented by Hubbard. According to Stewart Lamont, in one of a series of lectures called the Philadelphia Doctorate Course, held from December 1 to 19, 1952, Hubbard demonstrated R2-45 by firing a Colt 45 into the floor of the podium. George Malko gives a slightly different account in his 1970 book Scientology: The Now Religion, writing that "Hubbard is said to have marched out onto center stage at one of the Scientology congresses in Washington, D.C., in the late fifties, pulled out a .45 loaded with blanks, fired it into the audience, and announced to the stunned assemblage, 'I just thought you'd like to see what R2-45 looks like!'" A 2007 promotional film produced by the Church of Scientology features a claimed eyewitness account of Hubbard's introduction of R2-45. According to an unnamed veteran Scientologist who appeared in the film, R2-45 first appeared in a 1954 lecture given by Hubbard in Phoenix, Arizona, in which he described a series of auditing processes in numerical order:

When he got through talking about R2-44, he came out wearing a full Western garb like you might see in a John Wayne movie and a six-shooter strapped to his side... Then he said something to the effect of, 'And now we have R2-45', and he pulled out this gun and blam! It was loaded with blanks, of course, but it woke everybody up. He said something to the effect of, 'It's a very effective process for exteriorization, but frowned upon at this time by the society.' And that was all, he didn't say another word about it. But it brought down the house.

Decades later, Hubbard's estranged son Ronald DeWolf said that he had been present at a meeting where his father fired a pistol into the floor to illustrate R2-45. DeWolf commented, "I thought he was kidding and that it was a blank, but it wasn't; there was a hole in the floor. It was for real; he meant it."

== R2-45 in Hubbard's lectures ==
Hubbard mentioned R2-45 in several more lectures given to Scientologists in the 1950s and 1960s. In the 1956 lecture "Exteriorization", Hubbard referred in passing to R2-45; a footnote in the transcript refers to the process as being "used humorously". In a lecture of 1958, Hubbard commented that "Death is not the same as clearing but there is, remember, R2-45. It's a very valid technique. A lot of people have used it before now." He said in a 1959 lecture that "even cops or gangsters" could make a "Clear" out of a person "by taking a Webley 38 or Smith & Wesson, or Colt or something like that and doing R2-45." An extract from this lecture was published on the Internet in 2009 by WikiLeaks. In a 1961 lecture, he said: "If that fails you, well, you've always got suicide. You could propose that to the pc (preclear). That would solve his problems. 'R2-45' by its various – various other techniques." He called it a "big process" that would "take a pc's head off" in another lecture a few months later, to which the transcript records that the audience responded with laughter.

== R2-45 in practice ==
Some critics of Scientology and ex-Scientologists have alleged that R2-45 was invoked by Hubbard to authorize the killing of individuals regarded as antagonistic to the Church of Scientology. There is no evidence that it has ever been put into practice and Hubbard did not explicitly define the meaning of R2-45 in writing. Representatives of the Church of Scientology have said that Hubbard's description of R2-45 "was coined as a joke — [it] is not authorized, and I am afraid [it] occasionally 'misfires' as a joke when taken literally".

On two separate occasions orders to use R2-45 on specific individuals were published in a prominent Scientology magazine. On March 6, 1968, Hubbard issued an internal memo titled "Racket Exposed", in which he denounced twelve people as "Enemies of mankind, the planet and all life", and ordered that "Any Sea Org member contacting any of them is to use Auditing Process R2-45." The memo was subsequently reproduced, with another name added, in the Church of Scientology's internal journal, The Auditor. Another four people were named in a second R2-45 order published in The Auditor later in 1968. Stephen A. Kent of the University of Alberta characterises such orders as demonstrations of "the manifestation of Hubbard's malignant narcissism and, more specifically, his narcissistic rage." The Santa Rosa News-Herald reported in 1982 that "attorneys have uncovered evidence to suggest that between 1975 and 1977, during the FBI's investigation of the cult, meetings of Scientology executives were held in which there were discussions relative to 'auditing' high-level FBI members with auditing process R2-45."

== See also ==
- Fair game (Scientology)
- Suppressive person
- Scientology controversies
