= Fair game (Scientology) =

Actions of the Church of Scientology towards perceived enemies

Fair Game
- Type: Practice in Scientology
- Description: The targeting of enemies of Scientology with actions to silence or neutralize them
- Role: To protect the Church of Scientology from perceived threats
- Key texts: Scientology ethics orders and policy letters
- Associated controversies: Allegations of harassment, surveillance, retaliatory actions

The term fair game is used to describe policies and practices carried out by the Church of Scientology towards people and groups it perceives as its enemies. Founder of Scientology L. Ron Hubbard established the policy in the 1950s in response to criticism both from within and outside his organization. Individuals or groups who are "fair game" are judged to be a threat to the Church (Note: Use of "Church" or "the Church" is a common shortened form of "Church of Scientology"; see The Church (Scientology).) and, according to the policy, can be punished and harassed using any and all means possible. In 1968, Hubbard officially canceled use of the term "fair game" because of negative public relations it caused, although the Church's aggressive response to criticism continued.

Applying the principles of "fair game", Hubbard and his followers targeted many individuals as well as government officials and agencies, including a program of covert and illegal infiltration of the Internal Revenue Service (IRS) and other United States government agencies during the 1970s. They also conducted private investigations, character assassination and legal action against the Church's critics in the media. The policy remains in effect and has been defended by the Church of Scientology as a core religious practice.

Starting in the 1980s, for their major branch in Los Angeles, California, the Scientology organization largely switched from using church members in harassment campaigns to hiring private investigators, including former and current Los Angeles police officers. The reason seemed to be that this gave the Church of Scientology a layer of protection in case embarrassing tactics were used and made public.

== Background ==
Scientology's founder, L. Ron Hubbard, said all opposition came from what he called "suppressive persons" (SPs) – which Scientologists claim are "anti-social people who want to destroy anything that benefits humanity." In written policies dating from the mid-1950s, Hubbard told his followers to take a hard line against perceived opponents. In 1955 he wrote, "The purpose of the suit is to harass and discourage rather than to win. The law can be used easily to harass, and enough harassment on somebody who is simply on the thin edge anyway, well knowing that he is not authorized, will generally be sufficient to cause his professional decease. If possible, of course, ruin him utterly".

In his confidential Manual of Justice of 1959, Hubbard wrote "People attack Scientology. I never forget it, always even the score." He advocated using private investigators to investigate critics, who had turned out to be "members of the Communist Party or criminals, usually both. The smell of police or private detectives caused them to fly, to close down, to confess. Hire them and damn the cost when you need to." He said that in dealing with opponents, his followers should "always find or manufacture enough threat against them to cause them to sue for peace. Don't ever defend. Always attack." He urged the use of "black propaganda" to "destroy reputation or public belief in persons, companies or nations."

The Church of Scientology has retained an aggressive policy towards those it perceives as its enemies, and argued as late as 1985 that retributive action against "enemies of Scientology" should be considered a Constitutionally-protected "core practice" of Scientology.

== Policy ==
In 1965, Hubbard formulated the "Fair Game Law", which states how to deal with people who interfere with Scientology's activities. These suppressive persons could be considered "fair game" for retaliation:

By FAIR GAME is meant, may not be further protected by the codes and disciplines or the rights of a Scientologist.

— L. Ron Hubbard, HCOPL 1 Mar 65 Suppressive Acts – Suppression of Scientology and Scientologists – The Fair Game Law

In other words, a person who attacked the Church would not be protected by the Church or granted the rights of Scientologists in good standing.

In December of that year, Hubbard reissued the policy with additional clarifications to define the scope of fair game. He made it clear that the policy applied to non-Scientologists as well, declaring:

The homes, property, places and abodes of persons who have been active in attempting to: suppress Scientology or Scientologists are all beyond any protection of Scientology Ethics, unless absolved by later Ethics or an amnesty [...] [T]his Policy Letter extends to suppressive non-Scientology wives and husbands and parents, or other family members or hostile groups or even close friends.

— L. Ron Hubbard, HCOPL 23 Dec 65, Suppressive Acts – Suppression of Scientology and Scientologists – The Fair Game Law

In his Introduction to Scientology Ethics, published in 1968, Hubbard wrote that no Scientologist could be punished "for any action taken against a suppressive person or Group during the period that person or group is 'fair game'."

He made it clear elsewhere in his writings that the policy would be applied to external organizations, including governments, that interfered with Scientology's activities. He told Scientologists:

If the Internal Revenue Service (in refusing the FCDC non-profit status) continues to act up or if the FDA does sue we can of course Comm Ev them and if found guilty, label and publish them as a Suppressive Group and fair game [...] [N]one is fair game until he or she declares against us.

— L. Ron Hubbard, HCOPL 2 Apr 65, Administration outside Scientology

In a 1967 policy titled Penalties for Lower Conditions, Hubbard wrote that opponents who are "fair game" may be "deprived of property or injured by any means by any Scientologist without any discipline of the Scientologist. May be tricked, sued or lied to or destroyed."

In a policy letter dated July 21, 1968, Hubbard explicitly cancelled these penalties. The new list of Penalties for Lower Conditions now said that someone in a condition of Enemy "(m)ay be restrained or imprisoned. May not be protected by any rules or laws of the group he sought to injure. [...] May not be trained or processed or admitted to any [Scientology organisation]. The same list says that in a condition of Treason, a person, "May not be protected by the rights and fair practices he sought to destroy for others. May be retrained or debarred. [...] Not covered by amnesties." Another policy letter from October that year announces:

The practice of declaring people FAIR GAME will cease. FAIR GAME may not appear on any Ethics Order. It causes bad public relations. This [policy letter] does not cancel any policy on the treatment or handling of an SP.

— L. Ron Hubbard, HCOPL 21 Oct 68, Cancellation of Fair Game

Scientology officials have maintained that the fair game policy was rescinded in 1968 because people had misinterpreted it. Spokesmen said that Hubbard's intended meaning was merely that former members could not appeal to Scientology's legal system for support or protection against anyone who might try to trick, sue or destroy them. Sociologist Roy Wallis commented that this interpretation seemed to be "contradicted by the words on the page, and by actions taken against those regarded as enemies of the movement."

The Church continued to pursue an aggressive response to external critics, especially the U.S. Government. The doctrine of "fair game" was a central element of the Guardian's Office's operational policies. The original 1965 "Fair Game Law" is listed as a reference for GO staff in its confidential Intelligence Course, which was later entered into evidence in a U.S. federal court case in 1979. During the case, Church lawyers admitted that "fair game" had been practiced long after its supposed cancellation in 1968.

Hubbard said in a 1976 affidavit that he had never intended to authorize harassment:

There was never any attempt or intent on my part by the writing of these policies (or any others for that fact), to authorise illegal or harassment type acts against anyone. As soon as it became apparent to me that the concept of 'fair game' as described above was being misinterpreted by the uninformed, to mean the granting of a license to Scientologists for acts in violation of the law and/or other standards of decency, these policies were cancelled.

— L. Ron Hubbard, Affidavit of March 22, 1976

As revised in 1991, Scientology's policy on the handling of "suppressive persons" states:

Nothing in this policy letter shall ever or under any circumstances justify any violation of the laws of the land or intentional legal wrongs. Any such offense shall subject the offender to penalties prescribed by law as well as to ethics and justice actions.

— L. Ron Hubbard, HCOPL 23 Dec 65RB, rev. 9 Jan 91, Suppressive Acts Suppression of Scientology and Scientologists

== In practice ==
An "Ethics Order" dating from March 6, 1968, issued by L. Ron Hubbard aboard his boat the Royal Scotsman, lists twelve Scientologists who were accused of distributing altered versions of upper level materials. Hubbard writes "They are fair game. No amnesty may ever cover them. [...] Any Sea Org member contacting them is to use Auditing Process R2-45." The R2-45 Auditing Process consists of shooting a person with the intent to kill them.

It later emerged that "fair game" had actually continued in use until at least 1980, despite its cancellation, and there have been frequent allegations that it has remained in force since then. During the 1970s the Guardian's Office (GO) of the Church of Scientology, headed by Hubbard's wife Mary Sue, conducted a wide-ranging and systematic series of espionage and intimidation operations against perceived enemies of Scientology. (See Operation Freakout for a noteworthy example.)

According to an American Lawyer investigation, "fair game" tactics had been used to force the withdrawal of the presiding judge in an attempt to "throw" the case. As the US Government's attorneys put it:

Defendants, through one of their attorneys, have stated that the fair game policy continued in effect well after the indictment in this case and the conviction of the first nine co-defendants. Defendants claim that the policy was abrogated by the Church's Board of Directors in late July or early August, 1980, only after the defendants' personal attack on Judge Richey.

— 1979 sentencing memorandum, Mary Sue Hubbard et al.

The abrogation mentioned above was issued in a policy letter of July 22, 1980, "Ethics, Cancellation of Fair Game, more about", issued by "The Board of Directors of the Churches of Scientology". However, this cancellation was itself cancelled in a subsequent HCO Policy Letter of September 8, 1983, "Cancellation of Issues on Suppressive Acts and PTSes", which cancelled a number of HCOPLs on the ground that they "were not written by the Founder [Hubbard]". In two subsequent court cases the Church defended "fair game" as a "core practice of Scientology", and claimed that it was therefore protected as "religious expression".

Since then, a number of ex-Scientologists who formerly held senior management positions in the Church have alleged that while working for the Church they saw "fair game" tactics continuing to be used. In 1994, Vicki Aznaran, who had been the chairman of the Board of the Religious Technology Center (the Church's central management body), claimed in an affidavit that:

Because of my position and the reports which regularly crossed my desk, I know that during my entire presidency of RTC "fair game" actions against enemies were daily routine. Apart from the legal tactics described below, the "fair game" activities included break-ins, libel, upsetting the companies of the enemy, espionage, harassment, misuse of confidential communications in the folders of community members and so forth.

— Vicki Aznaran, Affidavit

Janie Peterson, a former Scientologist, testified in a Clearwater City hearing in 1982 that while working in the Guardians Office she had conducted smear campaigns against Church opponents, sometimes using information from confidential confessional files. A lawyer for the Church denounced the hearings as a "witch hunt". The former Scientologist stated that the fair game policy still applied despite the cancellation of the name.

=== In the United Kingdom ===
In the UK, targets of fair game and related harassment over the years have included ex-members, authors, journalists, broadcasters, the mental health profession, cult-monitoring groups, government and law enforcement.

Maurice William Johnson was a Scientologist who resigned in June 1966 and successfully sued for his money back. He told a court that after leaving he had received over 100 abusive letters, many of them using violent language. An article in The Auditor, a Scientology publication, was produced to the court, stating outright that Johnson was "fair game" and describing him as "an enemy of mankind, the planets and all life".

Jon Atack, an ex-Scientologist who left in 1983, wrote the book A Piece of Blue Sky: Scientology, Dianetics and L. Ron Hubbard Exposed, and the pamphlet "The Total Freedom Trap" as well as providing research for Bare-Faced Messiah. He provided help to other members in leaving the organisation, as well as acting as an expert witness in various cases concerning Scientology. In response, Atack's home was repeatedly picketed by placard-carrying Scientologists over the course of six days. Eugene Ingram, a private investigator employed by the Church of Scientology, made visits to Atack, his elderly mother and other family and friends, spreading rumours that Atack would be going to prison. Scientologists also distributed leaflets entitled "The Truth about Jon Atack", implying that he was a drug dealer who only criticised Scientology for money.

Atack eventually went bankrupt due to the cost of defending himself against legal action from the Church. According to Baroness Sharples speaking in the House of Lords, a number of ex-Scientologists "have been both threatened and harassed and a considerable number of them have been made bankrupt by the Church."

Journalist Paul Bracchi investigated Scientology in the mid-1990s while working at the Evening Argus in East Grinstead. He recounted the case of a Scientologist who had been accused of stealing documents from Saint Hill Manor, and was told in writing that he was a suppressive person and fair game. The man's wife told Bracchi, "For months after, we had anonymous notes delivered in the post almost daily. They said, 'You bastard,' 'You're dead,' 'Nothing will save you.' It was terribly frightening."

Sandy Smith, the editor of the 2007 BBC television programme Panorama, alleged that his team had been subjected to fair game tactics from the Church while filming the documentary Scientology and Me. When the team were filming in the United States, Scientology representatives followed them and repeatedly harangued them. Unknown men also trailed the team, one even appearing at journalist John Sweeney's wedding. Sweeney later complained of being "chased round the streets of Los Angeles by sinister strangers [...] In LA, the moment our hire car left the airport we realised we were being followed by two cars. In our hotel a weird stranger spent every breakfast listening to us." When the crew returned to London, Church of Scientology executive Mike Rinder was sent from the United States to lobby the BBC, even camping out at their offices.

== Cases ==
A series of court cases in England in the 1970s saw "fair game" being strongly criticized by senior judges. The Court of Appeal of England and Wales suggested in one case that Scientology organisations were willing to harass their critics. They also described multiple cases brought against author Russell Miller as a deliberate form of harassment. In a case where the Church of Scientology of California sought to block publication of a book quoting Scientology materials, Lord Justice Goff cited the fair game policy along with what he described as the Church's "deplorable means adopted to suppress inquiry or criticism." He concluded that publication of the materials was in the public interest.

=== Charles Berner, 1965 ===
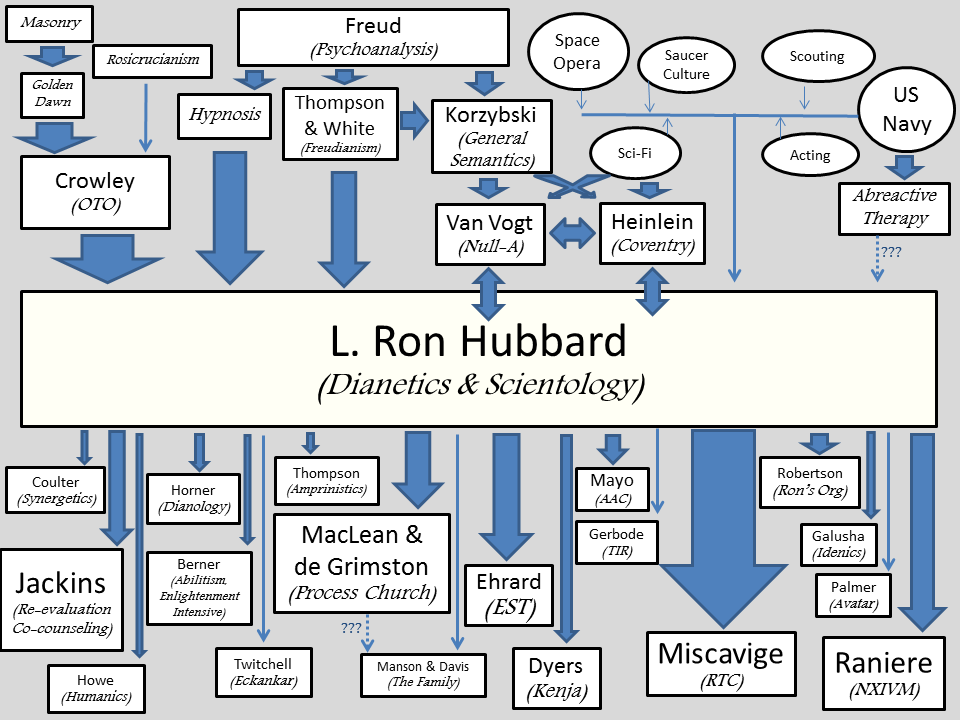
Hubbard's beliefs and practices, drawn from a diverse set of sources, influenced numerous offshoots, splinter groups, and new movements.

According to an FDA investigation, in 1965, ex-Scientologist Charles Berner received a "fair game order". Afterwards, Berner stated he received other life-threatening letters, "indicating he should apply technique R2-45 to himself. This particular technique is a route whereby an individual places a 45 caliber pistol to his head and disassociates [sic] himself from his body."

=== L. Gene Allard, 1974 ===
In 1974, the Church lost a case against an ex-Scientologist named L. Gene Allard who in 1969, shortly after leaving the Church of Scientology, had been arrested on a charge of grand theft made by the Church of Scientology. The charge was dismissed "in the interest of justice", and Allard sued the Church for malicious prosecution. At the trial, Allard's lawyer introduced the October 1967 and October 1968 "fair game" policy statements into evidence. Allard was awarded US$50,000 in compensatory damages and $250,000 in punitive damages. Attorneys acting for the Church of Scientology had argued that the fair game policy had been canceled, was irrelevant to the suit and had not been applied to Allard. An appellate court, while reducing the amount of punitive charges from $250,000 to $50,000, upheld the verdict against the Church, arguing that the Church had been given ample opportunity "to produce evidence that the fair-game policy had been repealed" but had "failed to do so". In July 1976, the California Supreme Court refused to review the case.

=== Paulette Cooper, 1976 ===
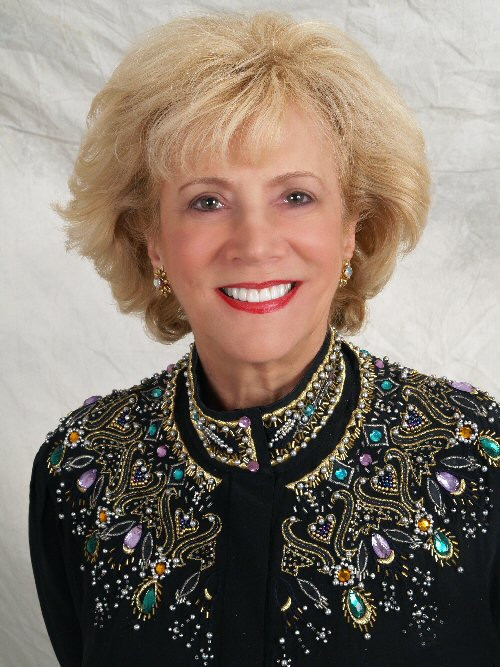
Journalist Paulette Cooper

In Operation Freakout, the Church of Scientology attempted to cause journalist and writer Paulette Cooper to be imprisoned, killed, driven to suicide or committed to a mental institution, as revenge for her publication in 1971 of a highly critical book, The Scandal of Scientology. The Federal Bureau of Investigation (FBI) discovered documentary evidence of the plot and the preceding campaign of harassment during an investigation into the Church of Scientology in 1977, eventually leading to the Church compensating Cooper in an out-of-court settlement.

=== Department of Health and Social Security (UK), 1979 ===
The Church of Scientology of California sued the Department of Health and Social Security (DHSS) in British courts for defamation. The DHSS had suggested that Scientologists were dangerous charlatans who would worsen rather than cure mental illness. The Church demanded as part of discovery that the DHSS release letters and medical records from people who had complained about the Church. Lord Justice Stephenson declined the request, citing the fair game policy, which he believed still applied despite its name being cancelled. He was concerned that the documents would be used "not for legitimate purposes of the action but for harassment of individual patients, informants and renegades named in them, not only by proceedings for defamation against them but by threats and blackmail."

=== Lawrence Wollersheim, 1980 ===
Lawrence Wollersheim

Lawrence Wollersheim, a former Scientologist, successfully argued that he had been harassed and his photography business nearly destroyed as a result of fair game measures. These included getting Scientologist employees to resign, and Scientologist customers to boycott or refuse to pay him. The 1986 judgment by a Los Angeles jury was upheld by the California Court of Appeal in 1989. During appeals, the Church again claimed fair game was a "core practice" of Scientology and was thus constitutionally protected "religious expression". The court decided that the Church's campaign "to ruin Wollersheim economically, and possibly psychologically" should be discouraged rather than protected. Twenty years after the start of the case, the Church paid Wollersheim a judgment, with interest, that amounted to $8,674,643.

=== Jakob Anderson, 1981 ===
In the March 11–16, 1981, Danish court case of Jakob Anderson v. The Church of Scientology of Denmark, ex-Guardian's Office operative Vibeke Damman testified that the Church did in fact practice fair game and had done so in Anderson's case, in an attempt to get Anderson committed to a psychiatric hospital.

=== Gerald Armstrong, 1984 ===
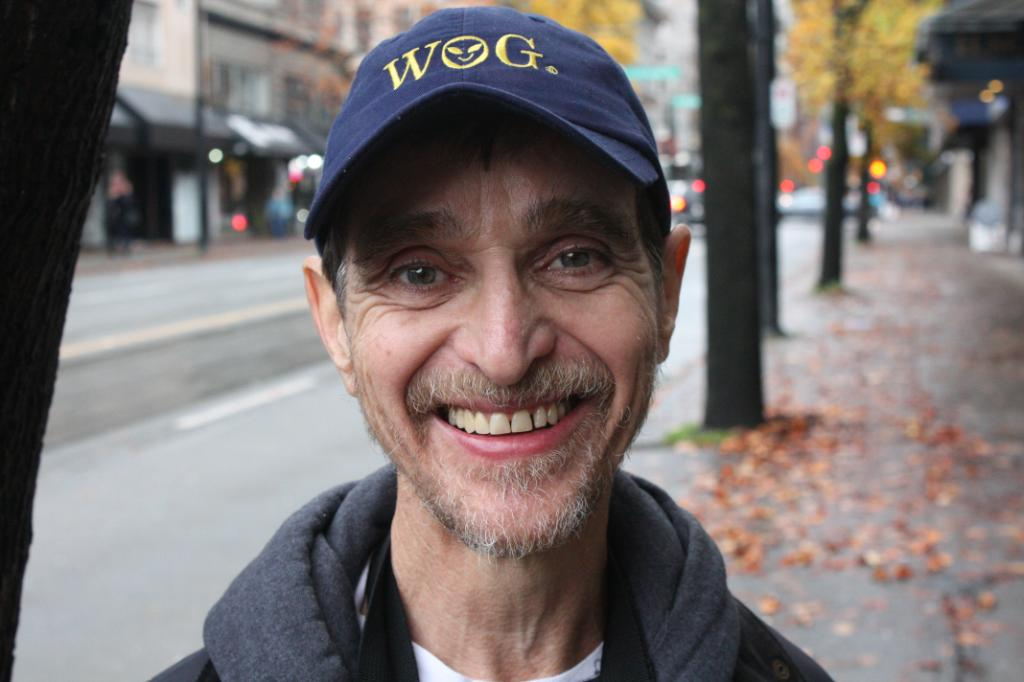
Gerry Armstrong, Hubbard's archivist

In 1980, Scientologist and Sea Org officer Gerry Armstrong was assigned to organize some of Hubbard's personal papers as the basis for a biography of Hubbard. Omar Garrison, a non-Scientologist known to be sympathetic to Scientology, was hired to write the biography. Both Armstrong and Garrison quickly realized that the papers reflected unfavorably on Hubbard, and revealed that many of Hubbard's claimed accomplishments were exaggerations or outright fabrications. Garrison abandoned the project, and a disillusioned Armstrong and his wife left the Church, retaining copies of the embarrassing materials as insurance against the expected harassment to come.

Armstrong was sued by the Church in 1982 for the theft of private documents. The "fair game" policy became an issue in court. Armstrong won the case, in part because the Judge ruled that Armstrong, as a Scientologist of long standing, knew that fair game was practiced, and had good reason to believe that possession of these papers would be necessary to defend himself against illegal persecution by the Church. In a scathing decision, Judge Paul Breckenridge wrote:

In addition to violating and abusing its own members' civil-rights, the organization over the years with its "fair game" doctrine has harassed and abused those persons not in the Church whom it perceives as enemies. [...] [Armstrong] was declared an enemy by the Church. He believed, reasonably, that he was subject to "fair game".

— Judge Paul Breckenridge, Los Angeles Superior Court, June 20, 1984

=== Latey judgment, 1984 ===
A child custody case in London's High Court examined the culture of Scientology to investigate the risks to children being raised within it. Stating his conclusions in a public hearing, Mr. Justice Latey read some of Scientology's internal documents into the record. Despite the alleged cancellation of "Fair game", he reported that, "Deprival of property, injury by any means, trickery, suing, lying or destruction have been pursued throughout and to this day with the fullest possible vigour." As an example, he cited the case of a doctor at Harvard Medical School who at one point was regarded as the Church's "Number One Enemy". The Church had persecuted him by stealing his employment records from a hospital, launching frivolous lawsuits against him and tracking down his patients and neighbors. The Citizens' Commission on Human Rights, which Latey described as "a Scientology 'front'", made multiple complaints of misconduct against the doctor.

=== Pat Broeker, 1989 ===
In 2009, the Tampa Bay Times reported that after Pat Broeker left the Church of Scientology in 1989 and moved to Colorado, David Miscavige hired private detectives for $32,000 a month. They followed him for the next two decades to Wyoming and ten years in Czech Republic, where he went to medical school and worked as an English teacher. In 2012, Paul Marrick and Greg Arnold, the two private detectives who followed Broeker for 25 years, sued the Church of Scientology for breach of contract when the organization stopped paying them for their investigations.

=== Pedro Lerma Gámez, 1990 ===
The Dominican cartoonist Pedro Lerma Gámez, known as Petrus, was successfully treated for his drug addiction at a Narconon center in Paris. The Church of Scientology considered that Lerma was not following the instructions of the organization and sent missions to try to redirect him. This included a smear campaign conducted against Lerma by "Judit" and "Greg" and a private detective and former National Police inspector, José Manuel Villarejo Pérez. During their fourth mission, Villarejo introduced a brother-in-law, (with the nickname el Pitrancas and codenamed Hero) to Narconon; the information Hero gathered there made it possible to include the detox center's clients in the smear campaign.

In April 1984 a fifth mission, headed by Rodolfo Sabanero, was aimed at getting Lerma incarcerated. Villarejo brainwashed Juan Carlos Borrallo Rebolledo, a drug addict with a criminal record for robberies who had been treated at Narconon. The plan consisted of Borrallo giving himself up to the authorities (for robbery) and then implicating Lerma in being accessory to a robbery at the Dianetics headquarters. On May 8, 1984, Borrallo appeared at a Madrid police station, admitting to two robberies that he had actually committed (to give credibility to the matter) and of a theft of several E-Meters at the Dianetics headquarters, saying that he was induced to steal them by Pedro Lerma. Another individual, named José Luis Díaz López, conveniently presented himself to police with the same deposition. Villarejo – still having friendly contacts within the police – influenced the development of the police investigation, resulting in Lerma being arraigned and entered in prison with bail being set at 800,000 pesetas. During proceedings, however, the presiding judge, José María Vázquez Honrubia, discovered the smear plot and Lerma was acquitted by the Sixteenth Section of the Madrid Court in 1990.

=== Richard Behar, 1991 ===
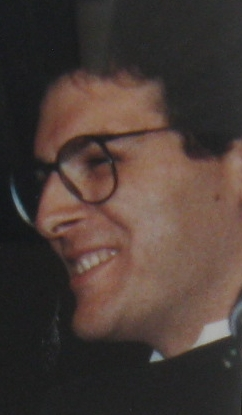
Journalist Richard Behar

In 1991, investigative journalist Richard Behar wrote "The Thriving Cult of Greed and Power", a Time cover story on Scientology. The acclaimed article won several awards. The Church of Scientology brought several lawsuits over the article, all of which were eventually dismissed. While investigating the story, he experienced some of Scientology's "fair game" tactics:

I later learned, a copy of my personal credit report – with detailed information about my bank accounts, home mortgage, credit-card payments, home address and Social Security number – had been illegally retrieved from a national credit bureau called Trans Union. The sham company that received it, "Educational Funding Services" of Los Angeles, gave as its address a mail drop a few blocks from Scientology's headquarters. The owner of the mail drop is a private eye named Fred Wolfson, who admits that an Ingram associate retained him to retrieve credit reports on several individuals. Wolfson says he was told that Scientology's attorneys "had judgments against these people and were trying to collect on them." He says now, "These are vicious people. These are vipers." Ingram, through a lawyer, denies any involvement in the scam. [...] After that, however, an attorney subpoenaed me, while another falsely suggested that I might own shares in a company I was reporting about that had been taken over by Scientologists (he also threatened to contact the U.S. Securities and Exchange Commission). A close friend in Los Angeles received a disturbing telephone call from a Scientology staff member seeking data about me – an indication that the cult may have illegally obtained my personal phone records. Two detectives contacted me, posing as a friend and a relative of a so-called cult victim, to elicit negative statements from me about Scientology. Some of my conversations with them were taped, transcribed and presented by the church in affidavits to Time's lawyers as "proof" of my bias against Scientology.

— Richard Behar

=== Carmen Llywelyn, 2002 ===
Actress and photographer Carmen Llywelyn was introduced to Scientology through her partner (and future husband) professional skateboarder and actor Jason Lee. In 2015, Llywelyn penned an article entitled "Why I Left Scientology". According to her account, when she revealed to her talent manager that she had read A Piece of Blue Sky, a book critical of the Church, she was labeled a suppressive person and shunned (or "disconnected") by her Scientologist friends. Llywelyn's manager, a Scientologist, also "disconnected" and allegedly convinced United Talent Agency to drop Llywelyn as a client.

Llwelyn reports being subjected to a campaign of surveillance and harassment. Writes Llywelyn: "Scientology has a sophisticated intelligence agency known as the Office of Special Affairs, which is essentially a complex system dedicated to ruining the lives of those it sees as enemies in any way possible. Those who work for the OSA do not follow the law."

=== John Sweeney, 2007 ===
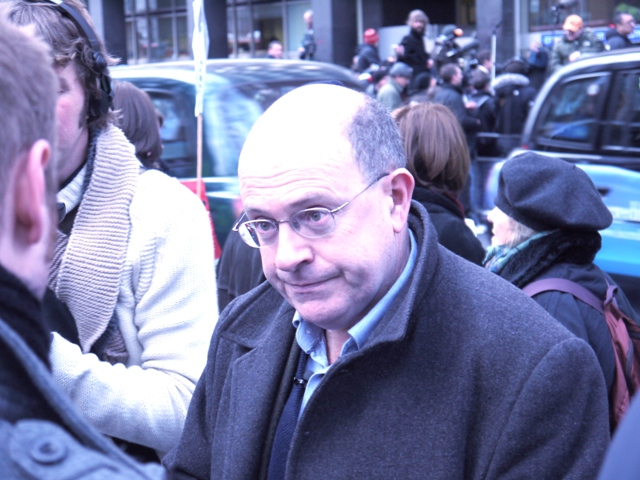
Journalist John Sweeney

Journalist John Sweeney said of fair gaming: "While making our BBC Panorama film Scientology and Me I have been shouted at, spied on, had my hotel invaded at midnight, denounced as a 'bigot' by star Scientologists and been chased round the streets of Los Angeles by sinister strangers." Sweeney also claimed that his family and neighbours had been harassed by unidentified strangers back in the UK, including an intruder at his wedding who fled when confronted.

=== Mark and Monique Rathbun, 2009 ===
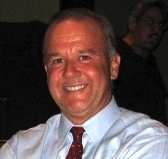
Former senior executive Mark Rathbun

Mark C. "Marty" Rathbun, a former senior executive of the Church of Scientology, left the organization in 2004. A one-hour feature titled Scientologists at War was broadcast on June 17, 2013, on British Channel Four. The feature, a rare insider view of the Church of Scientology, investigated the pressure tactics used by the "Squirrel Busters" affiliated to the organization to discredit and silence members who leave the Church. It highlighted the story of Mark Rathbun, his role in Scientology, his fall out with Scientology leader David Miscavige, his attempts to further the cause of an independent Scientology movement, his confrontations with the "Squirrel Busters" and the repercussions on his family life.

Videographer Bert Leahy reported being paid $2,000 a week by the "Squirrel Busters" to help document their activities. Leahy reported that his employer had "flat-out said our goal is to make Marty's life a living hell".

In 2013, Mark Rathbun's wife, a non-Scientologist, filed suit against the Church of Scientology, alleging four years of harassment by the Church. In October 2014, Rathbun filmed an encounter which he claimed showed three members of the Church's top management as they "ambushed" him at Los Angeles International Airport. The Church defended this activity as being protected by first amendment (religious freedom) and free speech rights. As of January 2016, the court has denied a Church motion to have the case dismissed under anti-SLAPP law, but the ruling that Miscavige must testify in the case was overturned on appeal. After more than 32 months of litigation, Monique Rathbun dropped the lawsuit against the Church, after firing her attorneys in January 2016, due to financial constraints. She filed a motion to end the legal proceedings which the state Supreme court granted on May 6, and Monique Rathbun filed for dismissal on May 10.

=== Ronald Miscavige Sr., 2012 ===
David Miscavige's father, Ronald Miscavige Sr., was a longtime Scientologist who left the Church of Scientology in 2012. In July 2013, Wisconsin police responded to a suspicious person call and found Dwayne S. Powell outside Ronald's home. Powell was in possession of firearms and an illegal homemade silencer. Powell claimed to have received $10,000 a week, for over a year, to conduct full-time surveillance on the elder Miscavige for Scientology. Powell and his son would stalk Ronald and follow him wherever he went. Powell told police that on one occasion, he witnessed what he believed to be Ron Sr. undergoing cardiac arrest. According to Powell, after immediately reporting the perceived emergency to his superiors, he received a call for further instructions from a man who identified himself as David Miscavige. According to the police report, Powell was instructed "to let him die and not intervene in any way."

=== Mike Rinder and Tony Ortega, 2015 ===
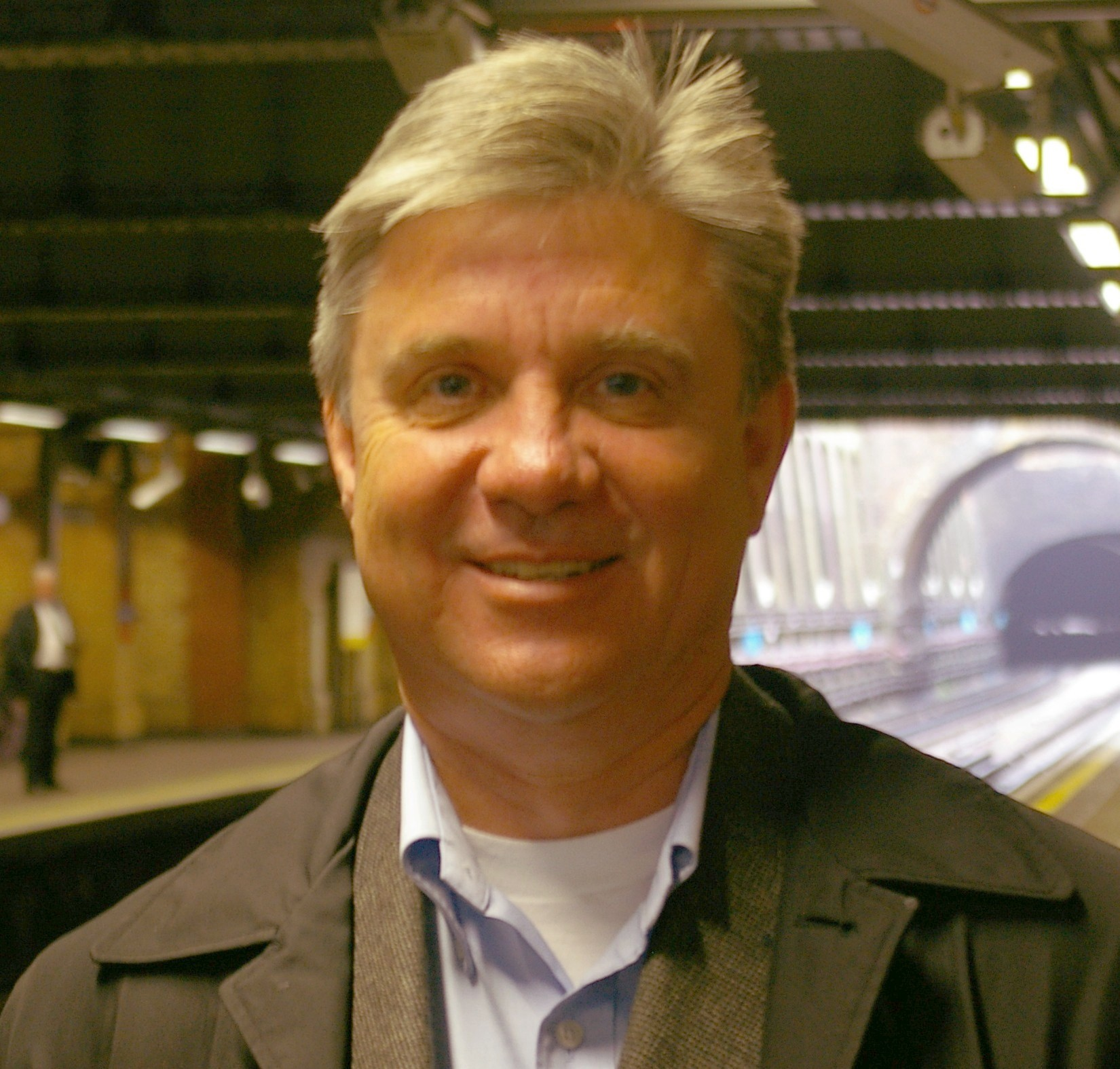
Former church spokesman Mike Rinder

In March 2015, private investigator Eric Saldarriaga pleaded guilty to the federal charge of conspiracy to commit computer hacking after he illegally gained access to at least 60 email accounts. Among those targeted were Mike Rinder, the former spokesman for the Church of Scientology, and journalist Tony Ortega. Both men had participated in the HBO documentary film Going Clear: Scientology and the Prison of Belief.

== See also ==
- Dead agenting
- Mobbing
- Keeping Scientology Working
- Noisy investigation, used by the Church of Scientology to intimidate, harass, and attack their enemies
- Scientology beliefs and practices
- Scientology and law—See the section "L. Ron Hubbard and lawsuits" for more on the "Fair Game Law" as envisioned by Hubbard
- Vexatious litigation
- Group stalking
