= Green Sheet (Milwaukee Journal) =

Four-page section of the Milwaukee Journal

The Green Sheet was a four-page section of the Milwaukee Journal printed on green paper. It was published from the 1910s to 1994, containing comics, the crossword puzzle and other games, celebrity news, local human-interest stories, and bits of ephemera.

Perhaps its most prolific contributor was Ione Quinby Griggs, or "IQG" the advice columnist who wrote over 15,000 "Dear Mrs. Griggs" entries in her fifty-one years on the paper, spanning from November, 1934, until her retirement in 1985.

The last Green Sheet was published in the March 19, 1994, edition of the Journal, Milwaukee's afternoon newspaper, about a year before it merged with the morning Milwaukee Sentinel. Features from the Green Sheet briefly appeared in the Journal's new Life section before being merged into the Sentinel's Good Morning section, and taking that name under the new Milwaukee Journal Sentinel.\

The Journal Sentinel eventually brought the Green Sheet back on May 25, 2015 (Memorial Day), and continues to publish it in the Monday through Saturday newspapers. Unlike the former Green Sheet, the section is printed on plain paper with the Green Sheet features printed with a green background.
