= Dorothy Dix =

American newspaper columnist (1861–1951)

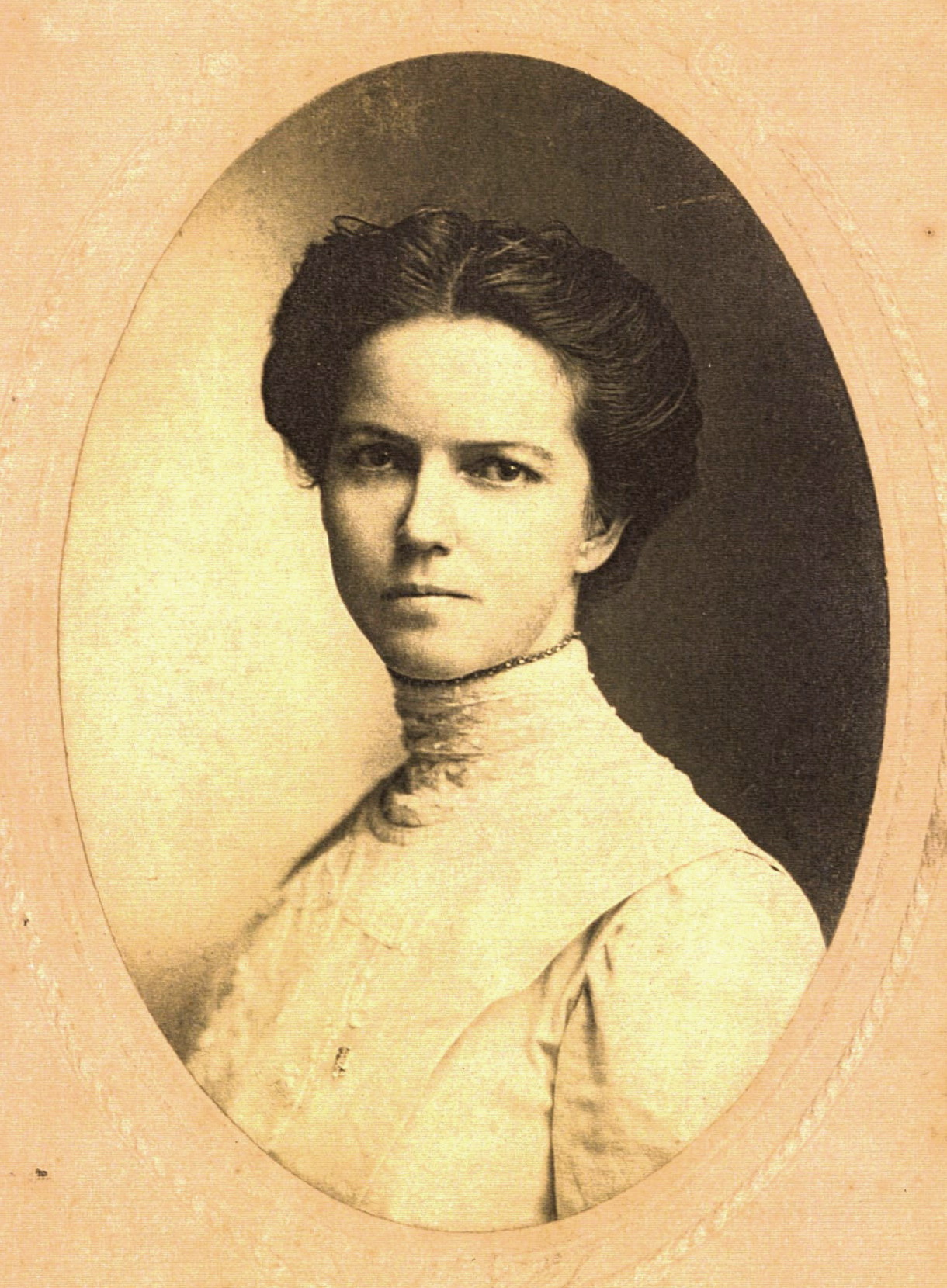
- Dix in c.1892
- Born: Elizabeth Meriwether; November 18, 1861; Woodstock plantation (borders of Montgomery County, Tennessee and Todd County, Kentucky), U.S.
- Died: December 16, 1951 (aged 90)
- Education: Hollins Institute, 1883
- Occupations: Journalist and columnist
- Spouse: George Gilmer (m. 1888; died 1931)
- Writing career
- Pen name: Dorothy Dix
- Subject: Marriage advice
- Notable work: Dorothy Dix Talks

Elizabeth Meriwether Gilmer (November 18, 1861 – December 16, 1951), widely known by the pen name Dorothy Dix, was an American journalist and columnist. As the forerunner of today's popular advice columnists, Dix was America's highest paid and most widely read female journalist at the time of her death. Her advice on marriage was syndicated in newspapers around the world. With an estimated audience of 60 million readers, she became a popular and recognized figure on her travels abroad. In addition to her journalistic work, she joined in the campaign for women's suffrage and the ratification of the Nineteenth Amendment to the U.S. Constitution.

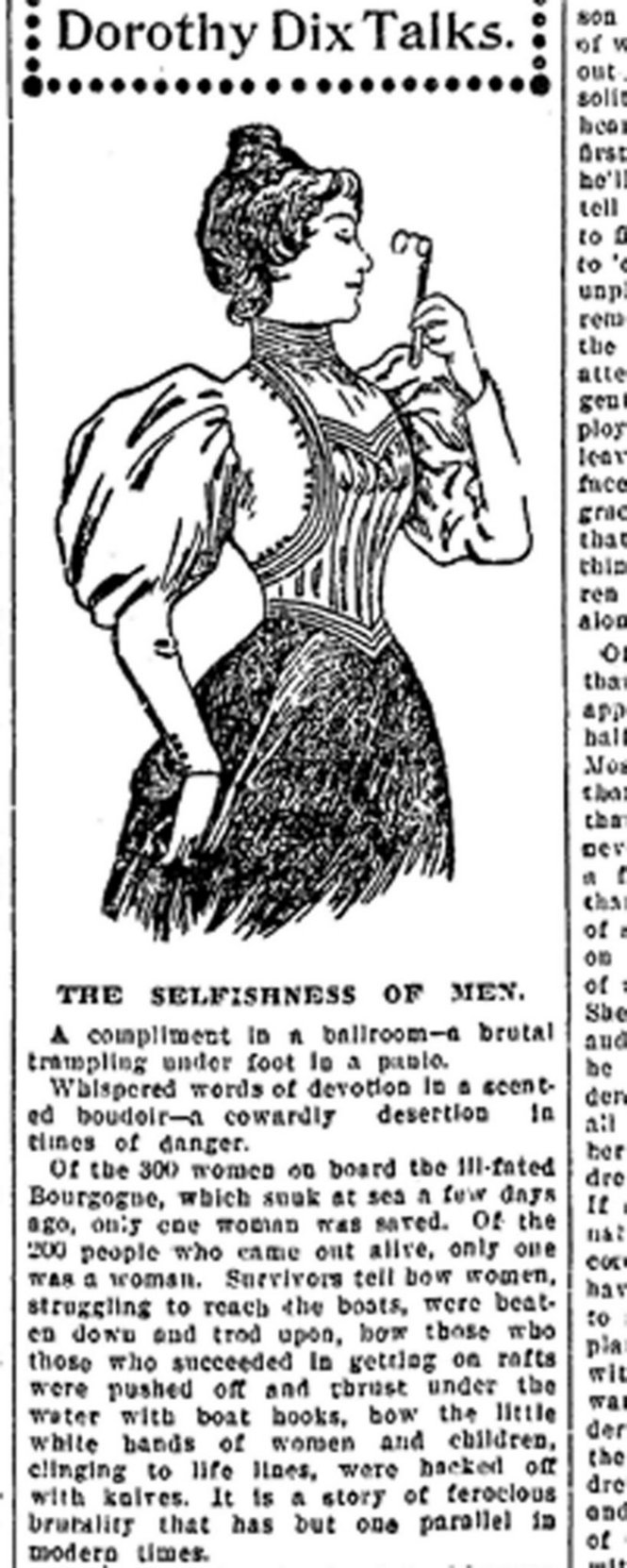
1898 column denouncing the selfishness of the men involved in the Bourgogne Disaster.

== Life ==
Elizabeth Meriwether was born to William Meriwether and Maria (Winston) Meriwether on the Woodstock plantation located on the borders of Montgomery County, Tennessee and Todd County, Kentucky. She attended Clarksville Female Academy and later completed one semester at the Hollins Institute. In 1888, she married her stepmother's brother, George Gilmer.

Shortly after her marriage to George, his mental health began to deteriorate, forcing Dix to provide financial support for both of them. He would later be institutionalized and eventually died in an asylum in 1931. In the aftermath of these events, Dix moved to Louisiana and took up writing. Her journalism career began after her neighbor Eliza Nicholson, the owner of the New Orleans newspaper Daily Picayune, saw her work and offered her a job as a reporter.

== Career ==
At the beginning of her career, before writing advice columns, Dix wrote obituaries, recipes and theater reviews. As was customary for many female journalists at the time, who believed that their work had the potential to cause embarrassment or poor social standing, she chose to write under a pseudonym. She first used the pen name Dorothy Dix in 1895 for her column, "Sunday Salad," in the Picayune; Dorothy, because she liked the name, and Dix in honor of an old family slave named Mr. Dick who had saved the Meriwether family silver during the Civil War. Within months the column was renamed to Dorothy Dix Talks and under that name was to become the world's longest-running newspaper feature.

The column's widespread popularity began in 1923 when Dix signed with the Philadelphia-based Public Ledger Syndicate. At various times the column was published in 273 papers. At its peak in 1940, Dix was receiving 100,000 letters a year and her estimated reading audience was about 60 million in countries including United States, UK, Australia, New Zealand, South America, China, and Canada. One of her most famous single columns was Dictates for a Happy Life, a ten-point plan for happiness, which had to be frequently reprinted due to popular demand. In addition to her newspaper columns, Dix was the author of books such as How to Win and Hold a Husband and Every-Day Help for Every-Day People.

In addition to her advice columns, Dix was known for her reporting of murder trials. She earned her national reputation under the term of sob sister during the 15 years she worked for William Randolph Hearst's New York Evening Journal as its leading crime reporter, concentrating mostly on murders and trials. Dix covered every high-profile case in New York until 1917 when she returned full time to writing her advice column, "Dorothy Dix Talks." She returned only once to the courtroom for the infamous 1926 Hall-Mills trial after the New York Evening Post offered a staggering $1,000 a week. In this case, a socially prominent clergyman, Edward Hall, was found deceased with the body of Eleanor Mills, a singer in the choir and wife of the church janitor. She was shot three times and her throat slit. Frances Noel Stevens Hall, the wife of Edward Hall, stood trial for murder, but a jury found her not guilty.

== Feminism and suffrage ==
Dix wrote columns and other material that brought attention to women, and she also appeared at suffrage events. In a column called "The Ordinary Woman," she urged readers to regard domestic work highly. "Women who are toiling over cooking-stoves, slaving at sewing-machines, pinching and economizing to educate and cultivate their children.... the Ordinary Woman is the real heroine of life," she wrote. Dix also encouraged women to work outside of the home in her writings and speeches.

Participating in the suffrage movement, Dix spoke at the 34th annual National American Suffrage Convention, which was marked by the inaugural International Woman Suffrage Conference, at the First Presbyterian Church in Washington, D.C., Feb. 12–18, 1902. Her address, titled "The Woman With the Broom," filled four columns in the Woman's Journal. In her speech, she made a plea "for the domestic woman — the woman who is the mainstay of the world, who is back of every great enterprise and who makes possible the achievements of men — the woman behind the broom, who is the hardest-worked and worst-paid laborer on the face of the earth ...." In New Orleans in 1903, she appeared on a platform with Susan B. Anthony to campaign for woman suffrage. Years later, Dix again spoke to attendees at the National American Suffrage Convention held April 14, 1910, in Washington, D.C. She delivered her address, "The Real Reason Why Women Cannot Vote," by imitating the dialect of the African-American character featured in her "Mirandy" novels.

Along with her pro-suffrage convention speeches and event appearances, Dix penned columns and essays supporting women's right to vote. She wrote a circular for the National American Woman Suffrage Association (NAWSA) outlining the social, political and economic reasons why women should be granted the right to vote. One reason was that "every question of politics affects the home, and particularly affects the woman in the home." Originally published in 1908 in the San Francisco Examiner, the four-page piece addressed taxation, the differences between men and women, household budgets, morals, education, and other arguments in favor of women's suffrage. The circulars, along with novel items such as buttons, stationery, playing cards and other materials that promoted the suffrage movement, were included in a mail-order "Catalog of Suffrage Literature and Supplies" produced by the NAWSA Literature Committee.

In addition to the circulars, Dix wrote three pamphlets on the subject of suffrage between 1912 and 1914. She also served as an editor for the July 1904 edition of Progress, a publication of the NAWSA.

== Legacy ==
Her reputed practice of framing questions to herself to allow her to publish prepared answers gave rise to the Australian term "Dorothy Dixer", an expression widely used in Australia to refer to a question from a member of Parliament to a minister that enables the minister to make an announcement in the form of a reply. In Australian rhyming slang, a "Dorothy" or "Dorothy Dix" refers to a hit for six in cricket.

In Andy Griffith's 1955 version of the song "Make Yourself Comfortable", Griffith tells the story of a man writing a letter to Dix, wanting her advice on the aggressive woman he's on a date with.

A Providence, Rhode Island, newspaper reporter said at a trial, "For years no great American murder-trial looked complete until Dorothy Dix took her place at the press table. Dorothy Dix has arrived. The trial can now proceed.".

In the episode "Here Comes the Bride" of the sitcom The Honeymooners, when Alice Kramden (played by Audrey Meadows), forces her husband, Ralph Kramden (played by Jackie Gleason), to sleep on chairs in the kitchen to allow her sister Agnes (played by Treva Frazee) to share her bedroom because she was upset over marital trouble caused by Ralph, Kramden exclaims "OK, Dorothy Dix, fixer of marriage problems, fix my sleeping problem!"

== Bibliography ==
- Christina Vella, "Dorothy Dix: The World Brought Her Its Secrets", in Louisiana Women: Their Lives and Times, ed. Judith F. Gentry and Janet Allured, pp 195–214. (Athens: University of Georgia Press, 2009)
- David Gudelunas, Confidential to America: Newspaper Advice Columns and Sexual Education (New Brunswick and London: Transaction Publishers. 2008)
- Dorothy Dix, Fables of the Elite (New York: R. F. Fenno & Co, 1902).
- Dorothy Dix, Mirandy (New York: Hearst's International Library, 1914).
- Harnett Thomas Kane, Dear Dorothy Dix: The Story of A Compassionate Woman (Garden City, New York: Doubleday, 1952).
- Jan Onofrio, Tennessee Biographical Dictionary (Santa Barbara, California: Somerset Publisher's, Inc. 2000).
