= Nixola Greeley-Smith =

American journalist

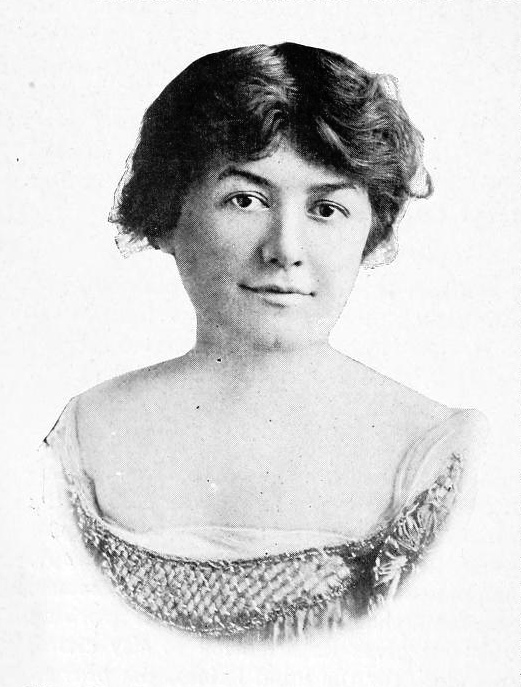
- Born: April 5, 1880; Chappaqua, New York, U.S.
- Died: March 9, 1919 (aged 38); New York City, U.S.
- Occupation: Journalist
- Employer: The Evening World
- Spouse: Andrew Watres Ford
- Relatives: Horace Greeley (grandfather)

Nixola Greeley-Smith (April 5, 1880 – March 9, 1919) was an American suffragist and a journalist at New York's The Evening World. She was known for her interviews and coverage of the home front during World War One. In 1913 it was said that her famous grandfather ("Go West Young Man") was now best known as Greeley Smith's grandfather.

== Life ==
Greeley-Smith was born in Chappaqua, New York, to Colonel Nicholas Smith, a New York City lawyer and diplomat, and Ida Lillian Greeley, who died when she was two. Her grandfather was the notable newspaper editor Horace Greeley and he left his fortune to Greeley-Smith's mother.

She worked at Joseph Pulitzer's papers and developed a distinctive style to her human interest stories and interviews. Nixola Greeley-Smith initially worked in St Louis before being based at The Evening World in New York. She covered home front activities during World War I and was an advocate and activist for women's suffrage. She notably interviewed Sarah Bernhardt and she was known for securing interviews with people of high status and for her unflinching questions and willingness to address controversial subjects. Mary Heaton Vorse said, "I pity the unwary who are interviewed by Nixola Greeley-Smith."

When she started writing for The Tacoma Times in 1913 it was said that her famous grandfather ("Go West Young Man") was now best known as Greeley Smith's grandfather. She worked for the New York World until her death.

She married Andrew Watres Ford, a newspaper editor. They had no children and she died following an operation for acute appendicitis in 1919. She died in a New York hospital and she is buried at Green-Wood Cemetery in Brooklyn with other members of her family.

== See also ==
- Kate Carew, caricaturist
