= Question time =

Parliamentary procedures

Question time is a question-and-answer session on the floor of a legislature, whereby a minister takes questions from Members of Parliament. The practice exists in some form in most parliamentary democracies, but is particularly associated with the Westminster system; in such systems, it is usually a daily feature of the order paper, though it can be cancelled in exceptional circumstances (usually only with the agreement of the opposition). The United Kingdom and some other countries have special question times for asking questions to the Prime Minister.

In practice, the questions asked in question time are sometimes pre-arranged by party leaders, although they are usually asked without notice. Questions from government backbenchers are either intended to allow a minister to highlight government policy successes, or to critique the opposition. Question time is often widely broadcast on national radio and television, making it one of the main opportunities for MPs (particularly in the opposition) to get their views across to the public.

== Westminster system ==
=== Australia ===
"Question Time" by the Parliamentary Education Office

House Question Time, formally known as questions without notice, is an institution in the Commonwealth Parliament and in all state parliaments. Questions to government ministers normally alternate between government members and the opposition, with the opposition going first. Questions of ministers are generally asked by their counterpart shadow ministers (or in the case of a minister and corresponding shadow minister are each members of a different House of Parliament, then the shadow minister's representative in the other House asked questions to the relevant minister) in the opposition, and are always asked by backbenchers on the government side. In the House of Representatives, the first question is usually asked of the prime minister by the Leader of the Opposition. Similar arrangements apply in the Senate. To accommodate the distribution of ministers between both chambers, ministers also take on representative roles, answering questions relating to portfolios that are not their own because the responsible minister sits in the other chamber. This allows questioners to ask questions about any government portfolio in either chamber. This normally includes the Leader of the Government in the Senate representing the prime minister in response to questions asked by senators about general government policy. Sometimes a government Minister will arrange for a government backbencher to "ask" a question, commonly called a Dorothy Dixer, to enable the Minister to make a political speech or otherwise score political points.

Convention allows the prime minister in the House, and the Leader of the Government in the Senate, to terminate question time by asking that "further questions be placed on the Notice Paper". This is not a formal motion but an indication that, even if further questions were asked, ministers would not answer them since they are not compelled to do so. It is possible in this way to prematurely terminate question time, although this is rare in the House and essentially unheard of in the Senate. During the Keating Government, the prime minister attempted to limit the number of questions asked in a way the Liberal Opposition disapproved of. To protest the change, the Opposition made random quorum calls through the afternoon for every question they felt they had been denied that day. In the House, question time is generally scheduled from 2pm to 3:15 pm on every sitting day; in the Senate, it generally occurs from 2pm to 3pm. Apart from divisions, it is the only time the chamber is likely to be filled.

Tactically, it is considered an important defining characteristic for an Opposition Leader to be able to ask a pertinent question of the prime minister or premier, or to single out perceived weak performers in the Ministry.

Interjections from both government and opposition members in the House of Representatives and the Senate are common, and broadly speaking are an accepted practice, although the speaker of the House or the president of the Senate will intervene if interjections become too frequent, if they contain inappropriate content, or if the member interjecting is disrupting debate. Given that question time is the only time of day when all members of Parliament are in their respective chambers, the appearance of question time can be rowdy and boisterous compared to the normally sedate activity during the rest of the day.

In the past, questions and answers had no time limits, only an expectation that ministers would wind up their answers after a "reasonable" amount of time, whatever constituting reasonable being entirely at the discretion of the Chair. Prime Minister Paul Keating famously gave answers exceeding 10 and sometimes 15 minutes, leading to frequent complaints from the opposition. Following the 2010 federal election, changes to the standing orders imposed a 45-second time limit for questions and a four-minute time limit for answers in the House of Representatives. This was reduced to 30 seconds for questions and three minutes for answers when the standing orders were again amended following the 2022 federal election. In the Senate, a questioner may ask an initial question and two supplementary questions related to their initial question. Each question has a one-minute time limit. Answers to initial questions are limited to three minutes, and answers to supplementary questions are limited to one minute. A senator may also move to 'take note' of a minister's answer after question time, allowing questioners (generally Opposition senators) to respond to the answers provided by ministers.

It is very common for points of order to be raised during question time on the issue of relevance, as a Minister answering questions will normally attempt to redirect the answer to an attack on their opponents. However, as long as the Minister is talking on the general subject of the matter raised in the question, it is usually considered relevant to the question, even if it does not address the specific issue raised in the question at all. Part of the reason question time would be longer and cover fewer questions in the past was because until 2012, there was no limit on the amount of points of order on relevance that could be raised. In August 2012 the Standing Orders were amended so that only one point of order on relevance per question could be raised, as part of an effort to make question time less disruptive.

State parliaments adopt similar practices to the federal Parliament with the exception of the Parliament of Victoria, where, since 2015, government backbenchers are no longer entitled to ask questions during question time. As a replacement, ministers can make two-minute ministerial statements to the chamber (see Dorothy Dixer).

Question time has been broadcast on ABC Radio since 1946 and televised since 1991 by the Australian Broadcasting Corporation.

There is a common misconception that question time is about asking questions to ministers as there are uncommon occurrences of questions being asked to members of Parliament who are not ministers.

=== Canada ===
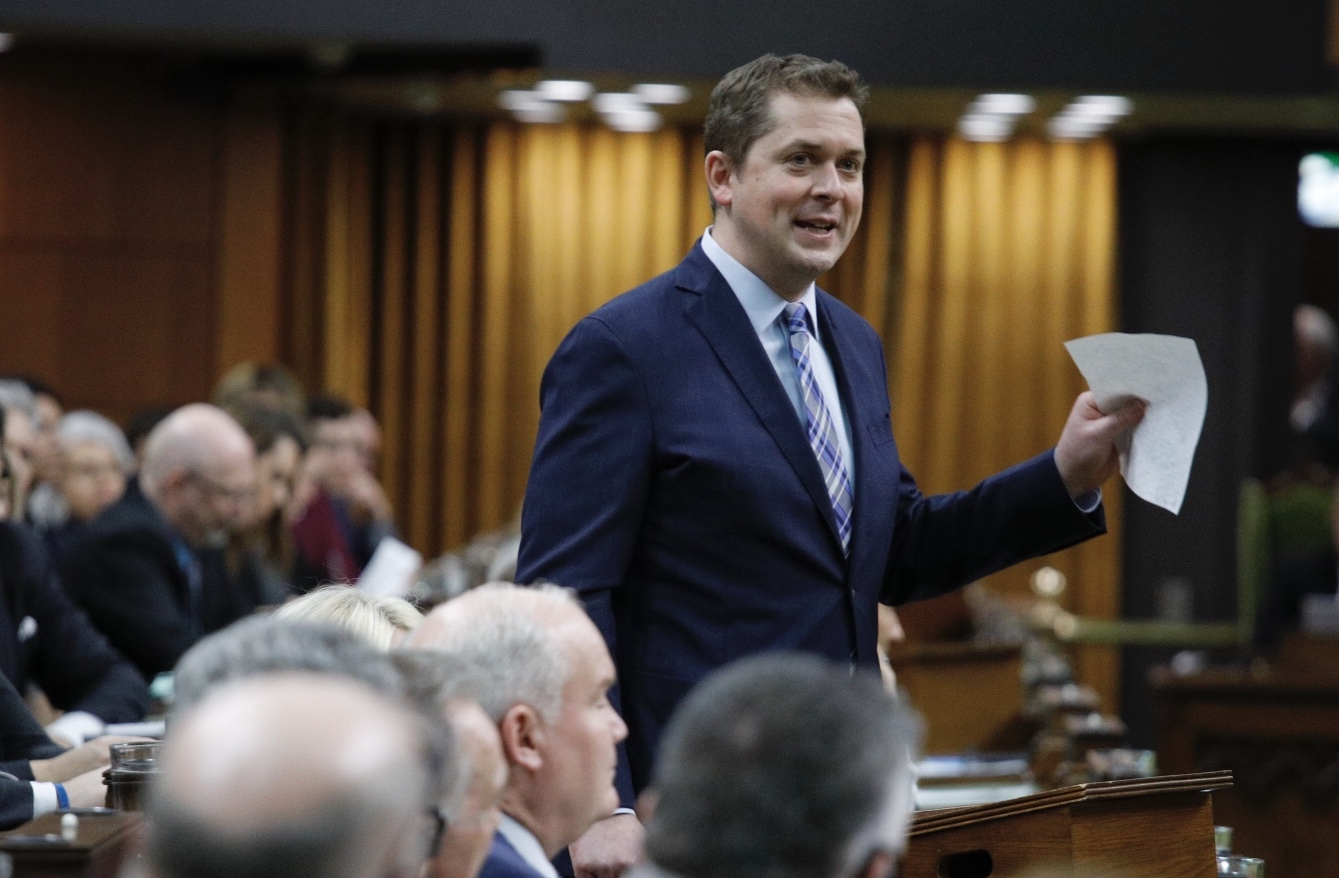
A Canadian Member of Parliament, in this case then-Leader of the Opposition Andrew Scheer, poses a question during Question Period in March 2019

Question time in the House of Commons of Canada, colloquially referred to as Question Period, and formally known as Oral Questions, occurs during each sitting day in the House of Commons. The questions may be posed to either the prime minister of Canada, or any minister of the Cabinet of Canada.

In addition to the House of Commons of Canada, question period is also a convention that is practiced in the various legislative bodies of the provinces and territories of Canada. Like the federal House of Commons, Question Period in the Legislative Assembly of British Columbia, Legislative Assembly of Manitoba, and the Legislative Assembly of Ontario is formally known as Oral Questions. In the Quebec National Assembly, the practice is called Oral Questions and Answers.

=== Ireland ===
In the Oireachtas, Ireland's parliament, questions are asked in Dáil Éireann, the lower house, to which the government of Ireland is responsible. The Ceann Comhairle (speaker) has wide discretion on allowing questions, which are directed to the minister in charge of the relevant Department of state. A question may be answered by any cabinet minister due to cabinet collective responsibility, or by a (non-cabinet) Minister of State at the relevant Department of state. Questions requiring departmental research may not have an answer available within the three-day notice period; these tend to be submitted for written rather than oral response. The Ceann Comhairle may permit a supplementary question to an oral response. Reforms in 2016 at the start of the 32nd Dáil created separate time slots for different types of question, and empower the Ceann Comhairle to demand a further response if the initial one is deemed inadequate.

Standard schedule for questions in Dáil Éireann
Type of question	Duration (mins)			Asked by	Asked of	Notes
Type of question	Tues	Weds	Thur	Asked by	Asked of	Notes
Leaders' Qs	32	32	32	leader of an opposition parliamentary group	Taoiseach (prime minister)	Questions not submitted in advance, typically relate to current news events.
Taoiseach's Parliamentary Qs	45	45	—	any Teachta Dála (TD; Dáil deputy)	Taoiseach (prime minister)	
Minister's Parliamentary Qs	90	90	90	any Teachta Dála (TD; Dáil deputy)	Government ministers in rotation	The parliamentary groups share five "priority questions" proportionately; remaining time is spent on questions picked by lottery.
Qs on Promised Legislation	—	30	15	any Teachta Dála (TD; Dáil deputy)	Government ministers in rotation	Question must relate to a bill introduced by, or secondary legislation made by, the minister
Private Notice Q.	occasional			any Teachta Dála (TD; Dáil deputy)	Government minister	Question submitted at short notice on an urgent matter.

=== Japan ===
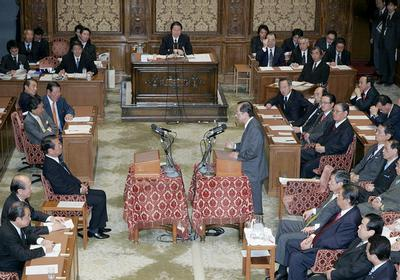
Ichirō Ozawa and Yasuo Fukuda debate each other during a Question Time session in January 2008.

The Diet of Japan held its first question time (党首討論, tōshu tōron) on 10 November 1999; the first question asked to Prime Minister Keizo Obuchi was "Prime Minister, what did you have for breakfast this morning?". Japan's question time was closely modeled after that of the UK, and many Diet members travelled to the House of Commons to study the British application of the concept.

According to the Prime Minister's Official Residence HP, it is called "Deliberation between Party Leaders" in English. Question time is 45 minutes long and questions are limited to the leaders of parliamentary caucuses (which must consist of at least ten members of either house). Although it is generally held every week while the Diet is in session, it may be cancelled with the agreement of the opposition: this often happens during the budgeting period and at other times when the prime minister must sit in the Diet.

=== Malaysia ===
Speaker Johari Abdul of the Dewan Rakyat, the elected house of the Parliament of Malaysia, announced in February 2023 that the upcoming sitting would see the introduction of both Prime Minister's Questions and Minister's Questions: "We suggest that the session be held every Tuesday for Prime Minister Anwar Ibrahim to answer questions that are addressed to him and on Thursday, there will be the Minister's Question Time (MQT) session." He described this as a pilot, and said that amendments to the house's standing orders would be required to make question time a regular part of parliamentary proceedings.

=== New Zealand ===
==== Oral questions ====
Questions asked to ministers must be concise and related to the area of the minister's responsibility. Questions require that all facts be authenticated. Before a question is asked it is checked that it meets the requirements of the House's standing orders, before being transmitted to the relevant ministers.

In New Zealand oral questions are asked at 2pm on each sitting day. Twelve principal oral questions are asked, with supplementary questions also given that must relate to the initial subject matter. The opportunity to ask questions is equally shared amongst the members of the house, excluding ministers. Urgent questions, while possible, are uncommon.

The question is addressed to the portfolio of the minister receiving the question, and the questioner must ask the question as written. Once a question is asked, supplementary questions can be asked.

It is a common tactic for the opposition to ask the prime minister if they stand by their government's statements and actions. Such questions are designed to hinder the prime minister's ability to prepare answers in advance, as they allow for supplementary questions to cover almost any topic without first being submitted in writing.

SKY News New Zealand broadcasts this session from 2pm to the conclusion of questioning. Also, New Zealand's free-to-air digital television network, Freeview, provides live coverage of the debating chamber when it is in session on Parliament TV.

==== Written questions ====
There is no limit to the written questions that any MP can ask and can be submitted each working day before 10.30am. Submission and publication of the question is an electronic process with no hard copy record. Ministers have 6 days to respond to a question.

=== Singapore ===
Each day that the Parliament of Singapore sits has the first one and a half hours of the meeting allocated to Question Time. MPs submit questions in advance, and only questions listed on the Order Paper for the sitting day may be dealt with during Question Time. Questions which are not dealt with during the sitting may be "rolled over" to another sitting day, or answered in writing. After a question is answered orally in Parliament, MPs may raise supplementary questions. According to Speaker Tan Chuan-Jin, the sequencing of questions for Question Time is entirely at the Speaker's discretion: "As Speaker, I will decide the sequence of PQs on the Order Paper for a Sitting. No strict formula is involved, other than exercising reasonable judgement." Describing his approach to presiding over Question Time, Tan has said: "I will be permissive and expansive where possible to optimise productive exchanges. For instance, after the Minister’s verbal reply, I will let MPs continue asking Supplementary Questions (SQs) for further clarifications. I will remind both front and back benches to say more with less, so that as many MPs who wish to ask SQs can do so." He has called the tone of Singaporean Question Time "more measured" compared to similar proceedings in other countries.

=== United Kingdom ===
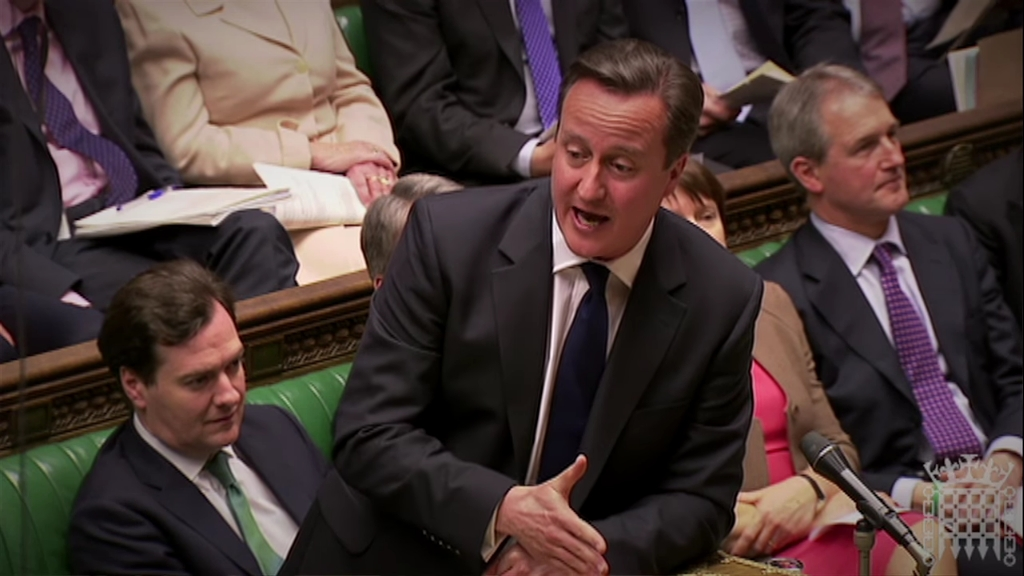
David Cameron answering Prime Minister's Questions in 2012

In the United Kingdom, question time in the House of Commons, officially titled Oral Answers to Questions, lasts for an hour each day from Monday to Thursday (2:30 to 3:30pm on Mondays, 11:30am to 12:30pm on Tuesdays and Wednesdays, and 9:30 to 10:30am on Thursdays). Each Government department has its place in a rota which repeats every four to five weeks when the House is sitting. The larger Departments generally have the full hour for oral questions whereas smaller Departments will have less time allocated. In addition, Questions to the Prime Minister takes place each Wednesday from noon to 12:30pm, and questions are asked each Thursday (Questions to the Leader of House of Commons), about the business of the House the following week.

The larger departments also have a Topical question period for the last 15 minutes of their hour for questions, where the Secretary of State outlines recent developments in their department and then backbench MPs can ask any question relating to their department, for which ministers are not given prior notice. Topical questions have been part of each question time in the Commons since November 2007. For question time, Government whips organize "support groups" of government MPs whose duty it is to support the ministers who answer questions by asking questions helpful to the government and shouting in its support.

In addition to government departments, there are also questions regarding the Church of England, House of Commons reform and Law Rulings.

Questions for oral answer are selected by ballot a few days before the question time takes place and published. Ministers therefore have advance warning of the initial questions, but after each question has been answered, the MP in whose name it appears may ask a supplementary question on the same subject area for which no notice is given (unless the MP chooses to do so privately). The Speaker will usually call other MPs to ask further supplementary questions and this will often include Opposition front bench spokespersons. A second ballot enables MPs to put forward their names to ask a topical question for which no notice is required.

Questions to the prime minister are usually tabled on a topical basis so that the name of the MP is published but not the question itself.

Additionally, each Member of Parliament is entitled to table an unlimited number of written questions. Usually a Private Member directs a question to a Secretary of State, and it is usually answered by a Minister of State or Parliamentary Under Secretary of State. Written Questions are submitted to the Clerks of the Table Office, either on paper or electronically, and are recorded in The Official Report (Hansard) so as to be widely available and accessible.

In the House of Lords, half an hour is put aside each afternoon at the start of the day's proceedings for "Lords Questions". A peer submits a query in advance, which then appears on the Order Paper for the day's proceedings. The Lord shall say: "My Lords, I beg leave to ask the Question standing in my name on the Order Paper". The Minister responsible then answers the query. Afterwards, for around ten minutes, any Lord can ask the Minister questions on the theme of the original put down on the order paper. (For instance, if the question regards immigration, Lords can ask the Minister any question related to immigration during the allowed period). The Lords usually do not have a call list, as the Commons does, so Peers rise to ask a question themselves and they alternate between the Government, opposition and crossbench sides of the chamber. Unlike the Commons, where only the Speaker can call a member to order, any Lord can call any other Lord to order, and on many occasions other Lords intervene to ensure fair distribution of questions around the chamber. If unable to settle who the next speaker is, usually the Leader of the House will intervene. Due to the COVID-19 pandemic, call lists had been in use in the Lords from April 2020 to December 2021 as some Peers participated virtually. A peer may also table up to six questions for written answer on any day the House is sitting.

== Finland ==
In Finland's parliament, Question hour (kyselytunti) is held every Thursday from 4 to 5 p.m. It consists of the Speaker of Parliament to giving all parliamentary groups the opportunity to put at least one question to the prime minister of Finland and his/her ministers. It is broadcast live on public television, particularly on Yle TV1.

== Germany ==
Government ministers are made available to the Bundestag for 35 minutes each Wednesday after the weekly cabinet meeting, during which time they take questions on current matters before the government. This is followed by a further two-hour question-and-answer session consisting of questions that were submitted in advance in writing.

== Hong Kong ==
The questions in the Legislative Council are aimed at seeking information on government actions on specific problems or incidents and on government policies, for the purpose of monitoring the effectiveness of the government.

Questions may be asked at any council meeting except the first meeting of a session, a meeting at which the president (the speaker) of the council is elected, or the Chief Executive delivers the annual policy address to the Council.

No more than 22 questions, excluding urgent questions that may be permitted by the president, may be asked at any one meeting. Replies to questions may be given by designated public officers, usually secretaries, orally or in written form. For questions seeking oral replies, supplementary questions may be put by any member when called upon by the president of the council for the purpose of elucidating that answer. Where there is no debate on a motion with no legislative effect at a meeting, no more than ten questions requiring oral replies may be asked; otherwise, no more than six questions may require an oral reply.

The Chief Executive, who is the head of the region and head of government, attends Question and Answer Session of the council which are held several times in a legislative year. This was introduced to the Legislative Council in 1992 by the Governor of Hong Kong, Chris Patten as Governor's Question Time.

== United States ==
The United States, which has a presidential system of government, does not have a question time for the president. However, Article II, Section 3 of the Constitution of the United States states: "[The president] shall from time to time give to Congress information of the State of the Union, and recommend to their consideration such measures as he shall judge necessary and expedient." The exact meaning of this clause has never been worked out fully, although it is the constitutional basis for the modern State of the Union address. There was some discussion at various times about whether this clause would allow something similar to a Westminster style question time – for instance, having Department Secretaries being questioned by the House of Representatives or the Senate – but the discussions on this issue have never gotten past an exploratory stage.

President George H. W. Bush once said of PMQs, "I count my blessings for the fact I don't have to go into that pit that John Major stands in, nose-to-nose with the opposition, all yelling at each other." In 2008, Senator John McCain (Republican Party nominee for president of the United States in the 2008 presidential election) stated his intention, if elected, to create a presidential equivalent of the British conditional convention of Prime Minister's Questions. In a policy speech on 15 May 2008, which outlined a number of ideas, McCain said, "I will ask Congress to grant me the privilege of coming before both houses to take questions, and address criticism, much the same as the Prime Minister of Great Britain [sic] appears regularly before the House of Commons."

George F. Will of The Washington Post criticized the proposal in an op-ed piece, saying that a presidential question time would endanger separation of powers as the president of the United States, unlike the prime minister of the United Kingdom, is not a member of the legislature. Will ended the piece by saying, "Congress should remind a President McCain that the 16 blocks separating the Capitol from the White House nicely express the nation's constitutional geography."

In February 2009, just over a month after his inauguration, President Barack Obama invited serving members of the US Senate to a "fiscal responsibility" summit at the White House, during which Senators asked the president about his fiscal policies in an event which was compared to Prime Minister's Questions. Eleven months later, Republican House Minority Leader John Boehner invited Obama to the annual House Issues Conference in Baltimore, Maryland, where the president answered questions and criticisms from Republican members of Congress. Commenting on the event, Peter Baker in The New York Times, said "[the] back and forth resembled the British tradition where the prime minister submits to questions on the floor of the House of Commons – something Senator John McCain had promised to do if elected president."

== Hungary ==
In Hungary's Parliament, the hour of immediate questions (azonnali kérdések órája) is held once every week when the National Assembly is in session, for at least 60 minutes. At least one representative from each parliamentary group may ask the Prime Minister or any other member of the government a question. In the first round, opposition groups ask their questions first, in descending order of their number of representatives, then the ruling parties. In the second round, any representative may ask a question, though in practice, there rarely is a second round, so all parties usually ask only one question per session. Although the topic of all questions must be submitted in advance, the Prime Minister does not know the specific content of the question before it is asked (usually the titles are very vague, mostly along the lines of "What do you think about this, Mr. Prime Minister?", thus the ministers don't usually have an opportunity to prepare in advance). 2 minutes are available for both the asking and the answering of a question, after which the member of parliament has 1 minute to reply, then so does the minister being asked.

== See also ==
- Interpellation (politics)
- Parliamentary privilege
