= Suppressive person =

Scientology version of antisocial personality

- Type: Classification in Scientology
- Description: An individual considered hostile to Scientology or its goals, believed to impede spiritual progress
- Consequences: May lead to disconnection by Scientologists
- Key texts: Ethics policies and Scientology justice codes
- Associated controversies: Allegations of social isolation, family separation, retaliatory labeling

Suppressive person, often abbreviated SP, is a term used in Scientology to describe the "antisocial personalities" who, according to Scientology's founder L. Ron Hubbard, make up about 2.5% of the population. A statement on a Church of Scientology website describes this group as including notorious historic figures such as Adolf Hitler.

The term is often applied to those whom the Church perceives as its enemies, such as those whose "disastrous" and "suppressive" acts are said to impede the progress of individual Scientologists or the Scientology movement.

One of the reasons Scientology doctrines portray suppressive persons as such a danger is that they are supposed to make people around them become potential trouble sources (abbreviated PTS). Scientology defines a PTS as "a person who is in some way connected to and being adversely affected by a suppressive person. Such a person is called a potential trouble source because he can be a lot of trouble to himself and to others." Hubbard suggested that the effects of suppressive persons is amplified to cause 20% of the population to be predisposed against Scientology.

== Origins and definitions ==
As with most Scientology terminology, "suppressive person" was coined by L. Ron Hubbard. Ruth A. Tucker writes in her book Another Gospel: Cults, Alternative Religions, and the New Age Movement that the concept appears to have first been introduced into Scientology in the 1960s "as membership grew and as authoritarian control [by Hubbard] increased". Tucker notes that many of those who joined Scientology during this period were "well-educated people who prided themselves in independent thinking [and] struggled with the idea of allowing any other individual to completely dominate their opinions." Many of Hubbard's early writings on suppressive persons focus on their alleged responsibility for poor management within the Church of Scientology.

The church's official glossary defines a suppressive person as being:

a person who possesses a distinct set of characteristics and mental attitudes that cause him to suppress other people in his vicinity. This is the person whose behavior is calculated to be disastrous. Also called antisocial personality.

The church regards these "antisocial personalities" as being those "who possess characteristics and mental attitudes that cause them to violently oppose any betterment activity or group". This concern with "groups" continues in the official Scientology Handbook, which states the corollary: "The antisocial personality supports only destructive groups."

== Policies and practices ==
According to the Hubbard textbook Introduction to Scientology Ethics ("the Ethics book"), when an individual is found to be under the influence of a suppressive person, it is believed that this will affect their general well-being. An individual with an SP in their vicinity is likely to be under stress or frequently upset, and this would potentially jeopardize the stability of any treatment or education. Therefore, a parishioner who is found to have such suppressive connections is not permitted to participate in certain Scientology classes and counseling until the situation has been adequately resolved.

The Ethics book provides a guideline for use in sorting out such a condition. A first step is always to educate the person about the phenomenon of the suppressive person and the effects this is believed to have on the individuals close to the SP. Once the education step is completed, the person can further follow the guidelines to sort out the situation so that the parishioner is no longer negatively affected.

Scientology Security checks are also common for SP and PTS situations. If reasonable attempts have been made to "handle" the situation to no avail, the parishioner may take the option of "disconnecting" from the SP. In Introduction to Scientology Ethics, "disconnection" is defined as a self-determined decision made by an individual that he is not going to be connected to another. It is a severing of communication by one individual against the other.

The concept of the suppressive person in Scientology has been the source of some controversy, due in some part to aversion to the idea of "disconnecting" from close family members and friends.

Another source of controversy related to the suppressive person policies is the administrative judgment that formally labels an individual a "suppressive person". This "suppressive person declaration" is known as an "SP declare". Declares are issued as an "ethics order" on goldenrod-colored paper with blue ink and are approved through the executive over the ethics department as well as the office of the International Justice Chief" (IJC).

Non-Scientologists as well as Scientologists can be and have been labelled suppressive persons. A suppressive person is anyone who has been responsible for "suppressive acts", defined by Hubbard as being "the overt or covert actions or omissions knowingly and willfully undertaken to suppress, reduce, prevent or destroy case gains, and/or the influence of Scn on activities, and/or the continued Scn success and actions on the part of organizations actions and Scientologists." Similarly, entire groups can be declared suppressive; suppressive groups, in Hubbard's view, are "those which seek to destroy Scn or which specialize in injuring or killing persons or damaging their cases or which advocate suppression of mankind." Under this broader definition, suppressiveness included more than just publicly opposing Scientology; it also included any group supporting activities to which Hubbard was strongly opposed, especially psychiatry. Specifically, Hubbard considered reporters and government agents to be members of suppressive groups: "There are no good reporters. There are no good government or SP group agents. The longer you try to be nice, the worse off you will be. And the sooner one learns this, the happier he will be."

The Church of Scientology maintains a central list of ex-members and splinter groups formally declared to be suppressive. In an executive directive of 1992, the Church's "International Justice Chief" lists over 400 groups and over 2,300 individuals considered to be suppressive. The list includes individual ex-Scientologists and breakaway groups regarded as hostile or heretical, such as Erhard Seminars Training (EST).

== Abusive labeling ==
In a lecture he made on 19 July 1966, L. Ron Hubbard expressed concern about the possible abuse of the "suppressive person" label in respect of those who are otherwise good citizens and contribute to civil society:

You should upgrade your idea of what an SP is. Man, meet one sometime! A real one! A real monster....Well, in all the time we've been around here we only had one SP that I know of. One real SP that was on staff.... And I don't know of another single SP that we've ever had on staff. Isn't that interesting. You see all these SP orders and so on...Don't throw it around carelessly, because this is an—a very exaggerated condition, SP.

Some former Scientologists have alleged that there has indeed been such abuse. For example, Bent Corydon describes seeing Scientology franchise holder Gary Smith declared suppressive on the spot during the October 1982 Mission Holders' Conference, simply for not obeying a shouted order to change his seat. There are also instances where SP declarations have disrupted families and businesses.

According to a 2006 article in the St. Petersburg Times titled "SP profiles", one Scientologist found himself declared an SP after he repeatedly challenged the validity of a "patter drill" in which he was instructed to read passages of a course to a wall. He insisted the drill was not based on Hubbard teachings and stated that he had been previously threatened with an SP declaration after a run-in with a Scientology attorney on an unrelated issue.

== Views by religious scholars ==
Those who communicate with suppressive persons can face being branded SPs as well. Associates of the branded SP are ordered to disconnect from that person. Religious scholars have taken a negative view of Scientology's disconnection policies, which includes many who have previously testified on behalf of Scientology. For example, religious scholar J. Gordon Melton stated, "I just think it would be better for all concerned if they just let them go ahead and get out and everyone goes their own way, and not make such a big deal of it. The policy hurts everybody."

== See also ==
- Disconnection (Scientology)
- Excommunication
