= Saint Hill =

Saint Hill may refer to:

- Saint Hill Green, a village near East Grinstead, Sussex, England
- Saint Hill Manor, a 1792 building, which had several notable owners, and now is the head office for the UK branch of the Church of Scientology
