= Mariette Lindstein =

Swedish author and ex-Scientologist (born 1958)

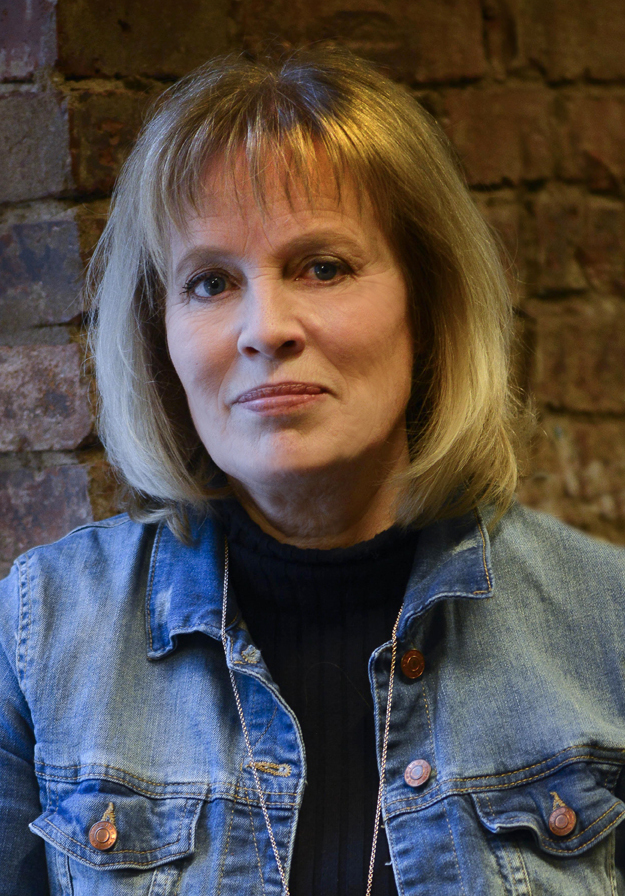
Lindstein in 2017

Mariette Beatrice Lindstein (née Westam, born 19 March 1958 in Halmstad, Sweden) is a Swedish author, lecturer and former Scientologist.

Lindstein made her literary debut in 2015 with the novel The Cult on Fog Island (Sekten på Dimön). It was followed by several sequels. She has also published a memoir.

== Life and career ==
Before becoming an author, Lindstein spent about 25 years in the Church of Scientology. She joined Scientology in Malmö at the age of 19 and soon became a staff member. She was later recruited into the Sea Org along with her then-husband and worked at the church's European headquarters in nearby Copenhagen before moving to the United States where she worked at the Los Angeles headquarters and at Int Base under David Miscavige, whom she describes as erratic and abusive. According to her memoirs, she spent time in the Rehabilitation Project Force and in The Hole. She left the church in 2004.

After leaving Scientology, she contacted Dan Koon, a former colleague from Int Base, who had left Scientology the previous year. They lived together in California where Lindstein worked as a nanny to a family. The couple married in San Francisco in 2011 and shortly after that moved to Sweden. They live in Marbäck, outside of Halmstad. Her son, who grew up in Scientology, later also left the church.

In 2015, she also participated in the Swedish Television (SVT) documentary Den enda sanna vägen (The Only True Way).

== Writing and speaking ==
After moving back to Sweden, Lindstein began writing a novel titled The Cult on Fog Island (Swedish: Sekten på Dimön) about a fictional cult, drawing on her own experiences with Scientology. It was followed by several sequels. Her books have received widespread attention. The first three books sold about 300,000 copies. She also lectures about the dangers of cults. She has described how the nightmares she suffered after leaving Scientology stopped after she started to write The Cult on Fog Island. In 2024 she published her memoirs about her life in Scientology, Lång väg hem (Long Way Home).

== Awards and honours ==
In 2016, she received the Crimetime Specsavers Award for Best Debut Novel.

== See also ==
- Bibliography of books critical of Scientology
