= Scientologists =

Current and former members of Scientology

- Type: Members of Scientology
- Description: Individuals who practice Scientology or participate in its organizations and training programs
- Membership: Estimates vary widely; census data and independent studies report far lower numbers than Church of Scientology claims
- Demographics: Concentrated in the United States and Western Europe, with smaller groups worldwide
- Recruitment: Through courses, personality tests, outreach centers, and affiliated programs
- Associated controversies: Disputed membership figures, high attrition, concerns about recruitment practices

A Scientologist is a person who adheres to the beliefs and practices of Scientology, a movement founded by L. Ron Hubbard in the mid-20th century. The term is used for individuals who participate in Scientology services or training offered by the Church of Scientology, whether as public members or as part of the organization's staff. Estimates of the number of Scientologists vary widely, with the Church claiming worldwide membership in the millions, while national censuses and independent surveys indicate global totals in the tens of thousands.

== Definition ==
A Scientologist is an adherent of the doctrines and practices of Scientology. The Church of Scientology states that "Scientologist" is a collective membership mark indicating membership in affiliated Scientology churches and missions.

Public Scientologists are those individuals who are not staff. They pay the Church of Scientology for training or auditing services, and live and work independently of the organization. Collectively, non-staff Scientologists may be referred to as "members", the "public", or the "field". Even though public members are not employed by the organization, they are ranked within the Church's chain of command and defer to all staff personnel, who are regarded as their seniors. Public members are frequently pressed into service for clerical or promotional tasks or to recruit new members. Public members who recruit people for Scientology services are called "field staff members" (FSMs) and are paid a commission of 10%–15% of the amount their recruit pays for a service.

Scientologists not in trouble with the ethics department are considered "in good standing" and are allowed to be on Church of Scientology premises, receive services, and attend events. Those who practice Scientology‑derived techniques outside the Church in what is known as the Free Zone, or independent Scientology, are not recognized by the Church.

== Membership statistics ==
It is difficult to obtain reliable membership statistics. The International Association of Scientologists (IAS), the official Church of Scientology membership system since 1984, has never released figures. Other Church spokespeople have cited membership numbers in the millions, though that represents a cumulative number of anyone who ever took a service or purchased a book from the organization. Census and survey data have shown those numbers to be greatly exaggerated, and census tallies are declining in several countries.

=== Census and survey data ===
(in decreasing order of membership)

United States
A 2008 survey of American religious affiliations by the US Census Bureau estimated there to be 25,000 Americans identifying as Scientologists, as did a 2008 Trinity College survey that also concluded there were 25,000 Scientologists. The American Religious Identification Survey (ARIS) found 45,000 Scientologists in the United States in 1990, 55,000 in 2001, and 25,000 in 2008.

Germany
In 2005, the German Office for the Protection of the Constitution estimated a total of 5,000–6,000 Scientologists in the country, and mentioned a count of 12,000 according to Scientology Germany. Germany's government counted 3,600 German members in 2021.

United Kingdom
The 2001 United Kingdom census contained a voluntary question on religion, to which approximately 48,000,000 chose to respond. Of those living in England and Wales who responded, a total of 1,781 said they were Scientologists. The 2021 census in England and Wales recorded 1,800 Scientologists.

Australia
In 2006, Australia's national census recorded 2,507 Scientologists nationwide, up from 1,488 in 1996, and 2,032 in 2001. The 2011 census however found a decrease of 13.7 percent from the 2006 census. The Australian census reported 1,488 Scientologists in 1996 and 2,032 in 2001, before dropping to under 1,700 in 2016.

Canada
Statistics Canada, the national census agency, reported numbers of Scientologists as: 1,215–1,220 in 1991, 1,525 in 2001, 1,745 in 2011, and 1,380 in 2021.

Switzerland
In 2011, SonntagsZeitung reported that support for Scientology in Switzerland had experienced a steady decline from 3,000 registered members in 1990 to 1,000 members and the organization was said to be facing extinction in the country. A Church of Scientology spokesperson rejected the figures claiming that the organization had 5,000 "passive and active members in Switzerland".

New Zealand
In the 2006 New Zealand census, 357 people identified themselves as Scientologists, although a spokesperson for the organization said there were between 5,000 and 6,000 Scientologists in the country. Earlier census figures were 207 in the 1991 census, 219 in 1996, and 282 in 2001.

Finland
In 2011, the "Scientology Association of Finland" had approximately 120 members.

Across all countries with available data, the number of self-identified Scientologists is small and in many cases declining.

=== Independent estimates ===
One 2014 estimate indicates there were about 30,000 Scientologists. An estimate given by former high-level Church of Scientology employee Jefferson Hawkins in 2011 was of 40,000. In his 2008 book, John Duignan estimated "no more than 50,000 members around the world", and that the staff in each Scientology center was no more than 20 people.

Andersen and Wellendorf estimated that there were between 2000 and 4000 Scientologists in Denmark in 2009, with contemporary estimates suggesting between 500 and 1000 active Scientologists in Sweden. Observers have suggested between 2000 and 4000 in France.

=== Church membership claims ===
The organization has said that it has eight to fifteen million members worldwide, but this figure is known to be an aggrandizing fabrication. Religious scholar J. Gordon Melton has said that the organization's estimates of its membership numbers are exaggerated: "You're talking about anyone who ever bought a Scientology book or took a basic course. Ninety-nine percent of them don't ever darken the door of the church again." Melton has stated that if the claimed figure of 4 million American Scientologists were correct, "they would be like the Lutherans and would show up on a national survey".

By the start of the 21st century, the organization was claiming it had 8 million members. Several commentators observe that this number is cumulative rather than collective: that is, it represents the total number of people who had any interaction with the Scientology organization since its founding, some of whom only had one or two auditing sessions. The organization also maintained that it was the world's fastest growing religion, a title also claimed by several other groups including Mormons, modern Pagans, and Baháʼí.

== Demographics ==
Scientologists are found mostly in the US, Europe, South Africa and Australia. Within the US, higher rates of Scientology have been observed in the western states, especially those bordering the Pacific Ocean, than further east.

Internationally, the Scientology organization's members are largely middle-class. In Australia, Scientologists have been observed as being wealthier and more likely to work in managerial and professional roles than the average citizen.

Scientology is oriented toward individualistic and liberal economic values; the scholar of religion Susan J. Palmer observed that Scientologists display "a capitalist ideology that promotes individualistic values". Interviewing members of the Church of Scientology in the United States, Westbrook found that most regarded themselves as apolitical, Republicans, or libertarians; fewer than 10 percent supported the Democratic Party. A survey of Danish Scientologists likewise revealed that nearly all voted for liberal or conservative parties on the right of Denmark's political spectrum and took a negative view of socialism. Placing great emphasis on the freedom of the individual, those surveyed believed that the state and its regulations held people down, and felt that the Danish welfare system was excessive.

== Recruitment ==
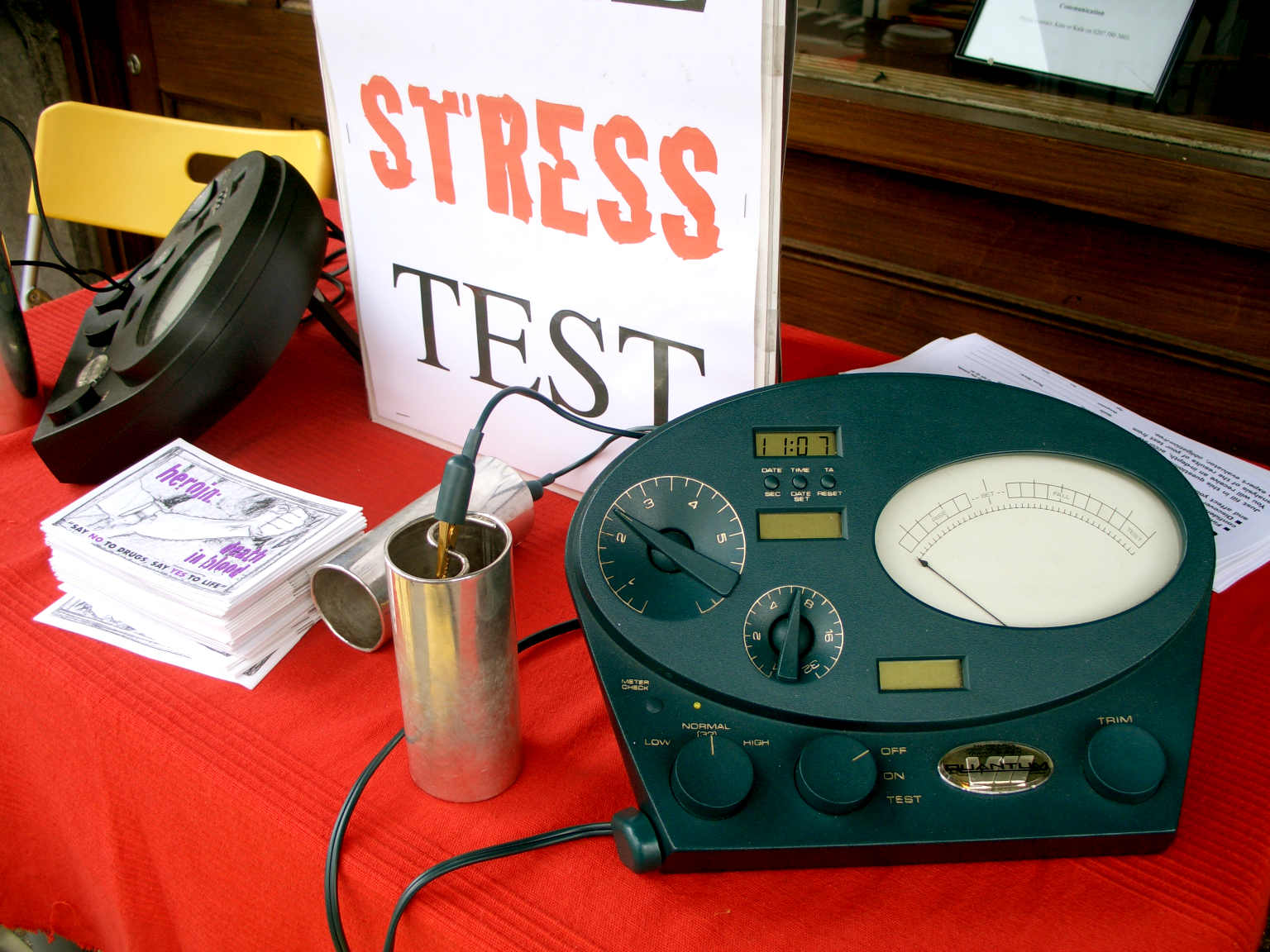
Scientology stress tests being offered on public sidewalk

Most people who join the organization are introduced to it via friends and family. It also offers free "personality tests" or "stress tests", typically involving an E-Meter, to attract potential recruits. It hopes that if non-Scientologists purchase one service from the organization and feel a benefit from it – a "win" in Scientology terminology – they are more likely to purchase additional services from it. Other recruitment methods include lectures and classes introducing non-Scientologists to the subject.

The Church of Scientology's own statistics, published in 1998, reveal that 52.6% of those who joined did so through their family and friendship networks with existing members. 18% were drawn in through personality tests, 4.8% through publicity, and 3.1% through lectures. Westbrook's interviews with members determined that most people who joined the organization were initially attracted by "the practical benefits advertised". Westbrook found that various members deepened their involvement after having what they considered to be a spiritual experience, such as exteriorization or a past life memory, in their first few weeks of involvement.

== Notable Scientologists ==
The list below contains names of public Scientologists. For Scientologists who are, or were, on staff, see Scientology officials § List of Scientology officials. This list includes members who were still Scientologists in the Church of Scientology at the time of their death.

A

- Kirstie Alley (1951–2022) actress.
- Anne Archer (b. 1947) actress, and mother of former Scientology spokesperson Tommy Davis.
- Emily Armstrong (b. 1986) rock singer, lead singer of Linkin Park since 2024.
- Jennifer Aspen (b. 1970) actress.

B

- James Barbour (b. 1966) Broadway actor and singer.
- Lynsey Bartilson (b. 1983) actress.
- Paul Beaver (1925-1975) musician.
- Catherine Bell (b. 1968) actress.
- Steve Berra (b. 1973) professional skateboarder.
- Karen Black (1939–2013) actress.
- Sonny Bono (1935–1998) entertainer and congressman, identified as a Scientologist by his ex-wife who stated that "Sonny did try to break away at one point, and they made it very difficult for him".
- Tim Bowles, Scientologist since 1975. Attorney who has represented Scientology and worked for some of the Church's organizations.
- Stephen Boyd (1931–1977) actor, rose to OT IV, utilized Scientology techniques while filming a movie in Louisiana.

C

- David Campbell (b. 1948) composer.
- Elena Cardone, wife of Grant Cardone and major donor to Scientology.
- Grant Cardone (b. 1958) CEO of Cardone Capital, reached the OT VIII level.
- Nancy Cartwright (b. 1957) voice-over actress, voice of Bart Simpson.
- Kate Ceberano (b. 1966) actress and musician; a third-generation-Scientologist; her grandmother worked as a governess for the children of Scientology founder L. Ron Hubbard.
- Erika Christensen (b. 1982) actress, raised Scientologist.
- Stanley Clarke (b. 1951) musician and composer.
- John Coale (b. 1946) American lawyer, married to Greta Van Susteren.
- Keith Code, motorcycle racer.
- Tom Constanten (b. 1944) former keyboardist for the Grateful Dead.
- Chick Corea (1941–2021) musician.
- Tom Cruise (b. 1962) actor.

D

- Sky Dayton (b. 1971) founder of EarthLink.
- France D'Amour (b. 1964) singer songwriter.
- Greg and Janet Deering (?) founders and owners of Deering Banjo Company.
- Eddie Deezen (b. 1957) actor and comedian.
- Doug Dohring (1957–2023) ex-owner of Neopets and father of Jason Dohring.
- Jason Dohring (b. 1982) actor, raised Scientologist.
- Denice Duff (b. 1965) actress.
- Robert Duggan (b. 1944) billionaire investor and CEO.
- Trish Duggan, American glass artist and philanthropist, was the world's top donor to Church of Scientology causes as of 2019.

E

- Bodhi Elfman (b. 1969) actor.
- Jenna Elfman (b. 1971) actress.
- Richard Elfman (b. 1949) writer and director.

F

- Chloe Fineman (b. 1988) American actress and comedian.
- Stacy Francis (b. 1966) singer.
- Doug E. Fresh (b. 1966) Producer and rapper.

G

- Peaches Geldof (1989–2014) columnist, television personality, and model.
- Denise (Miscavige Licciardi) Gentile (b. 1960) twin sister of David Miscavige and former executive at Digital Lightwave.

H

- Isaac Hayes (1942–2008) musician and actor.
- Nicky Hopkins (1944–1994) musician.

I

- Gary Imhoff (b. 1952) actor.
- Robert Indermaur (b. 1947) Swiss painter and sculptor.
- Mark Isham (b. 1951) musician and film music composer.

J

- Craig Jensen (?) founder of Condusiv Technologies, formerly known as Diskeeper Corporation.
- Brent A. Jones (b. 1963) politician, lawyer and business owner.

K

- Kerri Kasem (b. 1972) radio host, daughter of Casey Kasem.
- Milton Katselas (1933–2008) acting teacher.
- Vivian Kubrick (b. 1960) filmmaker, composer and daughter of Stanley Kubrick.

L

- Charles Lakes (b. 1964) elite gymnast and Olympian.
- Geoffrey Lewis (1935–2015) actor.
- Noah Lottick (1966–1990) Scientologist whose suicide was the focus of the Time magazine article "The Thriving Cult of Greed and Power".

M

- Alanna Masterson (b. 1988) actress.
- Christopher Masterson (b. 1980) actor.
- Danny Masterson (b. 1976) actor.
- Jordan Masterson (b. 1986) actor.
- Duncan James McNair, 3rd Baron McNair (b. 1947) member of the Board of Commissioners for Citizens Commission on Human Rights International.
- Lisa McPherson (1959–1995) woman whose death has been a source of controversy for the church.
- Jim Meskimen (b. 1959) actor and improviser.
- Julia Migenes (b. 1943) opera singer.
- Sofia Milos (b. 1969) actress.
- Elisabeth Moss (b. 1982) actress, raised a Scientologist.
- Tony Muhammad (?) anti-vaccination activist and 2017 recipient of a Freedom Medal award from the International Association of Scientologists.
- Floyd Mutrux (b. 1941) film director and writer.

N

- Haywood Nelson (b. 1960) actor.
- Marisol Nichols (b. 1973) actress.
- Judy Norton [aka Judy Taylor] (b. 1958) actress.

P

- Eduardo Palomo (1962–2003) actor.
- Don Pearson (?) former management consultant (trainer) who taught Hubbard administrative techniques to executives and managers.
- Michael Peña (b. 1976) actor.
- Elli Perkins (1949–2003) businesswoman; who was murdered by her son who suffered from an untreated mental illness.
- Jade Pettyjohn (?) actress.
- Jeff Pomerantz (b. 1943) actor.
- David Pomeranz (b. 1951) singer, songwriter, composer.
- Kelly Preston (1962–2020) actress.
- Lee Purcell (b. 1947) actress.

R

- Georgina Reilly (b. 1986) actress.
- Patrick Renna (b. 1979) actor.
- Giovanni Ribisi (b. 1974) actor, raised Scientologist.
- Marissa Ribisi (b. 1974) actress, raised Scientologist.
- Michael D. Roberts (b. 1947) actor.
- Ruddy Rodríguez (b. 1967) actress.

S

- Pablo Santos (1987–2006) actor.
- Harriet Schock (b. 1941) singer/songwriter who has reached Operating Thetan VIII.
- Billy Sheehan (b. 1953) rock bassist.
- Juliet Simms (b. 1986) musician, former contestant on The Voice.
- Dylan Sprayberry (b. 1998), actor.
- Michelle Stafford (b. 1965) actress.
- Ethan Suplee (b. 1976) actor.

T

- Ian Tampion (1938–1997) Australian rules footballer who fought legal proceedings to have Scientology recognised in Australia as a church.
- John Travolta (b. 1954) actor.

V

- Greta Van Susteren (b. 1954) television show host, married to fellow Scientologist and lawyer John Coale.

W

- Edgar Winter (b. 1946) musician.
- Mick Woodmansey (b. 1950) rock drummer, part of David Bowie's backing band The Spiders from Mars.

== Former Scientologists ==
A

- Larry Anderson (b. 1952; left 2009) Actor, star of Orientation: A Scientology Information Film, left the church in 2009 and requested his money back.
- Gerry Armstrong (b. 1946; left 1981) Former Sea Org member for ten years and involved in a series of Scientology related lawsuits, collectively Church of Scientology of California v. Armstrong.
- Jon Atack (b. 1955; left 1983) Whistleblower and noted critic of the church.

B

- Allen Barton (b. 1968; left 2012) Playwright and acting teacher who would later become an outspoken critic of the church.
- Jason Beghe (b. 1960; left 2007) Actor, rose to Operating Thetan level V (OT V), left Scientology and subsequently spoke out publicly against the church in 2008. He joined the church through Milton Katselas' acting class, connecting with Bodhi Elfman and Mary Thompson.
- Cedric Bixler-Zavala (b. 1974; left 2017) Musician.
- Nazanin Boniadi (b. 1980) Actress, her mother was a Scientologist. She left the Church after a stint as Tom Cruise's girlfriend, after which the Church of Scientology put her on an RPF-style regimen of humiliating manual labor, confessionals, and required the signing of a non-disclosure agreement.
- Kate Bornstein (b. 1948; left 1981) Transgender author, playwright, performance artist and gender theorist. Was previously a spokesperson for Scientology.
- Mitch Brisker (b. 1949; left 2020) Producer.
- John Brodie (1935–2026) American football player, credited Dianetics with his recovery from a sports injury; left after some of his friends "were expelled and harassed during a power struggle with church management".
- Stacy Brooks (b. 1952; left 1989) Former managing editor of Freedom magazine and a Scientologist for over twenty years. She has since become president of the Lisa McPherson Trust and an expert witness in many high-profile Scientology lawsuits.
- William S. Burroughs (1914–1997; left 1960s) Author and poet. Joined and left the church during the 1960s. In talking about the experience, he claimed that the techniques and philosophy of Scientology helped him and that he felt that further study into Scientology would produce great results. He was skeptical of the church itself, and felt that it fostered an environment that did not accept critical discussion. His subsequent critical writings about the church and his review of Inside Scientology by Robert Kaufman led to a battle of letters between Burroughs and Scientology supporters in the pages of Rolling Stone magazine. He wrote the book Ali's Smile: Naked Scientology.

C

- Diana Canova (b. 1953; left 1993) Actress; critical of Scientology's "straightforward" desire for money.
- Tory Christman (b. 1947; left 2000) Whistleblower and noted critic of the church.

D

- Robert DeGrimston (b. 1935; left 1962) With wife, Marry Anne DeGrimston, founder of The Process Church of The Final Judgment.
- Richard de Mille (1922–2009; left 1954) Author and journalist; at one point a personal assistant to L. Ron Hubbard.
- John Duignan (b. 1963; left 2006) Former Sea Org member, spent 22 years in Scientology, and blew in 2006. In 2008 he published his memoir The Complex: An Insider Exposes the Covert World of the Church of Scientology.

E

- Dennis Erlich (b. 1947; left 1982) Former high-ranking official in the church and later critic of Scientology who joined the alt.religion.scientology discussion group on Usenet in late July 1994.

F

- Michael Fairman (b. 1934; left 2011) Actor.
- Steven Fishman (b. 1949) ex-Scientologist whose court case is the origin of the Fishman affidavit or Fishman papers.

G

- Neil Gaiman (b. 1960) Novelist, graphic novelist, and screenwriter. He is the son of David Gaiman and was raised a Scientologist in East Grinstead.
- Philip Gale (1978–1998) Massachusetts Institute of Technology student and primary developer of EarthLink's ISP software. Raised as a Scientologist, and quit Scientology while working at Earthlink. Died by suicide in 1998.
- Frank A. Gerbode (left 1982) American psychologist who based his method known as traumatic incident reduction (TIR) on Scientology practices.

H

- Paul Haggis (b. 1953; left 2009) Film director, Academy Award winner; Left in response to the San Diego branch's public support of California Proposition 8 and other factors. He progressed up to OT VII in the 1980s where he remained until he left the church.
- Beck Hansen (b. 1970; left 2019) Musician who promoted Scientology as a member for many years. Stated in a 2019 interview that he is not a Scientologist and that he doesn't "have any connection or affiliation with it".
- Jefferson Hawkins (left 2001) Former Sea Org member, joined Scientology in 1967, left in 2001 and wrote the book Counterfeit Dreams: One Man's Journey into and Out of the World of Scientology in 2010.
- Marc Headley (b. 1974; left 2005) Whistleblower and critic of the church.
- Katie Holmes (b. 1978; left 2012) Actress and formerly married to Scientologist Tom Cruise.
- Jim Humble (b. 1933; left 1981) Self-published author and founder of the Genesis II Church.
- Robert Hunter (1941–2019; left 1999) Lyricist for the Grateful Dead.

J

- Mark Janicello (1962; left 2003) Actor, Singer and Dramatist. Author of Naked in the Spotlight: My Life with Sex, Singing, and Scientology in German and in English.

K

- Nicole Kidman (b. 1967; left 1992) Actress; Tom Cruise's ex-wife.
- Yolanda Klug (b. 1995/1996–unknown) a former Scientologist who disappeared in 2019.

L

- Jason Lee (b. 1970; left 2016) Actor.
- Arnie Lerma (1950–2018; left 1977) Son of a high-ranking member. Critic of Scientology who posted the Fishman Affidavit, including the Xenu story, to the Internet via the Usenet newsgroup alt.religion.scientology.
- Johnny Lewis (1983–2012) Actor, left Scientology in his early 20s.
- Juliette Lewis (b. 1973; left 2021) Actress.
- Mariette Lindstein (b. 1958; left 2004) Swedish crime author. Worked for Scientology at Int Base under David Miscavige. Left Scientology in 2004 and later became a novelist, publishing her first book The Cult on Fog Island, about a fictional cult, in 2015. Published a memoir about her time in the church in 2024. Married to American ex-scientologist Dan Koon.
- Chuck Lorre (b. 1952; left 70s/80s) Producer, writer, director and composer who was a member of Scientology for 10 years and spent 2 days as a Sea Org recruiter. He worked with Jenna Elfman, a current Scientologist, on Dharma and Greg however when he approached her later about another project, she told him that as he was "blown" and a suppressive person, she could no longer work with him.

M

- Charles Manson (1934–2017) Identified as a Scientologist during his time in prison. He ordered Manson Family member Bruce Davis to journey to the United Kingdom and work for the Scientology organization in London. Manson completed 150 hours of auditing while researching his own religious practices, which borrowed heavily from Scientology.
- Jenna Miscavige Hill (b. 1984; left 2005) Niece of David Miscavige, author and whistleblower.
- Ron Miscavige (1936–2021; left 2012) Father of David Miscavige, author and whistleblower.

O

- Vince Offer (b. 1964; left 2002) Film director of The Underground Comedy Movie and pitchman for ShamWow.

P

- Bijou Phillips (b. 1980; left 2024) Model and actress.
- Laura Prepon (b. 1980; left 2016) Actress.
- Lisa Marie Presley (1968–2023; left 2014) Singer and songwriter who was the daughter of Elvis Presley.
- Priscilla Presley (b. 1945; left 2017) Businesswoman and actress.

R

- Mark Rathbun (b. 1957; left 2004) Whistleblower, and critic of the Church. In December 2018, Jezebel reported that Rathbun had posted videos on his website that praised Scientology and criticized ex-Scientologist Leah Remini. Jezebel also suggested that Rathbun had actually re-joined Scientology.
- Joe Reaiche (1958–2024; left 2005) Former rugby league footballer who was the father of Alanna Masterson and Jordan Masterson. He accused the church of framing him for financial misconduct and was estranged from his children at the time of his death.
- Leah Remini (b. 1970; left 2013) Actress and critic of the church. She wrote an autobiography in 2015 entitled Troublemaker: Surviving Hollywood and Scientology, and produces and presents the A&E documentary series Leah Remini: Scientology and the Aftermath.
- Mike Rinder (1955–2025; left 2007) Whistleblower and critic of the church.
- Mimi Rogers (b. 1956) Actress. Ex-wife of Tom Cruise.

S

- Amy Scobee (left 2005) Whistleblower and critic of the church.
- Chris Shelton (b. 1969; left 2012) Author and YouTuber; he was a member of the church for 27 years and has been outspoken about his experiences since leaving.
- Aaron Saxton (b. 1974; left 2006) Former Sea Org member who had influential positions in Sydney as well as the United States. He received attention when Australian Senator Nick Xenophon quoted statements by Saxton about Scientology into the parliamentary record of the Australian Senate.
- Reed Slatkin (1949–2015) Sentenced in 2003 to 14 years in prison for running one of the largest Ponzi schemes in US history, scamming more than $600 million from 800 investors.
- Ingo Swann (1933–2013) American remote viewing pioneer.

T

- Jeffrey Tambor (b. 1944; left 2000s) Actor, left when he was pressured to leave his second wife.
- Paul Twitchell (1908–1971; left 1959) Spiritual writer and founder of Eckankar. Joined Scientology and achieved the status of "Clear".

V

- Mona Vasquez (1960–2011; left 1989) French painter who went on hunger strike in Paris to be reimbursed by Scientology.
- Aimé Venel (b. 1950), French painter and drawer.
- Joy Villa (b. 1986; left 2025) Singer-songwriter, actress. Got into Scientology in 2011 at the age of 23, became a staff member, joined the Sea Org, became an auditor, and went Clear. Villa said that during her time in Scientology she recruited hundreds of people into it. In 2025 she announced she was writing her memoir, From Scientology to Christ: The Escape They Never Wanted Me to Make.
- Cyril Vosper (1935–2004; left 1968) Author and deprogrammer; wrote The Mind Benders which was the first book on Scientology to be written by an ex-member and the first critical book on Scientology to be published.

W

- Matt Willis (b. 1983; left 2008) Musician, singer, songwriter, television presenter and actor, and bassist and co-vocalist of the pop band, Busted. Was recruited to the church following a stint in rehab, but left the church after they reportedly advised that he separate from his wife Emma Willis, who the church deemed to be a "suppressive person".
- Lawrence Wollersheim (left 1979) Former member and co-founder of the FACTNet, a non-profit organization that criticized the church, known for winning a multi-million dollar judgment against the church in a case about publishing material on the internet that the church claimed was protected by copyright.
- Bonnie Woods (left 1982) Former member of the Sea Org who was subjected to a smear campaign by the church.

Y

- Robert Vaughn Young (1938–2003; left 1989) Former Scientology spokesperson who became a Church critic and expert witness.

== See also ==
- Scientology and celebrities
- Scientology officials
- International Association of Scientologists
