= Chris Shelton =

Chris Shelton may refer to:

- Chris Shelton (author)
- Chris Shelton (baseball)
- Chris Shelton (unionist), American labor union leader
- Chris Shelton, developer of the Nascom computer
