= Elysian Masonic Temple =

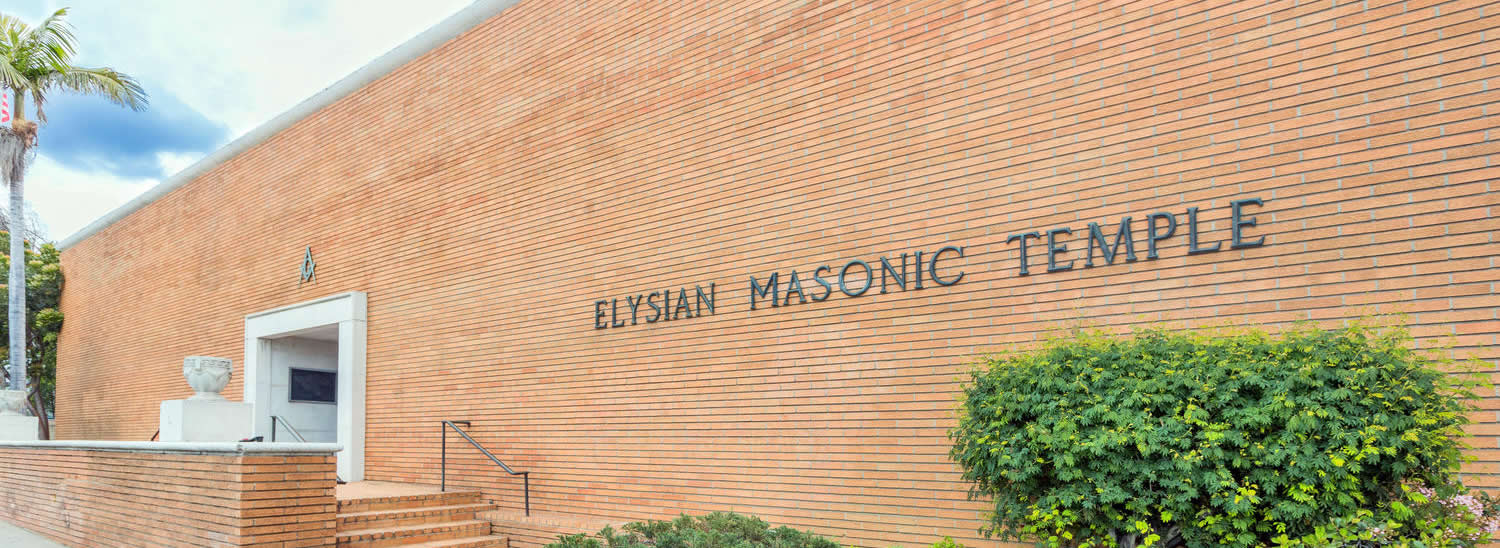
- Interactive map of the Elysian Masonic Temple area

General information
- Architectural style: To Be Added
- Location: 1900 N. Vermont Ave., Los Angeles, California
- Coordinates: 34°06′21.6″N 118°17′29.2″W
- Completed: 1959

Design and construction
- Architects: TBD; TBD

Elysian Masonic Temple is a Masonic Temple in Los Angeles, California, which was built in 1958.

== History ==
During the early years of the 1950s a frequent topic of conversation among Elysian Lodge #418 members was the need for more spacious and modern accommodations necessary to advance and support the rapidly growing and expanding Freemason Lodge.

Discussions focused on three alternatives as potential solutions to these concerns.

- First, Reconstruction and expansion of Elysian's current Echo Park property.
- Second, Construct a new Income-type building (Lodge facilities and Commercial rentals) at another location.
- Third, Construct a new Non Commercial-type building (Lodge facilities only) also at an alternate location.

=== Building committee ===
On May 6, 1953, a committee was appointed to explore the possibility and feasibility of each alternative and report their findings to the Lodge. Based on the report presented, a decision was made to move forward with the Third alternative, purchase property at an alternate location and construct a “New Elysian Masonic Temple” thereon.

Resulting from the efforts of Elysian Past Masters Henry Coley and John Filbert a site in the Los Feliz area of Los Angeles was located and arrangements were made for its consideration by the Lodge. A favorable vote was received from the Elysian membership and the Lodge purchased the land whereupon the present building now stands.

The new property had a frontage of 212 feet on North Vermont Avenue, a depth of 182 feet on Franklin Avenue and 185 feet on Welch Place thus having streets on three sides. Ample space was available to also provide a Parking lot with adequate capacity for the Lodge. Elysian Lodge had now made a commitment to proceed with the design and the task of constructing the proposed Project that would provide the new home of Elysian Lodge #418.

=== Ground breaking ===
November 7, 1957 A formal ceremony was conducted on site to celebrate the actual beginning of construction. The 1957 Lodge Master G. Basil Bates, 33rd Degree, presided over the event. It was recorded in the Minutes of the event, “The problems of design for beauty, utility and spaciousness were many, but were worked out with a patience and zeal that were not to be denied.” The anticipation and excitement of beginning construction had become a reality for Elysian Lodge and its entire Membership".

=== Cornerstone laying ===
April 5, 1958 The ceremony of Laying the Cornerstone for the new building was conducted during the term of the 1958 Lodge Master, Kenneth E. Hill. The Cornerstone was laid by Most Worshipful Leo V. Anderson, Grand Master of Masons in the State of California under the auspices of the Grand Lodge and in Full Form. A time capsule was placed within the wall behind the Cornerstone and remains unopened and undisturbed to this day.

During the many months of construction several Elysian Masons gave of their time and effort supplementing the work of the General Contractor and various Specialty Subcontractors. For instance, Past Master Arthur E. Gray, Master in 1940 and a Plumbing Contractor provided the Plumbing installation for the project. For a period of over thirty months, Past Masters John Filbert (1932 Master) and Henry Coley (1935 Master) gave their Full time to the overall, day to day supervision of the entire project ensuring its successful completion.

=== Dedication ===
January 10, 1959 The formal Dedication of the New Elysian Masonic Temple was performed by Most Worshipful Phil N. Myers, Grand Master of Masons in the State of California under the auspices of the Grand Lodge, with full representation of the Grand Lodge and in Full Form. The Ceremony was conducted during the term of Arthur L. Holt, Master of Elysian Lodge in 1959.

Historical Photographs of both the Cornerstone and Dedication Ceremonies performed by Grand Lodge are proudly displayed on the wall of Elysian's Conference / Historical room.

The total cost of the Land, Building, Equipment and Furnishings was $245,500. Many of Elysian's members contributed personally and substantially toward the purchase of the new building's Equipment and Furnishings.

On November 6, 1958, Elysian's entire property at the Sunset and Echo Park location was sold for $138,000. On May 3, 1962, the Trust deed payable to Elysian Masonic Temple Assn. by the purchaser of the property was paid in full. The entire proceeds were applied to Elysian's indebtedness still owed on the New property and Improvements leaving an unpaid balance of $16,000.

By late 1964 Elysian's entire debt on the new Temple was paid off. An appropriate “Mortgage Burning Ceremony” was conducted on April 1, 1965, in the new Banquet/Dining room as a celebration by the Membership of having achieved the goal of constructing a new Masonic Temple for Elysian Lodge and its members for many years and generations into the future.

The ceremony was conducted by the 1965 Lodge Master, William L. Urban. Honored guests attending were Brother Mark A. Green, Chairman of the Grand Lodge Committee on Lodge Finance and Myron E. Smith, Deputy Grand Master.

The evening program included an outline of Elysian's Financial history presented by Lodge Secretary, Harold C. Johns, an account of Elysian Masonic Temple Association accomplishments by Past Master Harry Templeton and Junior Past Master Henry A. Taylor concluded with a report on the manner in which Elysian's mortgage was paid off during his year as Master in 1964.

Written in Lodge records at the time............ Our ancient brethren were both operative and speculative Masons. So are we.The ancient custom of temple building has not become obsolete in Elysian and the spirit of its brethren is such that while acquiring, magnifying and making secure the earthly tabernacle they find in it a constant symbolism in allusion to “that spiritual building, that house not made with hands, eternal in the heavens.”

== The Elysian Masonic Temple Association ==
Founded in 1912, Incorporated in 1914, The Elysian Masonic Temple Association has operated continuously through the present day as an integral part of Elysian Lodge No. 418 F&AM.

Consisting of a Board of Directors composed exclusively of members of Elysian Lodge it was organized for the sole purpose of administering and managing all Business affairs of Elysian Masonic Temple. First at the Lodge's original building at Sunset Blvd. and Echo Park Ave. until 1960 and now continuing to the current Los Feliz location 111 years later.

The concept of owning and operating their own “Home” for Elysian Lodge was an original goal of the Lodge Founders and has been successfully continued by each successive generation of Elysian's membership.

Beside conducting the daily business of Elysian Temple, managing the Financial aspect of the Board's responsibilities is of Prime importance especially when considering the costs involved in the operation of the Building and Facilities. Expenses such as Taxes, Insurances, Utilities, Maintenance and Repairs, etc. are substantial and require continuous effort to generate and maintain an adequate Cash Flow from the operation of the building's operations. This must cover not only current overhead and operating expenses but also provide the resources necessary to provide resources for a secure and successful future.

At the original Echo Park Building the process of generating revenue from its operations was rather straight forward as the original design of the two story building dedicated the entire first floor to Commercial store rentals. Elysian Lodge was the only organization occupying the building with all Lodge facilities located on the second floor.

A different concept for generating revenue at the new Los Feliz building was envisioned at the time the building was designed and the property developed.

Revenue was to be derived from rental of the building and facilities to a variety of Masonic Organizations. Also, to non-Masonic groups as well to conduct their meetings and events.

== Past tenants ==
Masonic Lodges

- Arabic No. 763
- Golden Gavel No. 445
- Silver Trowel No. 42
- Henry S. Orem No. 458

Eastern Star Chapters

- Elysian No.354
- Hollywood No. 209
- Los Feliz No. 216
- Polaris No. 454
- South Gate No. 192
- United
- Olivete
- Elizabeth B. Wheeler

Miscellaneous Organizations

- Daughters of the Nile
- White Shrine No. 71
- Beauceant Assembly No.42
- Khaba Court No. 40 - L.O.S.N.A
- Los Angeles / Trojan Shrine Club

Youth Orders

- Alexander G. Cochran Chapter - Order of DeMolay
- Bethel No.11 - International Order of Jobs Daughters

Non Masonic Organizations

- Los Feliz Women's Club
- Los Feliz Republican Women's Club
- University Club of Los Angeles
- Los Angeles Garden Club
- Floral Arts Group - LAGC
- Viennese 200 Dance Club
- Bulgarian - American Club
- Orden Rosacruz AMORC
- Hollywood Comedy Club
- Beverly Hills Playhouse
- County of Los Angeles Election Board
