= Allen Barton =

American musician

Allen Barton (born May 18, 1968) is an American playwright, director, acting teacher, and classical pianist. He is known primarily for his longtime association with the Beverly Hills Playhouse, a Los Angeles–based acting school.

== Biography ==
Allen Barton grew up in Lexington, Massachusetts along with several siblings. In 1990, he graduated from Harvard University with a degree in Russian and Soviet Studies. His older brother, Fred Barton, is a New York–based pianist and composer. His father, David K. Barton, was a radar-systems engineer. His cousin was jazz saxophonist Paul Desmond.

== Career ==
=== Beverly Hills Playhouse ===
After university, Barton relocated to Los Angeles and began his studies as an actor at the Beverly Hills Playhouse (BHP). Over the next 18 years, he completed apprenticeships as a director and teacher under Milton Katselas, BHP's founder. He began working part-time for BHP in 1993, became CFO in 1997 and then CEO in 2003. He began teaching for BHP in 2002. Katselas died in October 2008, bequeathing ownership of BHP to Barton. Barton has continued to teach at the school and oversees its operations.

=== Playwright ===
Barton's first play Engagement was produced by the Skylight Theatre Company in Los Angeles in 2010, and was mounted as well in San Francisco in 2014. His second play was Years to the Day (2013). It was nominated in writing and acting categories by the LA Drama Critics Circle and the LA Weekly, and was one of the latter's Ten Best Plays of 2013. It was performed in Paris in October 2013, and also participated in the 59E59 Theaters' "East To Edinburgh" Festival in June 2014 on its way to a run at the 2014 Edinburgh Theatre Festival. Barton's third play is Disconnection (2015).

=== Directing ===
As a director, Barton has helmed the following Los Angeles stage productions: About Faith (2001), I Make you Laughing (2004), Pink Dot (2005), Burn This (2006), The Last Five Years (2007), Rabbit Hole (2008), The Real Thing (2009), Engagement (2010), and Project X presentations of The Heidi Chronicles (2012), Oleanna (2013), Speed-the-Plow (2014), and Gruesome Playground Injuries 2016).

== Scientology ==
Barton was an active Scientologist for about seven years in the 1990s, and acted in many of the Church of Scientology's in-house films under the Golden Era Productions label. He started to lose interest in 2001 when Scientology became more "militant" and their disconnection policy targeted Milton Katselas and the Beverly Hills Playhouse, impacting its business.

After Lawrence Wright interviewed him in 2012 for the book Going Clear: Scientology, Hollywood, and the Prison of Belief, Barton was declared a suppressive person. The Church of Scientology ordered any remaining acting students that were Scientologists to quit the Playhouse, and forbade Barton's elderly and "cherished" piano teacher Mario Feninger from even speaking to him.

Barton went on to write and produce the play Disconnection, modeled on the Scientology policy of disconnection which he says is a "mistreatment of its own adherents and its policy of enforced separation of members from any friends or family who try to challenge its authority or credibility".

== Personal life ==
Barton married Tiffany Yu in 2003, and they have three children.
