= Mona Vasquez =

French ex-Scientologist and painter

- Born: 1960; France
- Died: 2 September 2011 (aged 50–51)
- Occupations: French author, anti-cultist
- Website: mona.ateliere.free.fr

Mona Vasquez (1960 – 2 September 2011) was a Scientologist who was active in Scientology's headquarters in Europe, in Copenhagen, in the 1980s. She went on a hunger strike in August 1989 at Scientology's offices in Paris when she wanted to quit the program, and have her money returned; she received almost €60,000.

Mona was a painter, and established artist and poet. She has written an autobiography in which she recounts her experiences with Scientology, "Et Satan créa la Secte, Mémoires d’une rescapée".

== Experiences with Scientology ==
Vasquez says she was initially introduced to Scientology by reading a friend's books. There, she says, she became part of an organisation under "tight control... from the mother church". She says she attempted to leave three times in this period, always coming back. After being convicted of making illegal loans, which she argued had been encouraged by Scientology, she was set free from jail on the condition that she not attempt to contact members of the Scientology organisation. She finally rejected Scientology. With money tight, she sought the return of money she had paid to Scientology for books and training courses. After a ten-day hunger strike in Paris in August 1989 covered by Antenne 2, the Scientology organization returned around ₣100,000 of her money to her.

Since then, she has testified before the Parliamentary Commission on Cults in France, and continued to paint and write.

She died on 2 September 2011.

== Publications ==
- Satan Created the Cult: Memoirs of an escapee, La Secte: Et Satan créa la secte: Mémoires d'une rescapée, Mona Vasquez, March 2006
- La secte : Comment je m'en suis sortie, Mona Teulière (foreword by Jean Blum), (ISBN 978-2846590501)
