= Philip Gale =

American software developer (1978–1998)

- Born: 1978; Los Angeles, California
- Died: March 13, 1998; Cambridge, Massachusetts
- Occupations: College student Internet software developer
- Known for: Total Access; EarthLink

Philip Chandler Gale (1978 – March 13, 1998) was an American Internet software developer and sophomore student at the Massachusetts Institute of Technology (MIT). He was notable for having written Total Access while at MIT, and was hired by EarthLink at the age of 16 to work on its development. By the age of 17, Gale had earned roughly a million dollars' worth of stock options at EarthLink for his ISP programs.

In 1995, Gale's father died from a heart attack, and friends said Gale struggled to come to terms with the loss. He returned to MIT in 1996 and became a music major. On March 13, 1998, Gale jumped to his death from a classroom on the 15th floor of a building on the MIT campus.

== Early life and education ==
Philip Chandler Gale was the eldest child of Marie and David Gale. He had a younger sister Elizabeth. His parents and many of his immediate family were deeply committed to the Church of Scientology. His mother Marie had been in the church from the age of 12, and her parents and grandparents were also believers. Philip's father was a software engineer, and in 1981 had founded RealWorld, a supplier of accounting software.

The family moved from Los Angeles to New Hampshire when Philip was young, and he showed "an early aptitude for numbers and machines". Seeing his abilities, Marie taught him at home with another mother, and said that before the age of five, he was reading and doing math at the second and third-grade level. Later they lived in Clearwater, Florida; Charlotte, North Carolina; Utah; and Oregon.

From the age of 8, Gale lived and studied at The Delphian School in Sheridan, Oregon, a private boarding school based on L. Ron Hubbard's ideas. Philip's parents personally knew the founders of the school. He graduated from there at age 14. At that time, his family had moved to Utah. Gale got a job in programming at the marketing firm where his father worked, but he had contentious relations with fellow workers, as he could outperform many older programmers and had a tendency to treat people who were not as intelligent as he with contempt.

== College and EarthLink ==
Gale was admitted to MIT at the age of 15 in 1993. He initially pursued studies in physics and engineering. In addition to his ability in programming, he was a talented musician. At MIT, he joined the Phi Sigma Kappa fraternity as a freshman in late 1994.

At 16, Gale wrote a software program called "Total Access", to increase usage of Internet service providers (ISP). He was hired by EarthLink over Christmas break his first year as a student, and took a 3-semester sabbatical from MIT to work at the company, which had been founded by Sky Dayton, a Scientology member and fellow Delphian School alumnus. As director of research and development, Gale developed his program to increase the ability of the company's internet servers to connect customers to the Internet, giving the firm a competitive advantage that helped it ascend to the top ranks among ISPs. It eventually acquired one million customers and a market share worth $2 billion.

His father died from a heart attack in 1995 when Gale was 17. Friends and family said that Gale was profoundly affected by the loss of his father. A year later, he seemed to be struggling with real grief and trying to come to terms with it.

Before his 17th birthday he declared legal emancipation, which allowed him to exercise stock options worth about a million dollars at EarthLink, which was about to go public.

== Return to MIT ==
Gale returned to MIT in 1996. In fall of 1997, he switched from physics to the humanities, becoming a music major and surprising some of his friends. He performed with a chorus and Balinese-style percussion orchestra. With a friend, Gale formed a rock band and played drums.

In late 1997 he took a course in Musical Aesthetics and Media Technology with MIT Media Laboratory professor Tod Machover. Machover later said that Gale was "a quiet, serious, unusual, talented and brilliant young man". As an example, Machover said that a week before his death, Gale returned with a proposal for a complex project, having gone in his own direction after some of their preliminary discussions. He proposed to develop a way to analyze diverse sounds, among them crowd noises, nature sounds, and machines clanging, permitting them to be organized and associated according to rhythmic, loudness, and coloristic similarities. "The idea was great, and very much in line with some of the more ambitious hopes that our group has for the future of music", Machover commented. Gale acquired an expensive new digital recorder to work on this project.

Also in the fall of 1997, Gale moved out of the fraternity house and room which he had shared with his friend Eric Hu, and into an apartment in Central Square with two other students. Hu later said that Gale had mentioned suicide in the weeks before his death, complaining about being bored and depressed, and feeling that his state would not change. Gale had a relationship for months with Christine Hrul, a student at Wellesley College, but he had abruptly broken off their relationship in February 1998. About that time, he wrote an email to an old friend saying he was depressed and thought about suicide. Friends said he had mostly stopped going to class and wasn't eating well.

== Death ==
For weeks, Gale had been asking classmates how to get access to the roof of MIT's tallest structure, the Cecil and Ida Green Building, which is occupied by the Earth, Atmospheric, and Planetary Sciences Department. On March 13, 1998, at about 7:30 pm in an empty classroom on the 15th floor of the Green Building, Gale brought his portable digital recorder, which he switched on. Gale then wrote and drew the following on the blackboard: Isaac Newton's equation for how an object accelerates as it falls, along with a sketch of a stick figure tossing a chair. He signed it, "Phil was here", picked up a chair and hurled it through the heavy plate glass window. Witnesses said that he cleared the glass shards away, and then jumped out the window.

Eric Plosky, a student at MIT, was inside an adjacent dorm watching television at the time of Gale's death, and heard a crashing sound. Plosky recounted to National Public Radio, "The windows of the building were sealed. So he actually had to throw a chair out the window to break it so that he could jump through. The noise that we heard was that chair hitting the ground. Some of the people in my dorm actually looked out the window in time to see him fall."

"It was typical Phil. It's so like him to have planned a show", said his former girlfriend Christine Hrul, "He was so careful with things in his life, so methodical". Students reported hearing the sound of breaking glass, then a splintering sound, and last a scream. Gale was taken to the hospital, where he was pronounced dead at 8:05 pm.

Police released part of Gale's suicide note, which was found at his apartment:

Presumably I have jumped from a tall building. Yes, it is odd. To tell you why would be to tell you my mind! I cannot do this. I am not crazy, albeit driven to suicide. "It is not about any single event, or person. It is about stubborn sadness, and a detached view of the world. I see my life — so much dreary, mundane, wasted time wishing upon unattainable goals — and I feel little attachment to the future. But it is not so bad, relatively. I exaggerate. "In the end, it is that I am unwilling (sick of living) to live in mediocrity. And this is what I have chosen to do about it. "The saddest part is the inevitable guilt and sorrow I will force on my family and friends. But there is not much I can say. I am sorry. Try to understand that this is about me and my 'fuked up ideas.' It is not because I was raised poorly or not cared for enough. It just is. "Please give my $ to my family and my gizmos to people who will use them. — and no fuking suing! "I am scared of the fall. I am scared of the impact. But when it is through, it will be through. "take care world, Philip"

Gale closed his handwritten suicide note with a smiley face and the words "And stay happy!"

After an investigation and an autopsy by Cambridge police, Gale's death at the age of nineteen, late on the evening of March 13, 1998, was ruled a suicide.

A memorial service was held at the MIT Chapel on March 19. His body was cremated in Boston and his ashes were shipped to his mother for a private ceremony. Gale was survived by his mother and a sister.

== Media coverage and Scientology ==
Gale was raised a Scientologist, but at the time of his death he had distanced himself from its practices. Gale was said to have fully abandoned his Scientology beliefs while at EarthLink. A close friend at EarthLink, Brian Ladner, said that: "Leaving Scientology was a traumatic experience. He was brought up thinking it was the only way." Ladner says while they worked together, he introduced Gale to Church of the SubGenius, which specializes in debunking cults and has developed its own cult following. During that period, Ladner reported that Gale hung a poster of J. R. "Bob" Dobbs, SubGenius' fictional spiritual leader, on his office door. According to Ladner, the pair of young men had also done a lot of partying in Los Angeles, and worked for a time on a "pornographic Web site hosted by EarthLink".

Shortly after Gale's death, speculation on campus, in the media, and on the Internet newsgroup alt.religion.scientology arose. Questions arose about the role his Scientology background may have played in his suicide, particularly because he died on the day that adherents celebrate founder L. Ron Hubbard's birthday. Gale had been in contact with a reporter for the Boston Herald and had been interviewed as part of a scathing 5-part series titled "Scientology Unmasked", published March 1 through 5, 1998, just days before his suicide by Joseph Mallia. Though Gale was not named in the special report for which he had been interviewed, Mallia also wrote an article about his death shortly thereafter.

Matthew Munsey, an MIT student who witnessed Gale's suicide, created a website called "Who is Philip Gale?" in an effort to make sense of the incident. He stated: "Since this tragedy, I have thought a great deal about Philip and what he was trying to say. These questions need to be answered. Meanwhile, I will collect information here." This site included some personal notes from friends and photos, until it was taken down; it can only be accessed by web archival machines.

Others who spoke publicly dismissed the idea that Scientology was significant in his suicide. Lauren McLeod, a reporter with the Concord Journal and friend of Gale's, said that he had been struggling to deal with lasting grief following his father's sudden death from a heart attack in October 1995. His friend Eric Hu said that Gale had complained of being depressed and bored. Another friend from EarthLink had received an email expressing his discontent about a week before his death.

In November 1999 a fellow MIT student, Matthew Herper, published an article reflecting on several student deaths, including Gale's suicide.

People magazine featured Gale's story in a 2001 series of articles on suicides at MIT, describing him as a music major "so prodigiously bright that he counted few of his much older peers as intellectual equals". His mother and sister were interviewed and photographed for the article. Though it touched on Gale's Scientology upbringing, it mostly focused on the high suicide rate at MIT and student access to health care on campus.

In August 2001, the National Public Radio program All Things Considered noted that, in the wake of Gale's death, MIT had investigated how to deal with issues of student suicides. The student Eric Plosky commented to NPR: "In many ways, suicide has been looked on as something that's just part and parcel of life at the Institute. That ingrained thinking historically, I think, has prevented administrators from looking at suicide as a problem to which there might be some reasonable response."

The investigative report released by MIT identified deficiencies within its mental health program. Between 1995 and 2015, the rate of suicides among MIT undergraduate students was 50% higher than the national average for college students, and slightly higher than comparable figures at nearby Harvard University. In a 2015 interview, MIT Chancellor Cynthia Barnhart acknowledged that the numbers were of concern, but had improved since the early 2000s.

== See also ==
- List of suicides (A–M)
