= The Complex: An Insider Exposes the Covert World of the Church of Scientology =

2008 book by John Duignan

The Complex
- Cover
- Author: John Duignan, with Nicola Tallant
- Language: English
- Subject: Church of Scientology
- Publisher: Merlin Publishing
- Publication date: October 7, 2008
- Publication place: Ireland
- Media type: Print (paperback)
- Pages: 318
- ISBN: 978-1-903582-84-8
- Dewey Decimal: 299/.936 22
- LC Class: BP605.S2 D85 2008

The Complex: An Insider Exposes the Covert World of the Church of Scientology is a non-fiction book about the organization and practices of the Church of Scientology, written by former Scientologist John Duignan with Nicola Tallant. The book was published in Ireland on October 7, 2008, by Merlin Publishing. Both of Duignan's parents died when he was very young and as a result he had difficult experiences as a teenager. He met an attractive female Scientologist on the streets of Germany, who convinced him to take a free personality test from Scientology. After the test, he was told he had a result of "Urgent Action Required", and he began to take Scientology courses. Duignan was recruited into Scientology's elite paramilitary organization called the Sea Org, and spent a total of 22 years in the organization. After attending an event where actor and Scientologist Tom Cruise was given a medal and described by church leader David Miscavige as "the most dedicated Scientologist I know", Duignan began to examine the organization more closely and had doubts about remaining. He left the organization in 2006, after taking measures to avoid investigation by Scientology's intelligence agency the Office of Special Affairs.

The Church of Scientology has responded to the publication of The Complex by sending legal letters to several bookstore retailers that were selling the book, claiming the book contains libelous statements about a member of the organization. Merlin Publishing "emphatically denied" these allegations, and an editorial director at the publishing company called Scientology's claim "vexatious". The United Kingdom branch of Amazon.com, Amazon.co.uk, stopped selling copies of the book after receiving legal letters from the Church of Scientology; booksellers Waterstone's and W H Smith also received the legal letter, and Borders Books may have also been "warned off" selling the book. A representative for Amazon.com in the United States said that the US branch of the company will be selling copies of the book, but is "awaiting arrival of the inventory" to their networks.

== John Duignan ==
Both of Duignan's parents died when he was very young, and he and his brother were sent to live with his aunt and her husband. As a result of these childhood experiences he had a difficult time as a teenager and felt like an outsider. He lived in County Cork from age 11 to 17, and later moved to Germany. Duignan was recruited into Scientology in 1985 at age 22 when an attractive woman on the street in Stuttgart, Germany offered him a free personality test. After the personality test Duignan was told he had a result of "Urgent Action Required". He left his job and his girlfriend to become active in the organization. After spending time learning Scientology techniques, officials from Scientology Missions International in Los Angeles contacted Duignan and asked him to join the organization's elite paramilitary group called the Sea Org. He spent some time training in Los Angeles, and later was posted to the Scientology headquarters at Saint Hill Manor in East Grinstead, West Sussex. Duignan states he received weapons training while in the organization. At one point he was responsible for working on the organization's global finance computer system. While in the organization Duignan and his friends who were also Scientologists felt the organization was not a religion but rather a political movement. Duignan devoted twenty years to the organization, eventually leaving in July 2006.

He began to question his devotion to the organization in 2004, after an encounter with actor and Scientologist Tom Cruise at the annual International Association of Scientologists Gala Ball where Cruise was described as "the most dedicated Scientologist," Duignan felt hurt that he was working for between five and fifteen pounds per week under difficult conditions, but was not seen to be as dedicated to the organization as Cruise. Duignan then began to research Scientology on the Internet, which he had been forbidden to do inside the organization. He told Scientology management officials that he had to leave for a week to visit his dying uncle, in order to get permission to go back to Ireland. He left and later traveled to Dublin and then returned to his native County Cork, where he is studying for an arts degree. He currently regards Scientology as "unlicensed and unmonitored psychotherapy". In an interview on Phantom FM radio, Duignan said that "the readjustment after it has been tremendously difficult".

== Contents ==
Duignan recounts his time in the Scientology organization, and his experiences during his twenty-two years as a Scientologist. He discusses controversial Scientology practices which he refers to as sleep deprivation and brainwashing, and describes his experiences during the Scientology process called "Auditing". He describes Church of Scientology goals called "Clear the Planet" (referring to the Scientology state of "Clear") and "Get Ethics In" (referring to the Scientology ethics and justice system). Duignan also describes the disciplinary organization within the Church of Scientology known as the Rehabilitation Project Force. He comes to believe that there are inherent problems with the organization's management structure, and decides to leave in 2006. Duignan writes that he escaped the Sea Org in 2006, and took steps to avoid investigation and action from Scientology's intelligence agency the Office of Special Affairs.

== Response by the Church of Scientology ==
Scientology spokesman Gerard Ryan spoke with Irish Mail on Sunday prior to the book's publication, and commented on the claims made in the book: "It's absolute baloney. It's all just rubbish. These are just the same old accusations that have been made on the internet and it's all lies." Ryan said he thought Duignan was "associating with fundamentalist Christians and he knows full well that these claims are not true". However, Gerard stated that Scientologists "believe in free speech" and according to the Irish Mail on Sunday Gerard "denied the church would take legal action if false claims were made in the book".

The Complex was available for sale on Amazon.com's United Kingdom branch, Amazon.co.uk, as of October 23, 2008. The Sunday Tribune reported in mid-November that Amazon.co.uk, removed The Complex from its website after the Church of Scientology sent a legal letter to the retailer. In the letter, the Church of Scientology claimed that the book contained libelous statements about a member of the organization. Merlin Publishing has stated that it stands by Duignan and the book. The publishing company "emphatically denied" the allegations made by the Church of Scientology, and Merlin Publishing editorial director Aoife Barrett called Scientology's claim about the book "vexatious". A source at Merlin Publishing told The Sunday Mirror: "It's crazy. These are bully-boy tactics. Their case is weak, and we are going to fight them." Chenile Keogh, a representative for Merlin Publishing, stated in TribuneNews: "We are standing by the book and the author. The book is on sale in Ireland and there is no problem with us publishing in Ireland".

Customers that had previously placed orders for The Complex with Amazon.co.uk were informed that the book is no longer available. Individuals that already ordered the book were sent an email from Amazon.co.uk that The Complex had been "removed from sale for legal reasons". By November 12, 2008, there was no trace of the book's listing on Amazon.co.uk, though the prior entry was visible in a cache of the page on Google. According to The Bookseller, Amazon.co.uk stated: "Unfortunately, we have had to withdraw The Complex by John Duignan in the UK because we received a specific allegation that a passage in the book is defamatory regarding an individual named in the book. In circumstances such as these, UK law gives us no choice but to remove the title from our catalogue." The Church of Scientology also sent the legal letter to other booksellers including Waterstone's and W H Smith. The Bookseller reported that Waterstone's, W H Smith and Borders Books may have been "warned off" selling the book.

The United States branch of Amazon.com responded to a request for comment about the situation from The Register, and stated: "we're awaiting arrival of the inventory into our fulfillment networks. As soon as we get the books in our fulfillment centers, we'll start shipping them out to customers". On November 18, 2008, a query on the German site for Amazon.com for the book resulted in the message "not available". Days prior to the report on the incident by The Register, Tom Cruise attended an Amazon.com employee meeting, and treated the employees to a special screening of his movie Valkyrie, set to be released in December 2008. According to the Swedish news site Realtid.se, John Duignan did not think Cruise was responsible for the legal threats to Amazon.com. Amazon.com spokeswoman Patty Smith commented on the status of the book in a November 16, 2008 article in the Seattle Post-Intelligencer: "We're awaiting shipments of the book into our fulfillment network. Once it arrives, we'll send it out to customers who've ordered it. ... Since the libel laws are different in the U.K., they are not able to sell the book."

== See also ==
- Bibliography of books critical of Scientology
- Scientology controversies
- Scientology and law
