= Aimé Venel =

French painter and drawer (born 1950)

- Born: May 8, 1950; France
- Known for: Painting

Aimé Venel (born May 8, 1950) is a French painter and drawer who focuses on figurative and symbolist style. His style primarily lies between symbolist painting and expressionism art, closely related to romanticism (French:Figuration des temps nouveaux). He is a self-taught man whose artwork is influenced by women's beauty. Venel was a Scientologist for years, before withdrawing from the movement.

== Biography ==
In 1972, Venel was introduced to Pierre Yves Trémois and thereafter he became Edouard Mac’Avoy's student. Between 1974 and 1978, Venel was a part of Mac’Avoy's workshop from where he learned his style and mastered his drawing skills. In 1975, he exhibited first personal collection in Barbizon. Between 1986 and 2000 he worked on a huge triptych (12metre by 3metre) called Pour le chant des oiseaux (For the birds song). This artwork was recognized as the road from the spirituality to materialism passing through the aestheticism to pay tribute to the woman. In 2001 he decorated Villa in Miami with some big paintings including Version Paradis (2mx3,90m), Terre Conquise (2metre by 2,70metre) and Aux sources de la musique (diptych, 2metre by 2,7metre). He also worked on another triptych called Biothèque Evolution (81cmx2m) that reflects the evolution of mankind on earth and pays tribute to scientific research.

== Principal work ==
His principal work is characterized by lyric compositions and some of them are as follows:

- 2011: Les Amours Légendaires II
- 2004/2005: Contes et Légendes (Sleeping Beauty, Bluebeard, Ruy Blas and The Queen of Spain, Isis and Osiris, Le Miracle des Loups, Peter Pan, Le Rouge et le Noir, Amour et Psyché, Notre Dame de Paris
- 1998: La Musique
- 1997: Les Amours légendaires, (Romeo and Juliet, The Beauty and the Beast, Lancelot & Guenièvre, Pierrot & Colombine, Tristan & Iseult, The Minotaur, Hamlet & Ophelia, The Myth of Pygmalion, Orphée & Eurydice
- 1997: Venice and its carnival

== Exhibitions ==
Venel has participated in following exhibitions.

- 2013: Idecor Art Gallery Switzerland, permanent exhibition
- 2012: Exhibition at Hôtel Lotti Paris “ Paris et les Amours Légendaires “
- 2011: Exhibition Galerie 104 L’Atelier du Peintre, Village Suisse, Paris
- 2011: Exhibition Lakind Fine Art, Santa Fé, New Mexico, USA, Hotel NH Atlanta, Bruxelles
- 2010: Exhibition Lakind Fine Art, Santa Fé, New Mexico, USA
- 2010: Exhibition Hôtel Horset Opéra, Paris, France
- 2009: Hôtel Le Lotti, Paris, France «Hommage à René Barjavel»,
- 2009: Hôtel NH Atlanta, Bruxelles, Belgique
- 2008: Hôtel Le Lotti, Paris, France
- 2008: Galerie Saint-Roch, Paris, France
- 2008: Le Colombier de Corvol, Nièvre, France
- 2008: Hôtel NH Atlanta (Bruxelles, Belgique)
- 2008: 4th China (Shenzhen) International Cultural Industries Fair avec la Art64 Gallery
- 2008: Hôtel L’Horset Opéra, Paris, France
- 2008: Atom Space Gallery, Canton, Chine
- 2008: Galerie Princesse de Kiev, Nice, France
- 2008: Art64 Gallery, Canton, Chine
- 2008: Artexpo with la galerie Behr-Thyssen, New-York, USA
- 2007: Galerie Princesse de Kiev, Nice, France
- 2007:Mallorca Art Consulting, Baleares, Espagne
- 2007: Guangzhou International Art Fair avec la Art64 Gallery, Canton, Chine
- 2007: Galerie Arte Um Lugar ao Sol, Curitiba, Brésil
- 2007: Salon de la SNBA (Société Nationale des Beaux-Arts) au Carrousel du Louvre, Paris, France
- 2007: Art en Capital 2007 au Grand Palais, Paris, France
- 2007: Joy Gallery, Key West, Florida, USA
- 2007:Jolly Hotel du Grand Sablon, Bruxelles, Belgique
- 2007: Hôtel L’Horset Opéra, Paris, France
- 2006: Château des Tourelles, Plessis-Trévise, France
- 2006: Jolly Hotel Lotti, Paris, France
- 2005: Guest of Honor at the «83e Salon de Fontenay-le-Fleury», France
- 2005: Hôtel L’Horset Opéra, Paris, France
- 2005: Jolly Hotel Lotti, Paris, France
- 2005: Galerie mouvances, Place des Vosges, Paris, France
- 2004: Galerie Atezart, Avignon, France
- 2004: La Galerie, Luxembourg, Luxembourg
- 2004: Galerie Lacydon, Marseille, France
- 1999: B and R Art Gallery, Californie, USA
- 1999: Galerie Gewehr, Allemagne
- 1999: Galerie du Chêne, Lausanne, Suisse
- 1998: Château de Clermont, Haute-Savoie, France
- 1998: Abbaye de Talloires, Haute-Savoie, France
- 1997: Italian Chamber of Commerce, Paris, France
- 1997: Hôtel Régina, Paris, France
- 1994: Galerie Art Monet, Guatemala
- 1993: Galerie AJL, Paris, France
- 1992: Galerie Marc Estel, Osaka Fu, Japon
- 1992: Galerie Guigné, Paris, France
- 1991: Galerie Sainte-Catherine, Honfleur, France
- 1990: Galerie Art Dépôt, Paris, France
- 1988: Galerie Calisto, Paris, France
- 1988: Société SOMAT, France
- 1987: Hôtel de l’Etrier, Crans-Montana, Suisse
- 1986: Galerie Aimé Venel in Montmartre, Paris, France
- 1986: Société Pernoderie, Créteil, France
- 1986: Garden's Hotel, Lisieux, France
- 1986: Swissair Company, Genève, Suisse
- 1985: Casino de Pornichet, France
- 1984: Galerie du Musée, Paris, France
- 1984: Galerie des Colonies, Nantes, France
- 1983: Galerie Aurélia Antiquités, Milly-la-Forêt, France
- 1982: Galerie l’Oriflamme, Paris, France
- 1981: Galerie Dandoy, Belgique
- 1981: Guest of Honor at la Taverne aux poètes, Angers, France
- 1980: Festival international de Tarascon, France
- 1979: Galerie Michel Perrier, Châteaurenard, France
- 1979: Musée d’Yvoire, Haute-Savoie, France
- 1975: Barbizon, le village des peintres, à la Galerie Present Art, France

== Awards and recognition ==
- 2001: Entry in the Drouot Cotation's dictionary
- 1996: Prix du Maire (Parix Xe)
- 1991: Entry in the book "Prestige de la Peinture et de la Sculpture d'aujourd'hui dans le monde"
- 1989: Entry in the "Who's Who in international Art"
- 1985: Silver Medal by Salon des Artistes Français
- 1981: Honorable Mention by Salon des Artistes Français
