= Death of Yolanda Klug =

German woman found dead after 3 years

Yolanda Klug
- Born: 1995/1996; Steinen, Baden-Württemberg, Germany
- Disappeared: 25 September 2019; Leipzig, Germany
- Status: Missing for 7 years, 1 month and 8 days
- Body discovered: February 25, 2023
- Known for: Mysterious disappearance

Yolanda Klug (born 1995 or 1996) was a German woman who disappeared on 25 September 2019 and whose disappearance had been linked to Scientology. A walker discovered her remains on February 25, 2023 in the forest area Rödel near Freyburg. The cause of death is currently unclear.

== Background ==
Yolanda Klug grew up in Steinen in the county of Lörrach, Baden-Württemberg. Her parents were Annette Margarete Löffler (born 24 August 1966) and Peter Klug, both Scientology members. Löffler held high-ranking positions in the Church of Scientology both in Germany and Switzerland and in 2016 was the press spokesperson for Scientology in Basel. Yolanda had a sister two years younger named Elisa. Yolanda attended Scientology courses but later became attached to the German branch of Zeal Church, a Christian "neo-charismatic free church". She regularly attended Zeal Church Leipzig for about two and a half years prior to her disappearance and had been baptized there.

Klug's parents later separated and Löffler eventually relocated to South Africa with her new life partner and Elisa to work for a local Scientology branch.

According to antiscientologyblog.com Klug's father has been a high-ranking member of Scientology as well and in the 1990s participated in multiple elite courses on the Scientology cruise ship Freewinds. Her sister joined Sea Org and now lives in the United States.

== Disappearance ==
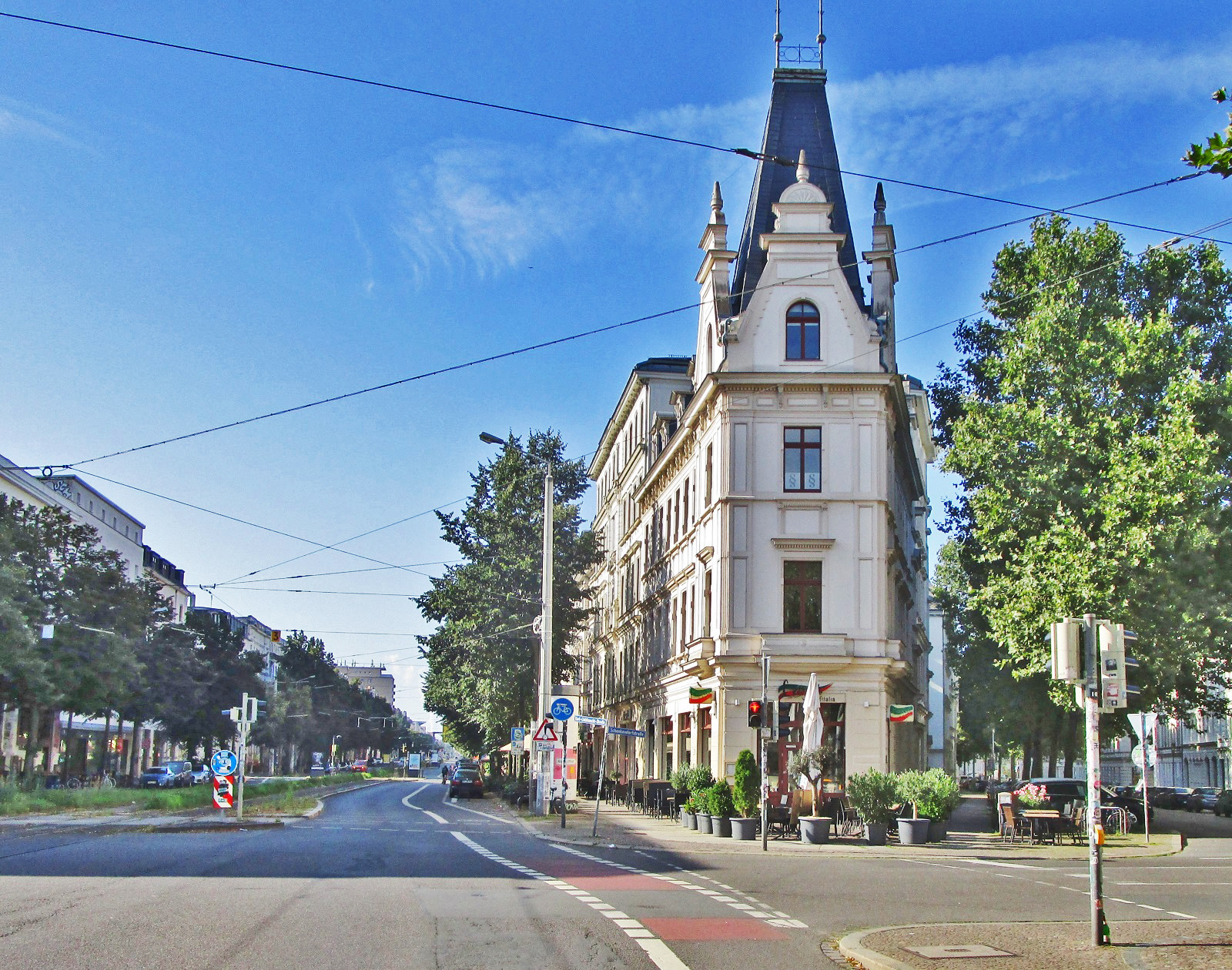
Südplatz in Leipzig where Klug allegedly took the tramway on her way to IKEA

At the time of her disappearance Klug was studying architecture at Leipzig University of Applied Sciences and had gone on a semester abroad to Amman. Five months earlier she had moved into a shared flat on Körnerstraße in Leipzig with another female student. In early September she had spent time in California with her father where she also met with her sister.

On 24 September Klug's father was in Leipzig on a business trip. The two met for dinner. On 25 September Klug was planning to go to the local IKEA store in Günthersdorf. For the same evening she had an appointment with a friend in Halle (Saale) to attend a public movie screening which was part of an event called Herbstsession at the local art school campus. About 3 p.m. Klug left her apartment in Leipzig and likely went to a nearby public transport station. She was last seen at Südplatz and is unaccounted for since then.

According to a friend, one of her teachers from high school tried to contact Klug on Telegram after her disappearance. She never responded but two weeks later the app reported that Klug had been online implying that either Klug or someone else had used her phone at that time.

Klug had booked a plane trip to Jordan including tickets for the journey to the airport prior to her disappearance. However, neither of the tickets were used.

== Investigation ==
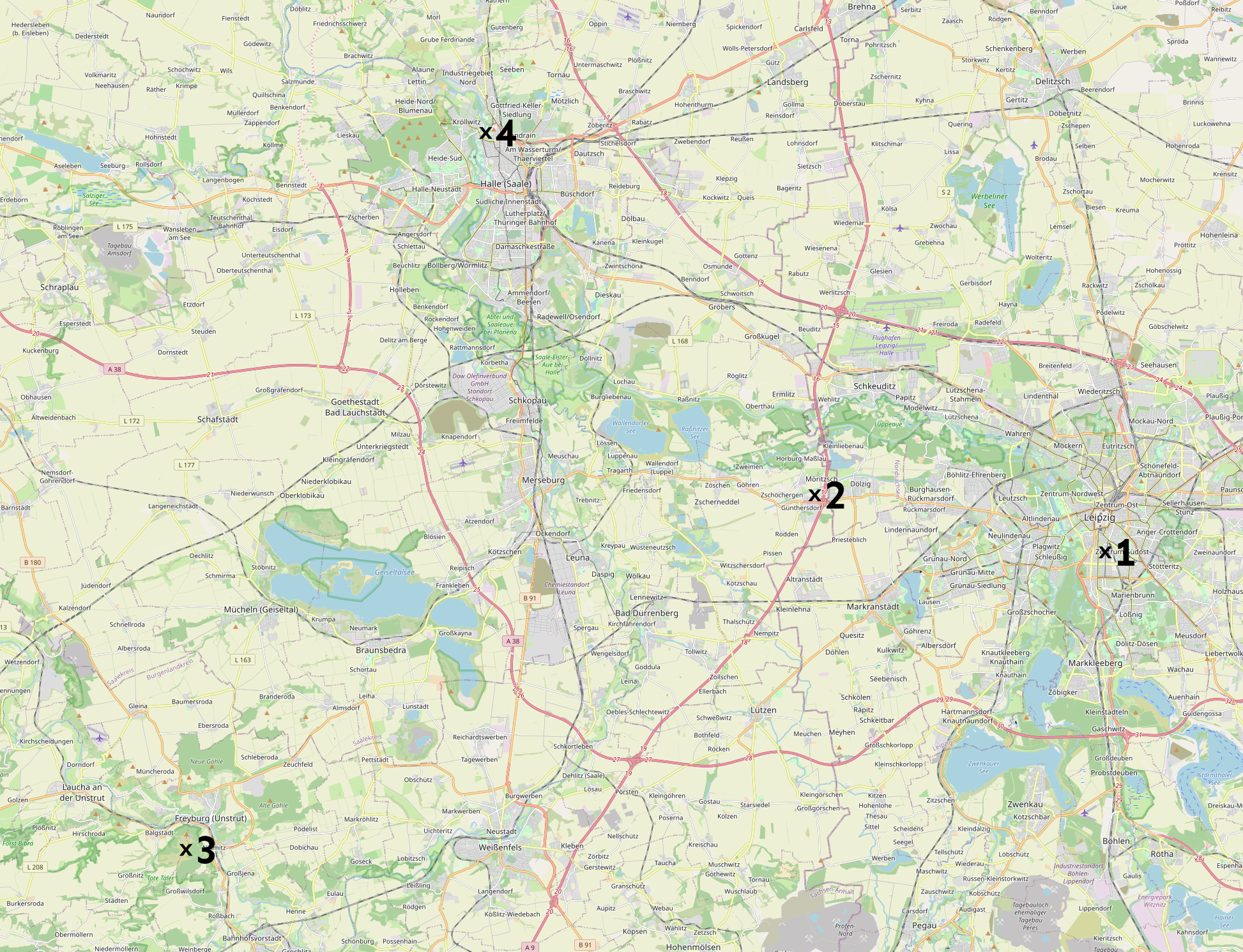
Location map of Klug's disappearance - 1. Klug's apartment in Leipzig; 2. IKEA Günthersdorf; 3. Finding place of Klug's remains; 4. Burg Giebichenstein in Halle

=== Missing person report and first reaction ===
Police were informed about Klug's disappearance the same day and police walked the area around Klug's apartment with a detection dog the same evening. The dog led police to Südplatz where her trail ended, leading to the assumption that she boarded the tramway there. Later, a police helicopter was used in the search.

=== Attempts to reconstruct Klug's final steps ===
Klug suffered from an unspecified condition that sporadically caused her to faint. Therefore one theory brought up during the police investigation was that she had passed out in a place where she would not be found. Since detection dogs were able to register her scent at a bus in Leipzig, at the Günthersdorf IKEA and at the Neuwerk campus of Burg Giebichenstein Kunsthochschule in Halle (where she was supposed to meet her friend later on the day of her disappearance), investigations at first focused on an excavation hole on campus which was sealed the day after her disappearance. In the basement of one of the buildings on the campus a detection dog gave a bark that signaled the smell of a corpse from a newly installed AC that was connected with the excavation hole. However, a survey of the site did not result in any findings. Police used ground-penetrating radar and drilled 33 holes that were then checked using three different detection dogs. About three months after her disappearance divers checked the Mühlgraben, a branch of the river Saale that runs close to Burg Giebichenstein, without results.

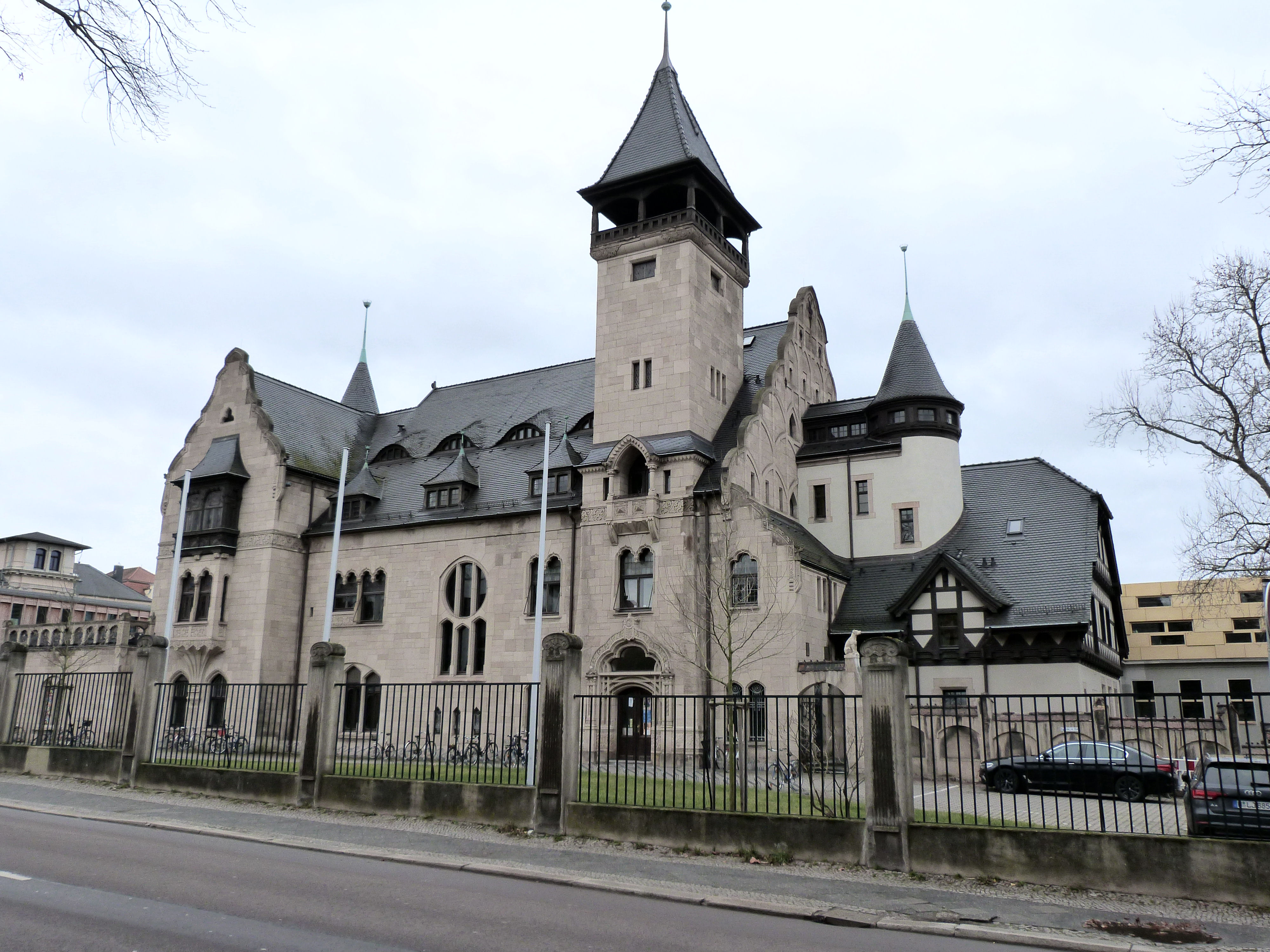
The Neuwerk campus of Burg Giebichenstein Kunsthochschule in Halle where Klug was to meet with her friend on September 25

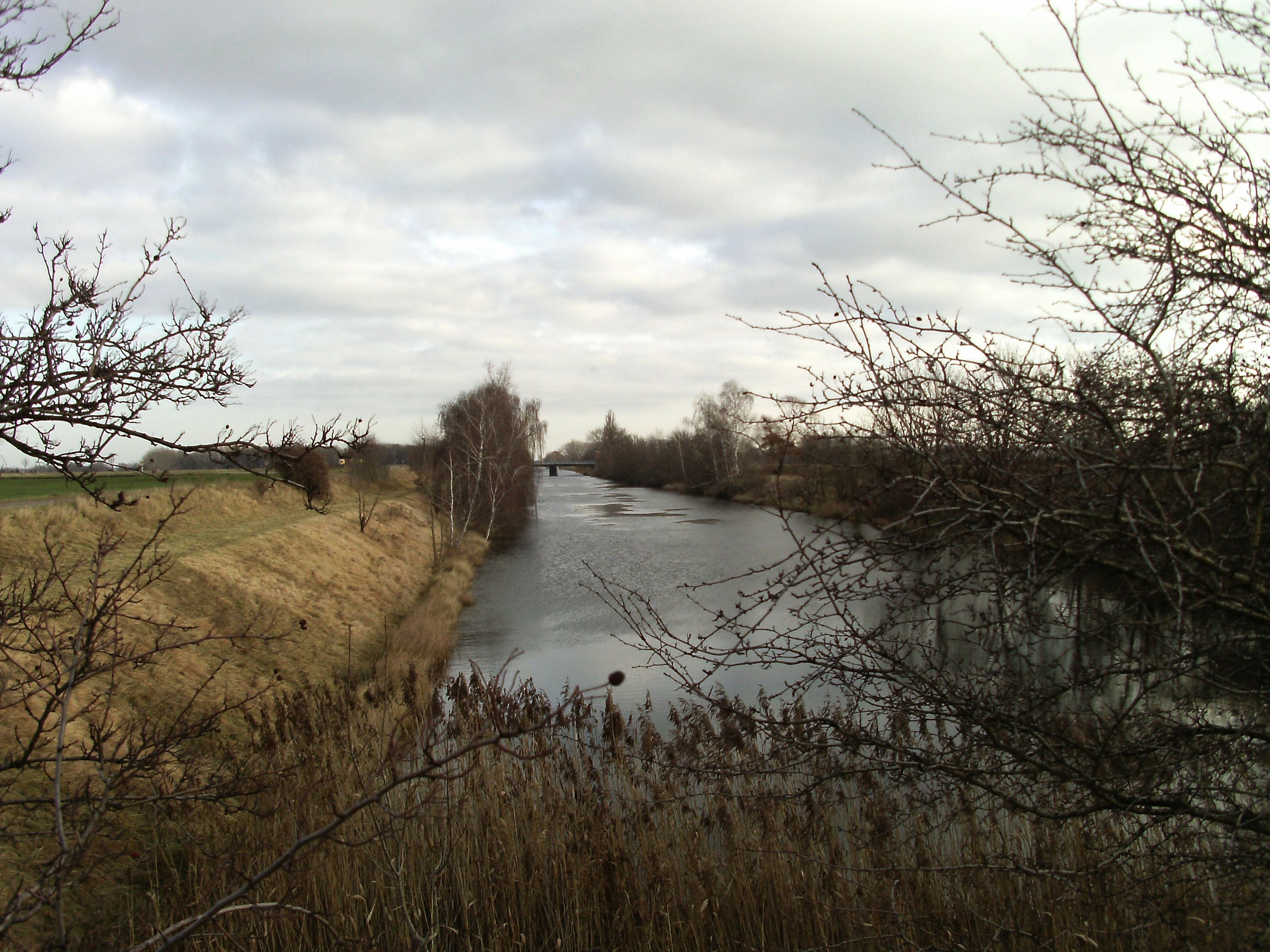
The Saale Elster channel near the IKEA in Günthersdorf

Police also conducted an extensive survey of the surroundings of the IKEA store in Günthersdorf where more than 60 volunteers supported the effort. Three weeks after her disappearance, police divers searched the Saale Elster channel near the IKEA as well as a nearby lake. No evidence was found.

Information about Klug's final steps on the day of her disappearance is restricted to witness reports, as video footage from public transport in Leipzig is automatically deleted after 24 hours and police failed to secure the footage in time. Klug would likely have taken bus line 131 from Leipzig Westplatz to Günthersdorf IKEA. However, according to police the vehicles used on that line are not equipped with video cameras. Footage from IKEA was obtained and analyzed by the police but was inconclusive regarding the question of whether Klug made it to the store. A bus driver on the route from Leipzig to IKEA reported having seen her on the bus.

=== Further theories ===
The possibility that Klug voluntarily disappeared was considered. However, the fact that she left her passport and bank cards at her place made this option very unlikely. There had been no movements on Klug's bank account since her disappearance. At the time Klug had about 8,000 € in her bank account.

Investigations into the possibility that Klug has been victim of a crime have focused on her Scientology background. Police has highlighted the fact that Klug is a close family member of a high-ranking Scientology executive who left the church. Klug's mother and sister are currently unaccounted for as well since police were unable to trace them after their relocation to South Africa. In February 2023 a Scientology spokesperson confirmed on media request that the organization cooperated with the German authorities and had conducted an international internal investigation regarding hints about Klug's whereabouts.

According to her former teacher, Klug had disappeared in 2015 from a tent camp and reappeared a day later, having spent the night alone in the woods. He described Klug as independent-minded and outgoing, and suggested that her disappearance was a consequence of this trait.

=== TV report and extended investigation ===
In July 2022, the case was featured on the German TV program Aktenzeichen XY… ungelöst which reports on unsolved criminal cases. Police are specifically asking for witnesses who saw Klug at Burg Giebichenstein and for pictures and footage from the 2019 Herbstsession event.

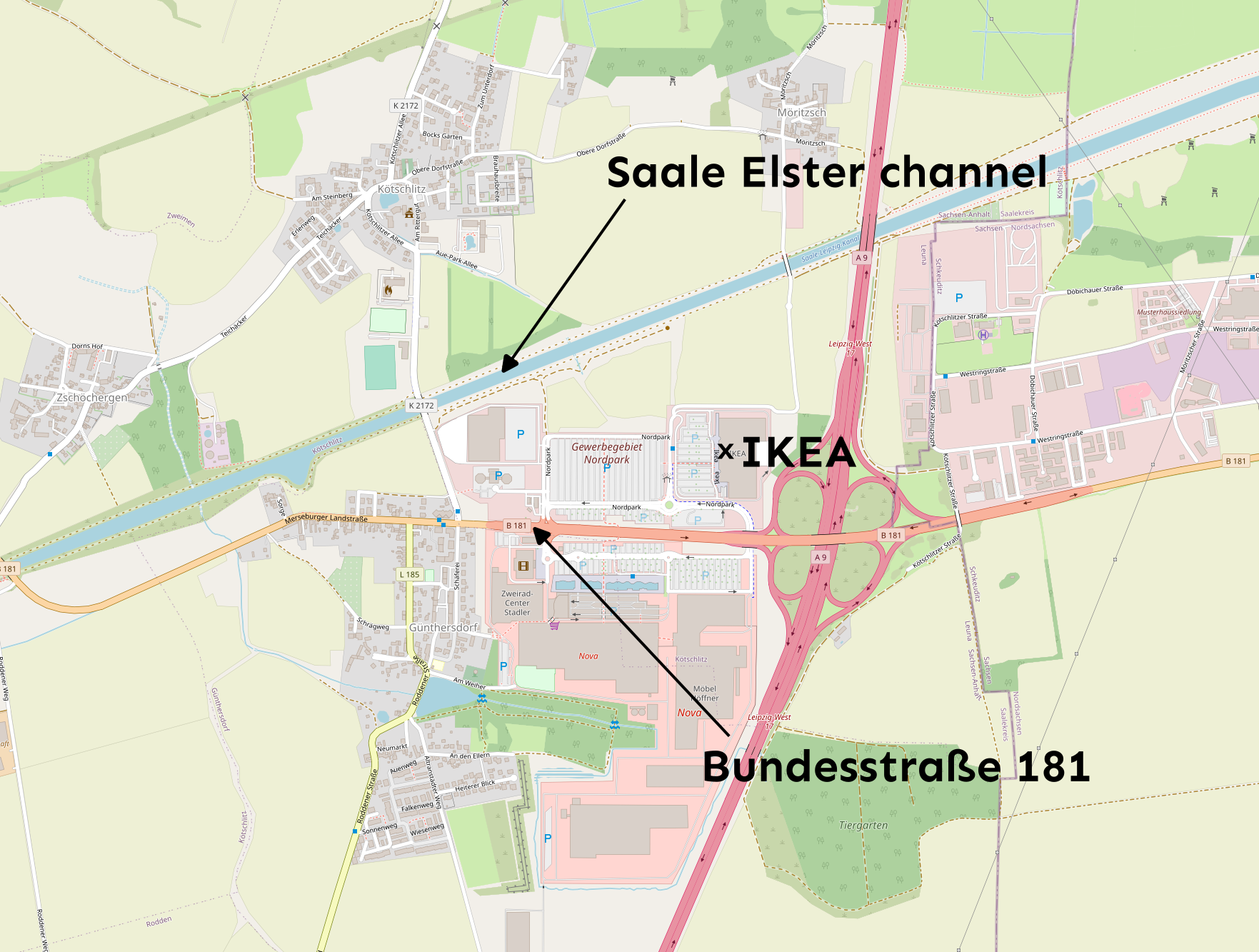
Location map of the Günthersdorf IKEA surroundings

On 16 October 2022 the police published a report on new witnesses who came forward after the broadcast of the Aktenzeichen XY feature. One witness claims to have seen Klug on the day of her disappearance around 3 p.m. at the tram station Richard-Lehmann-Straße/Hochschule für Technik und Wirtschaft, just two stops from Südplatz, talking to a man about visiting IKEA. From there Klug supposedly took the tram in the direction of Connewitz, a nearby district of Leipzig. According to another witness, a truck driver, Klug walked alongside the Saale Elster channel in Günthersdorf, close to the IKEA store, and from there across a bridge in the direction of the road Bundesstraße 181. On a parking lot located between the bridge and the main road she might have stepped into a car with an Esslingen license plate. This prompted renewed speculations in the media regarding the role of Scientology in this case as the German branch of Scientology has one of its main centers in the Esslingen area. According to the police, another witness' testimony suggested a connection to Scientology's European headquarters in Copenhagen.

It is still unclear whether Klug made it to Halle and specifically to the Herbstsession. Only one person who attended the event in 2019 has come forward to the police.

By February 2023, Klug's family offered a reward of 10,000 € in return for clues about Klug's whereabouts.

=== Discovery of Klug's remains ===
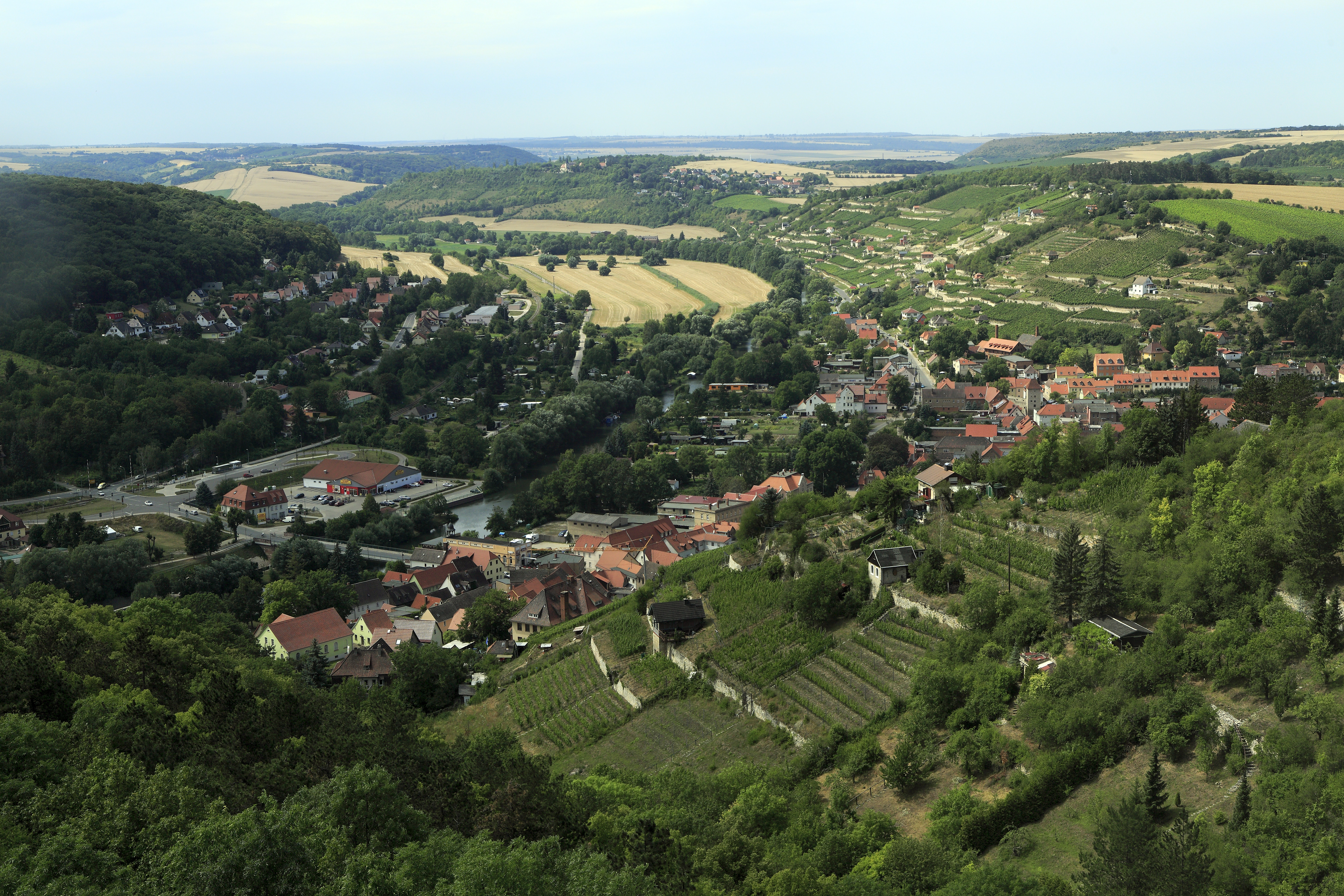
Freyburg (Unstrut) outside of which Klug's remains were discovered in a forest area (top left)

On February 25, 2023, Klug's remains were discovered by a passer-by in Rödel, a forest area near Freyburg, Saxony-Anhalt. Bone analysis confirmed the remains to be Klug's. There is currently no evidence for foul play. However, police are still investigating the cause of death and possible criminal activity. Rödel is a natural heritage site that is accessible on various hiking trails. The main trails are heavily frequented, but Klug's remains were found in a remote spot that prevented discovery for over three years.

In July of 2023 it was reported that the investigation was still ongoing and that the forensic report was unfinished. Therefore there was yet no information about Klug's cause of death or the possible involvement of another person. In March 2024 the state prosecutor's office renewed their statement that the investigation was ongoing.

As of 2024, police still saw no evidence of foul play, while Klug's father ruled out a suicide since no suicide note or other evidence has been found. Attempts to rescue data from Klug's cell phone found next to her remains had been unsuccessful but were still in progress. Analysis of the remains in a lab was still ongoing as well.

=== Criticism of police investigation ===
German journalist Peter Jamin who has followed missing person cases for more than 30 years criticized the way German police investigated this and similar cases. Crime suspicions were investigated hesitantly and possible connections to other cases were neglected. Jamin suggests a connection to the missing person case of Scarlett Salice who went missing in a different part of Germany in 2020.

== See also ==
- List of kidnappings
- List of solved missing person cases (post-2000)
- List of unsolved deaths
