= International Association of Scientologists =

Membership organization for Scientology

- Abbreviation: IAS
- Formation: October 7, 1984; 42 years ago
- Headquarters: Saint Hill Manor, East Grinstead, West Sussex, England, RH19 4JY UK
- Publication: Impact
- Parent organization: Church of Scientology
- Affiliations: Scientology
- Website: iasmembership.org

The International Association of Scientologists (IAS) is a fundraising and membership organization run by the Church of Scientology. Headquartered in England at Saint Hill Manor, the IAS operates several affiliated but similarly-named organizations. There are IAS offices in Australia, Canada, Denmark, Italy, Japan, Mexico, South Africa, Taiwan, United Kingdom, and three in the United States. The periodical magazine Impact is the official IAS publication.

The International Association of Scientologists (IAS): The membership organization of scientology—all scientologists are required to be members in order to qualify for discounts on books, meters, and services. It is also a major fundraising organization for scientology that has amassed a war chest to protect scientology. Originally formed to keep money out of the reach of the IRS in foreign bank accounts.

— Mike Rinder in A Billion Years

== Memberships and donations ==
The IAS has three membership levels: 6 months for free, annual and lifetime. It is mandatory for a Scientologist to be a member of the IAS in order to take services at a Church of Scientology, and all newcomers are given a free six month membership to start. As of 2024, annual memberships were $250 and lifetime membership were $5,000 for USA Scientologists.

For American Scientologists, membership fees are not tax-deductible and are paid to the International Association of Scientologists Administrations, whereas further donations are paid to the US IAS Members' Trust and are tax deductible.

== Honor statuses ==
Donations made to the IAS above and beyond membership fees are divided into "honor statuses" which are awarded when a Scientologist donates over specific monetary targets. Scientologists who reach honor statuses are published in the Impact magazine, are entitled to wear a commemorative pin, and attend IAS Patrons Ball events where they are given elaborate trophies with their names engraved on them.

By 2023 the honor status scale had grown to include numerous levels with such names as Sponsor, Crusader, Patron, Patron with Honors, Patron Meritorious, Silver Meritorious, Gold Meritorious, Platinum Meritorious, Diamond Meritorious, and the Laureate, Excalibur, Maximus, and Invictus series. Each successive level represents a higher donation, with more levels being added each year as the wealthiest donors reach cumulative donations in the hundreds of millions of dollars. For example, in 2011 a "patron" was someone who had donated at least $50,000. Nancy Cartwright became a Patron Laureate in 2007 for her donation of $10 million, and in 2023 was awarded "Patron Excalibur With Honors" for her $21 million donation.

== History ==
In 1984, the Church of Scientology was staring at an almost billion dollar tax bill from the IRS, and a $39 million judgment from a lawsuit in Oregon. Fearing a seizure of bank accounts, Scientology created the International Association of Scientologists. Purportedly a 'membership organization', it was set up in Europe "to keep all money made by scientology outside the US so that it could not be touched by the IRS". Churches of Scientology around the world which previously sent funds to the US were now directed to send their money to the IAS and its bank in Cyprus.

=== Pledge to Mankind ===
The ceremonial signing of the "Pledge to Mankind" was the official start of the IAS on October 7, 1984. Fairly long, the document included:

We, the undersigned, pledge ourselves, without reservation or any thought of personal comfort or safety, to achieving the aims of Scientology: "A civilization without insanity, without criminals and without war, where the able can prosper and honest beings can have rights, and where Man is free to rise to greater heights."

== Annual IAS event ==
Since 1984, the annual IAS event—also called the Gala Ball—has been held annually at Saint Hill Manor in England (with few exceptions). The purpose of the event is fund-raising; in 2005 the event collected $16 million. According to John Duignan it routinely took two months of preparations for an influx of thousands of Scientologists, and David Miscavige was on site for two weeks. Marquees are erected, and in 2004 "the 'tent' was big enough to comfortably house a Jumbo 747 and the accompanying 'service tents' made Saint Hill look like a huge refugee camp."

The Guardian wrote that in 2016 the event was a weekend-long gala celebration that "celebrated a year of expansion and accomplishment" and "featured a patrons ball in recognition of the newest patrons and their commitment to supporting the humanitarian activities and organisations that are the hallmark of the [IAS]".

In 2023, a former Scientologist arranged for a protest outside Saint Hill Manor during the event to "[send] Scientology a clear message: the abuse must stop". The previous demonstration was in 2008, led by the group Anonymous, which attracted over 300 people.

== Freedom Medal awards ==
Started in 1985, by 2008 there had been 80 Scientologists awarded a "Freedom Medal", including Kirstie Alley and John Travolta. According to John Duignan, Freedom Medals are awarded to those "who have done big press relations activity and mentioned Scientology or who have struck a major blow against psychiatry."

=== Freedom Medal of Valor ===
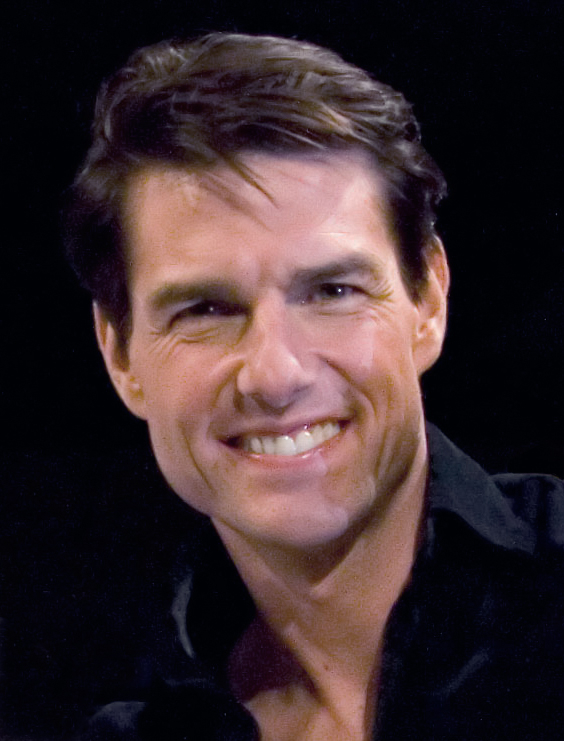
Tom Cruise in 2008

In 2004, Tom Cruise was awarded a special commendation, the Freedom Medal of Valor. A video interview of Cruise was played at the 2004 IAS event, followed by David Miscavige introducing Cruise as "the most dedicated Scientologist I have ever met" and Cruise responding by saluting Miscavige. Miscavige returned the salute and they hugged and then clasped hands to a standing ovation from the audience. The medal, the only one of its kind, was similar to other Freedom Medals but was larger, made of platinum and encrusted with diamonds.

In 2008, the video of Cruise's interview and award ceremony was posted on the internet and watched by millions of viewers. Originally created for an audience of Scientologists, the interview looked bizarre to outsiders and made Cruise look like "the ravings of a wild-eyed fanatic". The Church of Scientology tried to get the video taken down, but more copies would appear. Found by Anonymous, intrigued, they warred to keep the video online and later organized protests in front of Scientology buildings around the world.

== See also ==
- List of Scientology organizations
- List of Scientologists
