= Rehabilitation Project Force =

Scientology forced labor camp

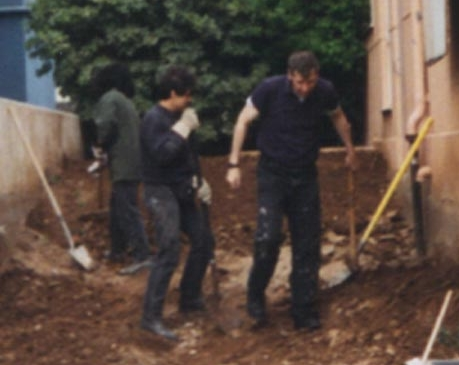
- RPF Members in Los Angeles
- Predecessor: Mud Box Brigade
- Formation: January 1974
- Type: Rehabilitation program for Sea Org members
- Methods: Manual labor, study, auditing

The Rehabilitation Project Force, or RPF, is the Church of Scientology's program for members of its Sea Organization who have allegedly violated expectations or policies. This may include members who are deemed to have hidden evil intentions towards Scientology, members who are unproductive in their work or who produce poor-quality work.

The program includes manual labor tasks and the study of L. Ron Hubbard's works. The rehabilitation program may take more than a year to complete, and the Church has been accused of overworking and mistreating its participants. Scholars, journalists, and former Scientologists have characterized the RPF as a forced labor and re-indoctrination program comparable to the Soviet gulag system.

== Development ==
The Rehabilitation Project Force developed out of a predecessor group, the Mud Box Brigade, which was formed aboard L. Ron Hubbard's private fleet in the late 1960s. (Note: Quote from Flag Order 1848, March 3, 1969: "MUD BOX BRIGADE, 1. persons appointed to it clean mud boxes, fuel lines, water lines, bilges, etc. It is under the MAA (Master-at-arms) and it reports to whoever needs it. More candidates will be appointed regularly and promptly every time I find a freeloader who is loafing on post and drifting with the wind. (Orders of the Day, January 4, 1968) 2. this group is the most downstat and one gets assigned to it by being a freeloader, invisible on post, loafing and really goofing up on one's job. (Flag Order 1701, January 5, 1969) REHABILITATION UNIT, formed in Division Five. It absorbs the old mud box brigade which is cancelled.") The mud box is a small perforated screening box fitted to the suction pipe in the bilge of a ship, and is designed to catch larger solid waste before it can choke the pipeline and potentially damage the pump. The Mud Box Brigade was assigned to clean out the mud box as well as fuel lines, water lines, bilges and other parts of the fleet's ships.

Hubbard defined the role as being essentially a punishment duty for unsatisfactory workers: "More candidates will be appointed regularly and promptly every time I find a freeloader who is loafing on post and drifting with the wind." Hubbard later clarified that "(T)his group is the most downstat [unproductive] and one gets assigned to it by being a freeloader, invisible on post, loafing and really goofing up on one's job."

In 1969, Hubbard replaced the Mud Box Brigade with the Rehabilitation Unit, again intended for those removed or disciplined "as ineffective or trouble." Following an evaluation, the individual was to receive a set of "specific recommendations which if followed will rehabilitate the individual as a highly effective and worthwhile Sea Org member." Hubbard instructed that "(T)he unit is [to be] worked hard during the day on a rigorous schedule on jobs assigned by the Review Chief handling corrective areas and jobs needing remedy and repair. The Unit itself is thus made into an effective ship's review team. It works on a one job, one time, one place formula completing each job before moving into the next. Each individual thus earns the right to the remedial services he or she will receive."

In January 1974, the Rehabilitation Unit was replaced with the Rehabilitation Project Force, or RPF. According to Hubbard, "the RPF has been created by the Commodore [Hubbard] so that redemption can occur. That is basically its only purpose." He identified four categories of people who were to be assigned to the RPF: "rockslammers" (people deemed to have hidden evil intentions, as detected by the E-meter); people who were unproductive and scored poorly on the Oxford Capacity Analysis personality test; "repeated stat crashers", people who were held responsible for declines in Scientology organizations' productivity; and "overt product makers", people who produced poor-quality work. As before, the unit was to work on "one job, one place, one time." A five-hour study period was to be implemented each day to improve the individuals' knowledge of Scientology.

== Description ==
According to David G. Bromley and Douglas E. Cowan, the RPF involves a daily regimen of five hours of auditing or studying, eight hours of work, often physical labor, such as building renovation, and at least seven hours of sleep. Mike Rinder wrote that the RPF is a "program for Sea Org members who are troublesome or failures. They are segregated from the rest of the group, undergo security checks, and perform manual labor all day. They may not speak to others." The uniform of RPF members is a black boilersuit.

RPF members work hard manual labor, which is called MEST work in Scientology parlance, often without the proper tools or safety equipment. They must run (not walk) everywhere they go, are restricted to base, have no liberties, eat leftovers from the crew mess hall, do the dirtiest jobs, and receive only one quarter of regular pay. RPFers receive no training for the types of construction jobs they frequently do, and must learn on the job.

The RPF was originally intended to last no more than a couple of months, where the assignee would learn Scientology auditing, if he or she was not already an auditor, by the "read it, drill it, do it" method. RPF members would then co-audit each other, it was claimed to better themselves and make each other more ethical and productive. Former Sea Org members who've been through the program charge that it is a form of re-indoctrination, one stating the "twin", or auditing partner he was given was actually "responsible for making sure he didn't escape."

== RPF's RPF ==
Sea Org members newly assigned to the RPF who do not want to be on the RPF are first assigned to the RPF's RPF until they choose to join the RPF. (Note: Quote: "The first RPF's RPF assignment was made because the person considered their RPF assignment amusing, an award and was therefore unable to recognize a need for redemption or any means to effect it. Until such time as the person recognized this need and of their own self-determinism requested to be included in RPF redemption actions, the restrictions applied.") When an RPFer messes up, they are assigned to the RPF's RPF, formerly called the "Bilge Brigade". (Note: Quote: "BILGE BRIGADE, RPF's RPF. (Flag Order 3434-27, "RPF Graduate Enhancement", November 25, 1974)")

Such members are segregated from other RPFers, get a maximum of six hours sleep per day, receive no pay, no training, no auditing, and may only work on the dirtiest and most demeaning jobs until they make amends or decide to join the RPF. Usual tasks were cleaning sludge and oil from a ship's bilge, or cleaning out the grease traps under the galley.

One of the punishments for those who messed up in the RPF was assignment to the RPF's RPF. You slept and ate separately from and were not allowed to even talk to other RPFers. When I hit the RPF's RPF for some infraction I don't recall, I was assigned to clean Rat's Alley. This was the crawl space beneath the main galley where the grease and slime ended up as the ovens and meal prep stations were cleaned up. It was a space about two feet high, inhabited by numerous rats who lived on the food waste that accumulated there. To clean Rat's Alley I had to lie on a furniture dolly on my stomach and wheel myself around with a flashlight to scrape grease into a bucket for two days until I graduated back to the regular RPF.

— Mike Rinder in A Billion Years

== Controversy ==
Scholars, journalists, and former Scientologists have called the RPF an "unusually brutal prison" and an "Orwellian prison", and have compared it to the gulag system of the Soviet Union and the Chinese re-education camps. Leaving the Sea Org, even from the RPF, results in what Scientology calls "freeloader debt" or a "freeloader's bill": retroactive billing for any auditing received or any Scientology training received while in the Sea Org, which can run into tens of thousands of dollars. While this "freeloader debt" is not legally binding, many former Scientologists have reported that they felt trapped by the "freeloader debt" policy.

In his book The Complex: An Insider Exposes the Covert World of the Church of Scientology, ex-Scientologist John Duignan describes RPF members living in a rat-infested basement, engaging in degrading jobs for years at a stretch, while denied visits with their spouses or children.

Douglas E. Cowan and David G. Bromley state that various scholars and observers have come to radically different conclusions about the RPF and whether it is "voluntary or coercive, therapeutic or punitive".

== Castile Canyon School ==
One location, known as the Castile Canyon School or "Happy Valley", has been identified as a former RPF facility. It was located east of San Jacinto, California and southeast of Gold Base, near the reservation of the Soboba Band of Luiseño Indians. This site was sold by the Church in 2002 to the Soboba Band, who turned it into a casino resort.

== Motto ==
The RPF is what you make it. The RPF is where you make it.

== See also ==
- Scientology controversies
- Re-education camps
