= Saint Hill Green =

Village in West Sussex, England

Coordinates: 51.104363°N 0.025266°W

- Location within West Sussex
- OS grid reference: TQ383357
- District: Mid Sussex
- Shire county: West Sussex
- Region: South East
- Country: England
- Sovereign state: United Kingdom
- Post town: EAST GRINSTEAD
- Postcode district: RH19
- Dialling code: 01342
- Police: Sussex
- Fire: West Sussex
- Ambulance: South East Coast
- UK Parliament: Mid Sussex

Saint Hill Green is a small village near East Grinstead, West Sussex, England. Its name is first attested in 1568 as Saynt Hill, which may mean "singed or burned hill".

It is notable for two country houses in the vicinity: Standen, designed by the architect Philip Webb in the Arts and Crafts style and now a National Trust property, and the 1792-built Saint Hill Manor, which had several notable owners before having been purchased by L. Ron Hubbard and becoming one of the international centres for the Church of Scientology, which he founded.
