= Beverly Hills Playhouse =

Acting school

Coordinates: 34°3′49.939″N 118°23′0.434″W

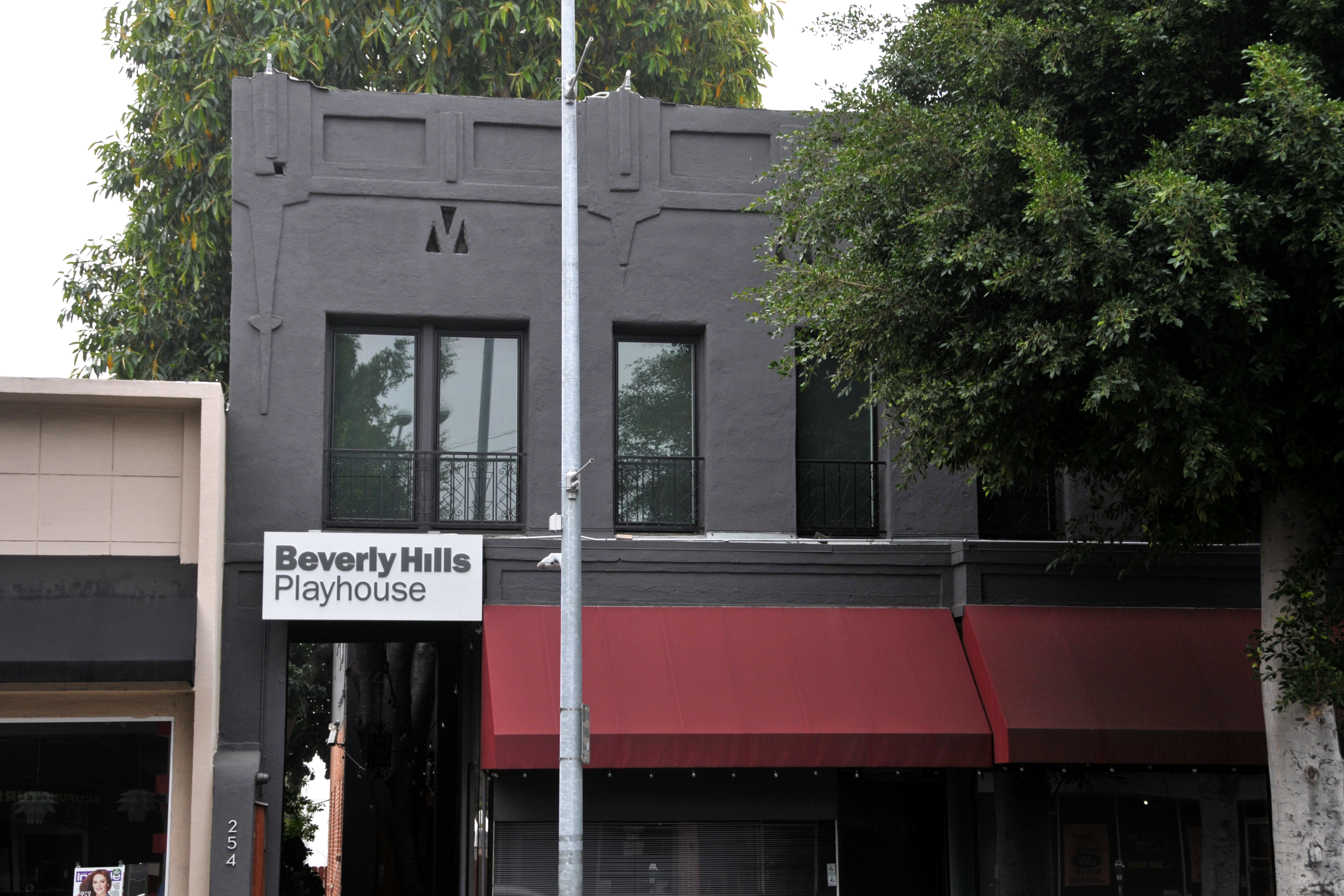
- The Beverly Hills Playhouse, 254 South Robertson Boulevard, Beverly Hills, in 2015
- Formation: 1954
- Type: Drama school
- Headquarters: 254 South Robertson Boulevard, Beverly Hills, California
- Region served: United States
- Website: bhplayhouse.com

The Beverly Hills Playhouse is an acting school with theaters and training facilities in Beverly Hills, California, and also in Los Angeles, San Francisco, and New York City. It is one of the oldest acting schools and theatres in the Los Angeles area.

== History ==
The location was originally home to the Bliss-Hayden School of Acting run by the husband and wife team of actress Lela Bliss and actor Harry Hayden. Veronica Lake, Mamie Van Doren and many other professional actors studied there.

In 1954, the Bliss-Hayden Theatre was acquired by Douglas Frank Bank and Jay Manford, and renamed The Beverly Hills Playhouse. This was a showcase for many productions written by Douglas Bank (The Preacher, and Journey to a Lonely Star) as well as well-known plays of the time including Jenny Kissed Me, Room Service, The Lawyer, Harvey, and The Second Man. Many actors had performed there including Stanley Adams, Anne Baxter, Ken Mayer, Michael Fox and Louella Parsons, and directors Larry Stewart and Arthur M. Lowe, Jr., as well as others. They owned the theatre until 1959.

In 1978, director and acting teacher Milton Katselas moved his already established acting classes to the location. Katselas ran the school until his death in 2008.

== The Beverly Hills Playhouse (BHP) Acting School ==
After Katselas' death in 2008, the BHP has been run by his longtime administrator Allen Barton.

The BHP operates out of its headquarters in Beverly Hills, as well as programs in San Francisco and New York City. Since 1984, it has also had an in-house non-profit theatre company (currently called The Skylight Theatre Company), which has produced hundreds of theatre productions, largely originated and fulfilled by the talent and interests of the BHP students. Its current focus under the leadership of Gary Grossman is the development of new plays, using the full array of talent available in the Los Angeles theatre community.

== Scientology ==
BHP membership was once strongly associated with the Church of Scientology, though the institution itself never had any affiliation. Church members included Katselas, Barton, and numerous high-profile students, including Jenna Elfman, Giovanni Ribisi, and Anne Archer. For decades BHP was described as a 'gateway' to Scientology, and the unspoken pressure to join reportedly caused discomfort among new students.

Katselas' teaching was strongly influenced by Scientology, and he remained a believer in Scientology his whole life. However, both Katselas and Barton became disaffected with the Church after the death of its founder, L. Ron Hubbard. According to Tony Ortega, "pretty much every Scientologist" at BHP left in 2007 when prominent Scientologist Grant Cardone accused Katselas of misconduct in his e-newsletter. After Lawrence Wright interviewed Barton in 2012 for the book Going Clear, Barton was declared a "suppressive person:" effectively a Church boycott. In 2015, BHP hosted a production of Disconnection, written and produced by Barton, strongly critical of the Church and its ethics culture.

== Notable Productions ==
- A Christmas Held Captive
