= David K. Barton =

American engineer (1927–2023)

David Knox Barton
- Born: September 21, 1927; Greenwich, Connecticut, United States
- Died: February 11, 2023 (aged 95); Hanover, New Hampshire
- Education: Harvard (1949)
- Awards: RCA's David W. Sarnoff Award (1958), IEEE Centennial Medal (1984), IEEE Third Millennium Medal, IEEE Dennis J. Picard Medal
- Scientific career
- Fields: radiolocation
- Workplaces: Signal Corps, RCA, Raytheon, ANRO Engineering, US Air Force Scientific Advisory Board

David Knox Barton (September 21, 1927 – February 11, 2023) was an American radar systems engineer who made significant contributions to air defense, missile guidance, monopulse radar, low-altitude tracking, air traffic control, and early warning radar. At age 30, he was the first winner of the David Sarnoff Award in Engineering, for his contributions to precise tracking radars. Holder of the IEEE's Centennial Medal, Millennium Medal, and Dennis J. Picard Medal, he is widely regarded throughout the world as a leading authority on radar technology. He authored a well-regarded series of reference books on radar engineering in the late 1970s. David Barton was one of the people behind the MIM-104 Patriot surface-to-air missile system.

In 1997, Barton was elected a member of the National Academy of Engineering for contributions to radar system design and analysis.
