= Chris Shelton (author) =

American former Scientologist

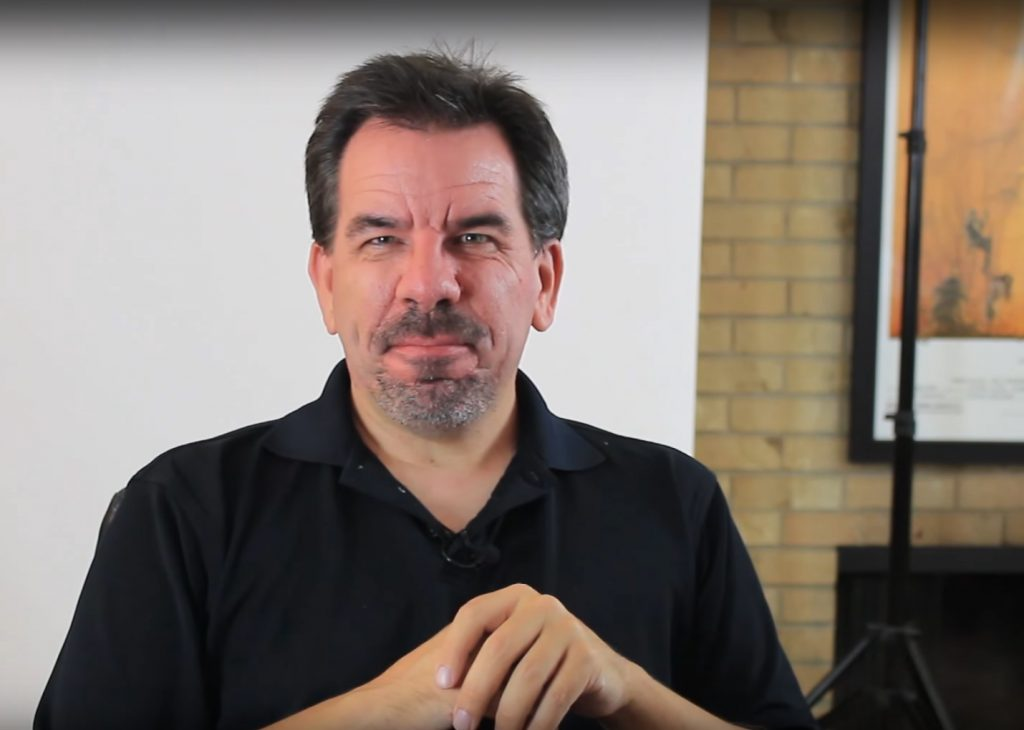
- Chris Shelton (2016)
- Born: Christopher Shelton; California
- Citizenship: United States
- Education: University of Salford (MSc)
- Occupations: Author, consultant, podcaster, youtuber, anti-cult activist

YouTube information
- Channel: Chris Shelton, MSc
- Genre: Video podcast
- Subscribers: 46.8K
- Views: 12.2M
- Last updated: May 16, 2026
- Website: chrissheltonmsc.org

Chris Shelton is an author, consultant, anti-cult activist, podcaster, YouTuber and former Scientologist. He was a member of the Church of Scientology for 27 years, and worked in the Sea Organization for 17 of those years.

== Biography ==
Shelton left Scientology in 2012, after which he started speaking out about his experiences. In 2015, his book Scientology᛬ A to Xenu: An Insider's Guide to What Scientology is Really All About was published. In 2016 he told the BBC, "In Scientology, critical thinking is not something they want people doing", and he states his goal is "public education [and] helping people recognize manipulation, think critically, and support those recovering from high‑control or abusive environments". In 2022 he completed a Master of Science (MSc) in Coercive Control from the University of Salford in Manchester, England. He has been quoted as an expert on Scientology-related issues in news reporting.

Shelton has hosted the weekly podcast Speaking of Cults on several platforms, with several hundred episodes on iHeartRadio since 2019. The podcast focuses on cults, coercive control, and recovery, and features interviews with survivors, psychologists, and researchers.

He appeared in the documentary series Leah Remini: Scientology and the Aftermath, including the episodes "Ask Me Anything" (2016) and "Waiting for Justice" (2019).

Shelton has been qualified as an expert witness on coercive control in several court cases involving online stalking.

== Works ==
- Scientology: A to Xenu – An Insider's Guide to What Scientology is Really All About (2015). ISBN 9781522879329
- What Now? A Practical Guide to Life After a Cult (2026) ISBN 9798295758133.
