= Saint Hill Manor =

Scientology campus in England

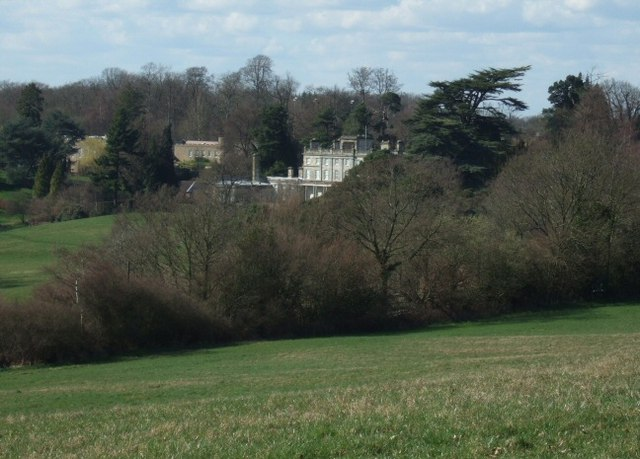

- Location within West Sussex
- 51°6′19.99″N 0°01′36.55″W
- Type: Country house
- Location: Saint Hill Green, East Grinstead
- OS grid reference: TQ 38237 35883

History
- Built: 1792

Site notes
- Area: West Sussex
- Architect: Benjamin Henry Latrobe (attrib.)
- Architectural style: Late Georgian
- Owner: Church of Scientology

Listed Building – Grade II
- Official name: Saint Hill Manor
- Designated: 2 August 1972
- Reference no.: 1249037

Saint Hill Manor is a Grade II listed country house at Saint Hill Green, near East Grinstead in West Sussex, England. It was constructed in 1792 and had several notable owners before being purchased by L. Ron Hubbard and becoming the British headquarters of Church of Scientology.

Numerous protests have taken place outside the property. In 2024 the Scientology organisation asked Mid Sussex District Council to put in place a public spaces protection order to prohibit public protest outside the property. Whilst protestors agreed to a code of conduct put forward by the council, the church of Scientology did not.

After council officers recommended against implementing a PSPO, Scientology withdrew their request. It was reported the process had cost the council more than £84,000.

== Early history ==
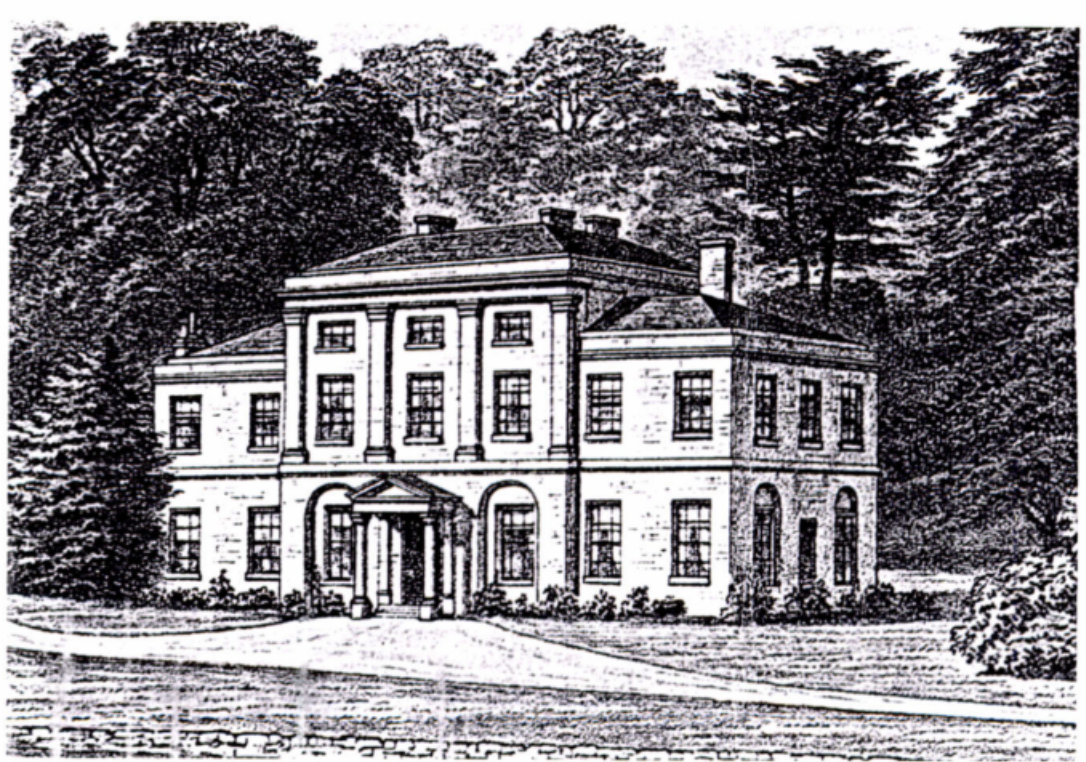
Lithograph of Saint Hill House in 1872, before later modifications were made

Saint Hill House, as it was originally known, was built in 1792 by Gibbs Crawfurd – Member of Parliament for the rotten borough of Queenborough – to a design attributed to Benjamin Henry Latrobe. The more famous neoclassical architects Robert Adam and his brother John produced their own mixed Gothic and neoclassical design for the house in 1785, apparently to an earlier commission from Crawfurd, but this was never implemented. The new house replaced an earlier building constructed in 1733 by Gibbs' father John, who had purchased the estate in 1715. The earlier Saint Hill House was illustrated in a surviving watercolour by the artist James Lambert.

Prior to the extensive modifications made in the late 19th and 20th centuries, the house comprised a three-storey central block and symmetrical two-storey flanking wings, all with hipped roofs behind parapets. Although the design is attributed to Latrobe, the plans have not survived and the details of his involvement are obscure. Local stonemason Henry Pocock is known to have been involved in the building of the house; Crawfurd presented him with a silver trowel, which still survives, inscribed "to Henry Pocock Saint Hill Aug. 1792".

The house is situated on the Saint Hill Estate, 59 acres (239,000 m^{2}) of landscaped gardens overlooking the hills of the High Weald. A number of archeological artefacts in the immediate area have been attributed to the existence of a small priory or early 17th-century dwelling on the site. The placename Saint Hill may mean "singed or burned hill".

The ownership of the house passed in 1793 to Crawfurd's eldest son Charles, and then in 1814 to his grandson Robert. Later owners included Edgar March Crookshank and Drexel Biddle, who commissioned the famous Monkey Mural which was painted by John Spencer-Churchill, nephew of Sir Winston Churchill. It was once owned by William Thomas Berger and in the late 19th Century served as the headquarters of the China Inland Mission. Hudson Taylor and Berger met there often and it was a centre for training recruits for the mission field. During the Second World War it was used as a convalescent home for Royal Air Force officers undergoing reconstructive surgery at East Grinstead's Queen Victoria Hospital.

The estate and a nearby farm were purchased in 1947 by Sawai Man Singh, the Maharaja of Jaipur. Under his ownership, the house became known as Saint Hill Manor.

== L. Ron Hubbard purchase ==
L. Ron Hubbard, the founder of the Scientology organisation, bought the Saint Hill estate from the Maharaja of Jaipur, Man Singh II, in 1959 for a reported price of £18,000. He lived there with his family until early 1966 before moving abroad, but never returned following the British government's decision in 1968 to declare him an "undesirable alien".

Under Hubbard's ownership, the house was extensively modified, with a series of extensions and new buildings constructed on the estate during the 1960s, 1970s and 1980s to accommodate the training and administration functions. The largest of these is a mock-gothic castle built after 1968 adjacent to the original house to provide a training facility for Scientology followers. The East Grinstead Urban District Council initially refused planning permission. After a public enquiry, however, the Church of Scientology was granted permission to proceed with the construction of "Saint Hill Castle".

Saint Hill Manor served as Hubbard's organisational headquarters until 1967. It was also the site of the organisation's first Distribution Centre, which was operative for the organisation's missionary outreach.

In August 1972, Saint Hill Manor was Grade II listed on the National Heritage List for England.

== 2015 renovations ==
The Church of Scientology's renovations on the Saint Hill Manor were completed in the summer of 2015 and are reported to have cost a total of US$16 million. The organisation claims that they are preserving it as a "historic monument". Its leader David Miscavige and Scientologist actor Tom Cruise donated $10,000 to cover the local rugby team's costs and invited team director Phil Major to an annual gala when their activities were disrupted for six months because of the renovations. Saint Hill Manor is now a museum that features the works of L. Ron Hubbard, and exhibits about what the Scientology organisation claims are his accomplishments.

Following the completion of the renovations, the Church of Scientology purchased seven new 29-seater ADL Enviro200 midibuses to transport the 400 staff members between the manor and the town of Crowborough, 14 miles (23 km) away.

== Protests ==
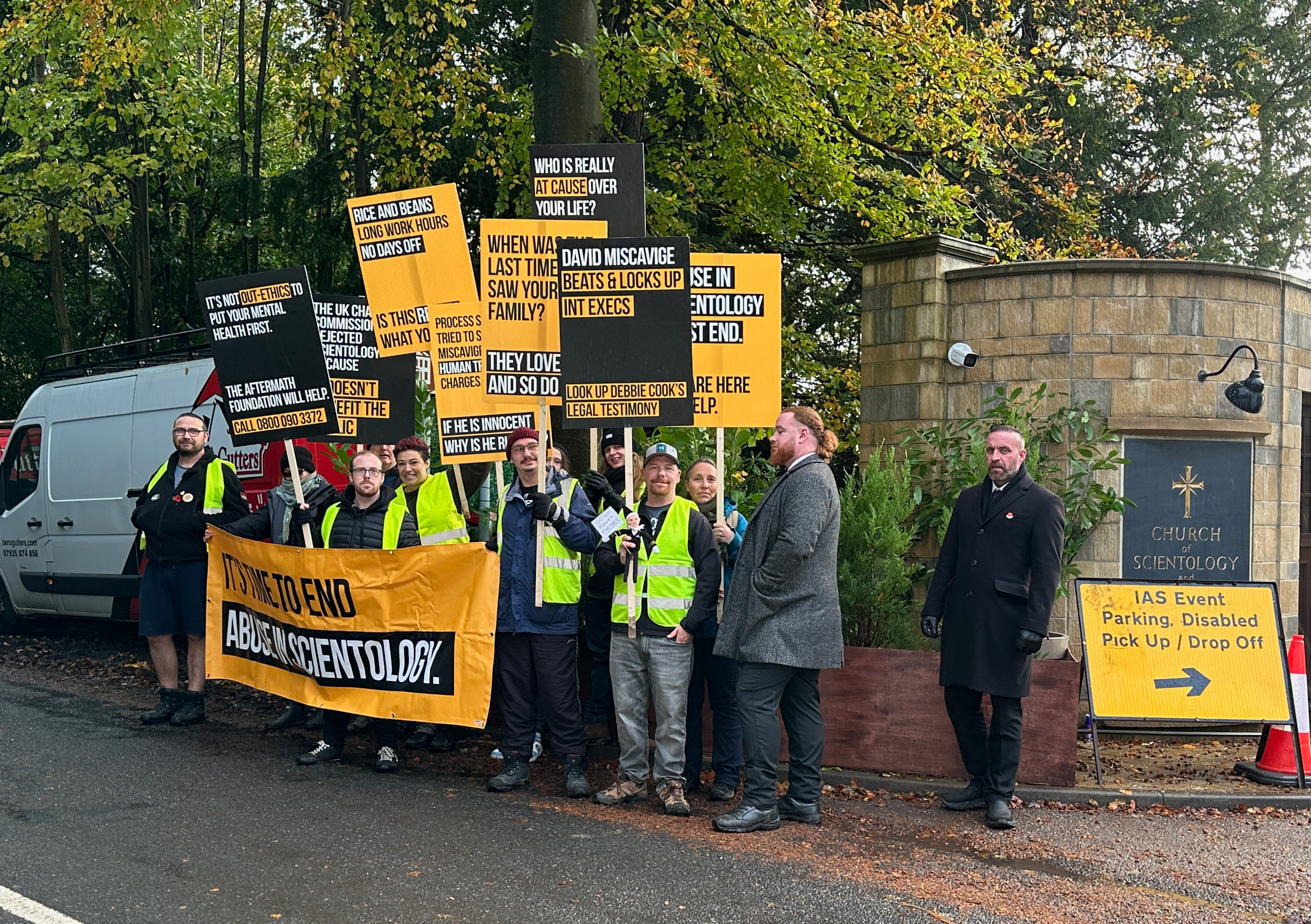
Group of demonstrators outside Saint Hill Manor, October 2023

Protests against Scientology abuses have been held outside the gates of Saint Hill Manor grounds in 2008, 2023 and 2024. Prior to the 2024 International Association of Scientologists event, which was to be held there on 25 October 2024, the Church of Scientology asked the Mid Sussex District Council to put in place a public spaces protection order to prohibit protesting outside the property.

Protest organiser Alexander Barnes-Ross said this was a "direct threat to [ex-Scientologists] freedom of speech and right to protest". The district council scrutiny committee decided that the issue should be consulted on by the cabinet, and stated that observations by the Council and the Police would be made during the event.

During the consultation process the Church of Scientology sent Mid Sussex District Council a dossier containing un-redacted Medical Records and personal information of attendees of the 2024 IAS demonstration.

Days prior to the council vote on the implementation of a PSPO it was revealed that council officers were recommending to refuse the implementation of the order. Subsequent to this report in the news the Church of Scientology withdrew its application for a PSPO. It was reported that the cost of considering the PSPO application had cost Mid Sussex District Council more than £84,000.

Mid Sussex District Council voted against the implementation of the PSPO at a Cabinet Meeting held on 30 June 2025.

Minutes from the meeting show gratitude by the council leader for the professionalism of the council officers who gathered all the evidence during the consultation process. Officers had determined there were issues related to the IAS event, "specifically traffic disruption, risk of pedestrians walking in the road in the dark and noise nuisance".

It was noted that a voluntary code-of-conduct drawn up the by council, by way of avoiding a PSPO, was agreed upon by the demonstrators but not by the Church of Scientology. It was additionally noted that demonstrators had been neither aggressive nor threatening. It was also stated that police submissions had stated of demonstrators that "matters had been peaceful at all protests".

Additionally the leader of the council urged the Church of Scientology to refer itself to the Information Commissioner's Office for the dossier compiled on the demonstrators, as it constituted a data breach.

== See also ==
- Scientology in the United Kingdom
