= Shawn Lonsdale =

American activist (1969–2008)

- During an interview in Scientology and Me
- Born: May 21, 1969
- Died: February 16, 2008 (age 38); Clearwater, Florida
- Known for: Videographer and critic of Church of Scientology

Shawn Lonsdale (May 21, 1969 – February 16, 2008) was a videographer and critic of the Church of Scientology. He lived in Clearwater, Florida, and regularly videotaped members of Scientology coming and going from church activities in Clearwater. Lonsdale had initially intended to do a photography project on homeless people in Clearwater, but after an experience at a City Council meeting, he began to research Scientology. Lonsdale got into an argument with a Scientologist at the City Council meeting, and the Scientologist followed him home and the next day Lonsdale observed a van waiting for two hours outside his home. After researching the Church of Scientology on critical websites, he decided to expose information about the organization. He established a website, and filmed video footage of Scientologists going about activities in Clearwater, and aired edited footage on a local Public-access television cable TV station. After getting into a physical altercation with Lonsdale while he was filming, a scientologist was arrested and charged with misdemeanor battery, but was later released and the charges were dropped.

The Church of Scientology hired private investigators and discovered that Lonsdale had a criminal record, and this was subsequently publicized by a Scientologist on fliers and on a website. In 2006, Lonsdale was subpoenaed by the Church of Scientology, which accused him of being affiliated with the Lisa McPherson Trust, a group critical of Scientology which was restricted in where it could protest in Clearwater. In 2007, Lonsdale appeared on the BBC Panorama program Scientology and Me and was interviewed by journalist John Sweeney. Later in the program, Sweeney lost his temper and shouted at a Scientology representative when he was accused of giving Lonsdale a "soft interview". Lonsdale died suddenly on February 16, 2008, and a Clearwater police spokeswoman stated that the death appeared to be suicide.

== Critic of Scientology ==
Lonsdale, never a Scientologist himself, became critical of the Church of Scientology in mid-2006, and often stood outside in downtown Clearwater near Scientology's spiritual headquarters wearing a sandwich board sign that read "Cult Watch". Lonsdale became interested in Scientology after getting into a fight with a Scientologist over redevelopment issues while at a City Council meeting. After the Scientologist followed Lonsdale's car home and Lonsdale noticed a van parked in front of his home for two hours the following day, he began to research the background of Scientology on anti-Scientology sites on the Internet and in the library. He taped hours of footage of Scientology staffers, security guards, and verbal confrontations with Scientologists, and edited clips into a pseudo-documentary which aired on local public-access television. Lonsdale dropped fliers outside downtown businesses and picked through trash from a Scientology-owned business and posted documents online. He parked outside a Scientology cafeteria with posters in his car window which stated that key Scientology texts were available for free on the Internet: "OT I-VIII for free at xenu.net."

On July 8, 2006, Lonsdale got into a physical altercation with a Scientologist while filming the Church of Scientology in Clearwater. A spokeswoman for the Church of Scientology told Bay News 9 that Lonsdale had been harassing their staff members, and that the fight was not related to the church. Lonsdale stated "Basically, I'm filming a pseudo-documentary for one of our free-access Pinellas web channels," and said that while filming a Scientologist came out of a coffee shop and yelled that Lonsdale was a religious bigot. Lonsdale stated "I picked up the camera again and started filming him ... He went right for my face and my head, backed me up into a pole to which I had no other choice but to defend myself." The Scientologist was arrested by Clearwater police and charged with battery, but the State Attorney's Office of Florida decided not to pursue charges. After the incident the Clearwater police Deputy Chief viewed a videotape of the altercation, and concluded that Lonsdale was the victim and that his police officers made the right decision in arresting the Scientologist. After viewing the videotape, the Assistant State Attorney stated "it is just not going to be a prosecutable case," and said that the video shows "pretty much mutual aggression" between Lonsdale and the Scientologist. The Assistant State Attorney stated that the video showed aggression on both sides, and that Lonsdale's criticism of Scientology on the internet made the case "unprosecutable". Lonsdale's attorney Luke Lirot stated "It is another example of the State Attorney's Office's historical reluctance to tangle with Scientology." Scientology spokeswoman Pat Harney said that church members had been told to avoid Lonsdale, and told the St. Petersburg Times that Scientologists had complained to police that they felt Lonsdale was stalking them. The police did not charge Lonsdale, stating that he had the right to take photos and video in public places.

=== Response by Church of Scientology ===
The Church of Scientology responded to Lonsdale's activities by hiring a private investigator to investigate him. The private investigator discovered that Lonsdale had two misdemeanor convictions for lewd and lascivious conduct dating back to 1999 and 2000, both related to public sex with men. In mid-July 2006, Posters with a mug shot of Lonsdale appeared in store windows warning that he had been arrested for sex crimes and was dangerous. The Church of Scientology told Bay News 9 that it did not hand out the fliers, but that they came from an organization calling the "Cleveland Street Safety League". The St. Petersburg Times reported that the man behind the "Cleveland Street Safety League" is "a longtime Scientologist known for confronting critics". The Scientologist behind the Cleveland Street Safety League created a website about Lonsdale and posted his arrest record and comments Lonsdale had made on a swinger site, and also called Lonsdale's family in New England claiming that Lonsdale needed mental help.

Lonsdale's employer and landlord received phone calls from Scientology representatives who claimed that he was a religious bigot and dangerous. Lonsdale was subpoenaed by the Church of Scientology for a deposition in the fall of 2006, and the Church claimed that he belonged to an anti-Scientology group which had previously been barred from protesting in certain areas in downtown Clearwater, the Lisa McPherson Trust. Luke Lirot, the lawyer who defended Lonsdale in the matter, told the St. Petersburg Times: "I found him to be quite affable and truly a very intelligent man ... I certainly hope that a very thorough investigation is conducted." In his deposition, Lonsdale stated he was unemployed and began to educate himself about Scientology while working on a photography project on homeless people in Clearwater. After reading more about Scientology, he decided to shed light on the organization and irritate Scientologists. Of the claims Scientology made that Lonsdale was affiliated with the Lisa McPherson Trust, Lirot commented: "It was obvious to everybody he had nothing to do with the trust, and the trust had been disbanded and dissolved many years prior ... They just wanted to try to come up with a way to preclude him from exercising his right to picket in downtown Clearwater, and they were unsuccessful in doing that."

== Scientology and Me ==
In May 2007, Lonsdale appeared on BBC's Panorama program in a piece titled "Scientology and Me", and was interviewed about his experiences as a critic of Scientology by journalist John Sweeney. When Sweeney asked Lonsdale why the Church of Scientology was publicizing derogatory things about him, Lonsdale replied: "They are trying to embarrass me. They try to paint you as crazy, so that no one will listen to you." During their interview, Tommy Davis arrived, opened a folder, and began to read out loud Lonsdale's criminal record. Later in the program, Sweeney was accused by Scientologist Tommy Davis of giving "convicted sexual pervert Shawn Lonsdale" a "soft interview". Sweeney lost his temper and began yelling at Davis, with both men shouting at each other back and forth. A Scientology-produced video of the incident was uploaded to YouTube and viewed over 856,000 times.

== Death ==
In 2007, Lonsdale let his Scientology critique website lapse, and posted less frequently on his blogs and anti-Scientology message boards and chat forums. Spokeswoman Pat Harney stated that the Church had not heard from Lonsdale for months before his death. Former Scientologist Randy Payne told the St. Petersburg Times that Lonsdale "found it impossible" to make a living while spending the majority of his time as a critic of Scientology. Payne stated that in December 2007 Lonsdale had found steady work, and had planned to go back to school in order to get a private investigator's license.

Clearwater police discovered Lonsdale's body after they were alerted by neighbors and found a garden hose connecting the exhaust pipe of Lonsdale's car with one of the windows of his home. Clearwater police spokeswoman Elizabeth Daly-Watts stated that there were no signs of foul play involved, and that police found what they believed to be a suicide note. Daly-Watts said that "It does appear to be a suicide." Police officially ruled Lonsdale's death as suicide on May 2, 2008.

Scientology spokeswoman Pat Harney called Lonsdale's apparent suicide "awful" and stated "It's just unfortunate anybody feels they have to go to that length ... I wouldn't wish that on anybody." Jerald Rowlett, a fellow Scientology critic and friend from Michigan, told The Tampa Tribune: "In many ways Shawn was a hero to me ... He had a hard life and a history he knew Scientology would use to hurt him. And yet he still felt strongly enough to try to inform the public about the actions of Scientology." On March 1, 2008, John Sweeney remembered Lonsdale and spoke about him on the BBC Radio 4 program, From Our Own Correspondent. Sweeney stated: "Clearwater got that little bit more creepy recently, with the death - the police are treating it as suicide - of Shawn. When alive a Scientology spokesman said of him: 'He has no redeeming value to anyone, anywhere.' Well, he was a bit of a hero to me ... I for one mourn the loss - of a brave and singular American".
