= Tommy Davis (Scientology) =

American financial executive

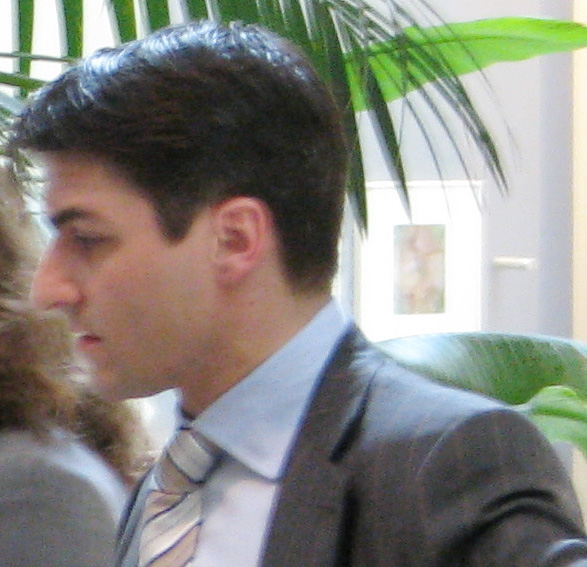
- Davis in 2009
- Born: Thomas William Davis; August 18, 1972 (age 54)
- Spouses: Nadine Van Hootegem (m. 1998, divorced) Jessica Feshbach (m. 2007; div. 2018) Maie Ibrahim (m. 2019)
- Parents: William Davis (father); Anne Archer (mother)
- Relatives: John Archer (maternal grandfather); Marjorie Lord (maternal grandmother)

Thomas William Davis (born August 18, 1972) is an American financial executive. From 2005 to 2011, Davis was the head of external affairs and chief spokesperson of the Church of Scientology International and Senior Vice President at the Church of Scientology Celebrity Centre International from the early 1990s. Between 2011 and 2013, Davis did not make any media public appearances. In June 2013, it was revealed Davis and his wife had relocated from Gold Base in Riverside County, California, to Austin, Texas. He currently resides in Los Angeles.

In 2016, he became the General Manager of Consolidated Press Holdings North America LLC, a private investment vehicle owned by Australian billionaire James Packer, but his employment was terminated in July 2017.

== Career in Scientology ==
=== Celebrity Centre ===
Davis previously worked for the Sea Org as a non-uniformed member. According to a Church of Scientology press release, in 2001 Davis was the Celebrity Centre's Vice President. He was the chief spokesperson of the Church of Scientology from 2005 to 2011, a position previously held by Mike Rinder.

On June 13, 2003, Davis went with actor and Scientologist Tom Cruise and Kurt Weiland, director of external affairs for Scientology's Office of Special Affairs and Scientology vice president of communications, to meet with then-United States Deputy Secretary of State Richard Armitage. In the half-hour-long private meeting, they raised concerns with Armitage about the treatment of Scientologists in Germany and other countries.

Davis was a senior-level Scientologist, spokesman for the Church of Scientology, and a member of the Church of Scientology's Sea Organization or "Sea Org". He is a member of the International Association of Scientologists, and as of 2006 was listed as a Patron in their publication Impact Magazine.

=== Representative to the media ===
Davis accompanied Rolling Stone writer Janet Reitman, along with the former head of Scientology's Office of Special Affairs Mike Rinder, on a tour of the Gold Base in Hemet, California, in 2005. In 2007, Davis gained international attention from events surrounding the making of a documentary about Scientology entitled "Scientology and Me", screened as an episode of the BBC public affairs series Panorama. The Panorama reporter, John Sweeney, reported he had met with Davis early on and could not reach agreement with him on whether individuals attacking Scientology should be interviewed for the film, and whether the program should refer to Scientology as a "cult". As the BBC documentary was filmed, Scientologists made a parallel documentary called Panorama: Exposed, with a camera crew shadowing Sweeney and chronicling his work. Davis made allegations against Panorama and the BBC that they were "spying" on the church of Scientology and harassed Sweeney by stalking him to various meetings with critics. Nonetheless, he never filed a report against Sweeney.

While Sweeney was visiting the Scientology exhibition "Psychiatry: An Industry of Death", Davis accused him of being biased and of having been too easy on one of his interviewees. Sweeney lost his temper. The Church of Scientology released the resulting footage, showing Sweeney becoming angry, on YouTube, and the counter-documentary attacking Sweeney's methods was posted to UK politicians and media organizations. Panorama responded by posting its own YouTube clip, showing Davis losing his temper and abruptly ending an interview when Sweeney used the words "sinister cult". The BBC subsequently stated it was happy that on the whole, Sweeney had performed his work in a fair and proper manner.

In the same BBC documentary, Davis interrupted when celebrity members are asked about Xenu, saying: "None of us know what you're talking about. It's loony. It's weird." In a May 8, 2008, appearance on CNN, Davis was asked by CNN's John Roberts if "... the basic tenet of the Church of Scientology is to rid the body of space-alien parasites, to clear oneself"; Davis responded: "Well, John, does that sound silly to you? I mean it’s unrecognizable to me." In response, Tony Ortega of The Village Voice stated "It’s also a grand tradition, among Scientology spokespeople, to act bewildered when they’re facing a camera and they’re asked about Xenu and space-alien thetans. Tommy Davis is just doing what other mouthpieces have said in the past." In March 2009, Davis was interviewed by investigative journalist Nathan Baca for KESQ-TV and was again asked about the OT III materials containing the Xenu myth. When read an excerpt from Hubbard's writing, Davis told Baca "I'm familiar with the material," and said that the issue at hand was "the confidential scriptures of the Church," and thus refused to elaborate on the issue.

After the death of Jett Travolta, son of celebrity Scientologist John Travolta, the Church of Scientology came under fire from critical groups accusing it of being irresponsible; Jett had died of a seizure soon after being taken off his medication. Davis responded by denying Scientology keeps people from taking medications, and also denying it claims to cure disease. He stated in one interview, "The bottom line is that Scientologists seek conventional medical treatment for medical conditions."

Davis was interviewed by journalist Martin Bashir for the ABC News program Nightline, in a piece called "Inside Scientology", which aired in October 2009. Davis ripped off his microphone and stormed off the set of the interview after he was questioned about whether he believed that 75 million years ago a galactic ruler called Xenu brought individuals to Earth and killed them in volcanoes.

The following week Hollywood film director Paul Haggis accused Davis of lying on CNN, when Davis said disconnection did not happen, but Haggis and his wife were "ordered" by Scientology to disconnect from family. Haggis, in the same letter, announced he was leaving the organization. Davis responded that Haggis's claims were based on misunderstandings.

In 2009, Larry Anderson, an actor, spoke with Davis about getting his money and leaving Scientology, which was reported in the St. Petersburg Times.

In July 2010, the Church of Scientology International publicized a "Scientology Newsroom" website tailored for members of the media; Davis was one of four international representatives for Scientology listed as spokespersons. John Sweeney and Mike Rinder, a former Scientology relations officer stated in a BBC documentary, The Secrets of Scientology, that Davis authorized the following of Sweeney in order to provoke a reaction by mental engagement. Davis was quoted as saying, "I can drive him 'psychotic'." During the production of The Secrets of Scientology, Davis once again ensured that the Church's fair game policy was aggressively enforced, with a camera team chronicling the activities of Sweeney and Mike Rinder. Their filming this time was considerably more overt. He also commissioned a second parallel documentary; Panorama: Desperate Lies, listing off further alleged violations of BBC and Ofcom Broadcast Codes in both of Sweeney's programs, and attempting to further discredit Church detractors featured.

== Personal life ==
Davis is the son of real estate investor William Davis and film actress and Scientologist Anne Archer. He was raised in his mother's former religion, Christian Science, however she joined Scientology when he was 3 years old. Davis claimed after taking two courses at the Celebrity Centre, he became a Scientologist at the age of 17. He attended Harvard School For Boys in Los Angeles, a private Episcopal church-affiliated college preparatory school (now called Harvard-Westlake School). In 1990, he was accepted at Columbia University. He attended college for a semester, but dropped out to join the Sea Org.

Davis worked closely with actor and Scientologist Tom Cruise, frequently accompanying him on lobbying and diplomatic meetings for the church. He is a former friend of actor Jason Beghe, who left the church in 2007. He is independently wealthy due to his family's success in real estate, and told Rolling Stone: "I have enough money to never work a day in my life."

Davis was married to Jessica Feshbach, who was a fellow spokesperson for the Church of Scientology but left that position in mid-2011. The pair divorced in 2018. They have two children. In 2019, he married Egyptian actress Maie Ibrahim.
