= Country Air =

Country Air may refer to:

- Country Air (film), a 1933 Italian film
- "Country Air", a song by the Beach Boys on the album Wild Honey
- Country Airs, album by Rick Wakeman
