= Marjorie Lord =

American actress (1918–2015)

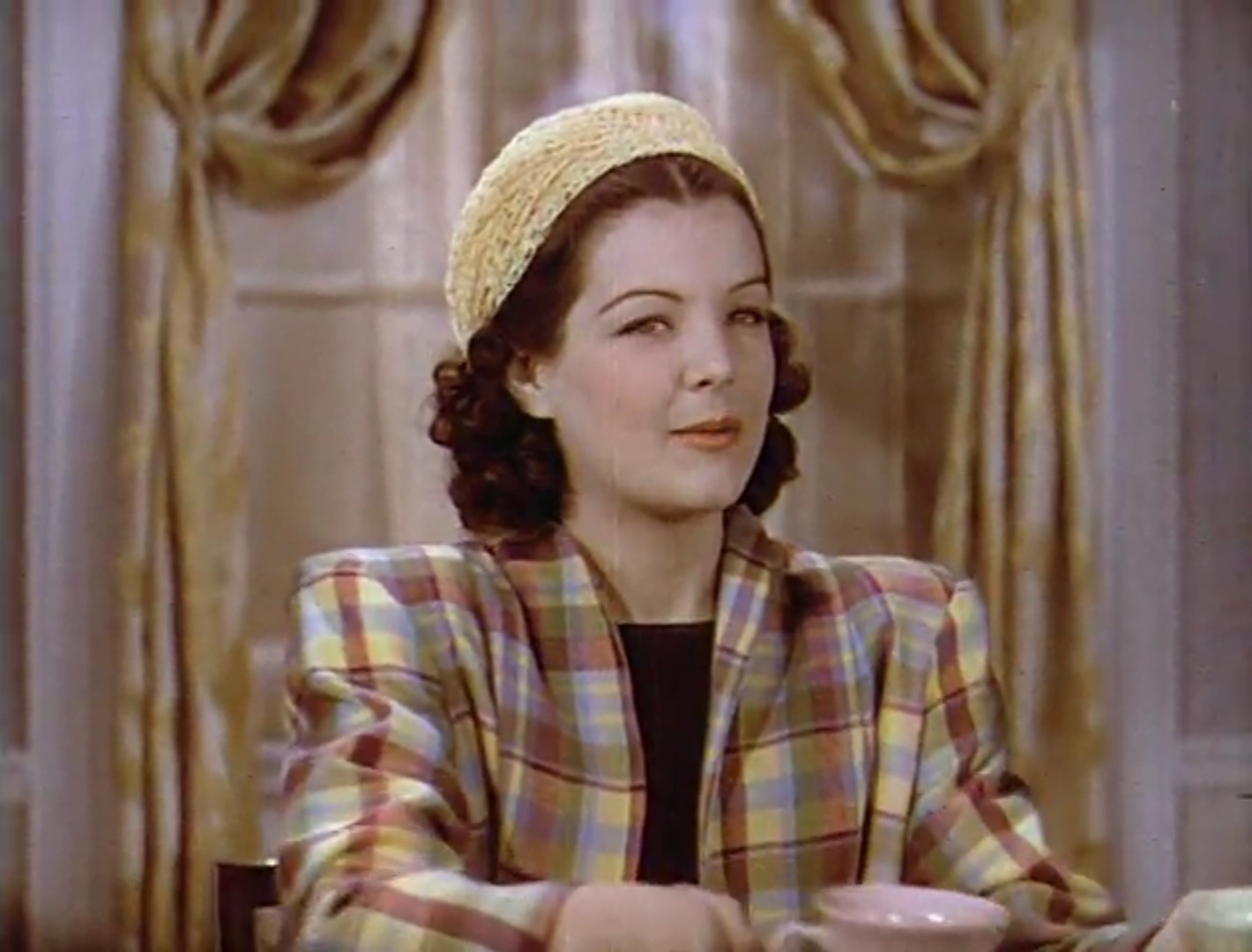
- Lord in The Middleton Family at the New York World's Fair
- Born: Marjorie Wollenberg; July 26, 1918; San Francisco, California, U.S.
- Died: November 28, 2015 (aged 97); Beverly Hills, California, U.S.
- Occupation: Actress
- Years active: 1935–2008
- Spouses: John Archer (m. 1941; div. 1955) Randolph Hale (m. 1958; died 1974) Harry Volk (m. 1976; died 2000)
- Children: 2, including Anne Archer
- Relatives: Tommy Davis (grandson)

Marjorie Lord (née Wollenberg; July 26, 1918 – November 28, 2015) was an American television and film actress. She played Kathy "Clancy" O'Hara Williams, opposite Danny Thomas's character on The Danny Thomas Show (Make Room for Daddy).

== Early years ==
Lord was born in San Francisco, California, the daughter of Lillian Rosalie (née Edgar) and George Charles Wollenberg. During her early childhood, she was a ballet dancer. Her father was a cosmetics executive. Her paternal grandparents were German, as were two of her maternal great-grandparents. Her family moved to New York City when she was 15.

== Career ==
=== Stage ===
In 1935, at the age of 16, Lord made her Broadway debut in The Old Maid with Judith Anderson. Her other Broadway appearances came in Signature (1945), Little Brown Jug (1946), and The Girl in the Freudian Slip (1967).

Although most of Lord's success came in television, she said in 1963: "I am primarily a stage actress. That's what I was trained to do and that's my first love."

In the 1970s, Lord was active in dinner theater productions, spending 34 weeks in such presentations in 1973 alone.

=== Film ===
One film reference book summarized Lord's movie career by saying, "For two decades, she played leading roles in mostly routine films ..."

Lord was signed by RKO Radio Pictures in 1935. While appearing in Springtime for Henry with Edward Everett Horton, director Henry Koster approached her and signed her to a contract with Universal Studios. She appeared in six feature films and a film serial The Adventures of Smilin' Jack for Universal. Her film work includes a number of wartime pictures, including the 1943 mystery Sherlock Holmes in Washington, starring Basil Rathbone in the title role. She also appeared in the Western films Masked Raiders, Mexican Manhunt, and Down Laredo Way. In 1966, she played Mrs. Martha Meade, the wife of Bob Hope's character, in the screwball comedy Boy, Did I Get a Wrong Number!.

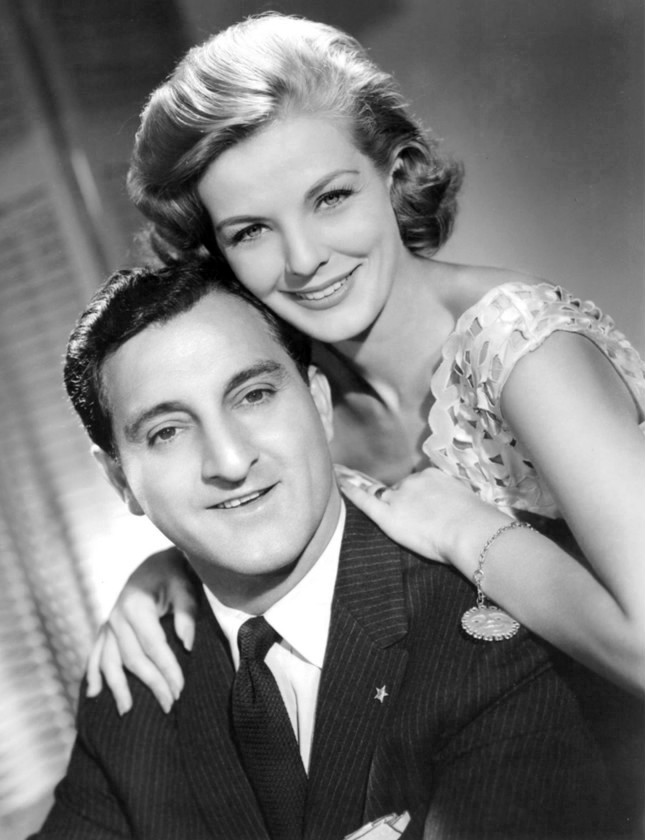
Marjorie Lord with Danny Thomas, 1957

=== Television ===
Lord appeared in a 1950 episode of The Lone Ranger titled "Bullets for Ballots", also featuring Craig Stevens, and a 1955 episode entitled "The Law Lady". She appeared on the 1951 episode "The Return of Trigger Dawson" of Bill Williams's syndicated western television series The Adventures of Kit Carson and the 1954 production of "Shadow of Truth" on Ford Theatre.

In 1956, while she was appearing in Anniversary Waltz, Lord caught the attention of Danny Thomas, who asked her to replace Jean Hagen as his television wife on Make Room for Daddy. Hagen had played Thomas' wife since the series' inception, but she was written out of the script in 1956 at the end of her contract. Lord accepted the role and joined the cast of the show, now called The Danny Thomas Show. She played the role until the show was cancelled in 1964. In 1970, Lord and Thomas, along with several other original supporting actors, returned to television with Make Room for Granddaddy. The show lasted just one season.

=== Later years ===
Lord remained active beyond her 90th birthday. On May 8, 2008, she participated in a "Salute to Television Moms" panel discussion organized by the Academy of Television Arts and Sciences.

== Recognition ==
Lord has a star in the television section of the Hollywood Walk of Fame, at 6317 Hollywood Boulevard. The star was dedicated on February 8, 1960.

== Personal life ==
Lord was married three times. She wed actor John Archer on December 30, 1941, and they had two children, including actress Anne Archer. They were married from 1941 until their divorce in 1955. Her second husband was producer Randolph Hale, to whom she was married from 1958 until his death in 1974. Her third husband was Harry Volk, the former CEO of Union Bank and a Los Angeles philanthropist, to whom she was married from 1976 until his death in 2000. Her memoir is entitled A Dance and a Hug. Lord is grandmother of Tommy Davis, son of her daughter Anne.

=== Death ===
Lord died on November 28, 2015, aged 97, at her home in Beverly Hills, California of natural causes. Upon her death, she was cremated and her ashes given to her son, Gregg Archer.

== Filmography ==
=== Film ===
Year	Title	Role	Notes	Ref
1937	High Flyers	Arlene Arlington	Musical comedy film directed by Edward F. Cline	
1937	On Again-Off Again	Florence Cole	Musical comedy film directed by Edward F. Cline	
1937	Forty Naughty Girls	June Preston	American comedy directed by Edward F. Cline	
1937	Hideaway	Joan Peterson	Comedy film directed by Richard Rosson	
1937	Border Café	Janet Barry	Western film directed by Lew Landers	
1939	The Middleton Family at the New York World's Fair	Babs	Directed by Robert R. Snody	
1942	Escape from Hong Kong	Valerie Hale and Fraulein K	American comedy film directed by William Nigh	
1942	Moonlight in Havana	Patsy Clark	American romantic comedy film directed by Anthony Mann	
1943	Johnny Come Lately	Jane	Drama film directed by William K. Howard	
1943	Sherlock Holmes in Washington	Nancy Partridge	The fifth film in the Basil Rathbone/Nigel Bruce series of Sherlock Holmes films.; Directed by Roy William Neill	
1943	Shantytown	Virginia Allen	Crime film directed by Joseph Santley	
1943	Hi, Buddy	Mary Parker		
1943	The Adventures of Smilin' Jack	Janet Thompson	Serial based on comic strip directed by Lewis D. Collins and Ray Taylor	
1947	New Orleans	Grace Volcella	Musical romance film directed by Arthur Lubin	
1948	The Strange Mrs. Crane	Gina Crane, alias of Jennie Hadley	Crime film-noir film directed by Sam Newfield	
1948	The Argyle Secrets	Marta	Mystery romance directed by Cy Endfield	
1949	Masked Raiders	Gale Trevett aka Diablo Kid	Western directed by Lesley Selander	
1949	Air Hostess	Jennifer White	Action drama directed by Lew Landers	
1950	Chain Gang	Rita McKelvey	American drama film directed by Lew Landers and written by Howard J. Green.	
1950	The Lost Volcano	Ruth Gordon	Adventure film directed by Ford Beebe	
1950	Riding High	Mary Winslow	Musical film directed by Frank Capra	
1951	Stop That Cab	Mary Thomas	Comedy, crime film directed by Eugenio de Liguoro	
1951	Venture of Faith		Drama directed by Frank R. Strayer	
1953	Mexican Manhunt	Sheila Barton	American crime film directed by Rex Bailey	
1953	Down Laredo Way	Valerie	American western film directed by William Witney	
1954	Port of Hell	Kay Walker	Drama directed by Harold D. Schuster	
1966	Boy, Did I Get a Wrong Number!	Mrs. Martha Meade	American comedy film directed by George Marshall	

=== Television ===
Year	Title	Role	Notes	Ref
1949	Your Show Time		Episode: "The Real Thing" (S 1:Ep 8)	
1950	The Lone Ranger	Kitty McQueen	Episode: "Bullets for Ballots" (S 1:Ep 35)	
1951	Hollywood Opening Night		Episode: "Hand on My Shoulder" (S 1:Ep 9)	
1952	Fireside Theatre	Sue Brown	Episode: "Brown of Calaveras" (S 4:Ep 33)	
1952	Fireside Theatre	Gwen	Episode: "Mirage" (S 4:Ep 41)	
1952	China Smith	Ruth Cotton	Episode: "Devil-In-The-Godown" (S 1:Ep 6)	
1952	Fireside Theatre	Catherine	Episode: "Visit from a Stranger" (S 5:Ep 5)	
1952	Ford Theatre: All Star Theatre		Episode: "Edge of the Law" (S 1:Ep 6)	
1953	Fireside Theatre		Episode: "The Return" (S 5: 19)	
1953	Schlitz Playhouse of Stars		Episodew: "The Devil's Other Name" (S 2:Ep 25)	
1953	Ford Theatre: All Star Theatre		Episode: "The Jewel" (S 1:Ep 35)	
1953	Hallmark Hall of Fame	Sarah McCoy	Episode: "McCoy of Abilene" (S 3:Ep 4)	
1953	Ramar of the Jungle	Lylia Webley	Episode: "Call to Danger" (S 2:Ep 6)	
1954	Ramar of the Jungle	Lylia Webley	Episode: "Blind Peril" (S 2:Ep 12)	
1954	Four Star Playhouse	Bessie	Episode: "Operation In Money" (S 2:Ep 25)	
1954	General Electric Theater	Millie	Episode: "That Other Sunlight" (S 2:Ep 17)	
1954	Schlitz Playhouse of Stars		Episode: "Her Kind of Honor" (S 3:Ep 29)	
1954	Hopalong Cassidy	Adele Keller	Episode: "Tricky Fingers" (S 2:Ep 26)	
1954	Fireside Theatre		Episode: "Trial Period" (S 6:Ep 35)	
1954	Cavalcade of America	Mrs. Field	Episode: "The Great Gamble" (S 3:Ep 2)	
1954	The Lone Wolf	Lori Race	Episode: "The Malibu Story (a.k.a. Malibu-Laguna)" (S 1:Ep 9)	
1954	Ford Theatre: All Star Theatre	Liz	Episode: "Shadow of Truth" (S 3:Ep 3)	
1954	Climax!		Episode: "Epitaph For a Spy" (S 1:Ep 8)	
1955	Cavalcade of America	Lee Powell Coleman	Episode: "Take Off Zero" (S 3:Ep 14)	
1955	Cavalcade of America		Episode: "Decision For Justice" (S 3:Ep 15)	
1955	The Lone Ranger	Clare Lee	Episode: "The Law Lady" (S 4:Ep 25)	
1955	Henry Fonda Presents the Star and the Story	Joan	Episode: "Newspaper Man" (S 1:Ep 19)	
1955	Loretta Young Show	Miss Cook	Episode: "A Shadow Between" (S 3:Ep 16)	
1956	TV Reader's Digest		Episode: "Lost, Strayed, and Lonely" (S 2:Ep 21)	
1956	Wire Service	Phyllis Holley	Episode: "Hideout" (S 1:Ep 3)	
1957	Zane Grey Theater	Amy Marr	Episode: "Decision At Wilson's Creek" (S 1:Ep 28); Rerun as Frontier Justice (S 1:Ep 6) in 1958 with the same episode title	
1957	Wagon Train	Mary Palmer	Episode: "The Willy Moran Story (Pilot)" (S 1:Ep 1)	
1957–64	The Danny Thomas Show	Kathy 'Clancey' O'Hara Williams	Main cast	
1958	The Ed Sullivan Show	Kathy Williams	Episode: "September 21, 1958: CBS's Stars of the 1958–59 TV season" (S 11:Ep 2)	
1958	Westinghouse Desilu Playhouse	Kathy Williams	Episode: "Lucy Makes Room for Danny" (S 1:Ep 9); Also listed under The Lucy–Desi Comedy Hour with the same episode title (S 2:Ep 2)	
1961	The Joey Bishop Show	Kathy Williams	Episode: "This Is Your Life" (S 1:Ep 4); A spin-off of The Danny Thomas Show	
1964	Special for Women: The Menace of Age	Ann Wells	Television movie	
1967	The Danny Thomas Hour	Kathy Williams	Episode: "Make More Room for Daddy" (S 1:Ep 9)	
1969	Love, American Style		Episode: "Love and the Single Couple" (S 1:Ep 13)	
1970–71	Make Room for Granddaddy	Kathy Williams	Main cast; Sequel to Make Room for Daddy (1953–1956); Make Room for Daddy changed its name to The Danny Thomas Show (1956–1964)	
1975	The Missing Are Deadly	Mrs. Robertson	Television movie directed by Don McDougall	
1978	Fantasy Island	Beth Shane	Episode: "Family Reunion / Voodoo" (S 1:Ep 4)	
1978	The Pirate	Mrs. Mason	Made-for-television film directed by Ken Annakin; Based on the novel with the same name written by Harold Robbins	
1980	The Love Boat	Martha Rogers	Episode: "April's Love/Happy Ending/We Three" (S 3:Ep 17)	
1987	Sweet Surrender	Joyce Holden	Main cast; Short-lived American sitcom	
1988	Side by Side	Mrs. Hammerstein	Television movie directed by Jack Bender	

=== Stage ===
Year	Title	Role	Theatre	Notes	Ref
1935	The Old Maid	Tina	Broadway	Replacement performer	
1945	Signature	Nora Davisson	Broadway	Original performer	
1946	Little Brown Jug	Carol Barlow	Broadway	Original performer	
1967	The Girl in the Freudian Slip	Paula Maugham	Broadway	Original performer	

== Bibliography ==
- A Dance and a Hug, by Marjorie Lord (2004)
