= Country Air (film) =

1933 film

- Directed by: Eugenio de Liguoro
- Written by: Erminio Macario; Eugenio de Liguoro
- Starring: Erminio Macario; Laura Adani
- Cinematography: Ferdinando Martini
- Edited by: Simon Gui
- Music by: Vittorio Mascheroni; Franco Silvestri
- Production company: Società Italiana Cines
- Distributed by: Cine Tirrenia
- Release date: 1933
- Running time: 66 minutes
- Country: Italy
- Language: Italian

Country Air (Italian:Aria di paese) is a 1933 Italian comedy film directed by Eugenio de Liguoro and starring Erminio Macario, Laura Adani and Evangelina Vitaliani. It marked the debut of Macario. An unemployed drifter takes a series of jobs, each one of which he quickly loses. He then goes to the countryside for a while where he falls in love with a woman.

== Cast ==
- Erminio Macario as il vagabondo
- Laura Adani as Maria
- Ernesto Maroni as Antonio
- Mario Siletti as custode
- Umberto Sacripante
- Evangelina Vitaliani as zia di Maria
- Lisalotte Smith

== Bibliography ==
- Moliterno, Gino. Historical Dictionary of Italian Cinema. Scarecrow Press, 2008.
