= Jessica Feshbach =

American scientologist (born 1975)

- Born: December 18, 1975 (age 50); United States
- Other names: Jessica Feshbach Rodriguez, Jessica Rodriguez; Jessica Paolo; Jessica Davis
- Education: The Delphian School
- Occupations: Scientology official, Member of Sea Org
- Years active: 1994–present
- Employer: David Miscavige
- Known for: Scientology spokesperson, Assistant to Katie Holmes
- Spouse: Tommy Davis (m. 2007; div. 2017)
- Parent(s): Joseph Feshbach, Lucinda Horn Feshbach
- Relatives: Melissa M Feshbach, Sarah Isabelle Feshbach, Kurt Feshbach

Jessica Feshbach, also known as Jessica Feshbach Rodriguez and Jessica Davis (born December 18, 1975), is an American former official within the Church of Scientology organization. The daughter of a family with a long tradition in Scientology, she attended The Delphian School in Yamhill County, Oregon, a Scientology school.

At age 19, Feshbach joined the Church of Scientology's Sea Org, a group described by the organization as occupying "the most essential and trusted positions in the senior churches in the Scientology hierarchy". She was characterized in 2005 by MSNBC as a "Senior Scientologist", and by Fox News Channel as "a high-level Scientologist"; in 2006 MSNBC described her as "a high-level Scientology practitioner and member of the church's influential Feshbach family".

Feshbach is most well known for her stint as Tom Cruise's assistant, and for her friendship with Katie Holmes during the couple's engagement. In this role she traveled with Holmes during publicity for the actresses's film roles, sat in on interviews, and responded to questions about Holmes from journalists. Warner Bros. made special accommodations for Feshbach to accompany Holmes during promotion of Batman Begins, and she attended Holmes' wedding to Cruise in Italy in 2006. Feshbach was later a guest of honor at Scientology's Patron Ball, held at the organization's headquarters in Britain. By 2009, Feshbach had become a high-ranking spokesperson for the Scientology organization.

== Early life and family ==
Born on December 18, 1975, Feshbach comes from an influential family within Scientology. She is a devoted member of the organization, and her family, having given millions of dollars to the organization, are one of the most significant donors to Scientology. Her mother is Lucinda Horn Feshbach and her father was Joseph Feshbach, an investor in Palo Alto, California; he was profiled in a 1991 article about Scientology in Time magazine. Feshbach has a twin sister, Melissa, and an older brother Kurt. As of 2005, her aunt was the manager of a Florida-based Scientology center.

Along with two brothers, Joseph Feshbach worked out of facilities in California and Clearwater, Florida. The Feshbachs are noteworthy for gaining wealth through the process of short selling companies on the stock market. The brothers are all devout adherents to Scientology. Some critics question their short-selling methods.

Feshbach attended elementary education at the Delphian School, a private Scientology boarding school. The Delphian School is located in Sheridan, Oregon, and delivers instruction to grades K-12. In 2005, Feshbach began going by the name Rodriguez, her second husband.

== Scientology official ==
=== Sea Org ===
In 1994, Feshbach joined the Sea Org, a division within the organization. 3 News characterized the Sea Org as "Scientology's senior management". In their book Cults and New Religions, Douglas E. Cowan and David G. Bromley wrote, "Described by the Church as 'a fraternal religious order,' members of the Sea Org 'occupy the most essential and trusted positions in the senior churches in the Scientology hierarchy'." The Sea Org has been described as a paramilitary organization and as a private naval force, having operated several vessels in its past and displaying a maritime tradition. Some ex-members and scholars have described the Sea Org as a totalitarian organization marked by intensive surveillance and a lack of freedom. Rolling Stone notes, "Sea Org members staff all of the senior ecclesiastic positions in the church hierarchy". As of 2010, there were 5,000 members in the Sea Org. Feshbach told the Associated Press, "When you sign up as a Sea Org member, you're signing up as a member of a religious order. You're a volunteer. You sign a contract that says, 'I'm not going to be paid minimum wage and I know that.'"

As part of her ascent within the church's hierarchy, Feshbach completed multiple paid Scientology courses including "Security Checker Internship," "False Purpose Rundown Auditorship" and "Clear Certainty". In 2005, MSNBC characterized Feshbach as a "Senior Scientologist", and Fox News Channel called her "a high-level Scientologist" within the organization. In 2006, MSNBC described Feshbach as "a high-level Scientology practitioner and member of the church's influential Feshbach family".

=== Assistant to Cruise and Holmes ===
Feshbach soon began working as an assistant to Scientologist actor Tom Cruise. In April 2005, she transferred from her Sea Org duties to serve as a personal "handler" to his then-fiancée, Katie Holmes. Soon after beginning her relationship with Cruise, Holmes fired her long-time manager and agent, and Feshbach became her new "best friend". Feshbach tutored Holmes in Scientology methodologies, traveled with Holmes when the actress was interviewed during publicity events.

In one cover story for W, journalist Robert Haskell wrote that Feshbach "was described to me as Holmes's 'Scientology chaperone' and it was clear that she would be on hand during our interview despite my protests." Holmes simply characterized Feshbach as her best friend, and Feshbach said the same. During the interview, however, Feshbach intervened multiple times to answer questions posed to Holmes.

Feshbach additionally accompanied Holmes to promote her film Batman Begins. Warner Bros., the studio that distributed the film, released a statement to New York Daily News that denied reported friction with Feshbach: "There's no discord between us and Jessica. We, in fact, made Jessica's hotel reservations for her and brought her along on our plane. If she's someone Katie wants to travel with, that's fine. The people who made the tour made every effort to accommodate her. It's a very amicable situation." Later that year, along with Cruise and Holmes, Feshbach was a guest of honor at the Patron Ball, a Scientology event held at Saint Hill Manor, the organization's British headquarters. In 2006, Feshbach attended Holmes' wedding to Cruise in Italy.

=== Organization spokesperson ===
By 2009, Feshbach had become a public spokesperson for Scientology; she continued to serve in this capacity in 2010.

Feshbach and Scientology official Tommy Davis held a meeting on February 27, 2009, in Burbank, California with actor Larry Anderson. Anderson, who had previously starred in the Scientology introduction film Orientation, asked Feshbach and Davis to give back money he had donated to the Scientology organization. Anderson recorded the 90-minute discussion and it was made public by the St. Petersburg Times.

=== Life After Leaving Sea Org ===
In 2009, Feshbach married Scientology executive Tommy Davis in a small private ceremony. The pair divorced in 2018. They have two children.

Feshbach acquired a Texas realtor's license in July 2013 and worked as a realtor in Austin, Texas before moving to California.

== See also ==
- Gold Base
- Office of Special Affairs
- Scientology and celebrities
