= Laura Adani =

Italian actress (1913–1996)

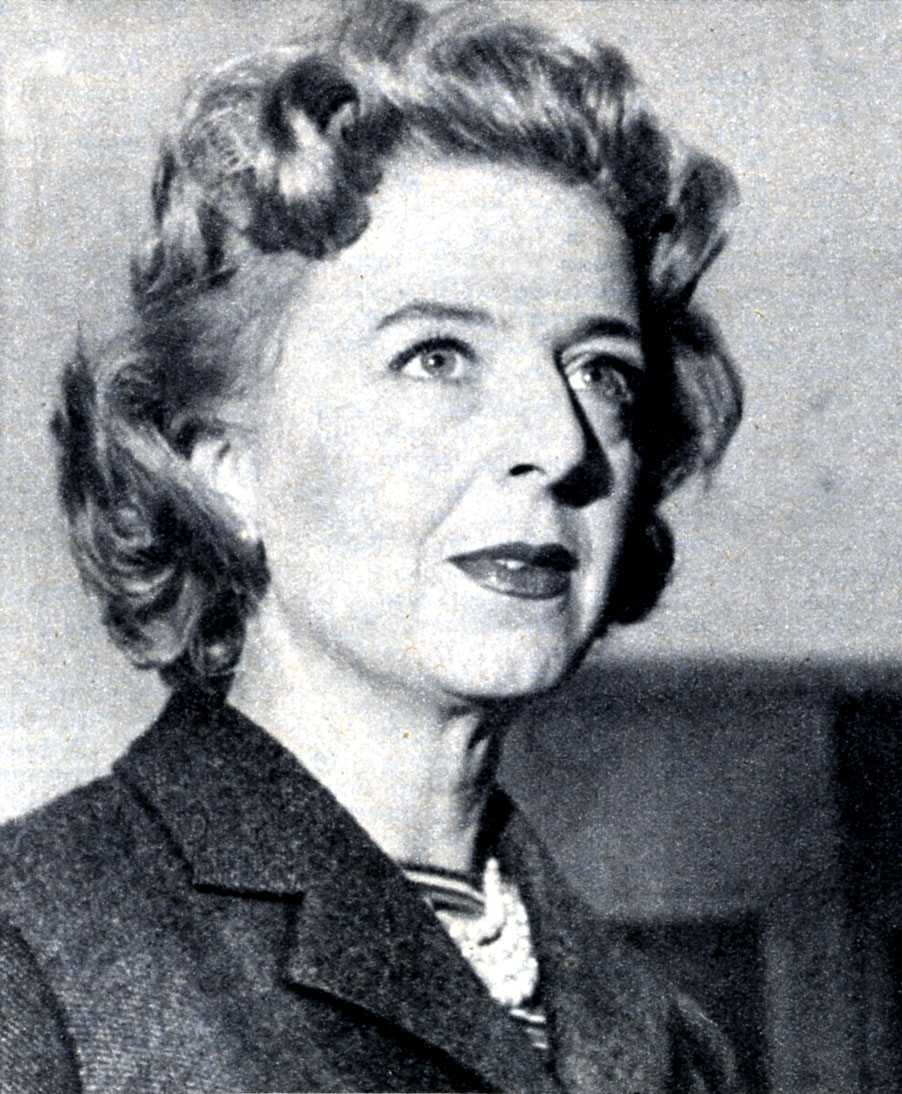
- Adani in 1958
- Born: 7 October 1913; Modena, Italy
- Died: 30 August 1996 (aged 82); Moncalieri, Italy
- Occupation: Actress

Laura Adani (7 October 1913 – 30 August 1996) was an Italian actress. She appeared in 13 films between 1933 and 1980.

She was born in Modena, Emilia-Romagna, and died in Moncalieri, Piedmont.

== Filmography ==
Year	Title	Role	Notes
1933	Il treno delle 21,15	Viaggiatrice bionda	
1933	Country Air	Maria	
1939	Torna, caro ideal!	Maria Vernowska	
1941	Orizzonte dipinto	Regina	
1943	L'amico delle donne	Elena Hackendorf	
1959	You're on Your Own	Maria Armentano, moglie di Peppino	
1960	Vento del Sud	Baronessa	
1962	Le massaggiatrici	Mrs. Parodi	
1969	Help Me, My Love	Elena	
1970	Borsalino	Mme Siffredi, la mère de Roch	
1980	Il lupo e l'agnello	Fanny	(final film role)
