= Anne Archer =

American actress (born 1947)

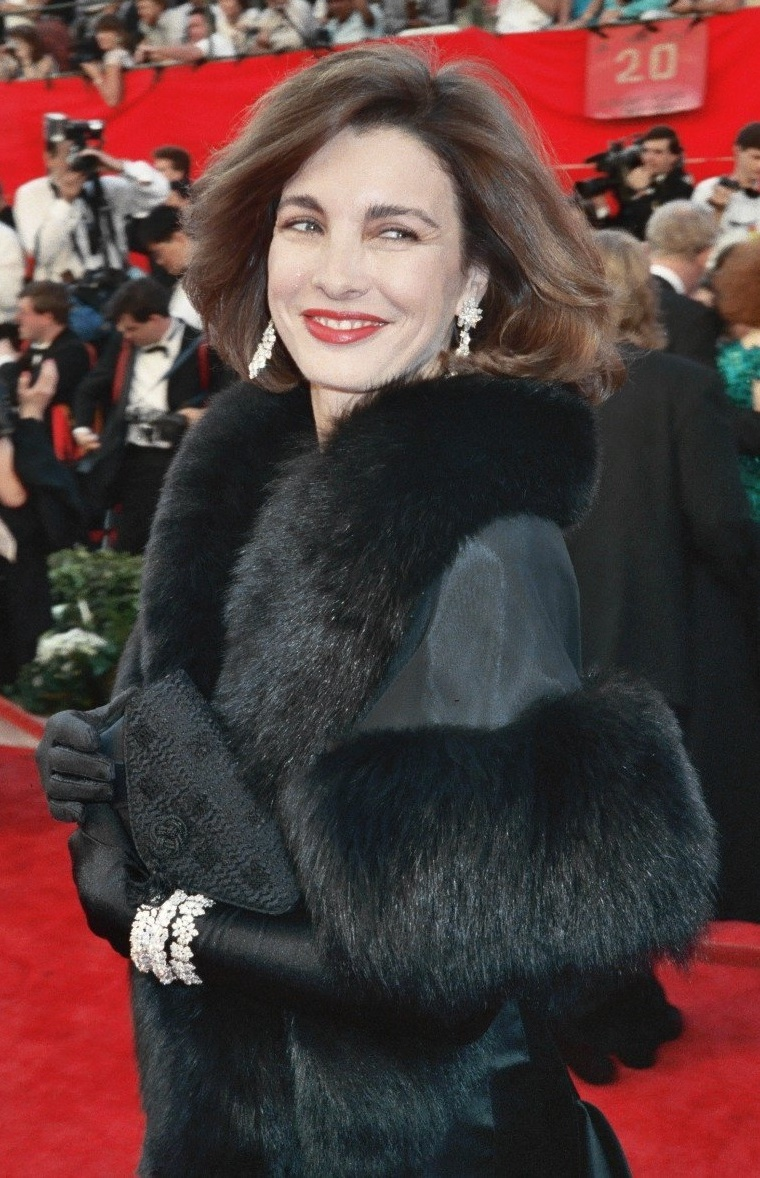
- Archer in 1989
- Born: August 24, 1947 (age 79); Los Angeles, California, U.S.
- Education: Pitzer College
- Occupation: Actress
- Years active: 1968–present
- Spouses: William Davis (m. 1969; div. 1977); Terry Jastrow (m. 1979)
- Children: 2, including Tommy Davis
- Parents: John Archer (father); Marjorie Lord (mother)

Anne Archer (born August 24, 1947) is an American actress. Archer was named Miss Golden Globe in 1971, and in the year following, appeared in her feature-film debut The Honkers (1972). She had supporting roles in Cancel My Reservation (1972), The All-American Boy (1973), and Trackdown (1976), and appeared in Good Guys Wear Black (1978), Paradise Alley (1978), and Hero at Large (1980).

For her role as Beth in the thriller film Fatal Attraction (1987), Archer was nominated for the Academy Award, BAFTA Award, and Golden Globe Award for Best Supporting Actress. Her role in Robert Altman's Short Cuts (1993) won her a Golden Globe Award and a Volpi Cup. She also appeared in Paradise Alley (1978), Raise the Titanic (1980), Patriot Games (1992), and Clear and Present Danger (1994).

Since the 2000s, Archer has sporadically worked in acting. She appeared in the film Lullaby (2014) and made her stage debut as Mrs. Robinson in the West End production of The Graduate in 2001. She played the eponymous actress in The Trial of Jane Fonda at the 2014 Edinburgh Festival Fringe, and had recurring roles on television shows such as Boston Public (2003), It's Always Sunny in Philadelphia (2006), and Ghost Whisperer (2006–2008).

== Early life ==
Archer was born in Los Angeles, the daughter of actors John Archer and Marjorie Lord. She graduated from Pitzer College in Claremont, California, in 1968.

Archer married William Davis in 1969. They had one son, Thomas William "Tommy" Davis, born on August 18, 1972. The couple divorced in 1977. She married Terry Jastrow in 1979. They have one son together, Jeffrey Tucker Jastrow, born on October 18, 1984. She was originally a Christian Scientist, but she and her husband have been members of the Church of Scientology since 1975. Archer's stepfather was Los Angeles banker and philanthropist Harry Volk.

Between 1982 and 1986, she was a spokeswoman for Applied Scholastics, the literacy training organization sponsored by the Church of Scientology. Her son Tommy was the head of the Church of Scientology's Celebrity Centre International in Los Angeles. In 1991, Archer spoke publicly about her abortion in the book The Choices We Made: Twenty-Five Women and Men Speak Out About Abortion.

== Career ==
Archer began her career after graduating from college. She appeared as Ramona in the "Ramona Pageant" in Hemet, California, before moving to New York City. In the 1970s, she appeared in television series, including Hawaii Five-O, The Mod Squad, Ironside, and Little House on the Prairie. She also was a regular cast member on the short-lived ABC sitcom Bob & Carol & Ted & Alice in 1973. She was named Miss Golden Globe in 1971.

Her first feature film was 1972 comedy The Honkers co-starring opposite James Coburn and Lois Nettleton. She later had supporting roles in Cancel My Reservation (1972), The All-American Boy (1973), and Trackdown (1976). In 1976, she had a female leading role in the drama film Lifeguard starring alongside Sam Elliott. She auditioned for the role of Lois Lane in the 1978 superhero film Superman, a role eventually awarded to Margot Kidder. Archer continued to appear in feature films, including Good Guys Wear Black (1978) starring Chuck Norris, Paradise Alley (1978) opposite Sylvester Stallone, and Hero at Large (1980), co-starring John Ritter.

In early 1980s, Archer appeared in several smaller and made-for-television movies. In 1983, she moved to television with a leading role in the short-lived NBC drama series The Family Tree, playing a divorced woman with three children. In 1985, she joined the cast of CBS primetime soap opera Falcon Crest, playing manipulative businesswoman Cassandra Wilder for one year. In 1987, she starred alongside Michael Douglas and Glenn Close in the psychological thriller film Fatal Attraction. The film became a huge box-office success, and Archer was nominated for a BAFTA, Golden Globe, and Academy Award for Best Supporting Actress for her role as Beth Gallagher.

In 1990, she had leading roles in three movies: Love at Large alongside Tom Berenger, Narrow Margin, and Eminent Domain. She starred alongside Harrison Ford in the 1992 spy thriller film Patriot Games and its sequel Clear and Present Danger (1994). In 1993, she starred opposite Madonna and Willem Dafoe in the erotic thriller Body of Evidence; the film was widely panned and at the 14th Golden Raspberry Awards, Archer received nomination for Worst Supporting Actress. Later that year, she starred in the Robert Altman ensemble comedy-drama film Short Cuts, which received a special Golden Globe Award and Venice Film Festival Special Volpi Cup.

In 2000, Archer co-starred in the war film Rules of Engagement and the action film The Art of War. Her other notable film credits include Man of the House (2005) opposite Tommy Lee Jones, Ghosts of Girlfriends Past (2009; also featured her former Fatal Attraction co-star Michael Douglas, although they shared no scenes together), and Lullaby (2014). In 2001, Archer portrayed Mrs. Robinson at the Gielgud Theatre in a West End production of The Graduate.

In 2014 and 2016, she played Jane Fonda in the premiere production of the play The Trial of Jane Fonda, at the Edinburgh Festival Fringe. Also in 2000s, she had recurring roles on several television shows such as Boston Public, It's Always Sunny in Philadelphia, and Ghost Whisperer. From 2008 to 2009, she starred in the short-lived CW comedy-drama Privileged.

== Filmography ==
=== Film ===
| Year | Title | Role | Notes |
|---|---|---|---|
| 1972 | The Honkers | Deborah Moon | |
| 1972 | Cancel My Reservation | Crazy Hollister | |
| 1973 | The All-American Boy | Drenna Valentine | Filmed in 1970 |
| 1976 | Trackdown | Barbara | |
| 1976 | Lifeguard | Cathy | |
| 1978 | Good Guys Wear Black | Margaret | |
| 1978 | Paradise Alley | Annie O'Sherlock | |
| 1980 | Hero at Large | Jolene Marsh | |
| 1980 | Raise the Titanic | Dana Archibald | |
| 1981 | Green Ice | Lillian Holbrook | |
| 1982 | Waltz Across Texas | Gail Weston | |
| 1984 | The Naked Face | Ann Blake | |
| 1985 | Too Scared to Scream | Kate Bridges | Filmed in 1982 |
| 1986 | The Check is in the Mail... | Peggy Jackson | |
| 1987 | Fatal Attraction | Beth Gallagher | Nominated—Academy Award for Best Supporting Actress; Nominated—BAFTA Award for Best Actress in a Supporting Role; Nominated—Golden Globe Award for Best Supporting Actress – Motion Picture |
| 1990 | Love at Large | Miss Dolan | |
| 1990 | Narrow Margin | Carol Hunnicut | |
| 1990 | Eminent Domain | Mira Borski | |
| 1992 | Patriot Games | Cathy Ryan | |
| 1993 | Body of Evidence | Joanne Braslow | |
| 1993 | Family Prayers | Rita Jacobs | |
| 1993 | Short Cuts | Claire Kane | Golden Globe Special Ensemble Cast Award (non-competitive); Volpi Cup for Best Ensemble Cast |
| 1994 | Clear and Present Danger | Cathy Muller Ryan | |
| 1994 | There Goes My Baby | Narrator (voice) | |
| 1996 | Mojave Moon | Julie Rigby | |
| 1998 | Nico the Unicorn | Julie Hastings | |
| 2000 | Innocents | Beryl Denright | |
| 2000 | Whispers: An Elephant's Tale | Gentle Heart | Voice |
| 2000 | Rules of Engagement | Mrs. Mourain | |
| 2000 | The Art of War | Eleanor Hooks | |
| 2002 | The Gray in Between | Ursula | |
| 2003 | Uncle Nino | Marie Micelli | |
| 2004 | November | Carol Jacobs | |
| 2005 | Man of the House | Prof. Molly McCarthy | |
| 2005 | The Iris Effect | Sarah Hathaway | |
| 2006 | Cut Off | Louise | |
| 2006 | End Game | The First Lady | |
| 2008 | Felon | Maggie | |
| 2009 | Ghosts of Girlfriends Past | Vonda Volkom | |
| 2010 | Quantum Quest: A Cassini Space Odyssey | Gal 2000 (voice) | |
| 2014 | Lullaby | Rachel | |
| 2017 | Trafficked | Mother Monica | |

=== Television films ===
| Year | Title | Role | Notes |
|---|---|---|---|
| 1973 | The Blue Knight | Laila | |
| 1974 | The Mark of Zorro | Teresa | |
| 1975 | The Log of the Black Pearl | Lila Bristol | |
| 1975 | A Matter of Wife... and Death | Carol | |
| 1976 | The Dark Side of Innocence | Nora Hancock Mulligan | |
| 1978 | The Pirate | Jordana Mason | |
| 1984 | The Sky's No Limit | Dr. Susan Keith Browning | |
| 1987 | A Different Affair | —N/a | |
| 1988 | Leap of Faith | Debby Franke Ogg | |
| 1992 | The Last of His Tribe | Henriette Kroeber | |
| 1992 | Nails | Mary Niles | |
| 1994 | Jane's House | Mary Parker | |
| 1994 | Because Mommy Works | Abby | |
| 1995 | The Man in the Attic | Krista Heldmann | |
| 1996 | Jake's Women | Maggie | |
| 1998 | Indiscretion of an American Wife | Julia Burton | |
| 1998 | My Husband's Secret Life | Theresa "Sissy" Sullivan | |
| 2002 | Night of the Wolf | Claire McNichol | |
| 2007 | Judicial Indiscretion | Monica Barrett | |
| 2008 | Family Practice | Helena Kinglare | |

=== Television series ===
| Year | Title | Role | Notes |
|---|---|---|---|
| 1970 | Men at Law | Annette Porter | Episode: "Shadows of Doubt" |
| 1970 | Hawaii Five-0 | Jane Michaels | Episode: "Beautiful Screamer" |
| 1971 | The F.B.I. | Lynne Ashton | Episode: "Downfall" |
| 1971 | The Mod Squad | Jennifer | Episode: "Color of Laughter, Color of Tears" |
| 1971 | Ironside | Myra St. John | Episode: "Murder Impromptu" |
| 1971 | Alias Smith and Jones | Ellen Lewis | Episode: "Shootout at Diablo Station" |
| 1971 | Love, American Style | Louise | Segment: "Love and the Fountain of Youth" |
| 1972 | The Sixth Sense | Elizabeth Danbury | Episode: "Can a Dead Man Strike from the Grave?" |
| 1973 | Mannix | Anne Avery | Episode: "A Problem of Innocence" |
| 1973 | Bob & Carol & Ted & Alice | Carol Sanders | 12 episodes |
| 1974 | Harry O | Sharon Dempsey | Episode: "Guardian at the Gates" |
| 1975 | Little House on the Prairie | Kate Thorvald | Episode: "Doctor's Lady" |
| 1975 | Petrocelli | Sherril Brewster | Episode: "Shadow of Fear" |
| 1975–1976 | Switch | Laurie | 3 episodes |
| 1976 | McCloud | Wilhelmina Kirk | Episode: "Our Man in the Harem" |
| 1976 | Harry O | Felicia Applequist | Episode: "The Mysterious Case of Lester and Dr. Fong" |
| 1977 | Seventh Avenue | Myrna Gold | 3 episodes |
| 1983 | The Family Tree | Annie Benjamin Nichols | 6 episodes |
| 1985 | Falcon Crest | Cassandra Wilder | 22 episodes |
| 1994 | Leslie's Folly | Leslie | TV short |
| 1995 | Present Tense, Past Perfect | Kate | TV short |
| 1999 | Camino de Santiago | Isabelle Derek | 3 episodes |
| 2000 | Beggars and Choosers | Beverly Boyden | Episode: "Moles, Meatloaf, and Myrna Loy" |
| 2003 | Boston Public | Patricia Emerson | 3 episodes |
| 2004 | The L Word | Lenore Pieszecki | 3 episodes |
| 2006; 2025 | It's Always Sunny in Philadelphia | Barbara Reynolds | Season 2, Episode 2: "The Gang Goes Jihad" Season 2, Episode 7: "Mac Bangs Dennis’ Mom" Season 3, Episode 4: "Dennis and Dee’s Mom Is Dead" Season 17, Episode 8: "The Golden Bachelor Live"; Archive footage |
| 2006–2008 | Ghost Whisperer | Beth Gordon | 4 episodes |
| 2008–2009 | Privileged | Laurel Limoges | 13 episodes |
| 2016 | The Grinder | Lenore | Episode: "For the People" |
| 2016 | Law & Order: Special Victims Unit | Trudy Morris | Episode: "Mama" |
| 2022 | The Dropout | Charlotte Shultz | Miniseries |

== Awards and nominations ==
| Year | Award | Category | Nominated work | Result |
|---|---|---|---|---|
| 1974 | 53rd Photoplay Awards | New Female Star | —N/a | Nominated |
| 1988 | 45th Golden Globe Awards | Best Supporting Actress | Fatal Attraction | Nominated |
| 1988 | 60th Academy Awards | Best Supporting Actress | Fatal Attraction | Nominated |
| 1989 | 42nd British Academy Film Awards | Best Actress in a Supporting Role | Fatal Attraction | Nominated |
| 1993 | 50th Venice International Film Festival | Special Volpi Cup for Best Ensemble Cast | Short Cuts | Won |
| 1994 | 51st Golden Globe Awards | Special Award for Ensemble | Short Cuts | Won |
| 1994 | 14th Golden Raspberry Awards | Worst Supporting Actress | Body of Evidence | Nominated |
| 2017 | 18th Women's Image Network Awards | Humanitarian Award | —N/a | Honored |
