= Scientology and Me =

- Opening title
- Created by: Panorama · John Sweeney
- Presented by: Jeremy Vine · John Sweeney
- Country of origin: United Kingdom

Production
- Editor: Damian Leask
- Running time: 30 minutes

Original release
- Network: BBC One
- Release: 14 May 2007

Scientology and Me is a television documentary first broadcast on 14 May 2007 as part of the BBC's Panorama series. In it, reporter John Sweeney visited the United States to investigate whether the Church of Scientology was becoming more mainstream. The programme gained particular controversy before and during filming due to unresolved differences on content and approach between Sweeney's production team and Scientology members. Tommy Davis, the international spokesperson for Scientology, did not want the BBC to interview any detractors or perceived enemies of the Church (Note: Use of "Church" or "the Church" is a common shortened form of "Church of Scientology"; see The Church (Scientology).) or include them in the documentary, and attempted to censor any references to Scientology as a "cult."

The scale of the controversy intensified when the Church of Scientology released a 40-second clip of video footage showing a screaming argument between John Sweeney and Church spokesman Tommy Davis over the way in which Sweeney was interviewing critics of Scientology. In the clip, Sweeney yells: "You were not there at the beginning of that interview! You were not there! You did not hear or record all the interview! You are quoting the second half of the interview, not the first half! You cannot assert what you're saying!" at Davis in reference to an interview Sweeney recorded with Scientology critic Shawn Lonsdale. Despite the Church of Scientology's lobbying British MPs to have the documentary scrapped, its first airing went ahead on 14 May. With a peak of 4.9 million viewers in the UK, the episode garnered the highest ratings for Panorama since September the previous year.

== Content ==
The documentary was intended as an investigation of the claims of both critics of the Church of Scientology and the Church itself to see if the Church "still deserved its sinister reputation." In the introduction, Sweeney outlines his investigation into the reputation of the Church of Scientology, its affiliated celebrities and its current activities. He begins with an edited version of a statement issued during the 1994 Los Angeles Superior Court case Church of Scientology of California vs Gerald Armstrong, in which Judge John Breckenridge describes the Church of Scientology as "[s]chizophrenic, bizarre, ... paranoid[;] ... an organization that harasses its enemies ... and abuses the trust of its members." Sweeney notes that the case has been derided by the Church of Scientology as it believes it was based upon discredited evidence.

In describing the affiliated celebrity members of Scientology, the documentary refers to them as an "all-star cast list." John Travolta is seen crediting the longevity of his career and demise of other people's careers as due to the influence or lack of influence of Dianetics. The documentary moves on to an interview in which Sweeney talks with a mother, known as "Sharon," who had been "disconnected" from her daughter after her daughter had taken a weekend away with other Scientologists and had read several books which she claimed had changed her life. Sweeney then explains the concept of a "disconnection" within the context of Scientology doctrine. "To the church, Sharon was a negative influence. Her daughter wrote to her cutting all ties. It's what Scientology call a 'disconnect.' They say they bring families together and a disconnect is a rare last resort and a human right."

== Reactions ==
=== Outburst controversy ===
On 10 May 2007, four days before the documentary's first networked airing, video footage filmed by the Church of Scientology was released on YouTube and DVD showing Sweeney's outburst towards Scientology representative Tommy Davis. The Church of Scientology also presented the BBC with what it claims are 154 breaches of BBC guidelines by Sweeney and his team, though Sandy Smith, the programme's producer, responded that "[t]he head of current affairs, George Entwistle, has viewed all footage complained of and, with the exception of the point when Sweeney shouts, he found nothing that stood outside BBC guidelines." The BBC responded to the clip by releasing on its website the video Sweeney shot to give some context to the argument before the documentary was aired. Since a description of Sweeney's losing his temper was included in TV guide listings for the documentary, the BBC already knew about Sweeney's outburst before the YouTube clip was uploaded.

Scientologists also later complained of bigotry towards the Church in comments made by Sweeney during interviews with Scientology members. Sweeney's outburst toward Tommy Davis prompted John Travolta to lobby British MPs in an attempt to stop the documentary from being aired. Both Sweeney and Sandy Smith apologised for his (Sweeney's) behaviour. Sweeney stated that it was a by-product of the "hijacking of the Holocaust" by the Scientology exhibition Psychiatry: An Industry of Death—which was where the outburst occurred—as well as attempts to control his mind. Sweeney said of the incident: "I apologised almost immediately, Tommy carried on as if nothing had happened but meanwhile Scientology had rushed off copies of me losing it to my boss, my boss's boss and my boss's boss's boss, the Director-General of the BBC." Later, he added: "I look like an exploding tomato and shout like a jet engine and every time I see it, it makes me cringe." At the time the Church of Scientology posted its own material regarding the matter on the Internet, one of its spokesmen denied Sweeney's statement regarding a quick apology.

=== Anti-documentary activity by Scientology ===
Sweeney said of fair gaming: "While making our BBC Panorama film Scientology and Me I have been shouted at, spied on, had my hotel invaded at midnight, denounced as a 'bigot' by star Scientologists and been chased round the streets of Los Angeles by sinister strangers." Sweeney also claimed that his family and neighbours had been harassed by unidentified strangers back in the UK, including an intruder at his wedding who fled when confronted.

Former high-ranking Scientologist and spokesperson Mike Rinder claimed David Miscavige was unhappy with the Church's handling of the documentary, and punished Rinder by exiling him to the United Kingdom to dig ditches. As a result, he left the Church in 2007. In 2009, he has subsequently spoken out against the Church, and now said he lied to Sweeney during the interviewing to defend the Church.

The Church also created a documentary regarding the BBC's activities called 'Panorama Exposed', showcasing many of the Panorama team's alleged violations of BBC and government broadcast codes.

On 28 September 2010, Rinder and Amy Scobee were featured on The Secrets of Scientology, a follow-up to the 2007 broadcast. Rinder revealed that Sweeney was correct: Scientology was following Sweeney's activities for the 2007 report.

== See also ==
- The Secrets of Scientology
- Shawn Lonsdale
- Scientology in the United Kingdom
