= Stop That Cab =

1951 American film

- Directed by: Eugenio de Liguoro
- Written by: Walter Abbott; Louella MacFarlane
- Produced by: Sigmund Neufeld; Abrasha Haimson
- Starring: Sid Melton; Iris Adrian; Marjorie Lord
- Cinematography: Carl Berger
- Edited by: Michael Luciano
- Music by: John Sentesi
- Production company: Spartan Productions
- Distributed by: Lippert Pictures
- Release date: March 30, 1951
- Running time: 58 minutes
- Country: United States
- Language: English

Stop That Cab is a 1951 American comedy film directed by Eugenio de Liguoro and starring Sid Melton, Iris Adrian and Marjorie Lord. It was produced as a second feature and distributed by Lippert Pictures.

== Plot ==
A cab driver works the night shift and must deal with an assortment of crazy people, hard cases and sob stories. At home, he faces a loud, argumentative wife.

== Cast ==
- Sid Melton as Sidney Gugenheimer
- Iris Adrian as Lucy
- Marjorie Lord as Mary Thomas
- Tom Neal as Lefty
- William Haade as Onslow
- Greg McClure as George
- Chester Clute as Lucy's Father
- Minerva Urecal as Lucy's Mother
- Mario Siletti as Giuseppe Moscadella
- Renata Vanni as Josephine Moscadella
- Jess Kirkpatrick as Newsboy
- Montgomery Rutherford Hughes as the USC Student
