= Harry Volk =

American banker

- Born: July 20, 1905; Trenton, New Jersey
- Died: May 12, 2000 (aged 94); Los Angeles, California
- Education: Rutgers College (AB 1927, LLB 1930)
- Occupation: Banker
- Years active: 1927-1980
- Known for: president of the Union Bank of California
- Spouses: Marion Elisabeth Waters (m. 1931) Marjorie Lord (m. 1976)

Harry Joseph Volk (July 20, 1905 – May 12, 2000) was an American banker and insurance man who was the president and then chairman of Union Bank of California.

Volk joined the Prudential Insurance Company in 1927, and in 1947 was appointed vice-president in charge of the company's western operations. In 1957, Volk left Prudential to become the president of the Union Bank of California. He remained president until 1969, when he was elected chairman of the bank's holding company, the Union Bancorp, and was elected chairman of the bank itself in 1974. Volk retired in 1980.

== Early life and education ==
Harry Volk grew up in Trenton, New Jersey, and attended Rutgers College, where he obtained a bachelor's degree in 1927 and a law degree in 1930.

== Career ==
He joined Prudential Insurance Company in 1930 as a vice president and, as senior vice president, created the company's first regional home office in Los Angeles, California, in 1947. He helped mastermind Prudential's decentralization and originated the family policy, a life insurance innovation.

Because of his work with Prudential, which included instigating the return of unclaimed funds to beneficiaries, Volk was recruited as chairman and chief executive officer of Union Bank of California in 1957. Volk was considered a banking pioneer. He helped bring about new offerings like daily compounding of interest and banking by mail, which were radical for the time. It was Volk, a trained lawyer, who spotted the loophole in federal laws that made it possible for banks to form holding companies, and in 1967 he established the country's first one-bank holding company, Union Bancorp Inc. He also had a knack for spotting executive talent, hiring such individuals as Carl E. Reichardt, later the highly-successful CEO of Wells Fargo Bank, and Donald Prell, a visionary venture capitalist who was responsible for producing Union Bank's first and only 30-year Strategic Plan.

In the turbulent economic times of the 1970s, Volk and Union Bank had their setbacks. He took Union into insurance and mortgage banking, only to have California regulators insist that it pull out of those enterprises in 1975. The bank never quite regained its vibrant growth. Many of its higher-level executives departed, and a significant number of the bank's business customers followed them to their new employers. During the bleak days of the mid-1970s, as banks began to fail, Volk managed reductions in staff through attrition, telling a reporter: “There were no wholesale firings. We simply adjusted our staff to the workload.” Union Bank was taken over by Standard Chartered Bank of London in 1979. Volk retired a year later.

While still at Prudential, Volk was asked to head a Los Angeles citizens committee to resolve disputes involving the United Way fund-raising campaign and its recipient charities. Volk set up what he called Associated In-Group Donors, an innovative system for voluntary contributions by employees through payroll withholding. It has now become the standard for nonprofit fund-raising organizations. With that, he persuaded United Way to accept policies for collecting and distributing donations, including a “donor choice” option directing how a contribution could be allotted.

Volk was a prime mover in rebuilding Los Angeles's historic Bunker Hill district. He helped found many cultural institutions, including the Music Center and the Los Angeles County Museum of Art.

After he retired from Union Bank in 1980, he became head of the Weingart Foundation, a California charitable organization with $155 million in assets established by a longtime banking customer of Volk, Ben Weingart. By the time Volk retired from the foundation in 1993, its assets had increased to more than $500 million.

== Personal life ==
Volk's wife of 41 years, Marion, died in 1972. He was survived by his second wife, actress Marjorie Lord, who died in 2015. Lord was best known for playing the role of Kathy, the second wife of Danny Thomas, on the long-running television series, The Danny Thomas Show. Volk's stepdaughter is the actress Anne Archer.
