= John Sweeney (journalist) =

British investigative journalist and writer (born 1958)

- Sweeney in 2024
- Born: John Paul Sweeney; 7 June 1958 (age 68); Saint Helier, Jersey
- Education: Barton Peveril Grammar School
- Alma mater: London School of Economics
- Occupations: Journalist, writer
- Years active: 1996–
- Political party: Liberal Democrats
- Website: johnsweeney.co.uk

John Paul Sweeney (born 7 June 1958) is an English investigative journalist and writer. He worked for The Observer newspaper, and the BBC's Panorama and Newsnight series. Sweeney ceased working for the BBC in October 2019.

== Education ==
Sweeney was educated at Barton Peveril Grammar School, a state grammar school in Eastleigh, Hampshire, followed by the London School of Economics.

== Investigative journalism ==
=== Barclay brothers suit ===
In 1996, Sweeney was sued for criminal defamation in France by the Barclay brothers, owners of The Daily Telegraph, but the claimants lost their case. At the time, Sweeney worked for the rival newspaper The Observer, and had given an interview on BBC Radio Guernsey alleging that they had been involved in corruption. The claimants justified their legal claim in the French courts on the basis that the broadcast could also be heard in a small coastal part of northern France, although this was widely considered forum shopping. Sweeney was ordered to pay €3,000 by the appeal court in Rennes, France.

== Career at the BBC ==
Sweeney appeared on the BBC arts programme, The Late Show when he filmed behind the scenes footage of the campaign of the 1992 general election.

Sweeney worked at the BBC from 2001 to 2014 as a staff reporter for flagship news programme Panorama, but subsequently continued to be involved in producing BBC Panorama programmes.

Sweeney ceased working for the BBC in October 2019. Shortly before his departure, the Press Gazette reported that "[Sweeney] was secretly filmed speaking with a source over drinks who turned out to be an ally of [Tommy] Robinson". Panorama later apologised on Sweeney's behalf for "offensive and inappropriate" comments made during the encounter. After leaving, Sweeney made a complaint to Ofcom and MPs about seven investigations for Newsnight, Panorama and BBC News that were not broadcast, some relating to links to Russia among people working within British politics, which he said was part of a "pattern of timidity" at the BBC. Later BuzzFeed News reported that four BBC sources had told them that two matters had led to Sweeney leaving: the Tommy Robinson investigation and a HR complaint made by a young BBC journalist deeply offended by a comment from Sweeney.

=== Zimbabwe ===
After formally joining the BBC in 2001, Sweeney reported on mass graves in Robert Mugabe's Zimbabwe for the BBC in 2002. By then Mugabe had banned BBC reporters from the country, forcing Sweeney to hide in a car boot to travel to a meeting with the leader of the opposition.

=== Cot death investigation ===
Sweeney spent four years investigating the cases of Sally Clark, Angela Cannings and Donna Anthony, three women who had been falsely imprisoned for killing their children. Sweeney's investigation helped to clear their names, and led to Roy Meadow, the expert witness whose testimony had proved decisive in their convictions, being temporarily struck off the General Medical Council's medical register. Sweeney received the Paul Foot Award in 2005 in recognition of his work.

=== Investigative report on Scientology ===
"Scientology and Me", a Panorama investigation into Scientology written and presented by Sweeney, was aired on BBC One on Monday, 14 May 2007. Prior to its airing, video footage filmed by the Church of Scientology was released on YouTube and on DVD that showed Sweeney shouting at Scientology representative Tommy Davis during a visit to the Citizens Commission on Human Rights's exhibition "Psychiatry: An Industry of Death". The clips were sections of a documentary the Church of Scientology's Freedom Magazine TV produced about the BBC Panorama programme called Panorama Exposed.

Sweeney wrote that he lost his temper due to days of harassment by Davis and the Church, and a strong personal reaction to the psychiatry exhibition. He had been visited at his hotel by Davis, despite not having shared the address with the Church, and had been followed on several occasions. Sweeney labelled the clips "attack videos" and others say they were produced to discredit him and the documentary.

The BBC in response aired its own full recording of the incident. Panorama's editor Sandy Smith explained what happened and how the BBC dealt with the incident in a post on the BBC's Editor's Blog. An internal BBC investigation found that Sweeney's conduct at one point in the filming was clearly inappropriate, but also said that Sweeney had apologised for his outburst and concluded that as a whole, filming of the documentary had been performed in a proper and fair manner. Later on that same year in the BBC Panorama year in review Sweeney said "..a new generation is making up its own mind, and for that I make no apology". Sweeney went into a similar outburst in January 2009 when being interviewed on Radio 4 about the Tom Cruise film Valkyrie—clearly referring to the episode two years previously, as a part of a rehearsed joke.

A follow-up Panorama programme also hosted by Sweeney titled "The Secrets of Scientology" was aired on 28 September 2010. This documentary contained interviews with high-profile ex-scientologists Mike Rinder and Marty Rathbun. Rinder explained the tactics used by the church during the making of the previous documentary, while Rathbun primarily discussed the allegations of David Miscavige assaulting other members of the church. Rinder had been involved in the Scientology organisation's stalking of Sweeney, and had left the Church shortly thereafter.

=== North Korea Undercover ===
In an undercover visit to North Korea, Sweeney posed as an academic from the London School of Economics whilst travelling with a party of students from the university, also including Sweeney's wife and another BBC employee. The BBC was accused of putting students at risk and of compromising the future ability of the university to pursue studies in other countries with strict regimes.

The BBC Trust Editorial Standards Committee investigated the complaints against the programme makers, and found that "the BBC failed to ensure that all the young adults Panorama travelled with were sufficiently aware of any potential risks to enable them to give informed consent. This was a serious failing, and the BBC is right to apologise to the complainants." They also found that Sweeney's wife, who was the trip organiser and tour leader, had a conflict of interest which was compounded when she became employed by the BBC for the programme.

Subsequently, a public statement signed by six of the 10 LSE student participants on the trip said that "We feel that we have now been put in more risk than was originally the case, as a result of the LSE's decision to go public with their story". They also indicated that they had no objection to the broadcast of the BBC Panorama documentary and that they were satisfied with how the BBC handled the trip. An LSE spokesman denied this. The programme was watched by five million people, making it the number 1 show in its time slot and the second-most-watched show of the night.

The programme formed the basis of a book by Sweeney, North Korea Undercover, published in November 2013.

=== Fake Sheikh: Exposed ===
Sweeney was the presenter of a controversial Panorama about the ex News of the World undercover reporter Mazher Mahmood called "Fake Sheikh: Exposed". The Attorney General, Jeremy Wright, wrote to the BBC asking them not to show it in case it prejudiced any future trial, and Mahmood unsuccessfully tried to get an injunction to stop Panorama broadcasting recent video of him with no disguise. The broadcast was twice delayed and was finally transmitted on 12 November 2014. Following the programme the Crown Prosecution Service announced that it would reinvestigate 25 cases where people were convicted on Mahmood's evidence.

=== Trump: The Kremlin Candidate? ===
Sweeney presented the documentary he researched and investigated, Trump: The Kremlin Candidate?, first broadcast for Panorama on BBC One on 16 January 2017, four days before the Inauguration of Donald Trump. Exploring the links between Trump associates and Russian officials and Russian interference in the 2016 United States elections, the documentary was well received by The Guardian, Radio Times, The National, and the Times Union. The documentary was screened in Perugia, Italy on 6 April 2017 at the International Journalism Festival. Investigative journalists Sweeney and Andrei Soldatov of Russia were in attendance at the screening.

=== Tommy Robinson ===
On 23 February 2019, about 4,000 people protested outside BBC offices in Manchester against one of Sweeney's planned Panorama episodes on the activist Tommy Robinson, who also led the protest. During the rally, undercover filming of Sweeney, obtained from a supporter of Robinson, was shown on a large screen. In the film, Sweeney is heard making a number of remarks which were racist, homophobic and anti-working class. Sweeney also made derogatory remarks about the BBC, ordered a large amount of alcoholic drinks which he claimed were being paid for with his expenses, and called former IRA leader Martin McGuinness "one of [his] political heroes". He is also clearly seen in the undercover video suggesting to a former employee of Tommy Robinson that she adds a "gender, sexual kinda thing" to her argument with Tommy Robinson. Sweeney later apologised for the remarks. The BBC stated that "any programme we broadcast will adhere to the BBC's strict editorial guidelines", and that work on the Panorama programme would continue. The NUJ condemned what they described as the intimidation of BBC staff and journalists.

Panorama issued a statement apologising on Sweeney's behalf for his "offensive and inappropriate" comments. The Panorama episode on Robinson was never shown on the BBC. On 1 October 2019, Sweeney announced via Twitter that he would be leaving the BBC after 17 years, calling founder of the Tommy Robinson a "complete cunt" after supposedly being fired because of Tommy Robinson's documentary Panodrama and the protests outside BBC Manchester.

=== Putin and Russian corruption ===
Sweeney covered Russian President Vladimir Putin's wars, including after the invasion and annexation of Crimea in 2014. He questioned Putin in 2014 for BBC News, investigated oligarch links to Putin in 2018, as well as Arron Banks' Brexit connections with the Kremlin in December 2018, and investigated Boris Johnson's mysterious trip to Perugia to party with Evgeny Lebedev in 2018.

== Later career ==
In November 2020, Sweeney's new LBC podcast Hunting Ghislaine was launched. The six part series traced the story of Ghislaine Maxwell, convicted sex offender and the daughter of Robert Maxwell.

Since 2020, Sweeney has been writing for the Byline Times and presenting on Byline TV. In February 2022, Sweeney moved to Ukraine to report on the Russian invasion of Ukraine, and has since also been writing for The Jewish Chronicle.

=== The Eastern Front: Terror & Torture in Ukraine ===
In 2023, he released the feature documentary The Eastern Front: Terror & Torture in Ukraine, directed by filmmaker Caolan Robertson with Byline TV. The film follows Sweeney, as well as veteran war photographer Paul Conroy and journalist Zarina Zabrisky as they investigate Russian war crimes in Ukraine. The film uncovered and corroborated evidence of crimes like torture, targeting civilians and the use of banned weapons like white phosphorus. The film premiered at The Frontline Club in London ahead of screenings in Kyiv, Los Angeles and London's Leicester Square.

=== Political career ===
On 24 May 2024, Sweeney was announced as the Liberal Democrat candidate for Sutton Coldfield in the 2024 general election. He was defeated by the incumbent MP, Andrew Mitchell, a member of the Conservative Party. Sweeney came in fourth place, earning 5.4% of the vote in Sutton Coldfield.

== Writing career ==
Sweeney has written several books, both fiction and non-fiction. These include the best-selling novel set in the war in Burma, Elephant Moon (2016), and a co-wrote investigation into the assassination of Daphne Caruana Galizia, Murder On The Malta Express (2019). His latest thriller is The Useful Idiot, about fake news in Stalin's Moscow in 1933, published in 2020.

== Awards ==
Sweeney has won several awards including:

- 1998: What the Papers Say Journalist of the Year prize for reports on human rights abuses in Algeria.
- 2000: an Emmy Award and a Royal Television Society prize for programmes about the Massacre at Krusha e Madhe, Kosovo.
- 2001: the Amnesty International prize for "Victims of the Torture Train," about human rights abuses in Chechnya.
- 2003: a Sony Gold award (2003) for Best Radio News programme.
- 2004: a Royal Television Society prize (2004) for "Angela's Hope," a BBC One documentary about a woman wrongly convicted of murdering her three babies.
- 2005: The Paul Foot Award.

== Books ==
=== Non-Fiction ===
- Sweeney, John (1991). The Life and Evil Times of Nicolae Ceausescu. Hutchinson. ISBN 978-0-09-174672-8.
- Sweeney, John (1993). Trading With the Enemy: Britain's Arming of Iraq. Pan Books. ISBN 978-0-330-33128-9.
- Sweeney, John (1998). Purple Homicide, Fear and Loathing on Knutsford Heath. Bloomsbury. ISBN 978-0-7475-3970-4.
- Sweeney, John (2010). Rooney's Gold. Biteback. ISBN 978-1-84954-054-4.
- Sweeney, John (2012). Big Daddy: Lukashenka, Tyrant of Belarus. Silvertail Books.
- Sweeney, John (2013). The Church of Fear : Inside The Weird World of Scientology. Silvertail Books. ISBN 978-1-909269-03-3.
  - Sweeney, John (2013). Scientology. La chiesa della paura (in Italian). Newton Compton Editori. ISBN 978-88-541-5485-8.
- Sweeney, John (2013). North Korea Undercover : Inside The World's Most Secret State. Bantam Press. ISBN 978-0-5930-7297-4.
- Bonini, Carlo; Delia, Manuel; Sweeney, John (2019). Murder on the Malta Express: Who Killed Daphne Caruana Galizia?. Midsea Books. ISBN 978-1-909269-95-8.
- Sweeney, John (2022). Killer in the Kremlin: The Explosive Account of Putin's Reign of Terror. Bantam Press. ISBN 978-1-78763-665-1.
  - Sweeney, John (2022). Der Killer im Kreml: Intrige, Mord, Krieg, Wladimir Putins skrupelloser Aufstieg und seine Vision vom großrussischen Reich (in German). Heyne Verlag. ISBN 978-3-453-21849-9.
  - Sweeney, John (2024). Il killer del Cremlino. Il regno del terrore di Vladimir Putin (in Italian). Newton Compton Editori. ISBN 978-88-227-8738-5.
- Sweeney, John (2022). Hunting Ghislaine. Hodder & Stoughton (published 3 November 2022). ISBN 978-1-5293-7587-9.
- Sweeney, John (2024). Murder in the Gulag: The Life and Death of Alexei Navalny. Hodder & Stoughton (published 25 July 2024). ISBN 978-1035422289.

=== Fiction ===
- Sweeney, John (2012). Elephant Moon. Silvertail Books. ISBN 9781909269019.
- Sweeney, John (2016). Cold. Thomas & Mercer. ISBN 978-1503934221.
- Sweeney, John (2017). Road. Thomas & Mercer. ISBN 978-1503940932.
- Sweeney, John (2020). The Useful Idiot. Silvertail Books. ISBN 978-1909269347.
