= Mario Siletti =

Italian actor (1903–1964

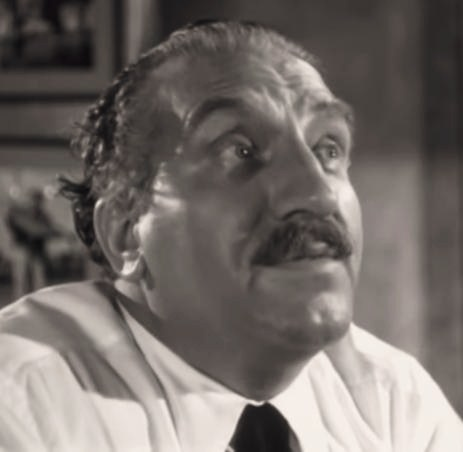
- Siletti in Kansas City Confidential (1952)
- Born: 22 July 1903; Turin, Italy
- Died: 19 April 1964 (aged 60); Los Angeles, California, U.S.
- Occupation: Actor
- Years active: 1932–1965

Mario Giovanni Siletti (22 July 1903 – 19 April 1964) was an Italian actor. He was born in Turin. He performed in more than 160 films from 1932 to 1964. He began appearing in American films no later than 1946. From 1962 to 1964, he also portrayed a recurring character, Charlie Carlotti, on the American television series, Hazel. In April 1964, he was killed in a Los Angeles automobile collision caused by a drunk driver. Siletti's pregnant wife was also critically injured in the crash. The driver of the other vehicle was arrested for felony manslaughter.

== Selected filmography ==
Film
Year	Title	Role	Notes
1946	The Razor's Edge	Miner	Uncredited
1947	Escape Me Never	Gondolier	Uncredited
1949	House of Strangers	Minor Role	Uncredited
1949	Thieves' Highway	Pietro	Uncredited
1949	The Doctor and the Girl	Mr. Crisani, Tony's Father	Uncredited
1949	Everybody Does It	Italian Opera Singer	Uncredited
1949	East Side, West Side	Mr. Sistina	Uncredited
1950	Black Hand	Benny Danetta / Nino	
1950	Under My Skin	Italian Officer	Uncredited
1950	The Reformer and the Redhead	Guest at Italian-American Rally	Uncredited
1950	The Skipper Surprised His Wife	Captain	Uncredited
1950	Crisis	General Valdini	Uncredited
1950	A Lady Without Passport	Cafe Proprietor	Uncredited
1950	The Man Who Cheated Himself	Machetti	
1951	The Enforcer	Louis - Vetto's Barber	Uncredited
1951	Stop That Cab	Giuseppe Moscadella	
1951	Go for Broke!	Italian Farmer	Uncredited
1951	The Great Caruso	Papa Caruso	
1951	The House on Telegraph Hill	Tony, the Grocer	
1951	Night Into Morning	Tony - the Barber	Uncredited
1951	Strictly Dishonorable	Luigi	
1951	Force of Arms	Signor Maduvalli	Uncredited
1951	Anne of the Indies	Slave Market Auctioneer	
1951	The Light Touch	Hotel Manager	Uncredited
1952	Belles on Their Toes	Albert - the Barber	Uncredited
1952	When in Rome	Luigi Lugucetti	
1952	Clash by Night	Bartender	Uncredited
1952	Diplomatic Courier	Russian	Uncredited
1952	Captain Pirate	Gen. Chavez	Uncredited
1952	Kansas City Confidential	Tomaso	
1952	My Cousin Rachel	Caretaker	Uncredited
1953	Girls in the Night	Bruno, Charlie's Friend in Bar	Uncredited
1953	Taxi	Amato	Uncredited
1953	Thunder Bay	Louis Chighizola	
1953	So This Is Love	Guilio Gatti-Casazza	Uncredited
1953	The Caddy	Mr. Poletti	Uncredited
1953	Big Leaguer	Mr. Polachuk	
1953	Wings of the Hawk	Marco	
1953	Hot News	Dominic	
1954	The Great Diamond Robbery	Italian	Uncredited
1954	Cardinal Lambertini	Butler	
1954	Three Coins in the Fountain	Bartender	Uncredited
1955	East of Eden	Mr. Piscora	Uncredited
1955	Hell's Island	Surgeon	
1955	Bring Your Smile Along	Ricardo	
1955	The Naked Street	Antonio Cardini	
1955	Hell on Frisco Bay	Fisherman	Uncredited
1956	Serenade	Sanroma	Uncredited
1956	The Man in the Gray Flannel Suit	Carriage Driver	Uncredited
1957	Designing Woman	Andrucci	Uncredited
1957	Man in the Shadow	Tony Santoro	
1960	Pay or Die	Enzo Loria	
1961	The Honeymoon Machine	Italian Chief of Police	Uncredited
1963	Johnny Cool	Giacomo	Uncredited
1963	4 for Texas	Bedoni	
