= Eugenio de Liguoro =

Italian actor and film director

Eugenio De Liguoro
- Born: 15 March 1899; Naples, Italy
- Died: 30 June 1952 (aged 53); Los Angeles, California; United States
- Occupations: Director; Actor
- Years active: 1914–1951

Eugenio de Liguoro (15 March 1899 – 30 June 1952) was an Italian actor and film director. He was the son of Giuseppe de Liguoro, and acted in several of his films during the 1910s as well as some in the United States. He increasingly moved behind the camera, and directed the 1933 Italian comedy Country Air. His career later took him to India and Chile. His final film was the American Stop That Cab, made for Lippert Pictures. He died suddenly in Los Angeles after making the film.

The director Wladimiro De Liguoro was his brother.

== Selected filmography ==
=== Actor ===
- Nala Damayanti (1921)
- The Fast Set (1924)
- Lost: A Wife (1925)

=== Director ===
- Country Air (1933)
- My Little One (1933)
- Stop That Cab (1951)

== Bibliography ==
- Moliterno, Gino. The A to Z of Italian Cinema. Scarecrow Press, 2009.
