= The Secrets of Scientology =

2010 British TV documentary

- BBC journalist John Sweeney, with former high-ranking Scientology officials Mark Rathbun and Mike Rinder
- Created by: Panorama · John Sweeney
- Presented by: John Sweeney
- Country of origin: United Kingdom

Production
- Running time: 60 minutes

Original release
- Network: BBC One
- Release: 28 September 2010

The Secrets of Scientology is a documentary which was broadcast on 28 September 2010 as part of the BBC's Panorama documentary strand. Presented by John Sweeney, it is a follow-up of his 2007 investigation into the Church of Scientology and features interviews with former high-ranking members of the organisation.

== Production ==
Reporter John Sweeney presented the hour-long programme, which was a follow-up to his 2007 documentary Scientology and Me in which he travelled to Los Angeles to investigate Scientology.

== Contents ==
In The Secrets of Scientology, Sweeney interviews several individuals connected with the Church of Scientology and investigates allegations by former Scientology followers that the Church (Note: Use of "Church" or "the Church" is a common shortened form of "Church of Scientology"; see The Church (Scientology).) sought to divide their families, something the Church denies.

Among those interviewed include Mike Rinder a former long-term member of the organisation and one of its officials who was assigned to "handle" Sweeney during his 2007 programme. Rinder, who left the Church soon after the previous documentary, confirms Sweeney's suspicions that he was followed by the organisation during the making of that programme. He tells the reporter; "You were being followed [...] It would have come under my purview, no doubt whatsoever." Rinder, a member of the Church since the age of six, talks about how he was subjected to "disconnection", a process by which his family cut him out of their lives.

Another Church of Scientology official interviewed during the programme is Amy Scobee, who joined the Church at the age of 14 and was a member of its Sea Org which runs the organisation's day-to-day operations. Scobee tells Sweeney of how details of her sex life before she was married were leaked to a newspaper after she left Scientology in 2005 and criticised the Church.

== Anti-documentary activity by Scientology ==
As with the 2007 documentary, Sweeney and his team were once again followed by people filming them during their visit to the United States, although on this occasion, their filming was much less covert. However, those filming refused to answer Sweeney's questions when he approached them and asked about their identity and purpose. On his return to the United Kingdom the BBC received photographs of Sweeney in a farewell embrace with Amy Scobee from Carter-Ruck, the Church's UK lawyers, something which Sweeney welcomed as proof that those following him were working on behalf of the Church.

Shortly after The Secrets of Scientology premiered, the Church created their own documentary regarding Sweeney and Mike Rinder's activities called Panorama: Desperate Lies, listing off further alleged violations of BBC and Ofcom Broadcast Codes in both of Sweeney's programs, and attempting to further discredit many of the Church detractors featured in the documentary.

== Ratings ==
The Secrets of Scientology was a ratings success for Panorama and the BBC in its initial broadcast; with MediaTel Newsline reporting, "The Panorama special, which saw reporter John Sweeney get an insider's view of the organisation, attracted more than five million peak viewers and a 20.3% average audience share during the all-important 9pm to 10pm slot." The documentary performed better than simultaneous programming for 71 Degrees North. It was the most popular programme broadcast in the 9pm hour.

== Reception ==
In a review of The Secrets of Scientology, Metro commented, "Thankfully, there was exemplary investigative journalism on the show, with the BBC man unbowed by closed avenues of inquiry or alleged surveillance." JOE.ie highlighted the documentary as its "Pick of the night" in television. The Independent selected the film as its recommendation for "Pick of the day"; it was also recommended by The Daily Telegraph, Bristol Evening Post, and Wales on Sunday. David Chater of The Times called Mike Rinder a "whistleblower", commenting, "Mike Rinder, erstwhile spokesman for the Church of Scientology and the former head of its Office of Special Affairs, has turned whistleblower and describes the operation against Sweeney last time round." Fiona Mayhem of Watch With Mothers assessed the documentary as, "a bit of a disappointing effort which could have been made more entertaining ... or more informative, by exploring more what it is about the tenets of the cult that former members still hold so dear. Still, for those with no prior knowledge of the religion, this was a decent starter pack." Paddy Sherman of the Liverpool Echo called the documentary an "in-depth look at the workings of the church". The Guardian referred to it as "a very disturbing video documentary [made] for the BBC programme Panorama". In an analysis of the documentary for Catholic Online, associate editor Randy Sly noted the programme's ratings success in the UK, and commented, "People in England seemingly can't get enough when it comes to revelations about Scientology."
