= Panorama (British TV programme) =

BBC television current affairs programme

- Also known as: Window on the World; The Window on the World; A Window on the World
- Opening theme: Francis Lai's Aujourd'hui C'est Toi
- Country of origin: United Kingdom
- Original language: English
- No. of episodes: 1,233

Production
- Running time: 30–60 minutes
- Production company: BBC Factual

Original release
- Network: BBC One
- Release: 11 November 1953 – present

Panorama is a British current affairs documentary news programme broadcast on the BBC. First broadcast in 1953, it is the world's longest-running television news magazine programme.

Panorama has been presented by many well-known BBC presenters, including Richard Dimbleby, Robin Day, David Dimbleby and Jeremy Vine. As of 2022, it broadcasts in peak time on BBC One, without a regular presenter. The programme also airs worldwide through the international feed of the BBC News channel in many countries, and domestically via the UK feed.

== History ==
Panorama was launched on 11 November 1953 by the BBC; it emphasises investigative journalism. Daily Mail reporter Pat Murphy was the original presenter, who lasted only one episode after accidentally broadcasting a technical mishap. Max Robertson then took over for a year. The programme originally had a magazine format and included art features.

In September 1955, when Richard Dimbleby took over as presenter, it got the subtitle Window on the World. He presented the show until his death in 1965.

His son, David Dimbleby, later presented the programme on 11 November 1974—the 21st anniversary of the show. Other past presenters include Robin Day, Ludovic Kennedy, Charles Wheeler and Jeremy Vine. On 13 December 2010, it was announced that the programme would be relaunched during the new year with no regular presenter.

=== International versions ===
Panorama set an example for the German magazine series of the same name, which is produced by Norddeutscher Rundfunk, and broadcast by Das Erste. Panorama started there in 1961 and is one of the leading political magazine shows.

=== Theme music ===
The original theme music was an excerpt from Pelléas et Mélisande by Sibelius, which was followed a few years later by a composition by Robert Farnon titled "Openings & Endings". From 1968, an extract from Rachmaninov's Symphony No.1 in D Minor, 4th Movement was used, followed in 1971 by an adaptation of Francis Lai's Aujourd'hui C'est Toi ("Today It's You"). The latest version was arranged in 2023 by Bojan Andic.

== Team ==
=== Editors ===
- David Webster (1967-1969)
- Glenwyn Benson (1992-1995)
- Rachel Jupp (September 2016-December 2020)

=== Presenters ===
- Patrick Murphy (1953)
- Max Robertson (1953–1954)
- Richard Dimbleby (1955–1965)
- Robin Day (1966–2000)
- Alastair Burnet (1972–1974)
- David Dimbleby (1974–1982)
- Robert Kee (1982–2013)
- Jeremy Vine (January 2007 – 2010)
- no regular presenter (since December 2010)

=== Investigators ===
- Hilary Andersson
- Richard Bilton
- Jane Corbin
- Alys Harte
- Tom Heap
- John Humphrys
- Andrew Jennings
- Shelley Jofre
- Paul Kenyon
- David Lomax
- Gerry Northam
- Monika Plaha
- Samantha Poling
- Chris Rogers
- Raphael Rowe
- George Edwin Scott
- John Sweeney
- Peter Taylor
- Jeremy Vine
- Nick Wallis
- John Ware
- Vivian White
- Benjamin Zand

== Notable programmes ==
=== Mescaline ===
In 1955, Panorama filmed Christopher Mayhew taking mescaline under medical supervision. The resulting programme was never broadcast, though the footage and transcripts were later released.

=== Spaghetti tree ===
Panorama broadcast a famous hoax film about the harvesting of the spaghetti crop on April Fool's Day, 1957, saying that it could be grown in viewers gardens. Many people watching believed this, possibly due to the fact pasta was not widely eaten in the United Kingdom at the time. When viewers called the BBC the following day to ask how they could grow spaghetti themselves, the BBC told them to "place a sprig of spaghetti in a tin of tomato sauce and hope for the best".

=== Salvador Dalí ===
Broadcast on 4 May 1955, Malcolm Muggeridge talked with Salvador Dalí, the Spanish surrealist artist.

=== Maggie's Militant Tendency ===
In January 1984, Panorama broadcast an episode which claimed that three Conservative MPs (Neil Hamilton, Harvey Proctor and Gerald Howarth) had links to far-right organisations both in Britain and on the continent.

The programme was based on an internal Conservative Party report compiled by Phil Pedley, Chairman of the Young Conservatives. Panorama confirmed its status with a senior Conservative Party vice chairman. The report was formally presented to the party in the week before the programme was aired. During the making of the programme, attempts to contact some of the named MPs for comment were unsuccessful. (Hamilton's wife Christine later described how "Neil and I had devised a method for making sure that Panorama personnel would not be in a position to say that Neil had refused to speak".) The programme was vetted prior to transmission by the BBC's lawyers, by the head of currents affairs television, and by the chief assistant to the director general, Margaret Douglas.

Two of the MPs named in the programme (Hamilton and Howarth) sued the BBC and the programme-makers. The director-general, Alasdair Milne, reviewed the BBC's own legal advice, and that of his chief assistant, and declared the programme to be "rock solid". The board of governors also gave their backing for the programme to be defended in court. Stuart Young died in August 1986, two months before the libel case against Panorama came to trial. A new chairman, Marmaduke Hussey, had been appointed but had not formally arrived at the BBC when the trial opened on 13 October 1986. Hussey nevertheless spoke with the BBC's barrister, Charles Grey. Hussey says in his memoirs that "Grey thought it unlikely the BBC would win". Sir Charles Grey disputes this statement, saying that "my junior and I both thought the case was winnable".

The first four days of the trial were given over to opening statements from Hamilton and Howarth and their lawyers, which received wide press coverage. On the evening of the fourth day the BBC's assistant director general Alan Protheroe informed the BBC's legal team and the named defendants that the governors now wished to settle the case immediately. This prevented the BBC's defence from being put to the court, or known to the public.

Hamilton and Howarth were each awarded £25,000 in damages. Costs amounted to £240,000. They dropped their case against Phil Pedley.

There was controversy over the editing of the programme: it juxtaposed shots of Howarth wearing a train driver's uniform at a steam railway enthusiasts' rally with the claim that he had attended a fascist meeting in Italy, suggesting that the uniform he was wearing was a fascist one.

=== Diana, Princess of Wales interview ===
Arguably the best-known Panorama programme is the 1995 interview of Diana, Princess of Wales by Martin Bashir. Conducted following Diana's separation from Charles, Prince of Wales, the interview openly discussed the rumours about her personal life. Its filming and planning was subject to extreme secrecy, with Richard Ayre, the controller of editorial policy, authorising a series of clandestine meetings between Bashir and Diana.

A quarter-century later, it was revealed that Bashir had used journalistically unethical practices in gaining the interview. In late 2020, the BBC director general Tim Davie apologised to Earl Spencer, Diana's brother, for the use of highly dubious methods. The Earl, who had introduced Diana and Bashir, rejected the apology and demanded an inquiry. Former Justice of the Supreme Court John Dyson, Lord Dyson conducted an independent inquiry into the issue. Dyson's inquiry found Bashir guilty of deceit and breaching BBC editorial conduct to obtain the interview.

=== Omagh bombing ===
One of the most controversial broadcasts of recent time was the "Who bombed Omagh?" programme, which named those suspected of involvement in the Omagh bombing. Deputy Assistant Commissioner Alan Fry of Scotland Yard's anti-terrorist unit SO13 said that the Real IRA attack on the BBC Television Centre could have been a revenge attack for the broadcast.

=== Scientology ===
In 1987, the Panorama programme "Scientology: The Road to Total Freedom?" for the first time exposed on broadcast television the secret upper-level doctrines of the Church of Scientology, and featured an animated retelling of the Xenu incident of Scientology doctrine.

On 14 May 2007, an episode titled "Scientology and Me" was broadcast. The journalist John Sweeney presented the edition, showing how the Church reacted to his journalistic investigations, including its reaction when he stated to members that some people describe the organisation as a "cult". At one point during an interview, the presenter lost his temper with the Church's international spokesman; an edited portion of this incident was released subsequently by the Church on YouTube and DVD in an attempt to publicise it and raise controversy. However, the 2007 Scientology episode was Panorama's greatest audience since it moved to Monday evening.

A follow-up programme, "The Secrets of Scientology", was broadcast on 28 September 2010, presenting proof that the Church had harassed Sweeney during the making of the earlier documentary, with the specific intention of making him react in the way he eventually did. The episode also included numerous interviews with former high-ranking members of the organisation who had been subject to harassment.

=== Panorama and Seroxat ===
Since 2002, Panorama has made four programmes about the anti-depressant Seroxat (paroxetine / Paxil): "The Secrets of Seroxat" (2002); "Seroxat: Emails from the Edge" (2003); "Taken on Trust" (2004) and "Secrets of the Drug Trials" (2007).

"The Secrets of Seroxat" elicited a record response from the public as 65,000 people telephoned the BBC helpline and 1,300 people emailed Panorama directly.

The major mental health charity Mind collaborated with Panorama in a survey of those who emailed the programme. Anonymous findings from the 239 responses were sent to the Medicines and Healthcare products Regulatory Agency (MHRA).

The second Panorama programme on Seroxat, "Emails from the Edge", included a report of the survey to which the 239 people responded. It showed widespread experiences of suicidal feelings and other severe reactions, very bad withdrawal symptoms and lack of warnings from doctors. After the broadcast users/survivors and Mind protested outside the offices of the MHRA.

On 29 January 2007, the fourth documentary of the series about the drug Seroxat was broadcast. It focused on three GlaxoSmithKline paediatric clinical trials on depressed children and adolescents. Data from the trials show that Seroxat could not be proven to work for teenagers. Not only that, but also one clinical trial indicated that they were six times more likely to become suicidal after taking it. In the programme, Panorama revealed the secret trail of internal emails which show how GlaxoSmithKline manipulated the results of the trials for its own commercial gain. Access to the documents has been gained as GlaxoSmithKline fights a fraud trial in the US.

Some of these previously secret Glaxo documents featured in the programme were leaked into the internet after the programme's broadcast.

=== Undercover: Football's Dirty Secrets ===
On 19 September 2006 Panorama showed a documentary called "Undercover: Football's Dirty Secrets", which alleged payments in English football contrary to the rules of the Football Association, involving:

- That Bolton Wanderers manager Sam Allardyce, and his agent son Craig were implicated for taking "bungs" (a bribe or kickback) from agents for signing certain players. Two agents, Teni Yerima and Peter Harrison, were secretly filmed, each claiming separately that they had paid Allardyce through his son. Allardyce denies ever taking, or asking for, a bung. The programme was aired on the same night that Bolton beat Walsall 3–1 in the Carling Cup, so Allardyce missed the original showing.
- Portsmouth manager Harry Redknapp is secretly filmed discussing the possibility of buying the Blackburn Rovers captain Andy Todd with agent Peter Harrison, which is against Football Association rules.
- Then Portsmouth first-team coach Kevin Bond, who was first team coach of Newcastle United at the time of broadcast, is secretly recorded admitting he would consider discussing receiving payments from a proposed new agency involving agent Peter Harrison. Consequently, Bond was relieved of his duties at Newcastle.
- Chelsea director of youth football Frank Arnesen is secretly filmed making an illegal approach or "tapping up" Middlesbrough's England youth star 15-year-old Nathan Porritt. Arnesen offers a fee of £150,000 spread over three years as an incentive to relocate. Both of these allegations are against FA rules.
- Agent Peter Harrison told the undercover reporter that, to secure transfer deals with Bolton, he bribed Sam Allardyce by offering to pay his son Craig. Harrison is a FIFA-listed agent who is based in the north-east of England.
- That three different Bolton transfer signings involved secret payments from agents to Craig Allardyce, some when he was contractually banned from doing any Bolton deals. Panorama alleged Bolton's transfer signings of defender Tal Ben Haim, midfielder Hidetoshi Nakata and goalkeeper Ali Al-Habsi involved secret payments from agents to Craig Allardyce. Allardyce's son quit the agency business in summer 2006, and has admitted in newspaper interviews that his working as an agent might have cost his father the chance of becoming England manager.

=== Sex Crimes and the Vatican ===
On 1 October 2006, Panorama broadcast an episode on Crimen Sollicitationis, a church "instruction" approved by Pope John XXIII in 1962, which establishes a procedure for dealing with child sex abuse scandals within the Catholic Church. It was enforced for 20 years by Cardinal Joseph Ratzinger before he became the Pope. It instructs bishops on how to deal with allegations of child abuse against priests. Critics claim the document has been used to evade prosecution for sex crimes.

=== Daylight Robbery ===
Panorama investigated claims that as much as $23 billion (£11.75 billion) may have been lost, stolen or not properly accounted for in Iraq.

The United States Department of Justice has imposed gagging orders that prevent discussion of the allegations. US and other media have reported little on this issue.

=== Death in the Med ===
In a programme broadcast in 2010, Jane Corbin investigated what really happened on the ship MV Mavi Marmara, when Israeli commandos seized the ship as part of the blockade of Gaza.

Abbas Al Lawati, a reporter for Gulf News, who was on the Mavi Marmara during the Gaza flotilla raid, criticised Panorama's reporting of the raid in the documentary, "Death in the Med", stating that it was either a result of "weak journalism" or "deep bias". Nobel Peace Laureate Mairead Maguire, who had also participated in the Free Gaza flotilla, has also accused the programme of a "lack of truth" and "bias" in a letter to the BBC, describing its effects on the families of those who died as a "grave injustice".

"The BBC Trust has ruled that a Panorama documentary about the Israeli boarding of the Mavi Marmara was "accurate and impartial" overall..."

=== FIFA's Dirty Secrets ===
On 29 November 2010, three days before voting for the 2018 FIFA World Cup, Panorama broadcast an investigation into bribes by senior FIFA officials.

=== Undercover Care: The Abuse Exposed ===
On 31 May 2011 Panorama aired an investigation into physical and psychological abuse suffered by people with learning disabilities and challenging behaviour at Winterbourne View private hospital in Bristol. It showed a number of patients being repeatedly punched, kicked, slapped, pinned down and given cold punishment showers – then left outside in near-zero degree temperatures.

Local social services and the national regulator had received various warnings but the mistreatment continued. One senior nurse three times contacted the national regulator saying he wanted to talk about "abuse" – but heard nothing back. The hospital was shut down.

On 21 June 2011, 86 people and organisations wrote to prime minister, David Cameron about the revelations, "We are aware of the various actions currently being taken within and outside government – such as the DH review and CQC internal enquiry. We hope to make submissions to those both individually and collectively. However, on their own these will not be enough and a clear programme is needed to achieve change."

The prime minister responded saying he was "appalled" at the "catalogue of abuses" Panorama had revealed.

In June 2011 the Association of Supported Living issued a press statement, which was followed up in writing to every member of parliament in the United Kingdom, calling for community-based assisted living services to replace institutional services for people with learning disabilities.

The national regulator, the Care Quality Commission (CQC) did a nationwide check on facilities owned by the same company – as a result, three more institutions have been closed.

The CQC also inspected 132 similar institutions and a Serious Case Review was commissioned — some of the roughly ten local and national enquiries were carried out to examine what went wrong, including one by NHS South West which was one of the first to be published and list many of the others.

The head of the Care Quality Commission resigned ahead of a critical government report, a report in which Winterbourne View was cited.

Eleven people plead guilty to criminal offences of neglect or abuse as a result of evidence from Undercover Care and six of them were jailed. Immediately after the eleventh person pleaded guilty, the Serious Case Review was published, revealing hundreds of previous incidents at the hospital and missed warnings.

Mencap published a report warning that similar abuse could be going on elsewhere and calling for the closure of all large institutions far from people's families.

The film has also won a number of awards including the RTS Scoop of the year and a BAFTA.

The Daily Telegraph said, "It is impossible to read the details of what went on at Winterbourne View, a care home for the severely disabled in Gloucestershire, without feeling repelled. In the wake of an exposé from the BBC's Panorama, 11 members of staff were convicted of almost 40 charges of neglect and ill-treatment of those in their care."

=== Euro 2012: Stadiums of Hate ===
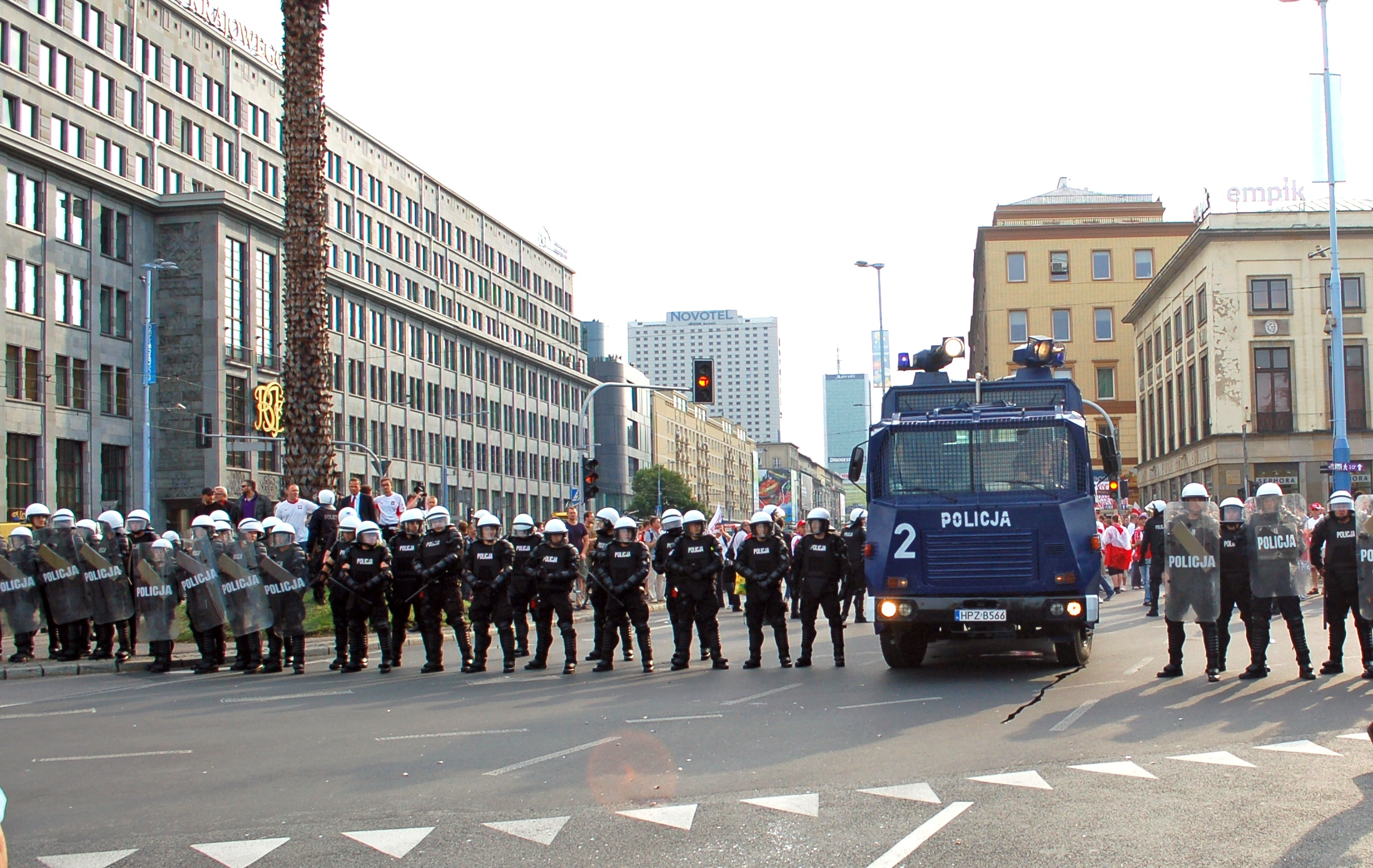
Police in Warsaw on 12 June 2012

On 28 May 2012 Panorama examined the issues of racism, antisemitism and football hooliganism which it stated were prevalent among Polish and Ukrainian fans. The programme, titled "Euro 2012: Stadiums of Hate", included recent footage of fans chanting various antisemitic slogans and displays of white power symbols and banners. The documentary recorded antisemitism and monkey noise taunts of black players in Poland. In Ukraine, the documentary recorded Nazi salutes and FC Metalist Kharkiv fans violently assaulting a group of Asian students at the Metalist Oblast Sports Complex, one of the stadiums hosting matches in Ukraine. Panorama filmed former England defender Sol Campbell watching these clips, and then asked him whether he would recommend families go to the Championship. He responded: "Stay at home, watch it on TV. Don't even risk it... because you could end up coming back in a coffin."

The report was then followed up by most of the British media, which published a large number of articles accusing Poles and Ukrainians of racism.

The documentary was criticised as sensationalist, unbalanced and unethical. Jonathan Ornstein, Director of the Jewish Community Center in Kraków, Poland, and who was interviewed for the film said: "I am furious at the way the BBC has exploited me as a source. The organization used me and others to manipulate the serious subject of anti-Semitism for its own sensationalist agenda... the BBC knowingly cheated its own audience – the British people – by concocting a false horror story about Poland. In doing so, the BBC has spread fear, ignorance, prejudice and hatred. I am profoundly disturbed by this unethical form of journalism." The BBC rejected Ornstein's criticism, however, saying: "The context of the programme was made clear to Mr Ornstein both before and during the interview which he kindly agreed to do with the programme makers. Panorama disagrees in the strongest terms that his interview was misrepresented." The BBC reproduced the text of Ornstein's interview, including those parts which were not broadcast, and also pointed out that Ornstein "contacted the programme makers two days after it was broadcast in the UK on 28 May and immediately thereafter running on YouTube. He made none of the comments featured in his statement of Wednesday 6 June. We note that his statement was made following the programme's broadcast on Tuesday 5th June on Polish TV."

Another source used in the film, anti-racism campaigner Jacek Purski said: "The material prepared by the BBC is one-sided. It does not show the whole story of Polish preparations for the Euros. It does not show the Championship ran a lot of activities aimed at combating racism in the "Respect Diversity" campaign. For us the Euro is not only about matches. The event has become an opportunity to fight effectively against racism and promote multiculturalism. There is no country in Europe free from racism. These are the facts."

Black Polish MP John Godson said: "The documentary was biased, one-sided and rather sensational. I have received information that there were also interviews that were omitted by the BBC—for example, interview with the Polish police."

A reporter from Gazeta Wyborcza, Poland's most popular left-wing newspaper, questioned Panorama's practices and said: "I am becoming more and more surprised with what the BBC says. So far it has denied two situations I witnessed. I would not be surprised if the BBC prepared a statement saying that the Panorama crew has never been to Poland."

Ukrainian foreign ministry spokesman Oleh Voloshyn responded that the allegations were an "invented and mythical problem", and that "Nazi symbols can be seen at ... any match in England". Polish Prime Minister Donald Tusk stated: "Nobody who comes to Poland will be in any danger because of his race. This is not our custom, as is not pointing out similar incidents in other countries."

The Guardian reported: "Other sources have come forward to say that an interview with a Jewish Israeli player was also cut from the programme because he failed to confirm Panorama's "anti-semitism" thesis. The BBC interviewed midfielder Aviram Baruchian, who plays for the Polish team Polonia Warsaw. One source who was present said the Panorama journalists had complained afterwards that the interview was "useless". Panorama strongly denies this. It says the interview was not used because Baruchian had played in the Polish league since only January.

Panorama responded to the criticism, saying:

England Fans, the official England Supporters' Club, travelling to Euro 2012 called the programme unhelpful and some Poles in the UK have expressed concern that they have been labelled as racist. But amid all of these accusations against Panorama and the BBC, there is a real fear that the key issue has been missed – the overt and frightening racist and anti-Semitic abuse and violence of the kind broadcast by Panorama is both wrong and deeply upsetting to those on its receiving end. That was the point of the programme. We set out to highlight a wrong. Were the beatings that the students from India sustained in Ukraine's Metalist stadium somehow "exaggerated"? Was the fact that they said the police were of "no use" as they walked off bruised and alone into the Ukrainian night somehow "made up"? Were the monkey chants hurled at the black players we filmed in Poland somehow "sensationalised"

—

England football coach Roy Hodgson said the racism allegations were "the biggest negativity in England... As a result, I think we've lost a lot of fans who didn't come because of a lot of horror stories about how life would be in the Ukraine and Poland." Hodgson added that he had nothing but positive impressions of Poland and Ukraine.

Jessica Elgot wrote an article in The Jewish Chronicle headlined "I went all the way to 'racist' Kiev and all I got was love", reporting how "By-and-large, no one understood why we were going. Friends raised their eyebrows in horror, before inquiring if we had seen "that Panorama programme". My grandmother politely inquired why we wanted to go to "that shmatte place". As I left for the airport, I got a sweet good-bye text from my house-mate. "Have a lovely trip. Please don't get Jew-bashed."

The deputy mayor of Kraków, referring to the incidents of racism and anti-Semitism broadcast by Panorama, said: "We believe that, step by step, the clubs will also take more responsibility for this kind of activity at stadiums". Adam Bulandra, project coordinator of the Interkulturalni Foundation and co-author of Kraków's new anti-racist strategy said: "The local community does not react properly to this problem, it does not actively oppose the incidents that happen, that's why they are so visible, and we want to change this situation." A spokesperson for Poland's Ombudsman for Citizens' Rights, noted that while there may seem to be only a small number of racist incidents in Poland, that 80 per cent of racist crimes go unreported in the country.

In 2014, Jewish News and other news organizations reported that during the making of the documentary, host Chris Rogers had been filmed giving a Nazi salute while marching in front of the crew. Rogers was reprimanded by the BBC, apologized and had not been re-hired by the Panorama program for two years after the incident.

=== North Korea Undercover ===
"North Korea Undercover" was filmed in North Korea in late March 2013 by a three-person team that accompanied a group of students from the London School of Economics. The trip was organised through the Grimshaw Club – an international relations club affiliated with LSE – by Tomiko Sweeney, the wife of John Sweeney. The North Koreans, who require permission for entry by journalists, and who have jailed journalists who have attempted unauthorised entry, were not informed of the BBC team and failed to recognise John Sweeney, calling him "professor". The degree to which the students were informed led to a difference of opinion between the institutions later, with the BBC maintaining that less than full disclosure was a measure taken to protect the students in the event of discovery. Sweeney and his wife were accompanied by a BBC cameraman.

Subsequently, however, a public statement signed by six of the 10 LSE student participants on the trip said that "We feel that we have now been put in more risk than was originally the case, as a result of the LSE's decision to go public with their story". They also indicated that they had no objection to the broadcast of the BBC Panorama documentary and that they were satisfied with how the BBC handled the trip.

According to Gianluca Spezza, an informed critic and one of the directors of NK News, the documentary was of low quality, comparable to many of the videos frequently taken by tourists and posted to YouTube. In addition, according to Spezza, the undercover filming had a detrimental effect on responsible efforts to engage in legitimate cultural exchange and development of mutual understanding.

=== Contaminated Blood: The Search for the Truth ===
Originally broadcast on 10 May 2017, the one-hour special episode "Contaminated Blood: The Search for the Truth" examined some of the events surrounding the contaminated blood scandal of the 1970s and 1980s, whereby haemophiliacs were infected with Hepatitis C and HIV via Factor VIII medicine products.

The programme featured former health ministers Andy Burnham and David Owen, both were critical of successive governments roles in the scandal, with the former suggesting it was "criminal". Professor John Cash (former Director of the Scottish National Blood Transfusion Service) told the programme that the truth about the scandal in England and Wales "[had] not yet been told".

One of the victims' sons, Jason Evans, told the programme he was taking legal action, which was subsequently billed by the press as a "landmark legal case", calling for a public inquiry into records and documents of the scandal, with allegations that some records could have been destroyed at the time. The case, titled Jason Evans & Others v Secretary of State for Health, is ongoing as of February 2022; an inquiry into the scandal, also ongoing as of February 2022, was announced by prime minister Theresa May shortly after the programme aired.

=== Is Labour Anti-Semitic? ===
The hour-long episode "Is Labour Anti-Semitic?" premiered on 10 July 2019 and explored allegations of antisemitism in the Labour Party. During the programme, eight former members of Labour party staff said that senior Labour figures had intervened to downgrade punishments handed out to members over antisemitism. The Labour Party criticised the programme prior to broadcast and issued the following statement afterwards:

"The Panorama programme was not a fair or balanced investigation. It was a seriously inaccurate, politically one-sided polemic, which breached basic journalistic standards, invented quotes and edited emails to change their meaning. It was an overtly biased intervention by the BBC in party political controversy. An honest investigation into antisemitism in Labour and wider society is in the public interest. The Panorama team instead pre-determined an answer to the question posed by the programme's title."

The programme was presented by John Ware and produced by Neil Grant, both of whom also worked on a 2015 Panorama programme, "Labour's Earthquake". Grant, who had been a teacher at JFS and London Labour Party activist, also produced a 2016 Dispatches programme, "Battle for the Labour Party". Both programmes were strongly criticised by supporters of party leader Jeremy Corbyn. Ken Loach called it "probably the most disgusting programme I've ever seen on the BBC. Disgusting because it raised the horror of racism against Jews in the most atrocious propagandistic way, with crude journalism ... and it bought the propaganda from people who were intent on destroying Corbyn."

The Labour Party submitted a formal complaint about the programme to the BBC, which received around 1,600 complaints in total. The BBC's Executive Complaints Unit rejected these complaints. More than 20 complaints of bias were taken to Ofcom, which ruled that the programme had been "duly impartial" and had given appropriate weight to Labour's position.

After the episode aired, a party spokesman accused staff featured in the documentary of being "disaffected former officials... who have always opposed Corbyn's leadership, worked to actively undermine it, and have both personal and political axes to grind." Labour Party staff represented by the GMB Union voted 124–4 to demand the party apologise to the former staff and John Cryer, chair of the Parliamentary Labour Party, said that attacking former Labour staff who appeared on the documentary was "a gross misjudgment". Five of the staff featured announced their intention to sue the party, claiming that Labour's response breached its commitment to protect the rights of whistleblowers and 'defamed' them.

In July 2020, the Labour Party, now under the leadership of Keir Starmer, retracted in full the allegations it had made about both John Ware and the participants in the Panorama documentary, which it conceded were false, issued a formal apology, and agreed to pay damages and costs, estimated to be around £600,000.

In 2022, an Al Jazeera documentary called The Labour Files depicted the Panorama episode as highly misleading and showed it had spliced together different parts of a whistleblower's statement, falsely rendering it as accusing Labour members of praising Hitler "every day" in her presence. In December 2022, the BBC published a clarification stating that if the episode were to be re-broadcast, the whistlerblower's "additional comments" would be shown. In a public letter to The Guardian, Ware and Grant admitted this clip was mishandled, though still defending the overall merit of the episode. Labour Files producer Richard Sanders commented in his own letter to The Guardian that it "was always extremely improbable" that Labour members would have praised Hitler, citing approvingly Peter Oborne's comment in the Al Jazeera episode that by "the summer of 2019… you could say whatever you liked about Jeremy Corbyn's Labour party", to explain the BBC's editorial attitude. Sanders additionally slammed the BBC's clarification as obviously disingenuous.

The Forde Report, commissioned under Starmer's leadership, also came to the conclusion that the presentation Panorama made of the controversy was "entirely misleading." The report's author, Martin Forde KC, received a request from the BBC and Ware to amend the report's approach to the Panorama episode, with Forde describing an email Ware sent him as "quite aggressive in tone", but ultimately deciding against any such changes.

=== Has the government failed the NHS? ===
Broadcast on 27 April 2020, the episode "Has the government failed the NHS?", presented by reporter Richard Bilton, investigated the UK government's alleged failure to stockpile critical equipment such as personal protective equipment (PPE), and the impact this had on the management of COVID-19 within the NHS during the pandemic's early months. The investigation also examined the reversal of the designation of COVID-19 as a "High consequence infectious disease" (HCID) and the simultaneous downgrading of PPE guidance. It was argued that the decision-making was fuelled, in part, by the lack of suitable equipment in the stockpile.

Among the interviewees was public health expert John Ashton, who described the findings as "breathtaking" and said "The consequence of not planning; not ordering kit; not having stockpiles is that we are sending into the front line doctors, nurses, other health workers and social care workers without the equipment to keep them safe".

=== The Missing Princess ===
In February 2021, Panorama released a full-fledged investigative documentary, The Missing Princess, about the daughter of Dubai ruler Sheikh Mohammed bin Rashid Al Maktoum, Princess Latifa, who attempted to flee her home country in 2018. However, she was captured and brought back to Dubai from international waters. In 2019, a family court in the UK ruled that Sheikh Mohammed had ordered the abduction of Princess Latifa, who was publicly seen only once since, in December 2018 during the visit of former United Nations High Commissioner for Human Rights, Mary Robinson.

The Missing Princess was released in 2021, after Panorama received a video message secretly recorded by Latifa bint Mohammed Al Maktoum from her bathroom in 2018. The messages were sent by Princess Latifa's friends, who were not able to get in touch with her for a long time. The Princess accused her father, Sheikh Mohammed, of holding her "hostage". She also gave details of her abduction, where she was drugged and brought back by Emirati soldiers on a boat and then a private jet. Saying that she feared for her life, Latifa complained about being tired in the solitary confinement without any medical and legal assistance.

Release of the documentary prompted the United Nations to intervene in the matter, where the organisation questioned the United Arab Emirates about Princess Latifa and asked for a proof that she is alive.

=== Trump: A Second Chance? editing controversy and BBC resignations ===
The episode titled "Trump: A Second Chance?" aired on 28 October 2024 in the run up to the 2024 United States presidential election. It looked at the reasons why supporters of candidate for President of the United States Donald Trump wanted him to return to the White House and why Trump continued to be a popular choice for voters in general. The episode sparked major controversy as it featured two small snippets relating to the 6 January United States Capitol attack edited to sound like a single quote: "We’re going to walk down to the Capitol and I’ll be there with you, and we fight. We fight like hell”. The two snippets of speech used in the edit were actually spoken almost an hour apart from each other. The BBC was heavily criticised by viewers for making it appear as though Trump had incited the attacks, omitting the sections of Trump's speech where he called for a peaceful protest. On 9 November 2025, more than a year after the episode first aired, BBC Director-General Tim Davie and the BBC's CEO of news, Deborah Turness, both resigned from their posts as a result of the controversies caused by this Trump-themed episode and the subsequent documentary programme Gaza: How to Survive a Warzone, which was not part of Panorama (as it was commissioned by the BBC for This World). Trump has subsequently threatened the BBC with legal action as a result of the programme. The same day, BBC chairman Samir Shah publicly apologised for an "error of judgment" in the way the speech by Trump was edited. Shah acknowledged that the editing "did give the impression of a direct call for violent action."

== Programme influenced by security services ==
In December 2011, it was revealed that former BBC Director General Sir Ian Trethowan had met in 1981 with the chiefs of MI5 and the Secret Intelligence Service about an episode of Panorama dealing with the security services. He showed a video recording of the original programme to Bernard Sheldon, legal adviser to MI5, who suggested cuts to the programme. Trethowan asked the head of BBC News to reduce the programme to half its length, including the cuts suggested by MI5.

== Scheduling ==
The scheduling of Panorama has, since the 1980s, often been a subject of media debate and controversy, owing to the duties of the BBC to provide both, on the one hand, entertaining programming that appeals to a mass audience, and on the other serious journalism that might have a narrower audience. In February 1985, with the programme being watched by an average audience of just 3.5 million viewers, Controller of BBC One Michael Grade moved the programme from its traditional prime time 8.10 pm slot on Monday evenings back to 9.30 pm, after the Nine O'Clock News. Despite many protests about this move in the media, Panorama remained in this slot until 1997, although two of Grade's successors, Alan Yentob and Michael Jackson, were known to be unhappy about running 70 continuous minutes of news from 9 pm. In May 1997 the Acting Controller of BBC One, Mark Thompson, did move Panorama back half an hour to 10 pm, to make way for the sitcom Birds of a Feather, which opened the BBC to criticism that it was sidelining serious content in favour of lighter programming.

In 2000, the programme was moved again, with the 10 pm timeslot no longer available owing to the transferring of the BBC News from 9 pm to the later slot. Panorama was moved to Sunday nights, after the news, usually shown at around 10.15 pm – labelled by some critics as a "graveyard slot". The number of editions made per year was also reduced, which attracted press criticism for the BBC in general and its Director-General Greg Dyke in particular, as Dyke was the driving force behind the schedule changes. The incoming Controller of BBC One, Lorraine Heggessey, defended the move, claiming that the programme's audience would have "dwindled" had it remained on Monday nights.

In January 2007 Heggessey's successor, Peter Fincham, moved Panorama back from Sunday nights to a prime time Monday evening slot at 8.30 pm, reduced to half an hour. This decision was at least partly in response to a demand from the Board of Governors of the BBC for the channel to show more current affairs programming during prime time.

== Archive ==
A series of Panorama transcripts, dating between 1958 and 1961, are housed at the British Library. The papers can be accessed through the British Library catalogue.

== See also ==
- This World
- Dispatches (Channel 4, 1987–)
- World in Action (ITV, 1963–1998)
- This Week (ITV, 1956–1979, 1986–1992)
- Unreported World (Channel 4, 2000–)
- 60 Minutes (American investigative journalism news magazine broadcast on CBS, 1968-)
- Four Corners (Australian investigative journalism and current affairs programme broadcast on ABC TV, 1961–)

== Bibliography ==
- Richard Lindley (2002), Panorama: Fifty Years of Pride and Paranoia, Politico's, ISBN 1-902301-80-3
