= Scientology and abortion =

Views and policies of Scientology on abortion

The intersection of Scientology and abortion has a controversial history which began with Scientology founder L. Ron Hubbard's discussion of abortion in his 1950 book Dianetics: The Modern Science of Mental Health. Hubbard wrote in Dianetics that abortion and attempts at abortion could cause trauma to the fetus and to the mother in both spiritual and physical ways. Scientologists came to believe that attempted abortions could cause traumatic experiences felt by the fetus, which would later be remembered as memories referred to in Scientology as "engrams". In the Scientology technique called Auditing, Scientologists are frequently queried regarding their sexual feelings and behaviors. These questions about Scientologists' sexual behavior are often posed to members during "security checks", a specific form of auditing sessions where individuals are required to document their divergence from the organization's ethics. One of the questions asked in these security checks is, "Have you ever been involved in an abortion?".

A female former member of Scientology's elite organization called the Sea Org discussed the views of Scientology concerning abortion with sociologist Stephen A. Kent. She told Kent that while the Sea Org operated at sea during the mid-1970s, women understood that they were not to have children. She stated to Kent that women on the ships were pressured into having abortions. In 1994, former Scientologist and Sea Org member Mary Tabayoyon filed a legal declaration in which she said that while at Scientology's base in Hemet, California, members of the Sea Org were instructed not to have children, and were coerced to have abortions. In 1999, former Scientologist Jesse Prince told The Press-Enterprise that after his wife Monika became pregnant while both were working at the Scientology complex Golden Era Productions in Gilman Hot Springs, California, she was ordered to have an abortion in order for the couple to remain in the Sea Org. Scientology representatives at the time asserted that Prince's wife chose of her own volition to have an abortion, and was not forced to do so.

In 2001, former Scientologist Astra Woodcraft told the San Francisco Chronicle that if a woman gets pregnant while in the Sea Org, she will either be sent to a lower-level organization of Scientology, or be pressured to have an abortion. In April 2008, Woodcraft appeared along with Scientology leader David Miscavige's niece Jenna Miscavige Hill on the ABC News program Nightline, and both asserted that Sea Org members who become pregnant are told to either leave or get an abortion. Claire Headley was an employee at Scientology's facility Golden Era Productions from 1991 to 2005 and a Scientologist and Sea Org member. In 2009, she filed a lawsuit against Golden Era Productions in which she asserted she was forced to undergo two abortions in order to keep her position with her employer. Scientology representative Tommy Davis described her lawsuit as "utterly meritless", and said that Scientologists who sign up for the Sea Org know that they are "becoming a part of a highly dedicated, highly disciplined, very regulated lifestyle as part of a religious order". Laura DeCrescenzo filed a lawsuit in 2009 against Scientology, in which she asserted that she was forced to have an abortion at age 17.

In commentary on Scientology and practices in the Sea Org, new religious movements scholar J. Gordon Melton told the San Francisco Chronicle that members of the Sea Org are discouraged from having children. Melton wrote in a contribution in the book New Religious Movements and Religious Liberty in America that he had yet to see documents confirming whether Scientology had a policy demanding that pregnant members of the Sea Org get an abortion. In an article for the Marburg Journal of Religion, Stephen A. Kent wrote that "researchers should not be surprised to learn of pressures that Sea Org women felt to either abort pregnancies or give-up children for adoption". Kent commented, "Sea Org obligations override many personal and family obligations and responsibilities, and devotion to the Scientology cause often appears to take priority over the needs of children."

== L. Ron Hubbard's views ==
"The child on whom the abortion is attempted is condemned to live with murderers..."

— L. Ron Hubbard, Dianetics

Scientology founder L. Ron Hubbard wrote in Dianetics: The Modern Science of Mental Health that abortion and attempts at abortion could cause trauma to the fetus and to the mother in both spiritual and physical ways. The St. Petersburg Times reported on how Hubbard's views from Dianetics affect Scientology practitioners, "Abortion is therefore rare among Scientologists, recognizing that even the fetus may have already been occupied by a spiritual being. In some instances, abortion might be chosen of health concerns of the mother or other personal factors." Hubbard asserted, "It is a scientific fact that abortion attempts are the most important factor in aberration", and stated "Attempted abortion is very common. ... Twenty or thirty abortion attempts are not uncommon in the aberree." He believed that attempted abortions led to ulcers.

Hubbard wrote in Dianetics, "The child on whom the abortion is attempted is condemned to live with murderers whom he reactively knows to be murderers through all this weak and helpless youth!". He asserted:

A large proportion of allegedly feeble-minded children are actually attempted abortion cases, whose engrams place them in fear paralysis or regressive palsy and which command them not to grow but to be where they are forever. However many billions America spends yearly on institutions for the insane and jails for the criminals are spent primarily because of attempted abortions done by some sex-blocked mother to whom children are a curse, not a blessing of God.

In a 1950 article in Look magazine, Albert Q. Maisel wrote, "Unlike many religious groups, the proponents of dianetics have nothing against birth control. But the greatest of all crimes and the root of most evils, as they see it, is the attempt—or even just the verbal wish—to cause the abortion of a child already conceived. They object here, not so much on moral grounds, as because such attempts—or such wishes and thoughts—load down the time track with the basic-basic demon engram.

In his 1951 book Science of Survival, Hubbard wrote that a mother who reached a status of 1.1 ("Covert hostility") on the "tone scale" listed in the book would "attempt the abortion of her child", and that any woman who attempted an abortion would occupy this level or below. Such a woman, he wrote, "can be expected to be unreliable, inconstant and promiscuous; and the child is looked upon as evidence of this promiscuity."

According to The World's Religions: The Study of Religion, Traditional and New Religion, "early Dianetics enthusiasts believed that attempted abortion of the fetus by its mother caused "traumatic experiences in intra-uterine life". Stephen J. Hunt noted in Alternative Religions that Scientologists believe certain events in one's life may trigger a memory referred to in Scientology as an "engram". Hunt wrote, "The engram may be triggered by association of events and objects. Although the conscious mind will eventually forget an incident, the reactive mind stores every detail. According to Hubbard, some of the most powerful engrams are constructed while still in the womb. The unborn child hears the angry words of parents caught up in marital disputes or perhaps talk of abortion.

== Scientology practice ==
=== Auditing ===
In the Scientology technique called Auditing, Scientologists are frequently queried regarding their sexual feelings and behaviors. These questions about Scientologists' sexual behavior are often posed to members during "security checks", a specific form of auditing sessions where individuals are required to document their divergence from the organization's ethics. Scientologists on the spiritual pathway known as "The Bridge to Total Freedom" are given security checks, and those of the level called Operating Thetan receive these checks once every six months. Scientology officials explained that the security checks are given "to make sure they're using the tech correctly". Among the sexual questions asked in the Scientology security checks include, "Have you ever practiced sex with animals?", "Have you ever practiced sodomy?", "Have you ever slept with a member of a race of another color?", and "Have you ever been involved in an abortion?".

=== Sea Org ===
In a 1987 interview with sociologist Stephen A. Kent, a former member of Scientology's elite organization called the Sea Org discussed the views of Scientology with regard to abortion in the 1970s. During the mid-1970s, the Sea Org operated on vessels at sea. Women understood that it was not permitted to raise children on board the ships. According to woman interviewed by Kent, these women on board the Sea Org ships were pressured to undergo abortions. "On the ship, I know of a lot of people that had abortions, because they didn't want to leave the ship. It wasn't like anybody said 'You have got to get an abortion.' It was more an implied thing. If you don't you're going to leave," said the woman to Kent.

Mary Tabayoyon joined Scientology in 1967 and became a member of the Sea Org in 1971, later leaving Scientology in 1992. Tabayoyon filed a legal declaration on August 26, 1994 in the case Church of Scientology International vs. Steven Fishman and Uwe Geertz, describing Scientology's practices on having children in the Sea Org. She said that while at Scientology's base in Hemet, California, "members of the Sea Org were forbidden to have any more children if they were to stay on post[,] and the Hubbard technology was applied to coercively persuade us to have abortions so that we could remain on post". According to Tabayoyon this pressure was exerted during a Scientology procedure known as "ethics handling", where individuals were instructed to go along with L. Ron Hubbard's policies as well as those of Scientology. Tabayoyon said "[I] gave up my child due to my greatly misguided obligation and dedication to the Sea Org". She stated she made the decision to give up her child because she was "indoctrinated to believe that I should never put my own personal desires ahead of the accomplishment of the purpose of the Sea Org".

In 1999, former Scientologist Jesse Prince told The Press-Enterprise that after his wife Monika became pregnant while both were working at the Scientology complex Golden Era Productions in Gilman Hot Springs, California, she was ordered to have an abortion in order for the couple to remain in the Sea Org. "The order devastated both my wife and me. Our dedication as Sea Org members clashed violently with our intentions as parents and we went through a personal nightmare," said Prince in an affidavit filed in a legal case in Colorado. Scientology representatives at the time asserted that Prince's wife chose of her own volition to have an abortion, and was not forced to do so. Prince said that his wife was never the same after her abortion, and decided she wanted to leave Scientology. The couple left Scientology in 1992. Golden Era Productions general manager Ken Hoden told The Press-Enterprise that per Scientology policy, employees are not allowed to work at the Gilman Hot Springs facility if they have children under six years of age because the difficult work schedule would not permit the parents to spend sufficient time with their children. "We don't think it's right for parents to spend time away from their kids. Every person that says they have been coerced are saying it for another reason. Nobody is coerced into doing anything in the Church of Scientology. The purpose of Scientology is to increase a person's self-determinism," said Hoden. The director of public affairs for the Church of Scientology International, Aron Mason, said Prince's statements were motivated by financial reasons, and stated to The Press-Enterprise, "He is only existing because he gets paid to say the party line for people who are anti-Scientologists."

Betty Hardin, a former worker in the finance department at Golden Era Productions, has described routinely driving pregnant women to the Planned Parenthood center in Riverside, California, to obtain abortions and follow-up treatment. According to Hardin, she eventually got out of being the driver for the "abortion run" because the anti-abortion activists who often picketed the Planned Parenthood center saw her so often that they came to recognize her.

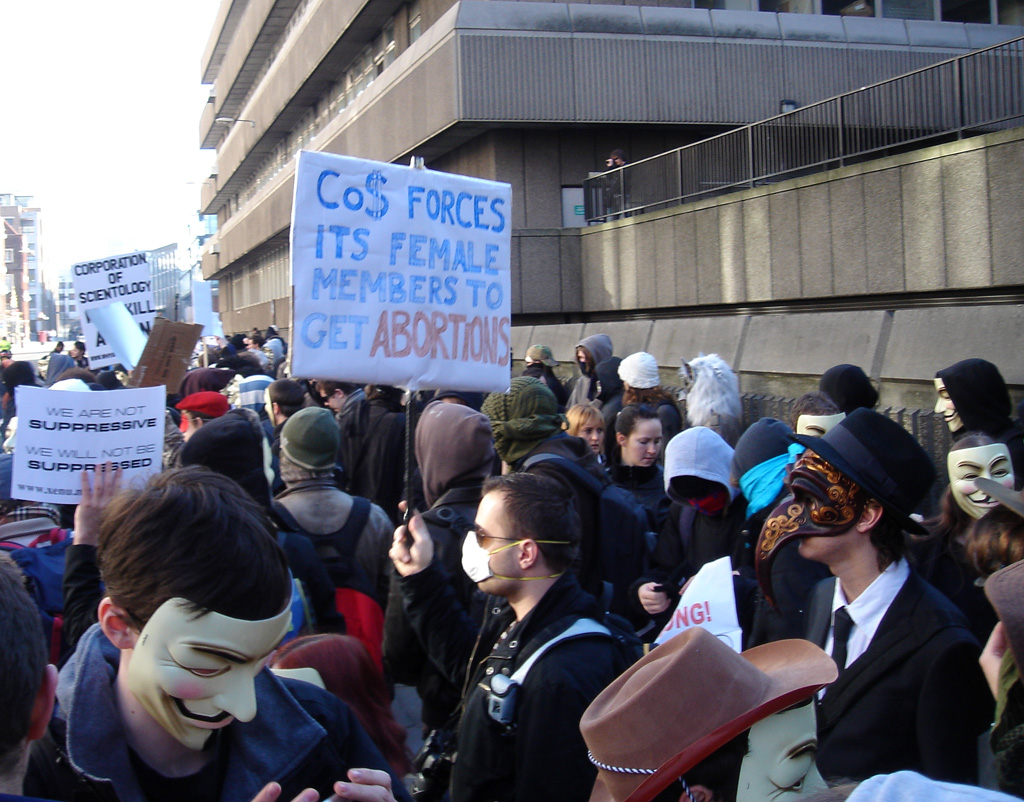
A protester holds a sign which reads: "C[hurch] o[f] S[cientology] forces its female members to get abortions". (February 10, 2008)

In 2001, former Scientologist Astra Woodcraft told the San Francisco Chronicle that she decided to attempt to get pregnant because she thought this would help her get out of Scientology, due to its practices with regard to abortion. "If you get pregnant, they'll send you to one of their smaller, lower-level organizations. In reality, you're very heavily pressured to get an abortion, but I figured it was my only way to get out," said Woodcraft. A bio page on a website Woodcraft created in 2008 said she "left Scientology for good when the church tried to pressure her to have an abortion". Scientology leaders told the San Francisco Chronicle that the organization does not have a policy on abortion, but instead leaves the decision up to the individual.

In 2003, The Times of India reported that "Forced abortions, beatings, starvation are considered tools of discipline in this church." In 2005, a former high-ranking member of the Sea Org told the New York Post, "It is estimated that there have been some 1,500 abortions carried out by women in the Sea Organization since the implementation of a rule in the late '80s that members could not remain in the organization if they decided to have children. And if members who have been in the Sea Organization for, say, 10 years do decide to have kids, they are dismissed with no more than $1,000" as a severance package. Former Scientologist and Sea Org member Karen Pressley recounted to Andrew Morton in the 2008 book Tom Cruise: An Unauthorized Biography that she was often asked by fellow Scientologists for loans so that they could get an abortion and remain in the Sea Org. "I had a real problem because I don't believe in abortion," said Pressley. She repeated the allegation in a book she wrote, detailing her escape from Scientology. Morton wrote that "Scientology officials reject as 'simply false' the assertion that Sea Org women are encouraged, as a matter of policy, to have abortions."

In April 2008, Astra Woodcraft appeared on the ABC News program Nightline along with Jenna Miscavige Hill, the niece of Scientology leader David Miscavige. Astra Woodcraft said that when she was about 17 years old, Scientology came up with a policy that Sea Org members could not have children. "If you get pregnant when you're in the Sea Org, you either have to leave or you get an abortion. I know people who have gotten like up to four abortions," said Hill. Astra's father Lawrence Woodcraft told Nightline, "She was very upset when she was about 16 or 17 and told me they suddenly decided to change the rules and Sea Org members were no longer allowed to have children." Two years later, Astra became pregnant, and she said that she was asked about this by a high-ranking member of the Sea Org, "A very high-level Sea Org member one day saw me and asked me what I was doing and I said I was leaving and I said I was pregnant and he said, 'Oh, is it too late for an abortion?' I didn't even know what to say in response."

Former Scientologist and actor Jason Beghe and former Scientologist and Sea Org member Marc Headley commented on issues of Scientology and abortion in September 2008 at a conference in Hamburg, Germany sponsored by Germany’s Department of Interior Affairs. "It is against the codes of Sea Org to have children. If a female staff member for some reason was married, and got pregnant, then she's basically forced or convinced to have an abortion. If she refuses to have an abortion, then she will be offloaded from the Sea Organization and in most cases, declared; and she will not be able to speak to any of her family or friends that are Scientologists," said Headley.

In 2009, husband and wife Marc and Claire Headley filed lawsuits against Scientology's Golden Era Productions, asserting the organization participated in human trafficking and violated United States labor law on the state and federal level. Claire Headley was an employee at Golden Era Productions from 1991 to 2005, and stated in the lawsuit that she worked "long, hard hours for illegal wages, was forced to have (two) abortions to keep her job and was subjected to violations of personal rights and liberties for the purpose of obtaining forced labor." Scientology representative Tommy Davis described the Headleys' lawsuits as "utterly meritless" in a statement to The Press-Enterprise. Davis said that "As members of the religious order called the Sea Organization, we have dedicated our lives to the service of the Scientology religion." He told The Press-Enterprise, "Here's the thing that's so disingenuous about (the lawsuits). When you join the Sea Organization, you know you are voluntarily signing up and becoming a part of a highly dedicated, highly disciplined, very regulated lifestyle as part of a religious order. It's tough. It's not meant to be easy."

Laura DeCrescenzo filed a lawsuit in 2009 against Scientology, in which she asserted the organization had engaged in "human trafficking, obstructing justice, employment violations, discrimination and violation of privacy". "There are two very different versions of Scientology. There is the Scientology as presented to the outside world and there is a different Scientology in which plaintiff lived and worked for approximately 13 years. In the Scientology world plaintiff experienced, 12-year-old children are taken from their homes, asked to sign employment contracts and put to work. Pregnant women are coerced to have abortions," wrote DeCrescenzo in her complaint. She asserted in the complaint that while in Scientology she was "coerced to have an abortion". The complaint stated, "At age 12, plaintiff signed her first 'Contract of Employment.' She left school, home and family to work for the Church of Scientology International. This required that plaintiff move to another state. She was married to a co-worker at age 16, became pregnant while still a minor and was coerced by CSI to have an abortion at age 17."

In March 2009, investigative journalist Nathan Baca of KESQ-TV interviewed former Scientologist Maureen Bolstad. Bolstad said that women who worked at Scientology's headquarters were forced to have abortions, or faced being declared a "Suppressive Person" by the organization's management. Bolstand told Baca, "If a woman gets pregnant, and does not abort the child, then they are declared a suppressive person. Because, it kind of started out gradually. At first, the thing was, the Church of Scientology International did not want to pay for child care." L. Ron Hubbard stated those declared suppressive persons, "cannot be granted the rights ordinarily accorded rational beings". As part of their protest movement against Scientology, in June 2009 the group Anonymous released a statement highlighting what it referred to as "abuses in the Sea Org", including "Child labor, coerced abortions, harsh working conditions, human trafficking, cruel punishment, disconnection of families", and asserted a "Cadet Org" for children within the Sea Org "was disbanded as unnecessary when abortions were made mandatory for Sea Org women."

Australian politician Nick Xenophon, an independent member of the Australian Senate, gave a speech to the Australian Parliament in November 2009, about statements he had received from former Scientologists. He said that he had been told members of the organization had coerced pregnant female employees to have abortions. "I am deeply concerned about this organisation and the devastating impact it can have on its followers," said Senator Xenophon, and he requested that the Australian Senate begin an investigation into Scientology. According to the letters presented by Senator Xenophon, the organization was involved in "ordering" its members to have abortions. Former Scientologist Aaron Saxton sent a letter to Senator Xenophon stating he had participated in coercing pregnant women within the organization to have abortions. "Aaron says women who fell pregnant were taken to offices and bullied to have an abortion. If they refused, they faced demotion and hard labour. Aaron says one staff member used a coat hanger and self-aborted her child for fear of punishment," said Senator Xenophon. Carmel Underwood, another former Scientologist, said she had been put under "extreme pressure" to have an abortion, and that she was placed into a "disappearing programme", after refusing. Underwood was the executive director of Scientology's branch in Sydney.

Former Scientologists Anna and Dean Detheridge of Sydney had been Scientology staffers for 17 years, and according to Senator Xenophon they had been "subjected to physical and mental abuse during their time with the organisation". The Senator said that, "Anna and Dean also provided evidence where information they and others have revealed to the church have been used to blackmail and control. They also provided more information about coerced abortions." Mike Ferriss, the head of Scientology in New Zealand, denied the claims of forced abortions, saying to 3 News "There are no forced abortions in Scientology and if Aaron Saxton or anyone else coerced someone into having an abortion then they are way outside of the Church's policy and ethical conduct. We respect human life and the rights of mother's and families in such matters. The Church does not intervene." In March 2010, former Scientologist Janette Lang stated that at age 20 she became pregnant by her boyfriend while in the organization, and her boyfriend's Scientology supervisors "coerced them into terminating the pregnancy". "We fought for a week, I was devastated, I felt abused, I was lost and eventually I gave in. It was my baby, my body and my choice, and all of that was taken away from me by Scientology," said Lang. Lang explained why she chose this time to come forward, "I'm speaking out today because the time has come for victims of Scientology to be heard." Scientology spokesperson Virginia Stewart rejected the statements made by Janette Lang, and asserted, "The Church of Scientology considers the family unit and children to be of the utmost importance and does not condone nor force anyone to undertake any medical procedure whatsoever."

== Commentary ==
In his book A Piece of Blue Sky, author Jon Atack commented, "A rather peculiar aspect of Dianetics: The Modern Science of Mental Health was Hubbard's emphasis on 'attempted abortions.'" Atack pointed out that Hubbard thought attempted abortions caused ulcers, and noted, "He had been suffering from a duodenal ulcer since 1943". Author George Malko wrote in Scientology: The Now Religion that "Hubbard's extensive discussion of things sexual, his concern with abortions, beatings, coitus under duress, flatulence which causes pressure on the foetus, certain cloacal references, all suggest to me a fascination which borders on the obsessive, as if he possessed a deep-seated hatred of women. All of them are being beaten, most of them prove to be unfaithful, few babies are wanted." Hubbard's interest in abortions was criticized in the 1965 Anderson Report as "a morbid preoccupation with matters relating to abnormal behaviour of women" and "a prurient and distinctly unhealthy attachment to abortions, rape, perversion, and similar matters."

"Children take people off-line, so they discourage members of the Sea Org from having children."

— J. Gordon Melton

New religions scholar J. Gordon Melton told the San Francisco Chronicle that Scientology discourages members of the Sea Org from having children. "They don't look at children as a resource, but as a problem. Children take people off-line, so they discourage members of the Sea Org from having children," said Melton. In the book New Religious Movements and Religious Liberty in America, Melton contributed a chapter, "A Contemporary Ordered Religious Community: The Sea Organization". In the piece, Melton commented on statements he had seen about Scientology and abortion in "anti-Scientology literature". Melton wrote, "It has been asserted in some anti-Scientology literature that the Church had, at least for a time period, demanded that any female Sea Org members who became pregnant obtain an abortion. I have been unable to find any verification of that allegation." Melton went on to assert, "Given the nature of the church, were this ever to have become a policy of the Sea Org, there would have undoutedly been a paper trail of documents which, if they existed, have never been produced."

In an article in the Marburg Journal of Religion, Stephen A. Kent discussed Scientology and abortion, writing "Because the attitude among some Sea Org leadership appears to be that children hinder adults from performing their vital assignments, researchers should not be surprised to learn of pressures that Sea Org women felt to either abort pregnancies or give-up children for adoption." He commented, "Taken together, the interviews, legal declarations, media accounts, and internal documents present troubling glimpses into the lives of Scientology's most committed members. Sea Org obligations override many personal and family obligations and responsibilities, and devotion to the Scientology cause often appears to take priority over the needs of children."

In a 1998 speech, attorney and Scientology critic Graham E. Berry commented on Mary Tabayoyan's affidavit about Scientology and abortion, "Mary Tabayoyan has testified as to how she and other Scientologists were ordered to have abortions; and I have argued before a court that that constitutes instructions to commit murder. At the very least, it denies a woman freedom of choice with regard to abortion. And why does Scientology do this? Because children require "Family Time" and "Family Time" interferes with production; the production of things that produce money." In a May 2009 speech before the cult monitoring organization FECRIS, Berry cited "forced abortions" among what he referred to as "Scientology’s many secular abuses and crimes".

== See also ==
- Scientology's second-dynamic topics:
  - Scientology and gender
  - Scientology and sexual orientation
  - Scientology and sex
  - Scientology and marriage
  - Silent birth
- Religion and abortion
- Abortion debate
- Minors and abortion
- Paternal rights and abortion
- Self-induced abortion
