= Scientology in Australia =

Religion in Australia

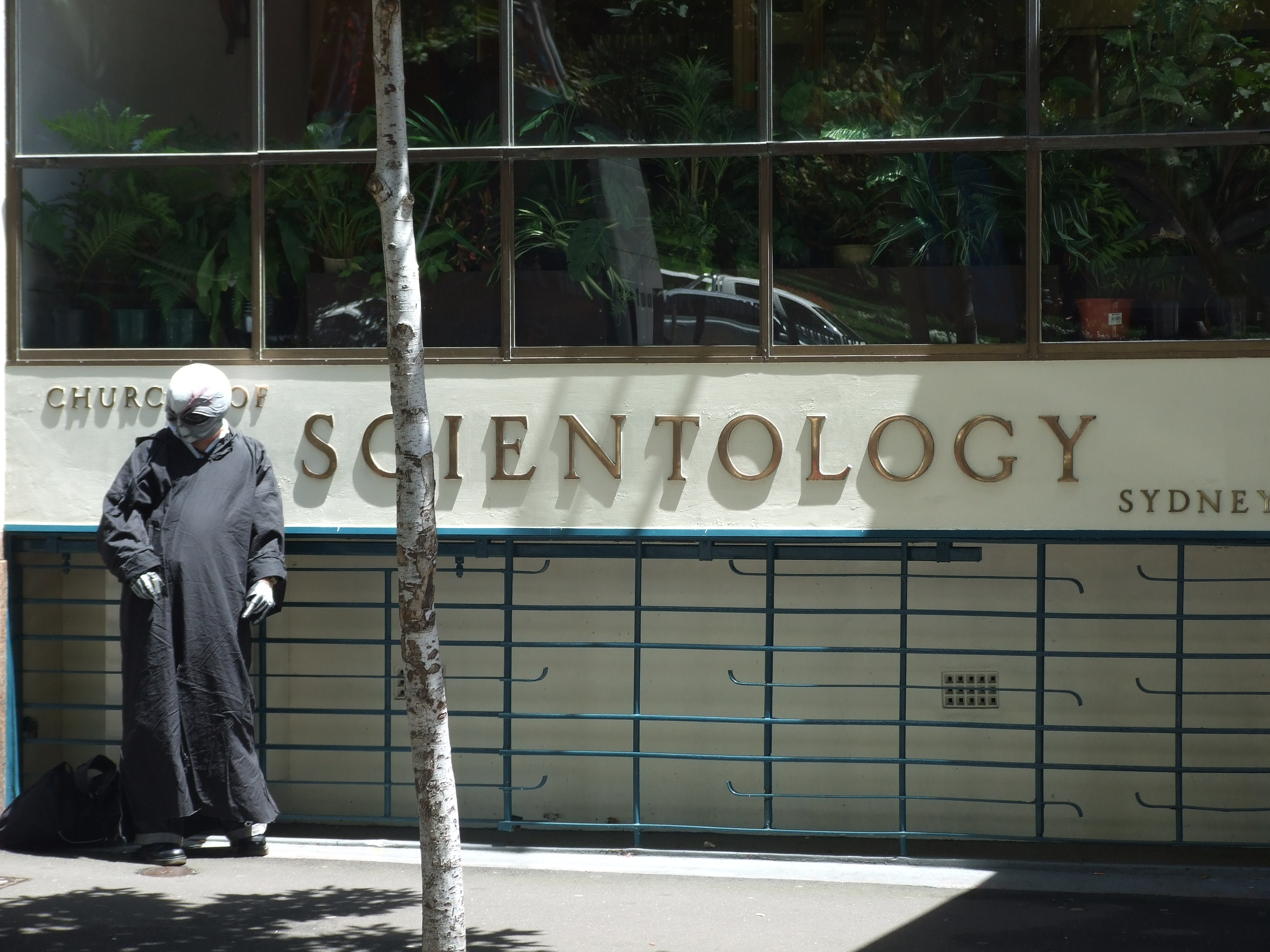
A protester, dressed as Xenu, stands next to a Scientology building in Sydney, Australia (2008)

Scientology has existed in Australia since the early 1950s. The number of Scientologists varies depending upon the source; according to the Australian Census, it has a declining population: 1,655 members in 2021, down from 1,681 in 2016 and 2,163 in 2011, while the Church of Scientology itself has claimed 150,000 members in Australia. It has organisations in Sydney, Melbourne, Perth, Adelaide, and Canberra, along with a mission in Tasmania and Brisbane. Church of Scientology Sydney is the regional headquarters for the entire Asian and Pacific area.

== Beginnings ==
As early as 1950, Dianetics was mentioned in Australia as "the latest craze in Hollywood" and the "Hubbard sub-mind method" was explained under the heading "World of Science". However, this also meant Hubbard, founder of the Dianetics Mental Health movement, was also newsworthy when his wife said he was "hopelessly insane" in their divorce case and this was reported in several major papers.

By the early 1950s, advertisements mentioning Scientology began to appear in newspapers. Scientology Associates (Mental Health) offered "professional psycho-therapeutic treatments" while for "Rev. John R. Farrell, Church of Scientology" it was "Personal Relations. – I will talk to anyone for you about anything". And in April 1954 the Hubbard Association of Scientologists International held the First Australian Scientology Congress in Prahran, Victoria, over four days, featuring "American Lecturers, John and Tuck Farrell, and English lecturer, Raymond Kemp, all Doctors of Scientology".

In 1959, L. Ron Hubbard travelled to Australia and delivered lectures on 7 to 8 November at the Melbourne Congress and the First Melbourne Advanced Clinical Course from 9 to 30 November.

== Legal status and government inquiries ==
Government criticism of the Church of Scientology was begun by a Victorian public servant, Eric Cunningham Dax, the founding chairman of the Mental Hygiene Authority of Victoria (later known as the Mental Health Authority). Giving testimony at the Anderson Report inquiry in 1964 he stated that "Since 1961 he had been increasingly concerned by information reaching the Mental Health Authority about people paying large sums of money for 'Scientology' courses." As part of these efforts, in 1962, Dax wrote to the Minister of Health in each Australian state, warning of what he considered to be the dangers of this new religion.

In November 1963, John Galbally, a member of the Victorian Legislative Council "accused the scientology movement of using blackmail and intimidation" which he said "could lead to suicides". Galbally proposed 'a Private Member's Bill to deal with scientology' and the following week the government announced a proposed inquiry.

=== 1965 Victorian Board of Inquiry into Scientology ===
Based on the findings of the 1965 Anderson Inquiry, to which Dax contributed, the Church of Scientology was restricted from forming under that name in Australia. The Attorney General in New South Wales was one of the first to act and, a week after the report was published, instructed the state's Registrar of Companies "not to register companies or firms with the word "scientology" in their names". The ban in Victoria lasted from 1965 until 1973, in South Australia from 1968 to 1973 and in Western Australia from 1968 until 1972. As a response to the banning of Scientology in Western Australia and South Australia, Scientology changed its name to the Church of the New Faith, a body incorporated in Adelaide in 1969, and continued to operate in those two states. However, it closed its Spring Street office in Melbourne, Victoria.

The magistrates in the 1983 Victorian Court actions (see below) referenced the Anderson Inquiry, particularly that it was "Uncompromising in its denunciation of Scientology as a profoundly evil movement from which gullible – and the not so gullible – members of the community required protection", that it had "gained publicity in countries and states where the organization was entrenched"; that the leaders of the Scientology movement succumbed to the temptation to avoid "destruction" of the movement by simulating, so as to become accepted as, a religion; that "the ecclesiastical appearance now assumed by the organization is no more than colourable in order to serve an ulterior purpose"; and, ultimately, that Scientology

"... is, in relation to its religious pretensions, no more than a sham. The bogus claims to belief in the efficacy of prayer and to being adherent to a creed divinely inspired and also the calculated adoption of the paraphernalia, and participation in ceremonies, of conventional religion are no more than a mockery of religion. Thus scientology as now practiced is in reality the antithesis of a religion. The very adriotness – and alacrity – with which the tenets or structure were from time so cynically adapted to meet a deficiency thought to operate in detraction of the claim to classification as a religion serve to rob the movement of that sincerity and integrity that must be cardinal features of any religious faith".

Anderson's tone was strident, but offered in his own defence:

If there should be detected in this Report a note of unrelieved denunciation of scientology, it is because the evidence has shown its theories to be fantastic and impossible, its principles perverted and ill-founded, and its techniques debased and harmful. [...] While making an appeal to the public as a worthy system whereby ability, intelligence and personality may be improved, it employs techniques which further its real purpose of securing domination over and mental enslavement of its adherents. It involves the administration by persons without any training in medicine or psychology of quasi-psychological treatment, which is harmful medically, morally and socially.

In Victoria this inquiry led to a ban and was legislated in the Psychological Practices Act, 1965, which prohibited using an E-meter or teaching Scientology for fee or reward. In the understanding that Scientology was a form of psychology, this law required anyone practising psychology to register with the newly established Victorian Psychological Council. However, it exempted any religious denomination recognised by the Australian government under the federal Marriage Act since it used a definition of psychology broad enough to include the counselling traditionally done by priests and ministers of religion. Although similar laws were later passed in Western Australia in 1968 (the Scientology Act) and South Australia (the Scientology (Prohibition) Act, 1968 replaced by the Psychological Practices Act, 1973), the Church remained active in these two States.

In January 1973, the newly elected federal Labor government recognised the Church of Scientology as a religious denomination under the Marriage Act, making it effectively exempt from the provisions of the Victorian Psychological Practices Act. Western Australia had already repealed its Scientology Act in the previous year.

On 25 February 1981, officials of Scientology urged repeal of the Victorian Psychological Practices Act, which was subsequently amended by the Psychologists Registration (Scientology) Act, 1982 to remove all references to Scientology. This act was repealed by the Psychologists Registration Act, 1987. The South Australian Psychological Practices Act has remained in force and has a necessary role in regulating the activities of psychologists and hypnotists in that state. However, neither this act itself nor the current regulations now contain any reference to Scientology. The Western Australian Scientology Act, 1968 was repealed in 1972, and replaced by a Psychologists Registration Act, 1976. with similar provisions to regulate psychologists.

=== 1983 Victorian Supreme Court ===
In 1983, the matter went to the courts in the State of Victoria and subsequently to the High Court of Australia. Scientologists argued a $70 payroll tax should not be paid due to its status as a religious organisation. The Commissioner of Pay-Roll Tax in Victoria had ruled that Scientology was not a religion. This decision was upheld in the Supreme Court of Victoria (Judge: Crockett, J) and then on appeal in the Full Court. The judgement concluding Scientology was not a religion relied on the premise that Scientology was a philosophy rather than a religion and that the trappings of religion had only been acquired after its establishment in order to give the organisation the semblance of a religion. Some support of this position was found in Scientologist writings: Scientology's predecessor in Australia was the Hubbard Association of Scientologist International ("H.A.S.I."). This association had published, at some time not earlier than 1961, a magazine which unequivocally asserted "H.A.S.I. is non-religious - it does not demand any belief or faith nor is it in conflict with faith. People of all faiths use Scientology."

The full bench of the Victorian Supreme Court affirmed that the

"Introduction of a service, ceremonies and other external indicia of a religion is no more than a cynical desire to present Scientology as what it is not for such mundane purposes as acquiring the protection of constitutional guarantees of freedom of religion or obtaining exemption from the burden of taxing laws... The creed and services described in a 1959 booklet called Ceremonies of The Founding Church of Scientology which had been published in America played absolutely no part in the teaching or practice of Scientology until the late nineteen sixties; These so-called ceremonies were devised and published as a device to enable, with such attendant advantages as would thereby accrue, Scientology to be paraded as a church in the United States and should properly be described as a masquerade and a charade."

Thus the Victorian court found that a considerable transformation had ostensibly occurred. The court found that "the ecclesiastical appearance now assumed by the organization is no more than colourable in order to serve an ulterior purpose", namely that the purpose of acquiring the legal status of a religion so that the organisation might have the fiscal and other benefits of that status in Australia and elsewhere and the purpose of avoiding the legal disabilities to which the organisation was subject by reason of the Psychological Practices Act 1965 (Vict.). He expressed his clear conviction that the purported transformation of Scientology to a religion was

"No more than a sham, the proclaimed belief in the efficacy of prayer is bogus, and the adoption of the paraphernalia and ceremonies of conventional religion is a mockery. The very adroitness – and alacrity – with which the tenets or structure were from time (to time) so cynically adapted to meet a deficiency thought to operate in detraction of the claim to classification as a religion serve to rob the movement of that sincerity and integrity that must be cardinal features of any religious faith."

Though the court found that at least some parts of Hubbard's writings contained merely pretended doctrines and practices of Scientology, he also found that members of the Scientology movement are "expected to and, apostates excepted, accord blind reverence to the written works of Mr. Hubbard. Although the sincerity and integrity of the ordinary members of the Scientology movement are not in doubt, Scientology is no less a sham because there are others prepared to accept and act upon such aims and beliefs as though they were credible when they can not see them for what they are. Gullibility cannot convert something from what it is to something which it is not".

=== 1983 High Court Appeal ===
All these judgements were subsequently overturned by the Scientologist's appeal to the High Court of Australia in 1983, in Church of the New Faith v. Commissioner of Pay-roll Tax. The court ruled that the government of Victoria could not deny the church the right to operate in Victoria under the legal status of "religion" for purposes of payroll taxes. All three judges in the case found that the Church of the New Faith (Church of Scientology) was a religion. Justices Mason and Brennan said:

Charlatanism is a necessary price of religious freedom, and if a self-proclaimed teacher persuades others to believe in a religion which he propounds, lack of sincerity or integrity on his part is not incompatible with the religious character of the beliefs, practices and observances accepted by his followers.

but that:

The question to which the evidence was directed was not whether the beliefs, practices and observances of the persons in ultimate command of the organization constituted a religion but whether those of the general group of adherents constituted a religion. The question which the parties resolved to litigate must be taken to be whether the beliefs, practices and observances which the general group of adherents accept is a religion.

Justice Murphy said:

Conclusion. The applicant has easily discharged the onus of showing that it is religious. The conclusion that it is a religious institution entitled to the tax exemption is irresistible.

and

The conclusion to which we have ultimately come is that Scientology is, for relevant purposes, a religion. With due respect to Crockett J. and the members of the Full Supreme Court who reached a contrary conclusion, it seems to us that there are elements and characteristics of Scientology in Australia, as disclosed by the evidence, which cannot be denied.

Wilson and Deane said:

Regardless of whether the members of the applicant are gullible or misled or whether the practices of Scientology are harmful or objectionable, the evidence, in our view, establishes that Scientology must, for relevant purposes, be accepted as "a religion" in Victoria. That does not, of course, mean either that the practices of the applicant or its rules are beyond the control of the law of the State or that the applicant or its members are beyond its taxing powers.

The High Court of Australia restored Scientology's tax exempt status in 1983. The High Court's decision, dismissing the earlier judgements, now serves as the current precedent for defining religious groups. As part of the court's judgment, according to scholar James Richardson: "the Court went on to state that a religion did not have to be theistic, and that a religion involved both belief and behavior, thus avoiding crude dichotomy promulgated by the famous polygamy case in America in 1897. The case is still the leading case in Australia defining religion, and is cited in other courts and countries as well."

=== 2009–2010 Parliamentary inquiry attempt (Nick Xenophon) ===
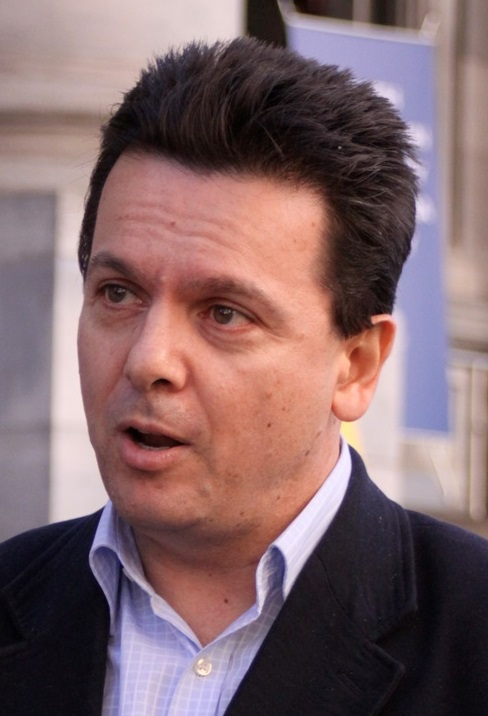
Senator Nick Xenophon in 2009

In November 2009, independent senator Nick Xenophon spoke in the parliament about the organisation, describing it as a "criminal organisation" and saying that he had letters from former followers which included "claims of abuse, false imprisonment and forced abortion". His staff interviewed a number of people who made the claims. Xenophon called for a parliamentary enquiry to investigate the Church's activities and its tax-exempt status.

In March 2010, Xenophon's call for an inquiry was "overwhelmingly rejected" by the Australian Senate, the senators voting 33 to 6 against with 37 abstentions; Xenophon said he would "continue to push for an inquiry when parliament reconvenes in May". Xenophon provided further details of his position when he spoke to his motion and Australian Greens senators Milne and Brown also spoke in support. Liberal Party Senator Eric Abetz and Cory Bernardi spoke against.

Australian Greens senators Sarah Hanson-Young, Scott Ludlam and Rachel Siewert joined Xenophon, Milne and Brown in voting for the motion.

Those senators who voted against the motion were:

- Judith Adams (LIB)
- Chris Back (LIB)
- Cory Bernardi (LIB)
- Catryna Bilyk (ALP)
- Mark Bishop (ALP)
- Sue Boyce (LIB)
- David Bushby (LIB)
- Doug Cameron (ALP)
- Jacinta Collins (ALP)
- Mathias Cormann (LIB)
- Trish Crossin (ALP)
- Don Farrell (ALP)
- David Feeney (ALP)
- Steve Fielding (FF)
- Mitch Fifield (LIB)
- Mary Jo Fisher (LIB)
- Michael Forshaw (ALP)
- Mark Furner (ALP)
- Annette Hurley (ALP)
- Steve Hutchins (ALP)
- Joe Ludwig (ALP)
- Kate Lundy (ALP)
- Gavin Marshall (ALP)
- Anne McEwen (ALP)
- Jan McLucas (ALP)
- Claire Moore (ALP)
- Fiona Nash (NAT)
- Stephen Parry (LIB)
- Louise Pratt (ALP)
- Nick Sherry (ALP)
- Glenn Sterle (ALP)
- Judith Troeth (LIB)
- Penny Wong (ALP)
- Dana Wortley (ALP)

On 22 June 2010, Senator David Feeney presented the report Persons referred to in the Senate – Ms Vicki Dunstan on behalf of the Church of Scientology Australia in parliament and moved that it be adopted. The report was a response "to comments made by Senators Xenophon, Milne and Bob Brown in the Senate on 11 and 18 March 2010 during debates to refer matters relating to the Church of Scientology" and was tabled to provide "a right of reply ... to persons who claim to have been adversely affected by being referred to, either by name or in such a way as to be readily identified, in the Senate". The effect of tabling the report was to enter the Church of Scientology's response to senators Xenophon, Christine Milne and Bob Brown, in full, into Hansard, the permanent public record of the Parliament of Australia.

On 2 May 2012, the speech caused controversy for reasons unrelated to Scientology when it was published by the Malaysian newspaper the New Straits Times in an article titled "Observer under scrutiny" on its website with the word "Scientology" replaced with "Islam" to give the impression that Xenophon made an anti-Islam speech in Parliament. In April, Xenophon had visited Malaysia to independently observe an anti-government protest known as the Bersih 3.0 rally and had also made his support for opposition leader Anwar Ibrahim known to the public. The article written by Roy See Wei Zhi was apparently intended to turn public opinion in the Muslim-majority country against Xenophon. Upon learning of the article, Xenophon threatened to sue the New Straits Times for defamation, this resulted in the paper removing the article from the website.

== Activities ==
=== Billboard promotion ===
The Church of Scientology used a promotion in Sydney for many years, an "electronic talking billboard" a 33-metre-high (108 ft) Volcano billboard situated in the main cinema district on George Street. The Volcano billboard was "33 metres wide, 10 metres high and projects three-and-a-half-metres from the Metro's facade. It is internally illuminated by 150 special display lamps synchronised to create a stylised simulation of lava flowing down the sides of the volcano. Each eruption heralds the screening of ads on the TV screen. Non-toxic smoke will spew from the crater at regular intervals." The billboard was used to promote the Dianetics book, which has featured the Scientology symbolism of the volcano on its cover since 1967.

=== Interaction with education ===
Through its group Citizens Commission on Human Rights, the Church of Scientology is active in the media about what it claims are the dangers of psychiatric drugs and the treatment of ADHD and has arranged at least one anti-psychiatry exhibition in Australia. That exhibition, which opened in Sydney in September 2006, was criticised by Christopher Pyne, then the federal government's parliamentary secretary for health with special responsibilities for mental health. Pyne told The Daily Telegraph:

"It's incredibly irresponsible ... What if a patient, after seeing this exhibition, decided to stop seeing a psychiatrist? The outcome could be tragic ... It's ill-informed and it's dangerous to undermine a highly respected and important part of the medical profession ... Patients who see a psychiatrist shouldn't have their faith in psychiatry shaken by crackpot claims."

In response, Shelly Wilkins, executive director of the exhibition "said the campaign was not against psychiatrists, but their treatments".

The Church of Scientology, through its group Narconon, has run an anti-drug campaign in dozens of schools in Melbourne, giving presentations and handing out brochures. Scientology members have also attended events like the Big Day Out to give out anti-drug information.

One school in Australia, the Athena School in Newtown, Sydney, uses Scientology study technology. The Athena School has 90 pupils ranging from pre-school to year 10. It has eight teachers who have completed six months' training in L. Ron Hubbard teaching techniques but do not hold formal qualifications. Some children at the school are involved in Scientology community outreach programs operating under different names, including Drug Free Ambassadors.

=== Propaganda sent to schools ===
In 2009, after Scientology related material was sent to New South Wales schools, the state government warned principals about a Church of Scientology attempt to infiltrate primary schools with propaganda videos and booklets aimed at Year 6 students. The NSW education minister, Verity Firth, warned all the state's primary schools after a DVD was distributed about a Scientology organisation called Youth for Human Rights. The DVD was sent to various schools for the students but did not reveal it was connected to the Church of Scientology. "It's not appropriate for the Church of Scientology to distribute materials", Firth said.

== Litigation ==
=== Cases ===
The Church of Scientology has been involved in a number of lawsuits and threatened legal action during its five decade history in Australia.

- A suit was brought against Kevin Victor Anderson and his assistant Gordon Just who produced the Anderson Report, in 1971. The citations in the Victorian reports are: Hubbard Association of Scientologists -v- Anderson (1971) VR 788; Hubbard Association of Scientologists v. Anderson (1972) VR 340 [appeal of 1971 VR 740]; Hubbard Association of Scientologists International v Anderson and Just (No 2) (1972) VR 577. The Victorian Parliament passed special legislation to give the two immunity from these writs.
- The Church of Scientology requested a tax exemption from wages originating from a religious institution based on the Victoria Pay-roll Tax Act 1971. The High Court asked the question on whether Scientology was to be accepted as a religion, and decided that they were. Scientology met the two criteria that they stipulated for the determination of whether an organization is religious; first "belief in a supernatural Being, Thing or Principle" and second, "the acceptance of canons of conduct in order to give effect to that belief."
- The Church of Scientology also litigated against the Australian Security Intelligence Organisation, which is Australia's domestic intelligence service.

=== Banning of Tom Cruise book by Australian book retailers ===
A 2008 book released detailing Tom Cruise's activities within Scientology was banned by the major Australian booksellers in Australia, including Dymocks and Angus and Robertson, after threats of legal action by the Church of Scientology. The book, Tom Cruise: An Unauthorized Biography by British writer Andrew Morton, had been pulled from sale in the UK, and made a number of claims against Cruise and claims about Scientology trying to influence Nicole Kidman. The Australian arm of publisher Pan Macmillan had planned to print a local Australian edition, but decided not to after legal advice that the Church (Note: Use of "Church" or "the Church" is a common shortened form of "Church of Scientology"; see The Church (Scientology).) would act against them. This resulted in the book not being stocked by the Borders chain in Australia. Though certain bookstores in Australia refused to sell the book due to legal concerns, it was the number one bestseller in Australia for publisher AbeBooks in 2008, and the number one most-borrowed non-fiction book at libraries in Brisbane in September 2008.

Tom Cruise: An Unauthorized Biography was published in January 2008, and reprinted with an update in February 2009. In a New York Times review, Janet Maslin wrote "... Mr. Morton has found a number of former Scientologists who are willing to speak freely, and in some cases vengefully, about the group's purported inner workings. Mr. Morton's eagerness to include their voices leads him to push the limits of responsible reporting." Maslin added that Morton "provides a credible portrait extrapolated from the actor's on-the-record remarks and highly visible public behavior." Writing in Entertainment Weekly, Mark Harris gave the book a grade of "C−", and said "Cruise emerges from Morton's takedown moderately scratched but as uncracked as ever." Another review in The New York Times by Ada Calhooun said:

However shady Scientology may be, Morton's language in "Tom Cruise: An Unauthorized Biography" is extreme. He and his sources compare the church and its leadership to fascists, the Roman Empire, storm troopers, Machiavelli, Orwell's "Animal Farm," Napoleon, Stalinists and North Korea. He also repeatedly invokes Nazism, and quotes without censure the German Protestant Church's comparison of Cruise to Joseph Goebbels.

Teresa Budasi of the Chicago Sun-Times described the book as "fascinating", although Budasi also brought up a "question as to what's true and what isn't." Budasi summed up her impression of the work, writing that "Morton's book is as much an indictment on Cruise's chosen faith as it is the life story of one of the world's biggest movie stars. And by the end you realize that 'Scientologist' is what will end up being the role of his lifetime." In a review in The Buffalo News, Jeff Simon wrote of the author: "To give Morton the credit he's clearly due: he is one of the best around at constructing a 250-page gossip column."

Upon its publication, Cruise's lawyer and the Church of Scientology released statements which question the truthfulness of assertions made by Morton in the book. In a 15-page statement released to the press, the Church of Scientology called the book "a bigoted, defamatory assault replete with lies". The book was not published in the UK, Australia or New Zealand due to strict libel laws in those countries.

== Controversies ==
=== Queen Street massacre ===
In the Queen Street massacre case, the gunman, Frank Vitkovic, had been tested by the Church of Scientology two months before he shot a number of people in the Queen Street massacre. "Vitkovic took a personality test carried out by a Church of Scientology volunteer. The results of the test, the Scientology volunteer believed, made her suspect that he might have hit rock bottom. The voluntary worker, Ms Eleanor Simpson, who had no formal training in psychology, believed Vitkovic was extremely depressed. She could recall only one other personality test having a worse result. She did not refer Vitkovic to a psychiatrist but suggested he enrol in the Ups and Downs in Life course run by the Church." Forensic psychiatrist Dr Alan Bartholomew presented evidence at the Inquest concerning Scientology's testing of gunman Frank Vitkovic. Bartholomew indicated that the Scientologist's testing of the gunman Frank Vitkovic, though revealing that Vitkovic was suffering a serious mental condition, did not result in his being treated effectively. Bartholomew also stated that the test itself may have contributed to Vitkovic's mental state before he shot eight people in 1988. While repeating some of these comments the Coroner said in his findings "there is no evidence that Vitkovic was influenced by his being provided with the written results of a Scientology Personality Test". The coroner also noted the day before coming into the Church of Scientology Vitkovic was prescribed "appropriate medication" for stress related headaches and hypertension. An alternative interpretation of events is provided by the director of the Australian Institute of Criminology, Adam Graycar:

In his diary, Vitkovic also confided this advice "Look for people with a history of rejection, loneliness and ill treatment who also have a fascination with guns and you won’t go wrong". The inquest exposed the tortured mind of a young man who saw himself as a failure, inadequate and lonely, tormented by violent fantasies and finally suffused with hatred. He sought refuge in erotic and violent books and videos and cultivated a morbid interest in firearms."

=== Revesby murder ===
Linda Walicki, who was diagnosed with a psychiatric illness, was not administered psychiatric drugs prescribed by the hospital because of the beliefs of her Scientologist parents. Instead her parents administered vitamins imported from the United States. Her condition worsened, and her parents became alarmed, finally relenting and administering the prescribed medicine. However, three weeks later in August 2007, she assaulted them, killing her father Michael and sister Kathryn, and wounding her mother Sue. The mother has since recovered.

After the incident, Australian Church of Scientology vice-president Cyrus Brooks in Sydney continued to criticise psychiatry and psychiatric drugs, while the Australian Medical Association president, Rosanna Capolingua, speaking on ABC radio, said that if "the girl had had access to appropriate medical treatment it could have changed the course of her life."

Walicki was found not guilty by reason of insanity in 2008 and was taken to a hospital for further treatment.

=== Sexual abuse coverup ===
Jan Eastgate, President of CCHR and winner of an International Association of Scientologists Freedom Medal award, has been implicated in covering up the sexual abuse of an 11-year-old girl in the Australian branch of the church. Eastgate was head of the Australian CCHR at the time and the girl was abused by her Scientologist stepfather between the ages of 8 and 11 years. Eastgate, who denied the allegations, labelling them "egregiously false", was arrested on 30 March 2011 on charges of perverting the course of justice but later released on conditional bail. All charges were dropped against Eastgate after an investigation by the New South Wales Director of Public Prosecution found that there was not enough substantiating evidence.

=== Hostage allegations ===
In February 2013, an Australian Broadcasting Corporation (ABC) television program, Lateline, accused the Church of Scientology of holding a Taiwanese woman, Alice Wu, in isolation at a Sydney property after she suffered an extreme mental breakdown. It was also suggested the Church had bullied her into signing legal statements she did not necessarily agree to.

=== Chatswood stabbing ===
On 3 January 2019, a 16-year-old boy stabbed two people at the Church of Scientology's Advanced Organization and Saint Hill ANZO in Chatswood, Sydney. The boy was being escorted from the property due to a domestic altercation with his mother the previous day. He and his mother were members of the Church though he disagreed with the teachings, they had been at the Chatswood centre since December 2018. Using a kitchen knife he stabbed two members of the Church: Chih-Jen "Aaron" Yeh, a 24-year-old Taiwanese man and a security guard. Police were called to the centre and upon arrival they drew tasers on the boy and ordered him to drop the knife to which he complied. He was arrested and taken to Chatswood Police Station. The victims of the stabbing were taken to Royal North Shore Hospital, the security guard suffered only minor lacerations but Yeh died of his injuries at the hospital.

The Church of Scientology stated that Yeh was a "beloved member" of the Church. Later, the head office in the US blamed Leah Rehmini's show Scientology and the Aftermath for influencing the boy's view of Scientology and inciting him to commit the stabbing. However, Australian defectors of Scientology expressed doubt of this and there was no evidence provided that the boy had watched the show.

The boy was charged with murder and wounding with intent to cause grievous bodily harm. In 2021, during his trial the boy was deemed to be suffering from schizophrenia and psychosis at the time of the stabbing and as a result he could not be held criminally responsible. Justice Hament Dhanji issued a verdict of "act proven but not criminally responsible".

== Notable members ==
A notable Australian member of the Church is the singer Kate Ceberano. Media tycoon James Packer has been involved with the Church but left in 2008. Aaron Saxton, a former member of Sea Org, rose to prominence as a whistleblower in 2009 when allegations he had made in his correspondence with Senator Xenophon were discussed in the Australian Senate, and Mike Rinder, a former senior executive-turned whistleblower who left after being imprisoned in The Hole for two years, and has since become a vocal activist against the Church. Other members include Lindy McNocher who is the owner of a company called Gallop Consulting based in Sydney. They were a member of the World Institute of Scientology Enterprises and they sold tools based on the Hubbard Management Business System [HMBS].

== See also ==
- Scientology status by country
- Religion in Australia
