= Scientology and homosexuality =

LGBTQ topics in Scientology

Scientology opposes same-sex marriage and its founder L. Ron Hubbard called homosexuality a dangerous perversion. The Church of Scientology's perspectives on homosexuality are based on the writings of its founder, and his statements about homosexuality have led critics to state that Scientology promotes homophobia, and being gay or accused of being gay is viewed as negative in the Scientology community. According to a 2018 source, currently used, updated editions of Hubbard's canonical book, Dianetics, continue to use heteronormative and anti-gay language and list gay people as perverts who are physically ill and extremely dangerous to society. Some critics have stated that the Church (Note: Use of "Church" or "the Church" is a common shortened form of "Church of Scientology"; see The Church (Scientology).) tried to change their gay attractions through forms of therapy.

== Overview ==
Scientology opposes same-sex marriage and its founder called homosexuality a dangerous perversion. Being gay or accused of being gay is viewed as negative in the Scientology community. Journalist Roy Wallis said Scientologists sent messages to his friends stating he was a homosexual in retaliation for him publishing material critical of the organization in 1976.". In the 1960s Hubbard instituted intensive audits called security checks designed to seek out subversive tendencies in adherents which asked, in part, if they had "ever practiced homosexuality".

=== Hubbard's son ===
Jon Atack and others report that L. Ron Hubbard's son Quentin Hubbard was homosexual. According to Atack, L. Ron Hubbard had repeatedly announced that his son Quentin would succeed him after his death, but Quentin died of an apparent suicide in 1976.

=== Hubbard's writings ===
==== Dianetics ====
In 1950 Hubbard published Dianetics: The Modern Science of Mental Health, introducing his "science of the mind", Dianetics. He classified homosexuality as an illness or sexual perversion, citing contemporary psychiatric and psychological textbooks to support his view:

The sexual pervert (and by this term Dianetics, to be brief, includes any and all forms of deviation in Dynamic II [i.e., sexuality] such as homosexuality, lesbianism, sexual sadism, etc., and all down the catalog of Ellis and Krafft-Ebing) is actually quite ill physically... he is very far from culpable for his condition, but he is also far from normal and extremely dangerous to society...

==== Science of Survival ====
Hubbard further defined perversion in his 1951 book Science of Survival: Prediction of Human Behavior, where he introduced the concept of the "tone scale", a means of classifying individuals and human behavior on a chart running from +40 (the most beneficial) to −40 (the least beneficial). Sexual perversion, a category in which he included homosexuality, was termed "covert hostility" and given a score of 1.1, "the level of the pervert, the hypocrite, the turncoat, [...] the subversive". He considered such people to be "skulking coward[s] who yet contain enough perfidious energy to strike back, but not enough courage ever to give warning". In discussing homosexual people along with others at or below a 2.0 on the tone scale he stated followers should "dispose of them quietly and without sorrow" and that "it is only necessary to delete those individuals who range from 2.0 down, either by processing them enough to get their tone level above the 2.0 line ... or simply quarantining them from the society."

He characterized "promiscuity, perversion, sadism, and irregular practices" as well as "free love, easy marriage and quick divorce" as being undesirable activities, "since it is non-survival not to have a well ordered system for the creation and upbringing of children, by families". Such "sexual perverts" engaged in "irregular practices which do anything but tend toward the creation of children" and "efforts [which] tend not towards enjoyment but toward the pollution and derangement of sex itself so as to make it as repulsive as possible to others and so to inhibit procreation".

Hubbard's 1951 book Handbook for Preclears likewise classified homosexuality as "about 1.1 (covert hostility) on the tone scale", along with "general promiscuity". He set out what he saw as the cause of homosexuality: a mental "aberration", with the result that "an individual aberrated enough about sex will do strange things to be a cause or an effect. He will substitute punishment for sex. He will pervert others. Homosexuality comes from this manifestation and from the manifestation of life continuation for others." The "aberration" was caused by a child trying to "continue the life" of a dominant parent of the opposite sex.

=== Ruth Minshull's book ===
Hubbard's views on homosexuality were further explained in a 1972 book by Scientologist Ruth Minshull, How To Choose Your People, which was published through the Church of Scientology, copyrighted to Hubbard, and given "issue authority" by the Scientology hierarchy. Scientology churches sold the book alongside the works of Hubbard until 1983. Minshull described the "gentle-mannered homosexual" as a classic example of the "subversive" 1.1 personality, commenting that they "may be fearful, sympathetic, propitiative, griefy or apathetic. Occasionally they manage an ineffectual tantrum." Minshull stated they were social misfits:

Homosexuals don't practice love; 1.1s can't. Their relationships consist of: 1) brief, sordid and impersonal meetings or 2) longer arrangements punctuated by dramatic tirades, discords, jealousies and frequent infidelity. It could hardly be otherwise since the tone is made up of suspicion and hate, producing a darling sweetness interspersed with petty peevishness. Their "love" turns to deep contempt eventually.

Homosexuals had no redeeming "social value", in Minshull's view. She cautioned that "homosexuals should not be abused or ridiculed. But a society bent on survival must recognize any aberration as such and seek to raise people out of the low emotion that produces it."

== Attempts to change sexual orientation ==
There is some evidence that Hubbard's Dianetics movement sought to use Dianetics to "cure" homosexuality. In January 1951, the Hubbard Dianetic Research Foundation of Elizabeth, New Jersey, published a booklet of results from psychometric tests conducted on 88 people undergoing Dianetics therapy. It presents case histories and a number of X-ray plates to support statements that Dianetics had cured "aberrations" including bipolar disorder, asthma, arthritis, colitis, and "overt homosexuality", and that after Dianetic processing, test subjects experienced significantly increased scores on a standardized IQ test.

In Hubbard's 1951 book Handbook for Preclears, he set out instructions for Dianeticists to "cure" homosexuality. After stating that the cause of homosexuality was a fixation on a dominant parent of the opposite sex, he advised, "Break this life continuum concept by running sympathy and grief for the dominant parent and then run off the desires to be an effect and their failures and the homosexual is rehabilitated."

Hubbard urged society to tackle the issue of "sexual perversion" (including homosexuality), calling it "of vital importance, if one wishes to stop immorality, and the abuse of children". In Science of Survival, he called for drastic action to be taken against sexual perverts, whom he rated as "1.1 individuals":

Such people should be taken from the society as rapidly as possible and uniformly institutionalized; for here is the level of the contagion of immorality, and the destruction of ethics; here is the fodder which secret police organizations use for their filthy operations. One of the most effective measures of security that a nation threatened by war could take would be rounding up and placing in a cantonment, away from society, any 1.1 individual who might be connected with government, the military, or essential industry; since here are people who, regardless of any record of their family's loyalty, are potential traitors, the very mode of operation of their insanity being betrayal. In this level is the slime of society, the sex criminals, the political subversives, the people whose apparently rational activities are yet but the devious writhings of secret hate.

In later years, Hubbard sought to distance himself from efforts to regulate the sexual affairs of lay Scientologists. In a 1967 policy letter, he declared: "It has never been any part of my plans to regulate or to attempt to regulate the private lives of individuals. Whenever this has occurred, it has not resulted in any improved condition... Therefore all former rules, regulations and policies relating to the sexual activities of Scientologists are cancelled." Members of the Sea Org remained under strict rules according to a 1978 order.

== Current Scientology viewpoints ==
Although Hubbard's views on homosexuality remain unamended in modern editions of Scientology books, gay Scientologists have argued that Hubbard and the Church of Scientology have set aside any anti-homosexual views expressed in the past. In 2003, in the city of Los Angeles, the Church of Scientology sponsored a Multathlon for Human Rights and Tolerance. Keith Relkin, a gay activist and Scientologist, turned over a rainbow flag to the team captain who was running 250 miles through the metropolis. The American Church of Scientology published a press release on its website quoting gay activist Keith Relkin as saying, "Over the years I have worked with the Church of Scientology for greater inclusion of gay people like me, and today represents a milestone in that progress."

Paul Haggis, a Hollywood screenwriter and director, publicly left Scientology in October 2009, stating that the San Diego branch of the Church of Scientology gave its support to California Proposition 8, which sought to ban same-sex marriage. Haggis wrote to Tommy Davis, the Church's spokesman, and requested that he denounce their support for Prop 8. However, the Church disputes this, with Davis stating, "Church of Scientology San Diego had been put on a list of churches that supported Proposition 8 out in California. It was incorrectly included and named when it should have never been on the list to begin with." Davis also stated that the inclusion of the San Diego branch on the list supporting Prop. 8 was the work of a single employee, who was removed from his post and the Church's name taken off the list.

A 2004 article in the St. Petersburg Times reported that the Church defines marriage as the union between a man and a woman.

Melissa M. Wilcox, professor in Religious Studies at UC Riverside, states in Introduction to New and Alternative Religions in America that while present-day detractors of Scientology accuse it of homophobia, government suspicion in the early days of Scientology apparently included accusations of homosexuality. In response to a query by her about the Church's current position, the Church of Scientology in 2005 stated:

The Church of Scientology does not dictate sexual preferences. Scientology is a practical method of improving conditions in life and works to increase a person's abilities, give higher IQ and better reaction time, greater ability to solve his problems in life – things of this nature.

An official Scientology website states, "The second dynamic is the urge toward existence as a future generation. It has two compartments: sex; and the family unit, including the rearing of children." "A culture will go by the boards if its basic building block, the family, is removed as a valid building block. So one can be fairly sure that he who destroys marriage destroys the civilization."

== See also ==
- Scientology's second-dynamic topics:
  - Scientology and gender
  - Scientology and sex
  - Scientology and abortion
  - Scientology and marriage
  - Silent birth
- Hollywood Undercover
