= Tampion (surname) =

Tampion is a surname. Notable people with the surname include:

- Andrew Tampion (born 1984), Australian golfer
- Ian Tampion (1938–1997), Australian rules footballer
