= Athena School =

Scientology-affiliated school in NSW

Location
- Newtown, New South Wales; Australia; 33°53′44.04″S 151°10′28.10″E

Information
- School type: Private comprehensive coeducational school
- Motto: Persistence – Integrity – Understanding
- Established: 1987
- Grades: K–10
- Website: athena.nsw.edu.au

The Athena School is an independent, co-educational school for Preschool to Year 10 students located in Newtown, an inner western suburb of Sydney, New South Wales, Australia. The school is registered by the NSW Education Standards Authority and is a member of the NSW Association of Independent Schools.

The Athena School was founded in 1986 by a group of parents who sought a more personalised approach to education. Concerned that students were often taught with a one-size-fits-all methodology, they established a school where instruction would be tailored to each child's level. A core founding principle was the implementation of systematic, phonics-based literacy instruction.

The Athena School is located on the heritage premises of the former St Joseph’s Primary School and Convent, featuring large camphor laurel and eucalyptus trees that provide a naturally shaded environment.

The teaching approaches of the school are based on the works of L. Ron Hubbard.

== Affiliation with Scientology ==
The school is licensed by Applied Scholastics, a company wholly owned by the Church of Scientology, which licenses the study methods of Scientology founder L. Ron Hubbard. The school asserts its affiliation with Scientology is non-religious.

Since 2007, all teachers are registered with the Board of Studies, Teaching and Educational Standards. The Athena School follows the guidelines set out by the NSW Board of Studies in its curriculum.

In March 2010 the Greens New South Wales party lodged an official complaint about the school to the Australian Competition & Consumer Commission due to an advertising leaflet which fails to reveal the school's link to Scientology. The Principal of the school said the Applied Scholastics study method did not teach the Scientology religion, "We follow the Board of Studies curriculum. We use the study method of L. Ron Hubbard. It is a method of study, it is not teaching Scientology."

== Green School program with Street Coolers ==
In 2015 the school started a "green school" program with Street Coolers, a community-focused organisation with a mission to cool our urban areas. This involved the school utilising several machines capable of creating several kilograms of compost per day, a reverse-vending machine open to the public, which allows individuals to recycle plastic bottles and aluminium cans for coupons, as well as energy and weather monitoring to assess power usage and how the weather affects this.

== See also ==
- Scientology in Australia
- List of non-government schools in New South Wales
