= Anderson Report =

Australian investigation into Scientology

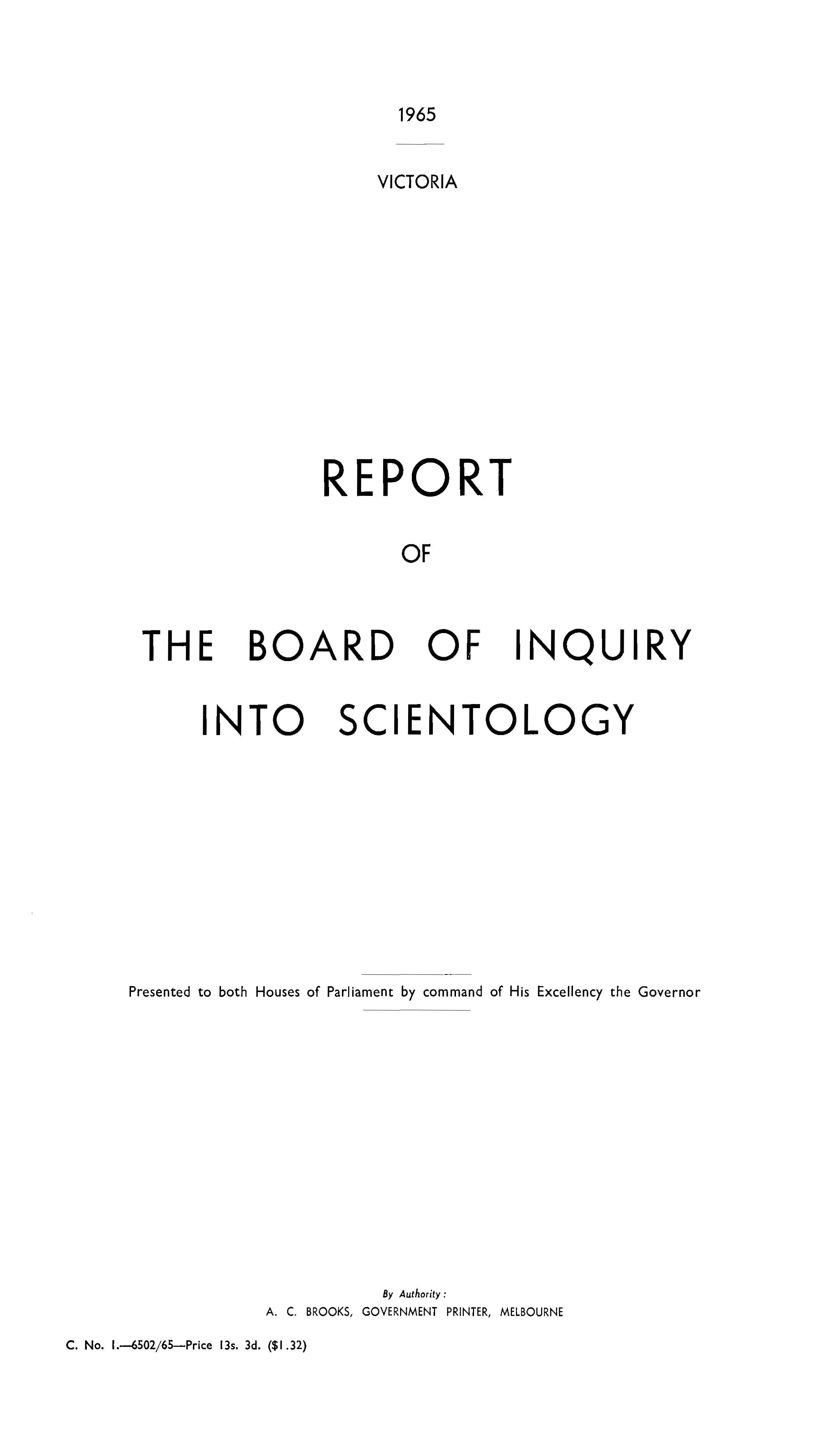

The Anderson Report is the colloquial name of the report of the Board of Inquiry into Scientology, an official inquiry into the Church of Scientology conducted for the State of Victoria, Australia. It was written by Kevin Victor Anderson QC and published in 1965. The report led to legislation attempting to ban Scientology in Victoria and similar legislation in several other States of Australia. No convictions were made under the legislation and Scientologists continued to practice their beliefs, although the headquarters was moved to South Australia. The legislation has been repealed in all States and subsequently Scientology was found to be a religion by the High Court of Australia.

== Background ==
In 1959, L. Ron Hubbard had set up the Church's headquarters at Saint Hill a few miles from East Grinstead in West Sussex, England. The Church of Scientology had spread from its origin in USA to a number of other English-speaking countries and soon attracted attention. Several official inquiries were made into Scientology in England, Australia, and elsewhere and a number of reports published by respective governments in the late sixties and early seventies. The Anderson Report was the first of these.

The Victorian Legislative Council appointed a Board of Inquiry on 27 November 1963 in response to a Private Member's Bill proposed by John Galbally to prohibit Scientology in the State. At this time the Church was represented in Melbourne by the Hubbard Association of Scientologists International (HASI), which had premises at 157-159 Spring Street.

== The Board of Inquiry ==
A Board of Inquiry does not have the same legal status as a trial. It is not necessarily presided over by a judge or a magistrate and does not sit in a courtroom; witnesses are not subpoenaed but appear by invitation. It is not bound by the rules of evidence. The Board of Inquiry into Scientology consisted of Mr Anderson sitting alone, assisted by Mr. Gordon Just who was instructed by the Victorian Crown Solicitor. After an initial sitting on 6 December 1963, the Board sat in the theatrette of the National Herbarium of Victoria from 17 February 1964 to 21 April 1965.

The HASI was represented by counsel J.R. O'Shea and I.G. Abraham, who called as witnesses HASI staff members and many individuals who had received Scientology training and counselling. HASI files and publications were also tendered in evidence. Counsel withdrew from the hearings on 12 November 1964 on their clients' instructions.

Two former Scientologists, Phillip Wearne and Douglas Moon, appeared as the main witnesses for the Committee for Mental Health and National Security (an ad hoc unincorporated organisation opposed to Scientology). They were represented by counsel Warren Fagan. Wearne, a publisher from South Yarra, told the inquiry that 'Scientologists planned to take over Australia, after establishing a "Scientology Government"' and that 'he first heard of the plan to take over Australia in 1960'. The method to be used 'was to infiltrate Government departments, political parties and other institutions, with scientologists getting jobs in these organisations', then 'after the move to "clear Australia" was completed, the aim was to take over the world'. Wearne said 'he was in a key position to carry out the scientology organisation's work as he had extensive connections in the Labour Party and Trade Union movements'. He also recalled 'a hallucination' that had 'developed after a "scientology processing"' in which he was eaten by a giant spider.

Psychiatrist Dr. Ian Holland Martin, honorary federal secretary of the Australian and New Zealand College of Psychiatrists, gave evidence that the E-Meter 'used for Scientology' was a 'psycho-galvano-meter' and was 'dangerous in unqualified hands'. He said that if the E-meter 'was suggested to possess mysterious powers' to someone who did not understand that it had 'been thoroughly discredited as a lie detector' then 'that person would be suggestible to ideas foisted on him by the operator'. As a result, 'This kind of influence would heighten latent paranoic trends in persons who showed no significant emotional disturbance'. He also testified that the then 'world director' of Scientology L. Ron Hubbard 'showed paranoid delusions in his claim to have visited Venus and been in the Van Allen radiation belt around the earth'.

Dr Eric Cunningham Dax, Chairman of the Mental Health Authority of Victoria, and one of his staff, Dr. M.B. Macmillan, coordinated the evidence given by expert witnesses in medicine and psychiatry. Dax also conferred with Wearne before the latter gave evidence at the Inquiry.

In his own evidence to the inquiry Dax stated 'The Mental Health Authority did not wish to attack people for their belief...whatever they were, so long as they did not try to influence other people for purposes injurious to mental health'. '"Scientology adherents' were 'sincere believers who were uncritical of the scheme's principles' and '"Scientology subjected them to a form of blackmail' and 'brain-washing methods'. Dax described Scientology as 'a calculated money-raising scheme by false propaganda' and that 'Since 1961 he had been increasingly concerned by information reaching the Mental Health Authority about people paying large sums of money for "Scientology" courses'.

== The Report ==
The Anderson Report concluded that "Scientology is a delusional belief system, based on fiction and fallacies and propagated by falsehood and deception" and that it "is not, and does not claim to be, a religion".He continues:

Scientology is evil, its techniques evil, its practice a serious threat to the community, medically, morally and socially, and its adherents sadly deluded and often mentally ill."

Anderson acknowledged the emotional tone of his report, justifying it as follows:

If there should be detected in this Report a note of unrelieved denunciation of scientology, it is because the evidence has shown its theories to be fantastic and impossible, its principles perverted and ill-founded, and its techniques debased and harmful. [...] While making an appeal to the public as a worthy system whereby ability, intelligence and personality may be improved, it employs techniques which further its real purpose of securing domination over and mental enslavement of its adherents. It involves the administration by persons without any training in medicine or psychology of quasi-psychological treatment, which is harmful medically, morally and socially.

Responses from government representatives across Australia to both to the findings of the report, and on the subject of scientology in general, were reported the following day. The Premier of Victoria Henry Bolte, who had set up the inquiry, described it as 'conclusive enough for action to be taken'. In New South Wales, the Minister for Health said that scientology 'had no proper background or scientific basis' and he would 'take such steps as are necessary to stop this organisation from taking root and gaining influence in the community'. In Western Australia, Dr. A. S. Ellis, Director of Mental Health Services, described scientology as 'a dangerous pseudo-science which catered for emotional cripples'. He added that scientologists were 'credulous, insecure and neurotic people who were looking for a prop' and scientology gave this to them 'at a price' but raised 'false hopes' and delayed 'proper psychiatric treatment'.

== Scientology response ==
In October 1965, Scientology founder L. Ron Hubbard was quoted as saying that the Board of Inquiry into Scientology was a 'kangaroo court' because 'They had their conclusions drawn long before they held the first hearing'. He suggested that the inquiry was 'illegal in its conduct under common law' and that anything similar in England would be 'laughed out of existence'. He put this down to Australia being 'young'. He added:

In 1942, a senior naval officer in Northern Australia, by a fluke of fate, I helped save them from the Japanese. For the sake of scientology there I will go on helping them. They have a lot to learn. I feel sorry for them. They are afraid.

The 'Hubbard Communications Office' at Saint Hill Manor in England also issued a statement criticizing the inquiry process and threatening legal action. They claimed Hubbard 'was forbidden to appear at the hearing' and that testimony from him and 'our witnesses' were not heard. They argued 'The people investigating it are religiously biased' and that 'witnesses of the opposition' had been allowed to collude 'before the hearing'. They also stated 'We intend to sue any paper publishing the findings as an accessory to libel and slander'.

In 1967 the Church of Scientology published Kangaroo Court, a critique of the conduct of the Board of Inquiry, alleging collusion between witnesses and alleging bias by Anderson and Dax.

A suit was brought against Anderson and his assistant Gordon Just who produced the report, in 1971. The citations in the Victorian Reports are: Hubbard Association of Scientologists v Anderson [1971] VR 788; Hubbard Association of Scientologists v Anderson [1972] VR 340 (appeal from [1971] VR 740); Hubbard Association of Scientologists International v Anderson and Just (No 2) [1972] VR 577. The Victorian Parliament passed special legislation to give the two immunity from these writs.

Jane Kember, a senior Scientologist who was later convicted on several criminal charges in relation to Scientology's 'Operation Snow White' tried to get the report removed from a library. She wrote a memo about 'handling' Paulette Cooper (and her critical book about Scientology) in 1972. Part 12 of the memo asks:

The library in D.C. has a copy of the Melbourne Inquiry Report. Paulette recommends this. Why is the copy still there? Please get it removed"

== Controversy ==
The Anderson Report is regarded by some as controversial, as evidenced in the Australian Government's Human Rights and Equal Opportunity Commission report regarding freedom of religion and belief. The Anderson Report was the basis of the Psychological Practices Act, 1965. However, this Act was amended in 1982 to remove all references to Scientology and was repealed in 1987.

== See also ==
- Scientology in Australia

Similar reports were conducted in:

- England – The Foster Report (Enquiry into the Practice and Effects of Scientology)
- New Zealand – The Dumbleton-Powles Report (Report of the Commission of Inquiry into the Hubbard Scientology Organisation in New Zealand)
- Canada – The Lee Report (Sectarian Healers and Hypnotherapy)
