= Aaron Saxton =

New Zealand critic of Scientology (born 1941)

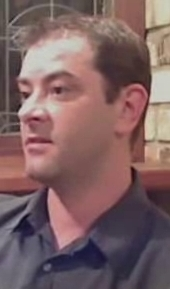
- Aaron Saxton in 2009
- Born: 1974 (age 51–52); New Zealand
- Known for: Whistleblower against Scientology

Aaron Saxton (born 1974) is a former Scientologist and member of the Church of Scientology's innermost group called the Sea Org. He contacted Senator Nick Xenophon of Australia, who quoted statements by Saxton about Scientology into the parliamentary record of the Australian Senate in November 2009. That speech caused a furor according to The Courier-Mail, The New Zealand Herald and other media.

== Scientology official in Australia and United States ==
A New Zealander, Aaron Saxton's parents were Scientologists. Saxton's father committed suicide when he was 14, and this had a significant impact on him. At age 15 he joined the Scientology group called the Sea Org, an elite unit within the organisation. After joining Scientology staff, Saxton moved to work with the organisation in Sydney, Australia. Saxton's mother signed over guardianship of her son to Scientology when he was 16 years old. Saxton was assigned to become a security officer for the organisation. According to Saxton staff in Scientology were not given sufficient drugs or medical attention, and so he removed his own teeth without usage of medication for pain.

Saxton received influential positions within the organisation, both in Sydney and the United States. Senator Nick Xenophon stated that Saxton "rose to a position of influence in Sydney and the United States" within Scientology. The Sydney Morning Herald reported that Saxton "rose to a senior level" within the Sea Org, 3 News characterised the Sea Org as "Scientology's senior management". The Editor-in-Chief of The Village Voice reported that Saxton served as "one of the Sea Org's ruthless enforcers during the 1990s". In their book Cults and New Religions, Douglas E. Cowan and David G. Bromley describe the Sea Org writing, "Described by the Church as 'a fraternal religious order,' members of the Sea Org 'occupy the most essential and trusted positions in the senior churches in the Scientology hierarchy'." Rolling Stone wrote, "Sea Org members staff all of the senior ecclesiastic positions in the church hierarchy". In 2010, there were 5,000 members in the Sea Org.

Between 1989 and 1996, Saxton worked for the Church of Scientology of Australia, as well as at the headquarters of Scientology in the U.S. In 1991, Saxton was assigned to work at Scientology facilities in Florida. While in the Sea Org, Saxton spent the majority of his time assigned to Scientology facilities in Los Angeles. While there he worked at the division of International Management for Scientology. He also functioned within the organisation as an Ethics Officer, and worked out of the Communications Office.

In this role, Saxton learned policies relating to Scientology's Flag Organization and its Office of Special Affairs. While a member of the Commodore's Messenger Organization (CMO), Saxton tried to make sure those under his supervision had adequate nourishment. As a recruiter for the CMO, Saxton tried to get Scientologists between ages 13 to 14 to join the organisation. Saxton left Scientology in 2006. He came to question why he had done some of the actions within the Sea Org that he later came to regret. He felt ashamed for what he had witnessed, as well as the part he played in controversial acts in the organisation.

== Whistleblower against Scientology ==
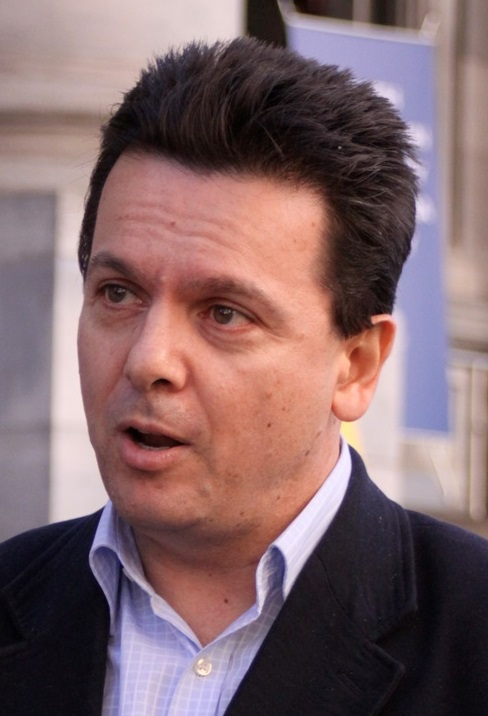
Australian Senator Nick Xenophon read Saxton's statements about Scientology into the public record.

In 2009, Saxton lived in Perth, Australia, and worked as an information technology contractor. He contacted Senator Nick Xenophon of Australia, who read statements by Saxton about Scientology into the parliamentary record of the Australian Senate. In a November 2009 speech, Xenophon said, "Aaron has now left the organisation and is willing to cooperate with police investigations into these matters." Senator Xenophon characterised Saxton as a "victim" of Scientology that had written to him about the organisation. Saxton's statement was tabled in Australian parliament.

Xenophon said, "In his statement Aaron also says he was forced to participate in the illegal confinement and torture of a follower who was kept under house arrest. ... He says while under control of Scientology he was involved in coercing female followers to have abortions (because) ... this was in line with a policy designed to keep followers loyal to the organisation and to allow them to keep working for the organisation." He read into the record, "Aaron says women who fell pregnant were taken to offices and bullied to have an abortion. If they refused, they faced demotion and hard labour ... Aaron says one staff member used a coat-hanger and self-aborted her child for fear of punishment. He says she was released from the organisation and the files were destroyed." Saxton said that while a member of the Scientology organisation, he had participated in actions including torture and blackmail. He stated that Scientology members deemed to be underperforming in their tasks were ordered to eat rations of beans and rice.

According to Xenophon, Saxton said he had participated in the "forced confinement and torture" of a woman in Scientology who had been relocated to a rural area in New South Wales. Senator Xenophon stated Saxton was, "ordered by superiors to remove documents that would link a Scientology staff member to murder". While an official for Scientology, Xenophon stated Saxton had "ordered more than 30 people to be sent to Scientology's work camps, where they were forced to undertake hard labour". While in the organisation, Saxton had access to Auditing files on celebrity Scientologists, and he was later critical of the way information from these files could be used as leverage.

In response to the statements by former Scientologists read into the parliamentary record of the Australian Senate by Senator Xenophon, the Australian PM Kevin Rudd said he would ponder opening an inquiry into Scientology. The Prime Minister called the concerns raised in the statements by former Scientologists including Saxton "grave", and stated, "Many people in Australia have real concerns about Scientology. I share some of those concerns. But let us proceed carefully, and look carefully at the material which he has provided, before we make a decision on further parliamentary action." Senator Xenophon said that Saxton had been in touch with the office of the Prime Minister, and had offered to provide additional statements and testimony regarding the assertions made in the Australian Senate. In March 2010, Xenophon's call for an inquiry was "overwhelmingly rejected" by the Australian Senate, the senators voting 33 to 6 against, with 37 abstentions.

== Scientology response ==
Scientology in November 2009 said that Saxton's letter to Senator Xenophon was not reliable. The Church of Scientology released a statement in 2009 referring to Saxton as "a mean hateful young man". The head of Scientology in New Zealand, Mike Ferriss, characterised Saxton as a "nutter" and a "consummate liar". In a statement given by Ferriss to Campbell Live, he said, "There are no forced abortions in Scientology and if Aaron Saxton or anyone else coerced someone into having an abortion then they are way outside of the Church's policy and ethical conduct."

In February 2010, Scientologist Sue Hunt tried to get an Apprehended Violence Order (AVO) filed against Saxton. Hunt said Saxton had banged on her car window during a protest against Scientology. Saxton said that he did not know the individual. According to Today Tonight, "Scientologist Sue Hunt completed a course called 'PTS/SP'. This course is designed to teach Scientologists how to attack, intimidate, harass, even lie about anyone or any group that criticises Scientology." Saxton said that the AVO was an attempt to suppress his right to freedom of speech. Magistrate Paul Falzon questioned the legitimacy of Hunt's assertions, and said the court would require demonstration of "reasonable apprehension" of a threatening or violent action. "Have you seen what happens to Nicole Kidman?", queried the Magistrate regarding Hunt's assertions.

Senator Xenophon spoke out critically about Scientology's actions against Saxton, and referenced the practice of fair game. "Since Aaron has spoken out he says he's been harassed at work, his mother's been visited by private investigators, he's been getting a number of unexplained phone calls to his private number and you've got to ask the question has this got anything to do with the Scientology doctrine of Fair Game? Let me just quote you what L Ron Hubbard said about it. He said Scientology critics can be tricked, sued or lied to or destroyed. They are the words of the founder of Scientology," said Senator Xenophon.

== Commentary ==
The Courier-Mail called Saxton a whistleblower against Scientology, and 3 News said that Saxton's "whistleblowing about the Church has made it all the way to the Australian Parliament". The New Zealand Herald described the statements given to Senator Xenophon by Saxton as "at the centre" of the Senator's speech in the Australian Senate criticising Scientology. The New Zealand Herald commented, "Saxton's allegations about behind-the-scenes church activities caused an uproar after they were quoted in the Australian Senate", and reported that Saxton's statements "formed part of a blistering attack in the Australian Senate". The Australian current affairs program, produced by the Seven Network, Today Tonight, described Saxton's revelations as "shocking". Today Tonight commented, "He joined a group of former Scientologists in revealing stunning, shocking claims of abuse, tabled by federal independent Senator Nick Xenophon." The Editor-in-Chief of The Village Voice stated that Saxton's statements comprised "some of the most cited after Xenophon's speech", and commented, "Saxton's profile in Australia blew up overnight after Xenophon's speech, and his story quickly became familiar there".

== See also ==
- Scientology in Australia
- Scientology and abortion
- Scientology controversies
- Sea Org
