= Scientology and gender =

Beliefs and practices about gender

Scientology has a complex relationship with concepts of gender roles and discrimination, as while the core beliefs of Scientology hold humans to consist of genderless Thetans, the Church and other Scientology organizations have frequently been noted as upholding discriminatory policies or views based on the original writings of founder L. Ron Hubbard.

Roy Wallis, in 1976 wrote in The Road to Total Freedom that the Scientologist population was 59% male and 41% female, a number referenced on The Auditor, a publication of the Church of Scientology. In 1988, a participant observer study from the University of Copenhagen showed that the average participant in the Church of Scientology Copenhagen was a 35-year-old man. Though the numbers are not great in disparity, "they provide non-census evidence supporting the contention that more men than women become member of CoS," Tollefson and Lewis write.

== Gender roles ==
In his book Scientology: A New Slant on Life, Scientology founder L. Ron Hubbard wrote the following passages:

A society in which women are taught anything but the management of a family, the care of men, and the creation of the future generation is a society which is on its way out [...] The historians can peg the point where a society begins its sharpest decline at the instant when women begin to take part, on an equal footing with men, in political and business affairs, since this means that the men are decadent and the women are no longer women. This is not a sermon on the role or position of women; it is a statement of bald and basic fact.

Hubbard's Scientology: A History of Man additionally fails to use gender-neutral language.

These passages, along with other ones of a similar nature from Hubbard, have been criticized by Alan Scherstuhl of The Village Voice as expressions of hatred towards women.

The traditional Scientology wedding ceremony includes these remarks on men and women:

Now, (groom's name), girls need clothes and food and tender happiness and frills, a pan, a comb, perhaps a cat. All caprice if you will, but still they need them. Hear well, sweet (bride's name), for promise binds. Young men are free and may forget. Remind him then that you may have necessities and follies, too.

== Pregnancy and abortion ==
L. Ron Hubbard's discussion of abortion in his 1950 book Dianetics: The Modern Science of Mental Health states that abortion and attempts at abortion could cause trauma to the fetus and to the mother in both spiritual and physical ways. Scientologists came to believe that attempted abortions could cause traumatic experiences felt by the fetus, which would later be remembered as memories referred to in Scientology as "engrams". In the Scientology technique called Auditing, Scientologists are frequently queried regarding their sexual feelings and behaviors. These questions about Scientologists' sexual behavior are often posed to members during "security checks", a specific form of auditing sessions where individuals are required to document their divergence from the organization's ethics. One of the questions asked in these security checks is, "Have you ever been involved in an abortion?". In contrast, it has been alleged that if a woman gets pregnant while in the Scientologist organization called Sea Org, she will either be sent to a lower-level organization of Scientology, or be pressured to have an abortion.

Silent birth, sometimes known as quiet birth, is a birthing procedure advised by L. Ron Hubbard and advocated by Scientologists in which "everyone attending the birth should refrain from spoken words as much as possible" and where "chatty doctors and nurses, shouts to 'PUSH, PUSH' and loud or laughing remarks to 'encourage' are avoided". According to Scientology doctrine, this is because "any words spoken are recorded in the reactive mind and can have an aberrative effect on the mother and the child." There have been no attempts to prove this medically or scientifically.

Hubbard warned against sexual activity (including masturbation) during pregnancy, on premise that sexual activity during pregnancy could damage fetal development, as by producing engrams detrimental to future activity. This view is disputed by some doctors, as Paulette Cooper commented in her book The Scandal of Scientology:

Hubbard's theory never makes it really clear, at least in a manner that would be accepted by most medical doctors, exactly how engrams can be planted before a foetus had developed a nervous system or the sense organs with which to register an impression, or even how a person could retain or 'remember' verbal statements before he had command of a language.

These same beliefs form the basis for Hubbard's silent birth doctrine. According to a Scientology manual on raising children, a couple should be silent before and after coition.

== See also ==
- Scientology's second-dynamic topics:
  - Scientology and sexual orientation
  - Scientology and sex
  - Scientology and abortion
  - Scientology and marriage
  - Silent birth
- Kate Bornstein
