= Silent birth =

Scientology and Dianetics practice

Silent birth, sometimes known as quiet birth, is a birthing procedure advised by L. Ron Hubbard and advocated by Scientologists in which "everyone attending the birth should refrain from spoken words as much as possible" and where "... chatty doctors and nurses, shouts to 'PUSH, PUSH' and loud or laughing remarks to 'encourage' are avoided". According to Scientology doctrine, this is because "any words spoken are recorded in the reactive mind and can have an aberrative effect on the mother and the child." Hubbard asserted that not maintaining verbal silence during childbirth could adversely affect the child later in life. Church members believe that noises, sounds and words while a child is being born can possibly cause trauma, which in turn causes the production of engrams, thus necessitating silent birth. Scientologists believe that it is also a way to assist a newborn in their spiritual development.

The concept of silent birth is a mandatory practice in Scientology doctrine. It is based upon the principle that expectant mothers must be provided the utmost care and respect and Hubbard's words: "Everyone must learn to say nothing within the expectant mother's hearing using labor and delivery. Particularly during birth, absolute silence must be maintained and the more gentle the delivery, the better." Silent birth is meant to make the transition to physical separation from the mother less painful for the child. The church does not take a position against using medication during birth or the practice of birth by caesarean section. There have been no attempts to medically or scientifically prove there is a benefit to silent birth, and the church does not claim that silent birth is a medically proven approach; it instead characterizes it as a practice conducted for religious and philosophical reasons.

== Scientific opinion ==
The asserted benefit of silent birth has been questioned by a number of doctors and other health care professionals. Patricia Devine, MD, a maternal–fetal medicine specialist who was the director of the Labor and Delivery Unit at Columbia University Medical Center in 2006, said, "There's absolutely no scientific evidence that taking [noise] away at the time of delivery will have any effect on outcome for the baby or mother."

When asked whether there was any medical evidence that indicated that silent birth was beneficial, Damian Alagia, MD, associate clinical professor in the department of obstetrics and gynecology at George Washington University Medical Center, replied, "It may be in the Scientology literature, but it's not in the scientific literature. In my understanding, L. Ron Hubbard never spent any time in medical school, studying pediatrics or studying neonatal development. To think that a baby born in silence is going to do any better than a baby born, say, listening to Hank Williams is just foolhardy."

== Contesting of blood testing requirement ==
In 2004, Scientologists Ray and Louise Spiering went to federal court to argue that Nebraska's mandatory blood test for infants would violate their right to practice the "Silent Birth Method" of their religion. According to the lawsuit "every effort should be made to avoid subjecting the baby to loud sounds, talking, stress or pain during the first seven days of the baby's life ... Because a baby goes through so much pain during the birth process, Scientologists believe that a newborn baby should not be subjected to any further pain or significant sensory experiences." Although a temporary court order allowed them to delay the test, they ultimately lost the lawsuit in 2006.

== Katie Holmes ==
The "silent birth" became an object of media interest when it was known that outspoken Scientologist actor Tom Cruise, and wife Katie Holmes who converted to Scientology from Roman Catholicism, were expecting a child. Reports that the couple would follow the practice of silent birth were denied, until photos were taken of large placards being delivered to the couple's mansion bearing instructions for the silent birth, such as "Be silent and make all physical movements slow and understandable."

== Week after birth ==
Around the time of the birth of Cruise and Holmes's child, it was reported in the media that speaking to the infant during the first week of its life was barred by Scientology doctrine. A Church spokesperson termed this "a total fabrication". The Church of Scientology International wrote, "L. Ron Hubbard never wrote that parents should not speak to their child for seven days following birth." The same website also said "[t]he idea of silent birth is based on L. Ron Hubbard's research into the mind and spirit. He found that words spoken during moments of pain and unconsciousness can have adverse effects on an individual later in life." The website also said "[m]others naturally want to give their baby the best possible start in life and thus keep the birth as quiet as possible."

== See also ==
- Scientology's second-dynamic topics:
  - Scientology and gender
  - Scientology and sexual orientation
  - Scientology and sex
  - Scientology and abortion
  - Scientology and marriage
