= Scientology and sex =

Sexual views and teachings

The beliefs and practices of Scientology include material related to sex and the rearing of children, which collectively form the second dynamic (urge toward survival) in Scientology. These beliefs and practices are based on the written works of Church of Scientology founder L. Ron Hubbard.

== The second dynamic ==
In Hubbard's eight dynamics, "sex" is the second dynamic, representing both the sexual act and the family unit. According to Reuters: "The second dynamic includes all creative activity, including sex, procreating and the raising of children."

== Pain and sex ==
On August 26, 1982 Hubbard authored a Hubbard Communications Office Bulletin (HCOB) entitled "Pain and Sex", in which he accuses psychiatrists (abbreviated "psychs"), of orchestrating a global conspiracy to undermine society and spread chaos:

Combined, pain and sex make up the insane Jack-the-Rippers (who killed only prostitutes) and the whole strange body of sex-murder freaks, including Hinckley, and the devotees of late-night horror movies. Under the false data of the psychs (who have been on the track a long time and are the sole cause of decline in this universe) both pain and sex are gaining ground in this society and, coupled with robbery which is a hooded companion of both, may very soon make the land a true jungle of crime.

In the same bulletin, Hubbard states that pain and sex are both "invented tools of degradation" by "destructive creatures" (referring to psychiatrists) with the intention "to shrink people and cut their alertness, knowingness, power and reach".

== Homosexuality ==
Scientology opposes same-sex marriage, and its founder called homosexuality a dangerous perversion. Critics state that Scientology promotes homophobia, and that being gay or accused of being gay is viewed as negative in the Scientology community. According to a 2018 source, currently used, updated editions of Hubbard's canonical book, Dianetics, continue to use heteronormative and anti-gay language and list gay people as perverts who are physically ill and extremely dangerous to society. Some critics have stated that the church tried to change their sexual orientation through forms of conversion therapy.

== Sex during pregnancy ==
Hubbard warned against sexual activity (including masturbation) during pregnancy, on the premise that sexual activity during pregnancy could damage fetal development, by producing engrams detrimental to future activity. This view is disputed by doctors, as Paulette Cooper commented in her book The Scandal of Scientology:

Hubbard's theory never makes it really clear, at least in a manner that would be accepted by most medical doctors, exactly how engrams can be planted before a foetus had developed a nervous system or the sense organs with which to register an impression, or even how a person could retain or "remember" verbal statements before he had command of a language.

These same beliefs form the basis for Hubbard's "Silent birth" doctrine, which dictates that no words are spoken during the childbirth process. According to a Scientology manual on raising children, a couple should be silent before and after coition.

== Promiscuity ==
In the 1967 book The Dynamics of Life (originally written circa 1948), Hubbard states that "promiscuity inevitably and invariably indicates a sexual engram of great magnitude. Once that engram is removed, promiscuity can be expected to cease". A footnote then defines promiscuity as "having sexual relations with many people". Hubbard writes in his book The Way to Happiness that sex, if "misused or abused, carries with it heavy penalties and punishments: nature seems to have intended it that way also".

In later years, Hubbard sought to distance himself from efforts to regulate the sexual affairs of Scientologists. In a 1967 policy letter, he declared: "It has never been any part of my plans to regulate or to attempt to regulate the private lives of individuals. Whenever this has occurred, it has not resulted in any improved condition... Therefore all former rules, regulations and policies relating to the sexual activities of Scientologists are cancelled."

== Scientology auditing ==
In an interview with Playboy magazine, Hubbard's estranged son Ronald DeWolf asserted that auditing focused on sex and the individual's sex life, and could later be used as a form of control: "Auditing would address a guy's entire sex life. It was an incredible preoccupation. [...] You have complete control over someone if you have every detail of his sex life and fantasy life on record. In Scientology the focus is on sex. Sex, sex, sex. The first thing we wanted to know about someone we were auditing was his sexual deviations. All you've got to do is find a person's kinks, whatever they might be. Their dreams and fantasies. Then you can fit a ring through their noses and take them anywhere. You promise to fulfill their fantasies or you threaten to expose them [...] very simple."

== Scientology's views on the body ==
Hubbard called the physical world MEST (an acronym of "Matter, Energy, Space and Time"), which thetans (souls) temporarily operating "meat bodies" are meant to transcend and conquer. New recruits to the church are often classified as "raw meat" or "raw public". Scientologists refer to their bodies as "meat bodies".

Scientology emphasizes attaining "cause over MEST", and attaining the ability to abandon one's body via "exteriorization" and ultimately by becoming an Operating Thetan Clear and a Cleared Theta Clear.

== See also ==
- Scientology's second-dynamic topics:
  - Scientology and gender
  - Scientology and homosexuality
  - Scientology and abortion
  - Scientology and marriage
  - Silent birth
- Religion and sexuality
