= Scientology and marriage =

Beliefs and policies

Scientology and marriage, within the Church of Scientology, are discussed in the Scientology books The Second Dynamic and The Background, Ministry, Ceremonies & Sermons of the Scientology Religion. Scientology weddings do not require that both parties of the wedding be adherents of Scientology, nor does the Church exclude material from weddings of other faiths in its own ceremonies. J. Gordon Melton ascribed this to Scientology trying to mollify members of the wedding partners' families.

== Wedding ceremony ==
Scientology wedding ceremonies typically include a bridal procession, best man, maid of honor, and the seating of friends and family. Scientology doesn't prohibit customs from other faiths. There are five versions of the ceremony: traditional, informal, single ring, double ring, and concise double ring. The Traditional ceremony includes:

Now, (groom's name), girls need clothes and food and tender happiness and frills, a pan, a comb, perhaps a cat. All caprice if you will, but still they need them. Hear well, sweet (bride's name), for promise binds. Young men are free and may forget. Remind him then that you may have necessities and follies, too. —L. Ron Hubbard

In the Double Ring ceremony, the ring symbolizes permanency.

== Same-sex marriage ==
The Church of Scientology has had a controversial history regarding LGBT issues and same-sex marriage. In recent years, the Church has publicly embraced the subject more so than in the past. In 2005, a spokesperson for the Church told the New York Daily News that the Church had "not taken an official position on gay marriage, and that members prefer not to talk about it." In 2008 the Church supported Prop 8 in California which banned same-sex marriages, even in counties where they had been performed before. In 2009, award-winning writer Paul Haggis quit the church due to its apparent stance on homosexuality.

== Tom Cruise and Katie Holmes ==
Probably the most famous Scientology wedding was the one between Tom Cruise and Katie Holmes on November 18, 2006. Cruise and Holmes announced their engagement in June 2005. Scientologist spokesperson Karin Pouw stated that as part of their nuptial vows, "they won't go to sleep at night without having repaired any upset they may have had during the day".

== United Kingdom decision ==
In 2008, Louisa Hodkin and then fiancé Alessandro Calcioli were denied the right to marry in a Church of Scientology chapel in London due to a 1970 High Court ruling that said that "Scientology services were not 'acts of worship'." Hodkin initiated legal action, and after a five-year battle, in December 2013, five Supreme Court judges ruled that the Church was "a place of meeting for religious worship". In early 2014, Hodkin and Calcioli wed in the Scientology chapel in Blackfriars, London, and Hodkin expressed pride in the victory, which she felt put an end to inequality for people of all faiths.

== See also ==
- Scientology's second-dynamic topics:
  - Scientology and gender
  - Scientology and sexual orientation
  - Scientology and sex
  - Scientology and abortion
  - Silent birth
