= Ian Tampion =

Personal information
- Full name: Ian Kenneth Tampion
- Born: 15 February 1938
- Died: 14 October 1997 (aged 59)
- Original team: University Blues
- Height: 185 cm (6 ft 1 in)
- Weight: 80 kg (176 lb)

Playing career^{1}
Years	Club	Games (Goals)
1958–1960	South Melbourne	16 (1)
- ^{1} Playing statistics correct to the end of 1960.

Ian Kenneth Tampion (15 February 1938 – 14 October 1997) was an Australian scientologist and sportsman. He played Australian rules football with South Melbourne in the Victorian Football League (VFL).

== Football career ==
Tampion, a wingman recruited from the University Blues in the Victorian Amateur Football Association, played 16 VFL games for South Melbourne over three seasons, from 1958 to 1960.

His most noted moment as a footballer was a goal he kicked during the 1958 VFL season, in which he made a career high nine appearances. In South Melbourne's round 16 win over St Kilda at Junction Oval, Tampion received a free kick as the three-quarter time siren sounded. As he was the centre wing around 80-yards from goal, he decided he was too far out and handed the ball to the umpire, only to be told by South Melbourne's coach Ron Clegg that he should take the kick. Tampion, who had the wind behind him, kicked a drop punt which cleared the surprised St Kilda defenders who had not pushed back. St Kilda's Bob Kupsch raced back towards the goals but the ball beat him to register what was described in The Age as the goal of the season.

He made two appearances for South Melbourne in the 1959 season, then a further five in the 1960 season.

In 1961 he played reserves football for the Carlton Football Club.

== Scientology ==
Tampion was also a high-profile Scientologist who fought legal proceedings to have Scientology recognised in Australia as a church.

He had his first contact with Scientology in 1958 and said that it helped him in his football career. Previously a school teacher, Tampion became a professional scientologist in 1961. He was the technical director of Scientology in Victoria.

In 1965 a Victorian Board of Inquiry banned the practise of Scientology. With his partner Judy, Tampion set up the Church of the New Faith in Melbourne in 1968, which was able to circumvent these laws. He later sued Justice Kevin Anderson for loss and damages, a result of the Board of Inquiry which he headed. Tampion believed both Anderson and the counsel assisting were biased and went beyond their proper terms of reference. In the writ, Tampion claimed the judges had shown misfeasance, breach of duty and recklessness. The lawsuit was dismissed in the Supreme Court as "frivolous and vexatious" and an "abuse of the process of the court".

== Death ==
Tampion died of cancer at the age of 59.
