= Kevin Victor Anderson =

Australian judge (1912-1999)

The Honourable Sir Kevin Anderson QC

Judge of the Supreme Court of Victoria
- In office 29 April 1969 – 4 September 1984
- Preceded by: New seat
- Succeeded by: John Phillips

Personal details
- Born: 1912
- Died: 14 October 1999 (aged 86–87)
- Education: Xavier College
- Alma mater: University of Melbourne

Sir Kevin Victor Anderson QC (1912 – 14 October 1999) was an Australian lawyer and judge who served on the Supreme Court of Victoria from 1969 to 1984.

== Education and early career ==
Anderson was educated at Xavier College, Melbourne, and became a clerk of courts in what is now the Magistrates Court of Victoria on leaving school in 1929. He completed a part-time Bachelor of Laws at the University of Melbourne in 1937. During the Second World War he was commissioned in the Royal Australian Navy, and served in Operations and Naval Intelligence. Towards the end of the War, he was a liaison officer in the Manila headquarters of General Douglas MacArthur, and was present at the Japanese surrender in Tokyo Bay in September 1945. He was admitted to the Victorian Bar on 24 November 1945 and became a Queen's Counsel (QC) on 14 August 1962.

== Scientology inquiry ==
As a QC, Anderson was appointed in late 1963 as a one-man Board of Inquiry into Scientology that sat until April 1965. He concluded that it was "a delusional belief system, based on fiction and fallacies and propagated by falsehood and deception" that was "a serious threat to the community, medically, morally and socially". His report influenced Victoria and other states to enact (or attempt to enact) banning Scientology. It is regarded as controversial by the Human Rights and Equal Opportunity Commission, in the context of the recognition of new religious movements in Australia's increasingly multicultural society.

== Judicial career ==
Anderson served as Chairman of the Victorian Bar Council in 1966–1967, and on 29 April 1969 he was appointed to the Supreme Court of Victoria. He became a figure of controversy in 1971 when the Victorian Parliament passed the second Evidence (Boards and Commissions) Act. This Act amended the Evidence Act, 1958 to grant retrospective immunity from suit to persons who had been associated with a Royal Commission or a Board of Inquiry, equivalent to the immunity of those associated with an action in the Supreme Court. In his autobiography Fossil in the Sandstone, Anderson quipped that this legislation was known informally as the 'Anderson Protection Act' because its immediate effect was to protect him and his assisting counsel Gordon Just from writs issued in the Supreme Court on 28 April 1970 that charged them with misfeasance, breach of duty and recklessness during their conduct of the Inquiry into Scientology.

== Retirement and later life ==
Anderson was knighted in the 1980 Birthday Honours and retired from the bench on 31 August 1984. He was a devout Catholic, and after his retirement argued for the retention of the traditional swearing-in of witnesses in court. He died on 14 October 1999 aged 87. He and his wife Claire (who predeceased him) had six daughters and 20 grandchildren.
