= Science of Survival =

1951 book by L. Ron Hubbard

- Cover of the first edition
- Author: Lafayette Ronald Hubbard
- Language: English
- Subject: Dianetics
- Publisher: Hubbard Dianetic Foundation
- Publication date: 1951
- Publication place: United States
- Media type: Print
- Pages: 548
- OCLC: 14666884

Science of Survival is a 1951 pseudoscientific book by L. Ron Hubbard which continues to be published by the Church of Scientology as part of Scientology's canon. According to Jon Atack, the title Science of Survival was chosen "to appeal to readers of Korzybski's highly popular Science and Sanity", and Hubbard even acknowledged Korzybski in the book. Its original subtitle was "simplified, faster dianetic techniques", although later editions were subtitled "Prediction of human behavior".

The book set out what Hubbard called the "dynamics of behavior" and provided descriptions of new techniques of Dianetics processing that Hubbard described as being faster and simpler than those that he had advanced previously. In the book, Hubbard introduced two concepts that were later to become key elements of Scientology—theta and the tone scale—and also endorsed the concept of past lives. The book has been criticized for its inhumane suggestions that target some classes of the population.

== Publication history ==
The book was published in August 1951 and dedicated to his daughter Alexis Valerie Hubbard (whom he later disowned). It was dictated on SoundScriber discs in Havana, Cuba, where Hubbard took refuge when his marriage to his second wife Sara Northrup Hubbard broke down. The book Bare-faced Messiah recounts how Hubbard was unable to write and depressed over a custody dispute over Alexis, accusing his wife of "hypnotising him in his sleep and commanding him not to write".

By the time Science of Survival was published, the public popularity of Dianetics had faded and only one Dianetics Foundation was still in existence—the Wichita foundation funded by millionaire Dianeticist Don Purcell. The foundation published the book with the first edition of only 1,250 copies, after which Hubbard blamed Purcell for poor sales of the book. The Church of Scientology has continued to publish the book as a standard reference work of Scientology.

== Contents ==
=== Theta ===
Although Hubbard had not yet established Scientology, which was overtly presented as a religious practice, and continued to maintain that Dianetics was a scientific subject with techniques aimed towards therapeutic results, the information on "theta" in the book clearly begins to move the subject into a religious direction. Hubbard describes theta as a sort of "life energy", and contrasts it with "MEST" – "matter, energy, space and time", the components of the physical universe. He discusses the concept of "entheta", or enturbulated theta, and "enMEST", or enturbulated MEST, as being confused or dysfunctional states of being, and describes how at low levels of the tone scale theta and MEST become overwhelmed by entheta and enMEST before ultimately death occurs and only enMEST remains, whilst as the tone scale is ascended theta and MEST act more and more in accord with each other until MEST is entirely overcome and pure theta is attained. This concept of a spiritual life energy entering and purifying the physical universe recalls the ideas of Gnostic religions.

=== Tests and results ===
As Hubbard tells the story in Science of Survival, in 1950 the Hubbard Dianetic Research Foundation agreed to a definitive test of claims demanded by the psychological community who wanted Dianetics to validate its claims. The claims to be tested were increased IQ, the relief of psychoses, and the relief of psychosomatic illnesses.

Hubbard said that the tests had been done using psychology's strictest psychometric protocols (Minnesota Multiphasic Test and the Wechsler-Bellevue, "Form B") with examiners Gordon Southon, Peggy Southon and Dalmyra Ibanez, Ph.D., Ed.D. Hubbard also said that their witnessed signatures were affixed to each bank of tests and that all three claims were validated by these tests and these psychometrists.

In January 1951 Hubbard published a booklet by these same alleged doctors: Dianetic Processing – A Brief Survey of Research Projects and Preliminary Results by Dalmyra Ibanez, Ph.D., Ed.D., Gordon Southon, Peggy Southon and Peggy Benton In it, the authors state:

If dianetic research is to be defined as "the study of human behaviour for the purpose of discovering and removing the sources of aberration", or, in other words, as the study of mental health, a need arises for tools with which to pursue that study. Actually, such tools as do exist may or may not apply to the dynamics of Dianetics, since its methodology has no exact parallel in the history of psychology... For our present studies, therefore, use has been made of those testing instruments judged by a group of psychologists as most appropriate for dianetic purposes.

The names of the persons in this "group of psychologists" are not mentioned. The booklet presents case histories and X-rays and says that it proves that Dianetics can cure "aberrations" including manic depression, asthma, arthritis, colitis and "overt homosexuality." The booklet further says that it used twelve different tests and presents results from five, four of which came from the California Test Bureau and had according to a 1946 investigation of V. E. Ordahl of the University of California no evidence of reliability or validity.

Modern reprintings of Science of Survival (post twentieth printing) no longer contain information about this study or mention the alleged IQ gains of about ten points and other similar alleged gains. The modern version (ISBN 0-88404-418-1) bear a new subtitle: "Prediction of Human Behavior". Earlier editions were subtitled "Simplified, Faster Dianetic Techniques".

=== Body odor and the tone scale ===
In Science of Survival, Hubbard discusses the correlation between body odor, bodily substances, and one's position on the emotional tone scale:

The body is normally sweet-smelling down to 2.0 but begins to exude chronically certain unpleasant effluvia from 2.0 down. Individuals from 2.0 down commonly have bad breath. Their feet may have a considerable odour. The musk glands are very active. The sweat has a peculiar smell. Sexual organs emit a repelling odour. And various body exhaust functions are not under very good control. The person may have to urinate or defecate under slight stresses or may weep easily for no apparent cause. This column has not been added to this chart because it has not been thoroughly explored but is only known in a general way. Any slightly or greatly repulsive physical odour from an individual does, however, indicate a tone scale position below 2.0. It is amusing to note that in the Orient wives are commonly selected by the sweetness of their perspiration. This is a very reliable test for position on the tone scale. People who have bad breath as they are processed lose it when they are above 2.0 on the tone scale. People who are temporarily suppressed below 2.0 commonly have bad breath.

— Page 380

== Controversy ==
One passage in particular in Chapter 27 of Science of Survival has been singled out for criticism by opponents of Scientology. In it, Hubbard states that

The sudden and abrupt deletion of all individuals occupying the lower bands of the tone scale from the social order would result in an almost instant rise in the cultural tone and would interrupt the dwindling spiral into which any society may have entered. It is not necessary to produce a world of clears in order to have a reasonable and worthwhile social order; it is only necessary to delete those individuals who range from 2.0 down, either by processing them enough to get their tone level above the 2.0 line — a task which, indeed, is not very great, since the amount of processing in many cases might be under fifty hours, although it might also in others be in excess of two hundred — or simply quarantining them from the society. A Venezuelan dictator [Juan Vicente Gómez] once decided to stop leprosy. He saw that most lepers in his country were also beggars. By the simple expedient of collecting and destroying all the beggars in Venezuela an end was put to leprosy in that country.

— L. Ron Hubbard in Science of Survival

Critics, such as the French Government's Anti-cult interministerial mission, believe that forcibly quarantining all human beings that are classified low on Scientology's tone scale would be a violation of human rights.

Furthermore, the book's claims that "adders are safe bedmates compared to people on the lower bands of the tone scale" and that it is one's "level on the tone scale which gives [him or her] value" have also come under fire.

Hubbard has also been criticized for the strong opposition to abortion, which he displays in the book, in which he says that "America spends [billions] yearly on institutions for the insane and jails for criminals ... primarily because of attempted abortions done by some sex-blocked mother to whom children are a curse, not a blessing of God."

== See also ==
- Bibliography of Scientology
- Scientology beliefs and practices

== Bibliography ==
- Fischer, Harvey Jay: "Dianetic therapy: an experimental evaluation. A statistical analysis of the effect of dianetic therapy as measured by group tests of intelligence, mathematics and personality." Abstract of Ph.D. thesis, 1953, New York University
- Fox, Jack et al.: An Experimental Investigation of Hubbard's Engram Hypothesis (Dianetics) in Psychological Newsletter, 1959, 10 131-134
- Minnesota Multiphasic Personality Inventory
- Wechsler-Bellevue Intelligence Scale
- Chris Owen, History of the Personality Test
