= Church of the New Faith =

Name used by the Church of Scientology in Australia

Church of the New Faith was a name used by the Church of Scientology in Australia from 1969 until 1983 to avoid laws that restricted or banned the practice of Scientology.

== History ==
In 1965 the State of Victoria passed a law, the Psychological Practices Act, 1965, banning the use of the E-meter and teaching Scientology for money. Considering Scientology to be a form of psychology, it required anyone practising psychology to be registered with a newly established Victorian Psychological Council. However, since the Act's definition of psychology was broad enough to include the pastoral counselling traditionally done by priests and ministers of religion, any religious denomination recognised by the Australian government under the federal Marriage Act was exempted from its provisions. The Scientology organisation in Spring Street, Melbourne, closed in response to this law.

Similar laws were later passed in Western Australia in 1968 (the Scientology Act) and South Australia (the Psychological Practices Act) in 1973. The Church changed its name to "Church of the New Faith" and remained active in these two States.

In November 1968, two Australian Scientologists who had been working at Saint Hill, Ian and Judith Tampion, set up a mission of the Church of the New Faith in an inner suburb of Melbourne. They held meetings and sold books, but Scientologists in Melbourne would travel to Adelaide, South Australia for training.

The Church of the New Faith was incorporated in Adelaide on 18 June 1969.

In 1972, Western Australia repealed its Scientology Act. In January 1973, the newly elected federal Labor government recognised Scientology as a religious denomination under the Marriage Act, allowing Scientology ministers to conduct marriages and making them effectively exempt from the provisions of Victoria's Psychological Practices Act. The mission in Melbourne now became a fully functional Church offering training and counselling to the public. However, Victoria's law remained active, though the Victorian Scientology organisation was incorporated in South Australia.

In 1980, the Victorian branch of the Church of the New Faith applied for exemption from payroll tax. (The Church had exemption already in all other states where it operated). The Commissioner of Pay-Roll Tax rejected the application. The Church appealed against the decision, and lost on 18 December 1980. The Church lodged a Victorian Supreme Court appeal against this on 24 February 1981, which the full Supreme Court rejected on 5 May 1982.

Around this time, the Victorian Psychological Practices Act was becoming controversial, and was seen by many to be counter-productive. On 25 February 1981, officials of major religions urged repeal of the Act. Later, leading Churchmen including heads of Theological Colleges had signed a petition: "to remove all prohibitive sections aimed at members of the Church of Scientology purely on religious grounds. It further asks 'that in future no legislation be passed which discriminates against any minority because of its beliefs'".

The Victorian Minister for Health, Tom Roper, explained to the Legislative Assembly that the Act was not being enforced in much of Australia. The Church of Scientology was flourishing in spite of the legislation banning its practice. Roper urged the lawmakers that in the future they shouldn't single out a minority group for legislation "in the way the Psychological Practices Act discriminates against Scientology."

The Liberal and National Parties did not oppose the Labor Government's action to repeal the Psychological Practices Act. The Act was amended by the Psychologists Registration (Scientology) Act, 1982 to remove all references to Scientology on 24 June 1982 and was repealed in 1987.

This did not, however, give the Church tax exempt status in Victoria. The Church appealed against the payroll decision to the High Court on 9 November 1982 and the case was accepted. They won the case (Church of the New Faith v. Commissioner of Pay-Roll Tax (Victoria)) in late 1983 and immediately started operating as the Church of Scientology once more, with confirmed status as a tax-exempt religion. Subsequently in 2013, the UK Supreme Court affirmed the religious status of Scientology in that country, and credited the Australian High Court case judgment of Wilson and Deane as the "most helpful" of various international cases in defining the characteristics of religion.

Victoria's Psychological Practices Act was finally repealed by the Psychologists Registration Act, 1987. The South Australian Psychological Practices Act has remained in force and regulates the activities of hypnotists and psychologists in that State. However, neither this Act itself nor the current regulations now contain any reference to Scientology. The Western Australian Scientology Act, 1968 has been replaced by a Psychologists Registration Act, 1976 with similar provisions.
