= Bibliography of books critical of Scientology =

This is a bibliography of works critical of Scientology and the Church of Scientology.

Between 1954 and 2020, only four English-language scholarly monographs have been published about Scientology (Wallis 1977 [1976]; Whitehead 1987; Urban 2011; Westbrook 2019). Most other critical works have come in the form of apostate memoirs: books written by ex-members about their experiences within the Church of Scientology (CoS). On several occasions, the Church of Scientology has initiated copyright infringement lawsuits to restrain the publication of books critical of Scientology or its founder L. Ron Hubbard. Since 2008, the Internet has been able to provide a much safer ground for publishing material critical of the CoS, because traditional copyright law had little application there.

== Books by title ==
This section lists books alphabetically by title. It includes memoirs by former members, investigative histories and exposés, biographies of L. Ron Hubbard, and scholarly studies.

- Ali's Smile: Naked Scientology (1971) by William S. Burroughs
- Arrows in the Dark: A True Story of Intrigue and Espionage from the Church of Scientology's #1 Spy (2015) by Merrell Vannier ISBN 9781508534075
- Bare-faced Messiah: The True Story of L. Ron Hubbard (1987) by Russell Miller
- Battlefield Scientology: Exposing L Ron Hubbard's Dangerous "Religion" (2018) by Paulette Cooper and Tony Ortega ISBN 1727131568
- Believe What You Like: What happened between the Scientologists and the National Association for Mental Health (1973) by C. H. Rolph
- Beyond Belief: My Secret Life Inside Scientology and My Harrowing Escape (2013) by Jenna Miscavige Hill ISBN 9780062248473
- A Billion Years: My Escape From a Life in the Highest Ranks of Scientology (2022) by Mike Rinder ISBN 9781982185763
- Blown for Good: Behind the Iron Curtain of Scientology (2009) by Marc Headley
- The Church of Scientology: A History of a New Religion (2011) by Hugh Urban
- The Complex: An Insider Exposes the Covert World of the Church of Scientology (2008) by John Duignan (with Nicola Tallant)
- Counterfeit Dreams: One Man's Journey into and Out of the World of Scientology (2010) by Jefferson Hawkins ISBN 9780615375649
- Cults of Unreason (1973) by Christopher Evans OL 5438675M
- Damaged Lives: the Legacy of Scientology (2012) by Margery Wakefield
- David Miscavige: The Scientology Leader in the Shadow by Renata and Claudio Lugli
- The Defector: After 20 Years in Scientology, originally in Danish, Afhopperen: Mine 20 år i Scientology (2011), memoir by Robert Dam
- A Doctor's Report on Dianetics (1951, 1987) by Joseph A. Winter
- Escaping Scientology: An Insider's True Story (2017) memoir by Karen Schless Pressley
- The Expert Witness: My Life at the Top of Scientology (2018), memoir by Jesse Prince
- Fads and Fallacies in the Name of Science (1952, 1957) by Martin Gardner
- Fair Game: The Incredible Untold Story of Scientology in Australia (2016) by Steve Cannane. ISBN 9780733331329
- Going Clear: Scientology, Hollywood, and the Prison of Belief (2013) by Lawrence Wright
- Have You Told All? Inside my Time with Narconon and Scientology (2013) by Lucas Catton ISBN 0615768725
- Hollywood Undercover: Revealing the Sordid Secrets of Tinseltown (2007) by Ian Halperin
- Hollywood, Interrupted: Insanity Chic in Babylon - The Case Against Celebrity (2004) by Andrew Breitbart & Mark Ebner
- Inside Scientology: How I Joined Scientology and Became Superhuman (1972) by Robert Kaufman
- Inside Scientology: The Story of America's Most Secretive Religion (2011) by Janet Reitman
- I Survived! Overcoming Abuse, Scientology and Life in General (2019) by Margery Wakefield ISBN 9780578492995
- L. Ron Hubbard, Messiah or Madman? (1987, 1995) by Bent Corydon and Ronald DeWolf
- Lång väg hem: mina 25 år i sekten (2024, in Swedish), memoir by Mariette Lindstein
- The Mind Benders (1971) by Cyril Vosper
- My Billion Year Contract: Memoir of a Former Scientologist (2009) by Nancy Many ISBN 0578039222,OL 25424752M
- The New Believers (2001) by David V. Barrett
- Nineteen Eighty-Four, My Journey Into Scientology's Innermost Secrets - And Out Again (Norwegian: Nittenåttifire, Min vei inn i Scientologiens innerste hemmeligheter - og ut igjen) (2013) by Geir Isene ISBN 9788282820592
- A Piece of Blue Sky: Scientology, Dianetics, and L. Ron Hubbard Exposed (1990) by Jon Atack
- A Queer and Pleasant Danger: A Memoir (2012) by Kate Bornstein ISBN 9780807001653,OL 25139468M
- Religion Inc. The Church of Scientology (1986) by Stewart Lamont ISBN 0245543341,OL 2080316M
- Renunciation and Reformulation: A Study of Conversion in an American Sect (1987) by Harriet Whitehead ISBN 0801418496,OL 2722663M
- The Road to Total Freedom: A Sociological Analysis of Scientology (1976, 1977) by Roy Wallis
- The Road to Xenu: Life Inside Scientology (1991) by Margery Wakefield
- Ruthless: Scientology, My Son David Miscavige, and Me (2016) by Ron Miscavige (with Dan Koon)
- The Scandal of Scientology (1971) Tower Publications, by Paulette Cooper
- Scientology: Abuse At the Top (2010) by Amy Scobee ISBN 9780692008010
- Scientology: The Now Religion (1970) by George Malko. OL 5444962M
- Tom Cruise: An Unauthorized Biography (2008) by Andrew Morton
- Testimony: The Autobiography of Margery Wakefield (1996) by Margery Wakefield
- Troublemaker: Surviving Hollywood and Scientology (2015) by Leah Remini
- The Unbreakable Miss Lovely: How the Church of Scientology tried to destroy Paulette Cooper (2015) by Tony Ortega ISBN 9781511639378
- Understanding Scientology: The Demon Cult (1991) by Margery Wakefield ISBN 9780557109265

== Government reports ==
Official inquiries into Scientology have been conducted. These reports examined the organization's practices and their effects on members and the public.

Year	Title	Notes
1965	Anderson Report	Australia, Board of Inquiry into Scientology
1969	Dumbleton–Powles Report	New Zealand, Commission of Inquiry into the Hubbard Scientology organisation
1970	Lee Report	Canada, Sectarian Healers and Hypnotherapy
1971	Foster Report	United Kingdom, Enquiry into the Practice and Effects of Scientology
1972	The Kotzé Report	South Africa, Report of the Commission of Enquiry into Scientology
1997	Brainwashing in Scientology's Rehabilitation Project Force (RPF)	Hamburg, Germany report by Stephen A. Kent, published for the Scientology Task Force of the Hamburg Interior Authority

== Investigative reporting ==
This section lists major newspaper and magazine investigations of the Church of Scientology, including multi-part series.

Year	Title	Notes
1979	Scientology: An in-depth profile of a new force in Clearwater	Investigative report by St. Petersburg Times and winner of 1980 Pulitzer Prize in national reporting
1990	The Scientology Story	A sixteen-part series by the Los Angeles Times
1991	The Thriving Cult of Greed and Power	Investigative report by Richard Behar in Time magazine
2009	The Truth Rundown	A 3-part series of investigative reporting in the St Petersburg Times
2009	Inside Scientology	215-page report by the St. Petersburg Times

== Documentaries ==
This section lists nonfictional film and television documentaries and series about Scientology, including investigative programs.

Year	Title	Notes
2007	Scientology and Me	TV documentary on BBC's Panorama hosted by John Sweeney
2010	The Secrets of Scientology	TV documentary on BBC's Panorama hosted by John Sweeney
2015	Going Clear	Documentary film by Alex Gibney, HBO Documentary Films
2015	My Scientology Movie	Documentary film by Louis Theroux, Altitude Film Distribution
2016–2019	Leah Remini: Scientology and the Aftermath	Three-season documentary series on A&E hosted by Leah Remini and Mike Rinder

== Academic journals ==
This section lists peer-reviewed articles that examine Scientology's practices, legal disputes, and human-rights controversies.

- Kent, Stephen A. (April 1999). "The Globalization of Scientology: Influence, Control and Opposition in Transnational Markets". Religion. 29 (2): 147–169. doi:10.1006/reli.1998.0154 – via ResearchGate.

== See also ==
- Scientology in popular culture — includes fiction and satire works critical of Scientology
- Scientology controversies
- List of apologetic works
