= Scientology in popular culture =

Scientology has been a prominent and controversial subject in popular culture, inspiring depictions across literature, film, television, music, theatre, video games, and digital media. Since the 1960s, artists and creators have drawn on Scientology's beliefs and practices and its public profile, frequently using them as material for satire, criticism, or fictionalized analogues. These portrayals range from documentaries and dramatic films to comedic treatments and symbolic stand‑ins for the movement. Many works emphasize themes such as secrecy, organizational behavior, celebrity involvement, and the public controversies surrounding Scientology.

== Overview ==
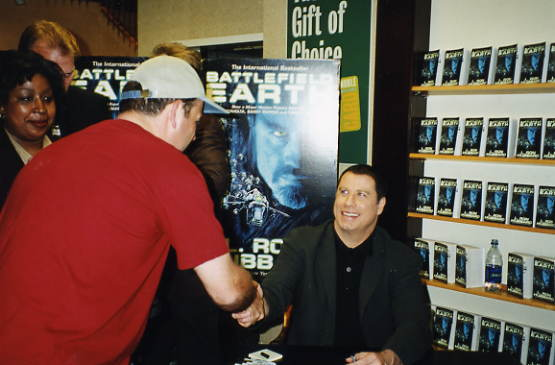
John Travolta at a 2000 book signing for Hubbard's Battlefield Earth novel. Copies were reissued with a cover showing Travolta in character from the film adaptation.

In the 1960s, author William S. Burroughs wrote about Scientology in both fictional short stories and non-fictional essays. The topic was dealt with more directly in his book, Ali's Smile/Naked Scientology. The 2000 film Battlefield Earth was an adaptation of a novel by L. Ron Hubbard.

Musicians and playwrights have made reference to Scientology on some of their work, with some pieces treating the topic in a negative light by their references, and at least one in a positive manner. Frank Zappa's 1979 concept album/rock opera Joe's Garage lampoons Scientology in the song "A Token of My Extreme". Scientologist Chick Corea has made reference to Scientology in his work, and two of his albums were influenced by L. Ron Hubbard novels. Maynard James Keenan of the metal band Tool, has been critical of Scientology, and the 1996 song "Ænema" contains a negative reference to L. Ron Hubbard. Both Scientology and the life of its founder L. Ron Hubbard were addressed in the 2003 Off-Broadway musical, A Very Merry Unauthorized Children's Scientology Pageant. The play took a tongue-in-cheek look at both Hubbard's life and the history of the Church of Scientology, and received an Obie Award in 2004.

Scientology has also been dealt with in fictional television shows, including sitcoms, cartoons, and dramas. The 2005 South Park episode "Trapped in the Closet" dealt with Scientology, and related the Xenu story. This episode resulted in a deal of controversy, including the departure of Isaac Hayes, and questions over why the episode was not initially rebroadcast. In season four of the television program Nip/Tuck, characters Kimber and Matt join the Church. (Note: Use of "Church" or "the Church" is a common shortened form of "Church of Scientology"; see The Church (Scientology).) Issues addressed within Nip/Tuck have included both the Xenu story and a look at deprogramming.

In Boston Legal's third season, character Alan Shore helps defend an employer sued for discrimination after firing a Scientologist. The episode delves into some of the employee's more eccentric beliefs as well as a debate on religious bigotry, but Shore ends up winning the case for his client.

== Literature ==
William S. Burroughs, who briefly dabbled with Scientology, wrote extensively about it during the late 1960s, weaving some of its jargon into his fictional works, as well as authoring non-fiction essays about it. In the end, however, he abandoned Scientology and publicly eschewed it in an editorial for the Los Angeles Free Press in 1970. Burroughs' work Ali's Smile/Naked Scientology contains many writings related to both Dianetics and L. Ron Hubbard.

"Operation Freakout", also known as "Operation PC Freakout", was the name given by the Church of Scientology to a covert plan intended to have the author Paulette Cooper imprisoned or committed to a mental institution. The plan, undertaken in 1976 following years of Church-initiated lawsuits and covert harassment, was meant to eliminate the perceived threat that Cooper posed to the Church and obtain revenge for her publication in 1971 of a highly critical book, The Scandal of Scientology. The events of Operation Freakout are featured, in a thinly fictionalized form, in Giuseppe Genna's 2004 novel In the Name of Ishmael. Scientology is referred to as "Science Religion", Cooper is called "Paulette Rowling" and Mary Sue Hubbard is "Johanna Lewis". The book includes an almost word-for-word transcription of the Operation Freakout planning document of April 1, 1976, with the names of the principal figures substituted as described above.

In the science-fiction setting of Count Zero, a cyberpunk novel by author William Gibson, one of the character's relatives is mentioned to be a Scientologist. L. Ron Hubbard (referred to simply as "Hubbard") is also mentioned as an option of a possible hologram that could appear over someone's bed, another choice included the Virgin Mary.

== Music ==
Frank Zappa's 1979 concept album/rock opera Joe's Garage lampoons Scientology in the song "A Token of My Extreme". Zappa uses terminology such as "L. Ron Hoover" and "Appliantology", telling the main character "Joe" that he "must go into the closet" to pursue his latent appliance fetishism. Gary Numan had popular songs laced with Scientology references in the 1980s such as "Me! I Disconnect from You", "Praying to the Aliens", and "Only a Downstat", influenced directly by William S. Burroughs' Scientology-based writings.

The progressive metal band Tool has voiced criticism of Scientology. After releasing their first full-length album Undertow in 1993, the band began touring to promote their new work. In May 1993, Tool was scheduled to play the Garden Pavilion in Hollywood but learned at the last minute that the Garden Pavilion belonged to the Church of Scientology, which the band felt clashed with "the band's ethics about how a person should not follow a belief system that constricts their development as a human being". The band's vocalist Maynard James Keenan recalled that he "spent most of the show baa-ing like a sheep at the audience". Scott Schalin reported in Bay Area Music: "Between songs, Keenan, staring first at the lush grounds paid for by devoted L. Ron followers and then into the eyes of his own audience, bayed into the mic like a sheep looking for his shepherd's gate. "Baaaaa! Baaaaa!" the singer bleated." The lyrics to the Tool song "Ænema" contain the phrase: "Fuck L. Ron Hubbard, Fuck all his clones."

== Documentaries ==
Documentaries about Scientology have typically focused on allegations about the Scientology organization's intimidating behavior, greed and brainwashing. Popular examples include Louis Theroux's 2015 documentary My Scientology Movie, and Leah Remini's documentary series Scientology and the Aftermath.

== Film ==
In reviews of the 1999 film Bowfinger, some critics compared the fictional organization "MindHead" to the Church of Scientology. In the film, producer Bobby Bowfinger, played by Steve Martin, encounters difficulties involving actor Kit Ramsey, played by Eddie Murphy. Paul Clinton writes in CNN online: "'Bowfinger' could just be viewed as an out-there, over-the-top spoof about Hollywood, films, celebrities and even the Church of Scientology. But Martin has written a sweet story about a group of outsiders with impossible dreams." Andrew O'Hehir writes in Salon that "Too much of 'Bowfinger' involves the filmmakers' generically wacky pursuit of the increasingly paranoid Kit, who flees into the clutches of a pseudo-Scientology outfit called MindHead (their slogan: 'Truth Through Strength')." The Denver Post describes the Kit Ramsey character as "...petulant, paranoid and pampered, like any good star, and also a devotee of a Scientology-like religion." In a review in the San Francisco Chronicle, Wesley Morris describes Ramsey's organization as "a mock-Scientology cult called MindHead - a bit that sprung from Martin's own issues with MENSA." The Albuquerque Journal describes the MindHead organization "a rather thinly veiled but nevertheless amusing blast at Scientology," and the Fort Worth Star-Telegram characterizes it as an "organization that comes across as a thinly veiled send-up of Scientology."

Some critics perceived the 2000 film Bless the Child to be mocking Scientology because the fictionalized cult "The New Dawn" in the film mimicked Scientology's symbols and rhetoric. The following year in 2001, a film titled The Profit parodied Scientology and L. Ron Hubbard.

Until Nothing Remains is a 2010 German television film depicting a story about Scientology and its effects upon converts. In the film, a young couple are brought into Scientology by means of manipulation. Eventually, the husband decides to leave the group, losing not only his wife in the process, but also his young child and a big portion of his family's inheritance, which his wife has donated to the Church. The film is reportedly based on the real-life experiences of a German man. Scientology officials unsuccessfully attempted to prevent it from being aired.

Paul Thomas Anderson's 2012 film The Master features a religious organization called "The Cause" that has many similarities to Scientology. Also, the character of Lancaster Dodd, played by Philip Seymour Hoffman shares a physical resemblance to Scientology founder L. Ron Hubbard.

Two other films that feature new religious movements similar to Scientology are Schizopolis, and The L.A. Complex.

== Television ==
An organization with similarities to Scientology, called Selfosophy, was a central part of an episode from the second season of Millennium that aired on the Fox network on November 21, 1997, entitled "Jose Chung's Doomsday Defense." Selfosophy was created by a science fiction writer who had spent time in an insane asylum. Matt Roush of USA Today wrote that the episode was "written with the density of a Simpsons cartoon. You'll scream till you laugh, or laugh till you scream." Michael Patrick Sullivan writing for Underground Online/UGO wrote: "After a year and a half of doom and gloom stories, one of the most astounding television writers of the nineties, Darin Morgan, is allowed his fractured take on Millennium and Frank and author Jose Chung investigate murders that lead them deeply into the world of a pseudo-religion called Selfosophy (read as Scientology). Bizarre is exactly the word for it as Millennium takes sharp aim at itself and has fun with it."

Scientology was one of the inspirations for a season 9 episode of The Simpsons that aired on February 8 1998. In the episode, most of the Simpson family joins the Movementarian cult, with Homer signing a trillion-year commitment (Sea Org contracts last a billion years). Nancy Cartwright, the voice of Bart, is a Scientologist.

In a season 1 episode of Futurama aired on May 18 1999, Bender joins the religion of the Temple of Robotology, a spoof on the Church of Scientology. Series creator Matt Groening stated he received a call from the Church of Scientology concerned about the use of a similar name.

In 2005, Season 9 of South Park, "Trapped in the Closet" Stan is interviewed by a member of The Church of Scientology. The member tells him that he isn't happy, but the Church can help him for a nominal fee. Later he is given a test on an E meter machine. He scores astoundingly high, which leads the members to believe that he is the reincarnation of L. Ron Hubbard. The next day he is confronted by the entire Church of Scientology, including Tom Cruise. Stan tells Cruise that his films are "okay" and that he's not as good as "the guy who played Napoleon Dynamite". Tom locks himself in the closet. He stays there for the entire episode and is later joined by John Travolta, and R. Kelly who speaks in song, as he does in Trapped in the Closet. Meanwhile, Stan is commissioned to finish the Writings of Scientology. One of his major changes is that he wanted to make the Church free. One of the leaders of the Church reprimands him for this. He tries to tell the rest of the Church about the scam. Each individual member of the Church threatens to sue him, including Tom Cruise, John Travolta, and R. Kelly, who have finally come out of the closet.

In 2006, season four of Nip/Tuck, the characters Kimber and Matt join the Church, making them the first Scientologist regular characters on a prime-time TV show. In the latter part of the fourth season, Kimber has a hallucination in which Xenu appears to her. Though the Scientology "tech" and details are portrayed in a simplified way, the show is incorporating the Scientology storyline as a serious subplot, rather than a parody or a one-time jab. In the episode Dawn Budge, Matt moves out of the house after his parents pressure him to leave Scientology. Both characters eventually leave Scientology in the fifth season.

In 2006, season 1 episode 3 of Studio 60 on the Sunset Strip included a game-show parody titled "Science Schmience" where Simon Helberg's character impersonates Tom Cruise who explains that depression is caused "because we lost a galactic battle waged 75 million years ago by a tyrant named Xenu. He captured the souls—or thetans—of enemies and electronically implanted false concepts in them to keep them confused about his nefarious plans."

In 2008, series 5 of Peep Show. Jeremy and Super Hans go into "The New Wellness centre" (a thinly disguised parody of Scientology). Their intention is to 'out-freak the freak show', or possibly just get warm. However, within hours they are giving all of their possessions to the church, renaming themselves, and indenturing themselves in perpetuity. Mark successfully deprogammes Jeremy and by the next episode Super Hans has also left the church.

The sitcom It's Always Sunny in Philadelphia references the Church of Scientology in two episodes of its ninth (2013) and tenth (2015) seasons. In the season 9 episode Mac and Dennis Buy a Timeshare, Dee (portrayed by Kaitlin Olson) joins a pyramid scheme that uses a device that parodies the e-meter and measures "guilt stressors" in reference to the Scientologist concept of engrams. The season 10 episode Ass Kickers United: Mac and Charlie Join a Cult features much more prevalent references to Scientology as well as the 2012 film The Master, which was based on the Church of Scientology, and the allegations of CrossFit's use of cult-like practices. In the episode, Dennis (portrayed by Glenn Howerton) starts a fitness cult called Ass Kickers United in order to get Mac (portrayed by Rob McElhenney) to stop eating his thin-mint cookies. Dee talks about cults using personality tests as a way to get their members to do manual labour and gives three "Ass Kickers" an auditing session using the stress meter. The Ass Kickers United newsletter features an image of a volcano similar to the one seen on the cover of Dianetics. The episode also features part of the soundtrack from The Master.

In April 2015, following the release of Going Clear: Scientology and the Prison of Belief, Saturday Night Live aired a music video as a parody of Scientology's 1990 music video We Stand Tall. It was presented as a mock advertisement for the fictional "Church of Neurotology", and referred to several Scientology beliefs and controversies, including the claim that the world began with aliens, members who had gone missing, and billion-year contracts with the organization.

BoJack Horseman references Scientology in episode 23, aired on July 17, 2015. In the episode, the character Todd, voiced by Aaron Paul, joins an improv comedy club. The club is referred to as a 'cult', with BoJack, voiced by Will Arnett, stating "I learnt a little about cults during that year I was a Scientologist.. cus coincidentally during that year I read a book about cults". This prompts Wanda, voiced by Lisa Kudrow, to ask "wait are you saying Scientology is a cult?", to which BoJack responds "no Scientology is not a cult. Improv is a cult. I want to be very clear... this is about improv".

In November 2015, during season two of Jane the Virgin, Luciana uses Scientology audit tapes in order to attempt to blackmail ex-husband Rogelio. She threatens to make the contents of the tapes public unless he hires her back onto his TV show. Rogelio had been motivated to join Scientology due to its popularity in celebrity circles and made the tapes in as part of his initiation into the Church.

In a season 5 episode of Brooklyn Nine-Nine aired on April 15, 2018, Jake Peralta and Charles Boyle attempt to leave NutriBoom, a pyramid scheme that bears many similarities to the Church of Scientology. The leader's name is David and has a missing wife (in reference to David and Shelly Miscavige) who is proclaimed to be "definitely alive and happy". They use a celebrity spokesperson, Jay Chandrasekhar, who is seen wearing a black turtleneck in one of their "overproduced" promotional videos (in reference to Tom Cruise and the infamous video of him discussing Scientology in which he is wearing a black turtleneck) who they are blackmailing. The security guards dress in a similar way to the Church of Scientology's security guards. They have an 85-year contract (in reference to the Sea Org's billion year contract) that you can only get out of by doing manual labour. They send a PI to harass, photograph and destroy the lives of those that oppose them (in reference to Scientology's fair game policies). They say your amino acid levels are either too high or too low (in reference to the Oxford Capacity Analysis test which everybody receives a negative result from).

In the 2019 season 2 episode 8 of The Kominsky Method, Robby introduces the concepts of Scientology to Norman.

In 2023, season 7 of Rick and Morty features the episode Air Force Wong where one of President Curtis's men claims to "not believe in therapists." When Rick questions this, the man identifies as a Scientologist. Throughout the episode, the man tells Rick that he can get him in contact with a number of well known celebrity Scientologists, including Tom Cruise, John Travolta and Will Smith.

== Radio ==
Old Harry's Game features at least two references to Scientology. In series 6 episode 1 (2007), the character of Satan, while giving another character, Edith, a tour of hell, shows her the "pit of zealots", which he says is "packed solid with extremist crackpots of every variety. Far-right fundamental Christians, fanatic jihadists, diehard Communists, Fascists, Zionists, Scientologists, gun-crazy survivalists, animal liberationists, and one Millwall supporter". In series 7 episode 1 (2009), Satan claims to be the original inventor of Scientology, describing it as "totally mindless, and yet strangely attractive". He reveals that he largely based the religion on an old Flash Gordon episode and that he then told an inebbriated L. Ron Hubbard about it in a bar. He claims that Hubbard subsequently "dutifully wrote it all down, got his books published, founded Scientology and the rest, as they say, is bollocks".

== Theatre ==
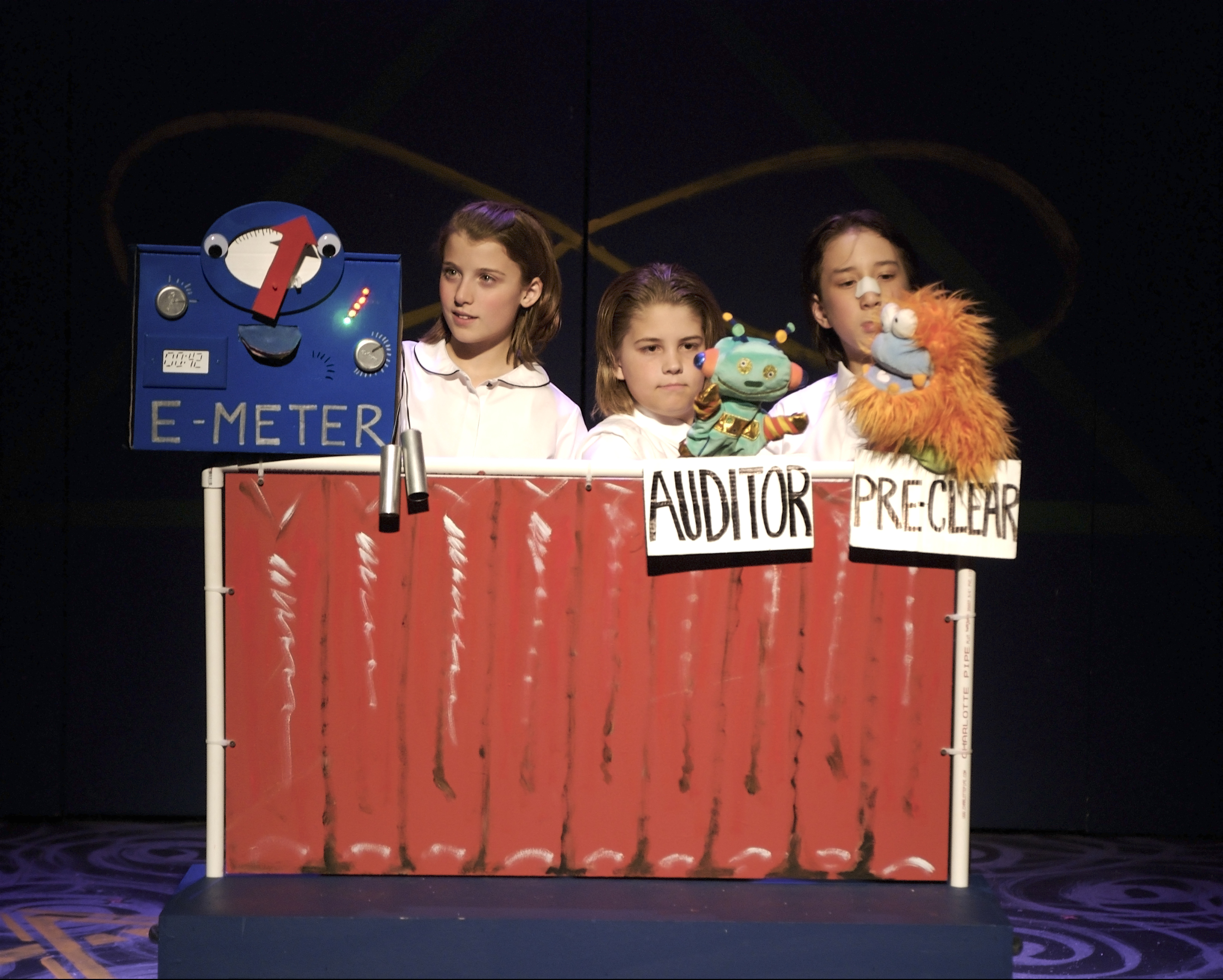
From the pageant A Very Merry Unauthorized Children's Scientology Pageant in 2008

The controversy surrounding the Church of Scientology and the (new) Cult Awareness Network organization was described in the 2002 Stephen Adly Guirgis play, Jesus Hopped the "A" Train. The character Angel tells Mary Jane that individuals who call the Cult Awareness Network looking for help will end up speaking with a Scientologist on the other end of the phone. The play was nominated for a 2003 Laurence Olivier Theatre Award, in the category: "The BBC Award for Best New Play of 2002."

In 2003, the play A Very Merry Unauthorized Children's Scientology Pageant was produced, which described a tale of the life of L. Ron Hubbard and the Church of Scientology, told from the perspective of fictional children of Scientologists. The play won a 2004 Obie Award.

In 2017, Cathy Schekelberg's performed a one-person show Squeeze My Cans about her former life in the organization.

== Video games ==
The Source Game, a short parody video styled as a retro video game

The survival-horror video game series Dead Space features a religion named "Unitology". Unitologists worship an alien artifact known as "The Marker," and believe that a contagion of reanimated undead creatures known as "Necromorphs" represents the rebirth of humanity as directed by the Marker. Unitologists advance their knowledge of church doctrines by way of giving large sums of money to the church in the form of "tithes", as well as by purchasing expensive collections of written works authored by the founder of Unitology, Michael Altman. However, the developers have stated that they designed Unitology as a pastiche of secretive cults, and that it was "never really intended to be a jab at any particular religion".

In Grand Theft Auto V The Epsilon Program is modeled on Scientology. Playable character Michael De Santa can enroll in the Epsilon Program, which forces him to perform several inefficacious tasks to be deemed worthy for the program.

A small cult called the Hubologists appears in both Fallout 2 and the Nuka-World DLC of Fallout 4, offering several therapies involving increasingly larger amounts of radiation, and claims of their leader communing with aliens.

== Social media ==
Scientology has garnered attention on apps such as TikTok, with some accounts doing 'Scientology Runs' in which people run into Scientology centers, running past staff and going as far as possible, with the goal to make a map of every floor in the building. Videos like these have gained up to 4.9 million likes. The trend led to all three Hollywood Scientology properties removing their external door handles on Sunday 26 April 2026. The organisation placed security guards behind the doors.

Ex-Sea Org member Aaron Smith-Levin runs a YouTube channel called "Growing up in Scientology" that covered Danny Masterson's criminal trial in 2023."

== See also ==
- Cults and new religious movements in literature and popular culture
- List of fictional religions
- Parody religion
- Religious satire
- Scientology beliefs and practices
- Scientology controversy
