= Inside Scientology =

Inside Scientology may refer to:

- Inside Scientology: How I Joined Scientology and Became Superhuman, 1972 book by Robert Kaufman
- Inside Scientology: meine Erfahrungen im Machtapparat der "Church", 1996 book by Peter Vossmerbäumer (ISBN 3800413337)
- Inside Scientology: The Story of America's Most Secretive Religion, 2011 book by Janet Reitman
- Inside Scientology, a television series on Scientology Network
