= Geirr =

Geirr is a given name. Notable people with the name include:

- Geirr Lystrup (1949–2025), Norwegian singer, poet, playwright, and children's writer
- Geirr Tveitt (1908–1981), Norwegian composer and pianist
- Geirr Winnem (1969), Norwegian Software Developer

== See also ==
- Geir
