= Geir =

Origin
- Origin: Old Norse
- Meaning: spear
- Region of origin: Norway

Geir is a masculine name commonly given in Norway and Iceland. It is derived from Old Norse geirr "spear", a common name element in Germanic names in general, from Proto-Germanic *gaizaz (whence also Old High German gêr, Old English gâr, Gothic gaisu).

The popularity of the given name peaked in Norway during the 1950s to 1980s, with above 2% of newly born boys named Geir during the late 1960s to 1970s. As of 2014, the National statistics office of Norway recorded 22,380 men with the given name, or 0.9% of total male population. The Old Norse spelling Geirr is also rarely given (89 individuals in Norway as of 2014). Geir is also rarely given in Sweden and Denmark.

While Geir was practically unused as a given name prior to the 1930s (and since the 2000s), -geir is the second element in a number of given names inherited from Old Norse, the most popularly given being Asgeir and Torgeir. These are a remnant of a much larger group of names including the geirr element in Old Norse.

Notable people called Geir include:

- Geir André Herrem (born 1988), Norwegian footballer
- Geir Bjørklund (born 1969), Norwegian researcher, medical/health science writer, and editor
- Geir Digerud (born 1956), Norwegian cyclist
- Geir Gripsrud (born 1948), Norwegian organizational theorist
- Geir Haarde (born 1951), Prime Minister of Iceland (2006–2009)
- Geir Hafredahl (born 1962), Norwegian politician
- Geir Hallgrímsson (1925–1990), Prime Minister of Iceland (1974–1978)
- Geir Hansteen Jörgensen (born 1968), Swedish film director
- Geir Hasund (born 1971), Norwegian footballer
- Geir Helgemo (born 1970), Norwegian contract bridge player
- Geir Isene (born 1966), Norwegian writer
- Geir Ivarsøy (1957–2006), Norwegian programmer at Opera Software
- Geir Jenssen (born 1962), Norwegian musician best known under the recording name Biosphere
- Geir Karlstad (born 1963), Norwegian speed skater, Olympic gold and bronze medalist
- Geir Lippestad (born 1964), Norwegian lawyer and politician
- Geir Selvik Malthe-Sørenssen (born 1965), Norwegian con artist
- Geir Moen (born 1969), Norwegian sprinter
- Geir Pollen (born 1953), Norwegian poet, novelist and translator
- Geir Suursild (born 1994), Estonian rower
- Geir Sveinsson (born 1964), Icelandic handball player
- Geirr Tveitt (1908–1981), Norwegian composer
- Geir Zahl (born 1975), Norwegian musician
