= Vosper =

Vosper may refer to:

== People ==
- Cyril Vosper (1935–2004), a British Scientologist and, later, critic of Scientology
- Dennis Vosper, Baron Runcorn (1916–1968), British Conservative politician
- Frank Vosper (1899–1937), British actor and playwright
- Frederick Vosper (1869–1901), an Australian politician and republican
- Sydney Curnow Vosper (1866–1942), a painter and artist
- Tessa Ann Vosper Blackstone, Baroness Blackstone (born 1942), a British Labour politician

== Organizations ==
- Vosper & Company, a defunct British shipbuilder
- VT Group, formerly known as Vosper Thornycroft, a British shipbuilder

== Other ==
- Sholing F.C., formerly known as Vosper Thorneycroft FC, a British football club
