= Isene =

Isene is a surname. Notable people with the surname include:

- Geir Isene (born 1966), Norwegian writer and business consultant
- Ola Isene (1898–1973), Norwegian opera singer and actor
- Ola Stunes Isene (born 1995), Norwegian discus thrower
