= People Puzzler =

American television game show (2021–2023)

- Genre: Game show
- Based on: People magazine Scrabble by Hasbro
- Directed by: Rob George
- Presented by: Leah Remini
- Narrated by: Michael Corbett
- Country of origin: United States
- Original language: English
- No. of seasons: 3
- No. of episodes: 325

Production
- Executive producers: Leah Remini; Scott St. John; Neal Konstantini; Dan Wakeford; Cynthia Sanz; Rachel Feinberg; Rane Laymance
- Running time: 20–22 minutes
- Production companies: Meredith Corporation; Start Entertainment; Game Show Enterprises

Original release
- Network: Game Show Network
- Release: January 18, 2021 – April 4, 2023

People Puzzler is an American television game show hosted by Leah Remini that aired on Game Show Network from January 18, 2021 to April 4, 2023.

A loose remake of The Cross-Wits, the show is inspired by the celebrity and pop-culture themed crosswords in People magazine.

== Production and broadcast ==
On June 2, 2021, Game Show Network renewed the show for a second season, which premiered on September 27, 2021. On July 18, 2022, Game Show Network renewed the show for a third season, which premiered on August 1, 2022. In 2023, reruns of the series were sold into off-network syndication to local stations. Leah Remini was nominated for a Daytime Emmy in 2022 as Outstanding Game Show Host for her work on People Puzzler.

== Gameplay ==
The game is played among three contestants. On a player's turn, they choose one of 8, 9, 10, or 11 words on the board, identifying it in the same way as a regular crossword puzzle (i.e., 1-across, etc.). The contestant is shown the first unrevealed letter in the word, and a clue is given. Correct answers score points based on the length of the word (similar to both The Cross-Wits and the 1980 NBC version of Chain Reaction), a contestant who correctly solves three words in a single turn is awarded bonus points. The contestant keeps control until they either make a mistake or score a bonus. If the contestant does make a mistake, the correct answer is not revealed, allowing the next contestant in line an opportunity to choose it again to obtain further letters and making it easier to solve (although they may choose another word). The last remaining letter in a word is never given.

Some puzzles have a "Double Word", a clue that covers two words in the puzzle, forming a two-word phrase. Both halves of a Double Word must be solved together, and correctly solving a Double Word earns the combined value of both words.

=== Round 1 ===
A contestant chosen by a random draw before the show selects one of four categories, and takes the first turn. In all cases, play passes to the right (as viewed on camera), going back to the left-most position if needed. Correctly solving a word scores 10 points per letter, the bonus for three straight correct answers is 100 points. The round lasts until the puzzle is completed or until a buzzer sounds.

=== Round 2 ===
The contestant in last place after round one, or in case of a tie, the leftmost player tied, chooses one of the remaining three categories and takes the first turn. Words are worth 20 points per letter, with a 200-point bonus for three in a row. One word is designated a "Wager Word." The first contestant to find the Wager Word is given the chance to bet any or all of their score on their ability to solve that word. A correct answer earns the amount of the wager (the 200-point bonus is also awarded if it is the contestant's third word in a row), while a wrong answer deducts the amount. If the Wager Word is not solved correctly, subsequent attempts at that word are for its natural value. In addition, if the first contestant to find the Wager Word has no points at the time, the word is also played for its natural value.

=== Tiebreaker ===
When the round ends, the contestant in third place is eliminated from further play. All losing contestants are awarded consolation prizes.

If a tie in any standing occurs at the end of the last round, or rarer, a three-way tie, a tiebreaker word is played using a buzzer. One word and one clue are displayed, and letters are randomly revealed one at a time, similarly to Wheel of Fortune's "Toss-Up" puzzles. Contestants may buzz in at any time after the clue is read. A contestant who guesses correctly advances, while a contestant who guesses incorrectly is eliminated. The process is repeated if necessary for a three-way tie.

=== Head to Head Showdown ===
The contestant in the lead, or in some shows with the lowest score after round 2, is shown two new puzzles and selects one to play. The gameplay in this round is similar to that of the "Crossfire" round on The Cross-Wits. The contestant is given 60 seconds to solve all 10 words (time starts when host Remini finishes reading the first clue). The contestant may attempt the words in any order, may take as many guesses as desired before passing, and may pass and return to a word as often as needed until time runs out. As in previous rounds, a letter is given the first time the contestant chooses a given word, the contestant is given additional letters upon returning to the word after passing. Each word solved is worth 50 points per letter, and solving all 10 words is worth a 1,000-point bonus. The two puzzles do not necessarily have the same number of points available. The other contestant is then given the other puzzle to solve under the same rules. The contestant in the lead at the end of this round wins $1,000, the championship, and advances to the "Fast Puzzle" round to play for $10,000. If the trailing player is unable to catch up, the game ends immediately. If, however, a tie remains, a sudden-death word will determine the champion.

=== Fast Puzzle Round ===
The champion is shown four categories, each corresponding to a three-word puzzle, and chooses the three puzzles they would like to play. They have a minute to solve all nine words, and may switch between words or between puzzles as often as needed. If the champion solves all nine words within a minute, they win $10,000.
