= Tony Ortega =

American author and journalist monitoring Scientology

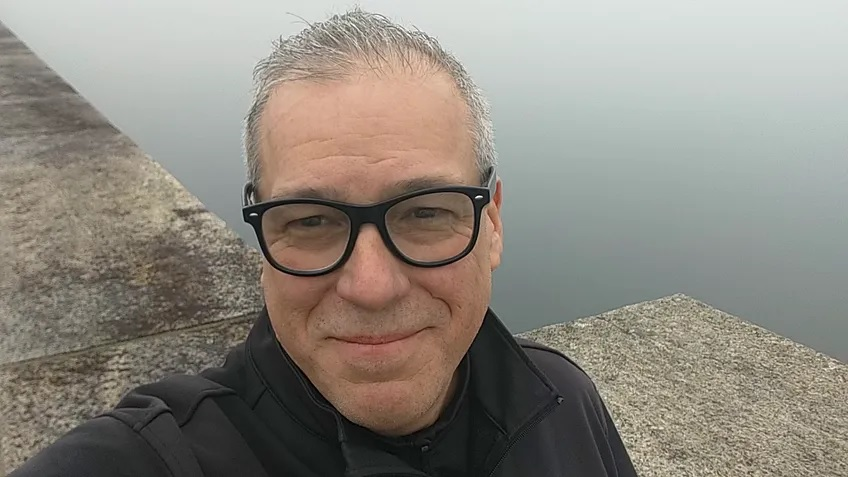
- Ortega at Kensico Dam
- Born: Los Angeles, California, U.S.
- Education: California State University, Fullerton (BA, MA)
- Occupations: Journalist, author, and editor
- Known for: Coverage of Scientology
- Notable work: The Unbreakable Miss Lovely
- Ortega's voice (June 2019) Ortega introduces himself
- Website: tonyortega.org

Anthony "Tony" Ortega is an American journalist and editor who is best known for his coverage of the Church of Scientology and his blog The Underground Bunker. He was executive editor of Raw Story from 2013 until 2015. Previously, he had been a journalist at the New Times LA, the editor-in-chief of the Broward-Palm Beach New Times from 2005 to 2007, and the editor-in-chief of The Village Voice from 2007 to 2012. In 2015, he was executive editor of the YouTube channel TheLipTV. He is author of the non-fiction book The Unbreakable Miss Lovely: How the Church of Scientology tried to destroy Paulette Cooper, about journalist Paulette Cooper and the Church of Scientology's attempts to silence her after her own book was published.

== Background and education ==
Tony Ortega was raised in Anaheim, California. He received the John Jay Scholarship to attend Columbia University, where he completed three semesters before continuing his studies at California State University, Fullerton, where he obtained his B.A. and M.A. in English. Ortega pursued more graduate work at UC Santa Cruz prior to landing his first journalism job as a freelancer at the Phoenix New Times in 1995. In 1996, Ortega reported on alleged corruption in the office of Maricopa County Sheriff Joe Arpaio, writing a series of stories concerning "misuse of state funds, poor morale inside the department, the high cost of the sheriff's posses and evidence of abuse of jail inmates," for which he was nominated for the Arizona Press Club's Virg Hill Award in 1997.

As a graduate student at the University of California, Ortega researched the California Agricultural Strike 1933 under the tutelage of Louis Owens. He later wrote an article about his research in the Village Voice. In her review of Ortega's article, Carolyn Kellogg wrote, "When Ortega gets his grandfather and great half-uncle to tell him stories of the strike, it's exactly the first-person narrative he'd been hoping for. But I found, reading the stories in his article, that they were simply personal anecdotes—interesting anecdotes, sure, but simple anecdotes. The men camped under eucalyptus trees. They played clarinet and violin for the strikers."

Tony's father, also named Tony Ortega (1938–2019), was a musician, guitarist, and songwriter, starting in the late 1950s and throughout his life. He also had a career in the steel industry, joining at the entry level and rising through the ranks to become a general manager.

== Career ==
Ortega spent nearly seventeen years working for various alternative weekly newspapers in the Voice Media Group (VMG). He has worked at the Phoenix New Times, the New Times LA and The Pitch. His earliest positions ranged from staff writer to assistant editor and managing editor. In 2001, Ortega spent time with and profiled detective and conspiracy theorist William Dear for the New Times LA newspaper after Dear spent several years constructing a case around Jason Simpson (son of O.J Simpson) in the O. J. Simpson murder case. Ortega was highly critical of his methods, in particular spending two weeks impersonating a doctor in an attempt to access Jason Simpson's medical records.

He became the editor-in-chief at the Broward-Palm Beach New Times in 2005 and then at The Village Voice in 2007. He was executive editor at online news website Raw Story from 2013 to 2015.

== Coverage of Scientology ==
Tony Ortega has been covering Scientology for over 20 years and, according to the Phoenix New Times, "has become one of the foremost reporters on the Scientology beat".

Ortega first reported on Scientology in 1995 while working at the Phoenix New Times. after he came across a Letter to the editor from Rick Alan Ross who complained that a story published in The Arizona Republic about Ross's loss of a lawsuit against him left out the fact that the plaintiff was actually hired by the Church of Scientology to sue Ross, which also caused harm to his Cult Awareness Network. Ortega continued covering the subject of Scientology throughout his career under various media outlets in the Voice Media Group. In September 2012, Ortega publicly announced his resignation from The Village Voice in a post to the Voice's "Runnin' Scared" blog.

The executive editor of the Voice told the Media Decoder blog of The New York Times that Ortega "...did a great job for us and managed a difficult transition in a miserable economy... During that time he became the single most informed reporter on Scientology. No one is better positioned to write the book on that organization."

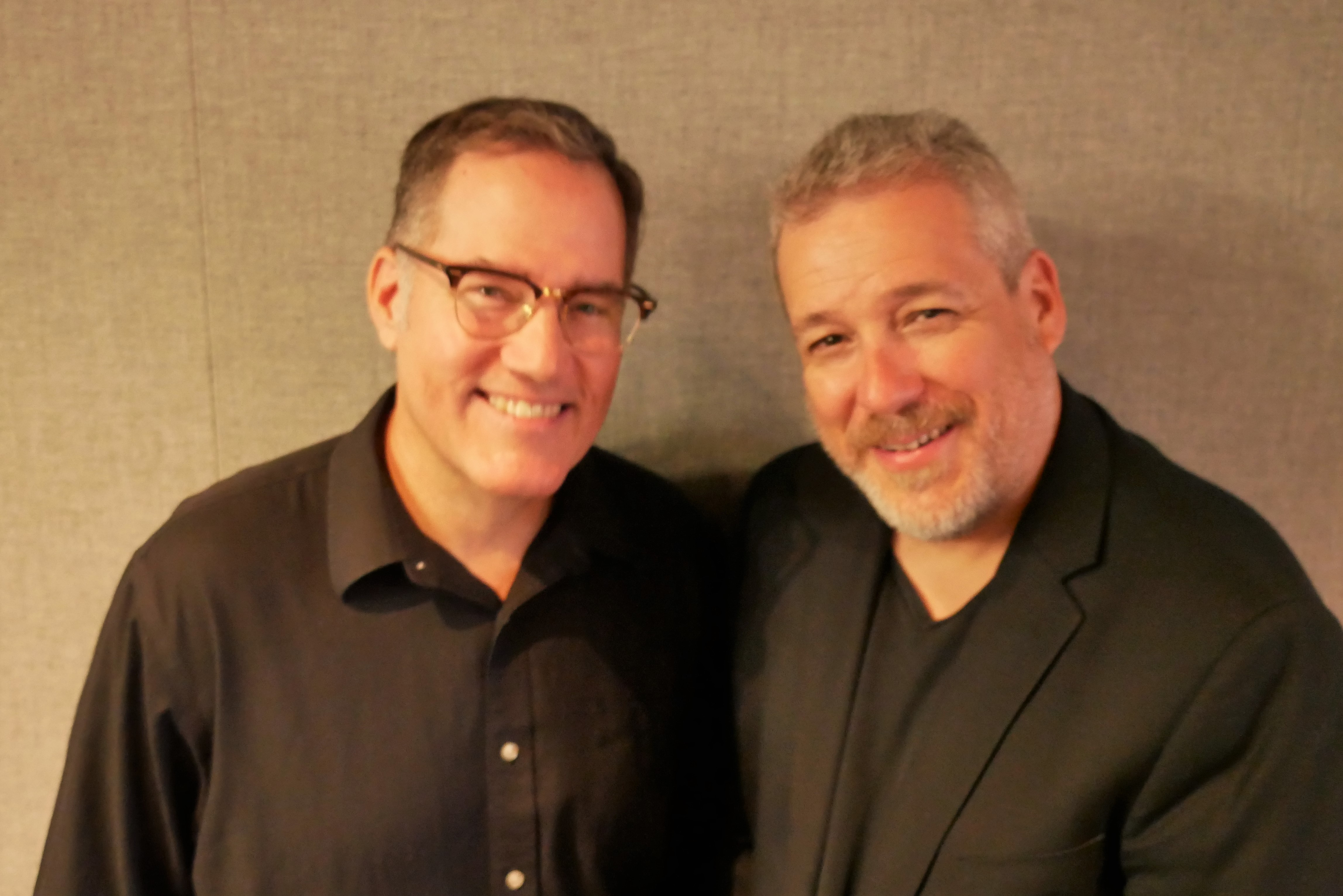
Jim Underdown and Tony Ortega at HowdyCon 2019

Ortega was featured in Alex Gibney's documentary Going Clear, discussing how Scientology smeared critics. On the way to the Sundance Film Festival both Ortega and another film participant, ex-Scientologist Marc Headley, were surveilled and photographed at Salt Lake City airport by presumed members of the Church of Scientology, with the New York Times noting "The documentary showed ex-Scientologists being harassed and surveilled, a tactic that according to the film, is part of the doctrine of the church: its founder, L. Ron Hubbard, said that all of the church's attackers were criminals whose own misdeeds should be exposed".

In 2015, Ortega was informed by the United States Attorney that his emails had been hacked by New York private investigator Eric Saldarriaga in the previous year. Saldarriaga had received payment by clients whose names remain private and used an illegal overseas hacking group to break into several private accounts including Ortega's and ex-Scientologist and former church spokesperson Mike Rinder. Both Ortega and Rinder filed victim impact statements and requested the client's name(s) be made public. Goldstein in the New York Times reported "The client is said to be someone who has done investigations on behalf of the Church of Scientology, said people briefed on the case but not authorized to speak publicly." Fifty (50) victims of hacking were identified and Saldarriaga was given a 3-month prison sentence in June 2015. Saldarriaga claimed he feared retaliation from naming clients while cooperating with the FBI and was never required to name the client publicly in court.

In September 2018, Ortega started publishing short video clips of issues in Scientology that had been previously covered by his website. In the first video he linked Doug Dohring, the founder and CEO of Age of Learning, Inc. (also known as ABCmouse) with large donations to the Church of Scientology.

=== The Underground Bunker ===
After leaving the Voice in September 2012, Ortega began writing a freelance blog entitled The Underground Bunker that is focused mainly on Scientology. His website has been described as "the most popular blog on Scientology", "devastating" to the organisation and "influential". It concentrates on monitoring activity within Scientology and is updated daily.

=== The Unbreakable Miss Lovely ===
In May 2015, Ortega released a book about Scientology critic Paulette Cooper and her conflict with the organization, entitled The Unbreakable Miss Lovely, which was published by Silvertail Books, an imprint of London-based literary agent and independent publisher Humfrey Hunter. The book focuses on the journalist Paulette Cooper, codenamed "Miss Lovely" by the church, who became one of the first journalists to investigate the practices of harassment and intimidation of anyone who spoke publicly against the organization with her own published book, The Scandal of Scientology. Ortega's research into Cooper's story uncovered many previously unpublished operations by the church against Cooper, and included testimony from FBI Special Agent Christine Hansen. In an official response to the book from the church a spokesperson declined to revisit the subject and referred to Ortega as "a parasite". The book was well received by critics of Scientology and has been described as among the best of the genre as well as shocking. Although Cooper reached a financial settlement with the church in 1985, Ortega was accompanied by Cooper on the subsequent international book tour.

The Unbreakable Miss Lovely ... is a comprehensive account of Paulette Cooper's story. By tracking down sources no previous investigator had interviewed, digging into neglected documents, and with some help from individuals who have left Scientology as well as from his subject, Ortega has written the definitive account of the lengths to which Scientology went in its ultimately failed attempts to destroy Paulette Cooper.

— Jim Lippard

=== Battlefield Scientology ===
In 2018, Tony Ortega and Paulette Cooper co-authored the book Battlefield Scientology : Exposing L. Ron Hubbard's Dangerous "Religion".

=== The Cult Awareness Podcast ===
Ortega is the co-host, along with James Underdown and Jerry Minor, of The Cult Awareness Podcast that discusses Scientology, Jehovah's Witnesses, and other subjects.

== Works ==
- Ortega, Tony (2015). The Unbreakable Miss Lovely: How the Church of Scientology tried to destroy Paulette Cooper. Silvertail Books. ISBN 9781511639378.
- Ortega, Tony; Cooper, Paulette (2018). Battlefield Scientology : Exposing L. Ron Hubbard's Dangerous "Religion". CreateSpace. ISBN 9781727131567.

== See also ==
- Scientology controversies
- Scientology and the Internet
- Bibliography of books critical of Scientology
