= The Mind Benders (Vosper book) =

1971 book by Cyril Vosper

- Book Cover, 1971 Edition, hard cover
- Author: Cyril Vosper
- Language: English
- Subject: Scientology
- Publisher: Neville Spearman Limited
- Publication date: 1971
- Publication place: United Kingdom
- Media type: Print (Hardcover)
- Pages: 188
- ISBN: 0-85435-061-6
- OCLC: 215728
- Dewey Decimal: 131.3/5
- LC Class: BP605.S2 V68

The Mind Benders was written by Cyril Vosper, a Scientologist of 14 years who had become disillusioned. Published in 1971 (hardback, Neville Spearman, ISBN 0-85435-061-6) and reprinted in 1973 (softcover, Mayflower, ISBN 0-583-12249-3), it was the first book on Scientology written by an ex-member and the first critical book on Scientology to be published (narrowly beating Inside Scientology by Robert Kaufman). It describes the lower levels of Scientology and its philosophy in detail (it does not go into the Operating Thetan levels) and it includes the story of Vosper's expulsion from Scientology.

The book was released as an electronic edition on the internet with the approval of Vosper by the old Cult Awareness Network, in April 1996 and then again in August 1997.

== Attempted bans by Scientology ==
=== In the UK ===
In 1972, the Church of Scientology sued to prevent publication, claiming that as a condition of taking the Special Briefing Course at Saint Hill, Vosper had agreed not to divulge its content to anyone who was not "Clear". Lord Denning dismissed the case, arguing that the material was sufficiently dangerous that public interest would override the confidentiality agreement.

The hardback edition was rushed to print owing to the legal action. Vosper regarded the paperback—which was proofread and had an extra chapter on the litigation—as the authoritative edition. Accordingly, the case Hubbard v Vosper is read in many courses about copyright law.

Vosper referenced the legal troubles that the 1971 edition of the book encountered, by titling the 1973 edition The Mind Benders: The Book They Tried to Ban.

=== In Canada ===
The Church of Scientology of Canada attempted to ban the book in libraries in Canada. In June 1974, libraries were advised that if they do not remove the books: Scientology: The Now Religion, Inside Scientology, The Scandal of Scientology and The Mind Benders from their shelves, they would be named in a lawsuit. Two different library boards in Ontario, Canada, had been served with writs.

After obtaining out-of-court settlements of US$7,500 and US$500 and apologies from the publishers of two of the works (Dell Publishing and Tower Publications), Scientology further threatened to sue any library or bookstore that carried them. After certain libraries in Canada refused to remove the books from their shelves, they were sued by Scientology. One Canadian library reported the theft of a book critical of Scientology from its shelves.

These incidents were later reported in a chronological timeline of censorship in British Columbia.

== See also ==
- Bibliography of books critical of Scientology
- Scientology controversies
