= Ali's Smile =

Book by William S. Burroughs II

Ali's Smile: Naked Scientology
- 1978 Expanded media edition
- Author: William S. Burroughs
- Language: English
- Subject: Scientology
- Genre: Short story
- Publisher: Unicorn
- Publication date: 1971
- Publication place: United States
- Media type: Print
- ISBN: 3880300119

Ali's Smile: Naked Scientology is a collection of essays and a short story by American writer William S. Burroughs (1914–1997). First published in 1971 as the short story "Ali's Smile", the book eventually contained a group of previously published newspaper articles as well, all of which address Scientology. Burroughs had been interested in Scientology throughout the 1960s, believing that its methods might help combat a controlling society. He joined the Church of Scientology later in the decade. However, he became disenchanted with the authoritarian nature of the organization. In 1970 Burroughs had published a "considered statement" on Scientology's methods because he felt they were significant enough to warrant commentary. These pieces were later gathered together into Ali's Smile: Naked Scientology, which religious studies scholar Hugh B. Urban describes as a "nonscholarly popular exposé of Scientology". Burroughs's texts argue that while some of Scientology's therapies are worthwhile, the dogmatic nature of the group and its secrecy are harmful.

== Background ==
William S. Burroughs was an avant-garde author whom several important critics consider the most important American writer since World War II. Sometimes called the "Godfather of Punk literature", he adopted a persona that Matt Theado, a scholar of the Beats, describes as "a tormented but supremely curious person who explored the dark side of the human consciousness." Burroughs often probed contentious social and political problems with "a cold-blooded, almost insectlike presence" that influenced popular culture as well as literature.

Burroughs believed readers needed to take an active part in reshaping their own reality through reading. For example, works such as the controversial novel Naked Lunch (1959) dealt with his concerns regarding "the battle against control", and Burroughs wrote others "might see the control that governments, religions, greedy human beings, and their own cravings for drugs, sex, or power often hold over them". Theado writes that Burroughs saw words as "instruments of control that allow evil forces to impose their will over people", and he attempted to use words themselves to combat this problem. He wrote in a way that would allow both him and his readers to redefine words and to create new levels of meaning, thereby liberating them from social control.

His concerns about social control and language led Burroughs to write at length about Scientology. He had been interested in Scientology since the early 1960s, having been introduced to the concepts of its founder L. Ron Hubbard by artist Brion Gysin. Burroughs's early novels emphasized the power of Scientology to combat a controlling society. For example, in both The Ticket That Exploded (1962) and Nova Express (1964), Scientology, along with the cut-up technique, silence, and apomorphine (which he believed was an extremely effective treatment for heroin addiction), allows the characters to resist social control. These works reflected Burroughs's initial belief that Scientology could be an instrument of liberation from social control, much as he used his own cut-up style of writing. He sought to use cut-ups "to expose the arbitrary nature and manipulative power of all linguistic systems", and connected cut-ups to the theories of the self expounded by Hubbard's Dianetics. As religious studies scholar John Lardas explains, "the cut-up method was the evangelical counterpart of Scientology in that it was intended to alter a reader's consciousness".

In 1967 Burroughs became a more serious devotee to Scientology, taking several courses and in 1968 becoming what the Church of Scientology calls "clear"—a psychological state in which one has managed to eradicate the harmful influence of their reactive mind by removing engrams, traumatic mental images, from their subconscious through Scientology's auditing process. In his works, Burroughs represented the process that Scientologists refer to as "clearing" memories as a step towards becoming an active rather than passive member of society. Scientology thus appealed to Burroughs because it "confirmed his belief that consciousness is akin to a tape recording that can be rewound, fast-forwarded, or even erased". Burroughs believed that Scientology's practice of auditing had helped him resolve some traumatic life experiences, and "came to regard the E-Meter as a useful device for deconditioning". However, he had "growing doubts about some of the other Scientology technology, and grave reservations about their policy as an organisation". He became frustrated by the authoritarian nature of the organization, and as biographer Ted Morgan writes, "... had hoped to find a method of personal emancipation and had found instead another control system." In a similar vein, Burroughs was both intrigued by Scientology's study of language, but felt distaste for the way it was being utilized:

They [the Church of Scientology] have a great deal of very precise data on words and the effects produced by words – a real science of communication. But I feel that their presentation has been often deplorable and that as a science, a body of knowledge, it is definitely being vitiated by a dogmatic policy.

By 1970, Burroughs had severed connections with the Church of Scientology. He was eventually expelled from the organization and declared to be in "Condition of Treason". He became increasingly disenchanted with the group and wrote a series of critical articles published in Mayfair. Burroughs also forced one of their headquarters to relocate by publicizing photos of it.

== Publication and contents ==
Ali's Smile, Burroughs's short story on Scientology, was originally published in a limited-edition run of 99 copies by Unicorn in 1971. A recording of Burroughs reading the story was simultaneously released. Two years later, Expanded Media Editions issued a revised and enlarged version titled Ali's Smile: Naked Scientology, which contained a series of articles, most of which had been previously published in newspapers and magazines. In 1970 Burroughs had published a "considered statement" on Scientology's methods because he felt that they were significant enough to warrant commentary. This statement articulates what he calls the group's "precise and efficient" therapeutic methods, however he also criticizes the authoritarian nature of the institution, describing Hubbard's statements as fascistic and comparing their internal surveillance methods to that of the FBI and CIA. He also condemns the "unquestioning acceptance" demanded of Scientologists as well as the institution's secrecy. These pieces were later gathered together into Ali's Smile: Naked Scientology, which religious studies scholar Hugh Urban describes as a "nonscholarly popular exposé of Scientology". In 1985, Expanded Media Editions published a bilingual German and English edition.

There is a basic incompatibility between any organization and freedom of thought. Suppose Newton had founded a Church of Newtonian Physics and refused to show his formula to anyone who doubted the tenets of Newtonian Physics?

— "Burroughs on Scientology"

"Burroughs on Scientology" is an opinion piece originally published in the Los Angeles Free Press on 6 March 1970. It begins "In view of the fact that my articles and statements on Scientology may have influenced young people to associate themselves with the so called Church of Scientology, I feel an obligation to make my present views on the subject quite clear." Burroughs states that some Scientology practices have value: "Some of the techniques are highly valuable and warrant further study and experimentation." He is critical of the Church of Scientology's organizational policy and organizations in general, and Scientology's attempts to keep many of its counseling methods secret, and writes "On the other hand I am in flat disagreement with the organizational policy."

"William Burroughs: Open Letter to Mr. Garden Mustain" was originally published in the East Village Other on 7 July 1970. The East Village Other introduction to Burroughs' piece notes that the open letter "is Mr. Burroughs' final answer to his critics and to Mister Gorden Mustain who attacked him for his position on Scientology in the pages of the "L.A. Free Press". In it he asks the inevitable question to be faced by us all, whether we be in a professional status or not: 'We would like to know where Scientology and Mr. Hubbard stand on the Vietnam war, on sexual freedom, militant students, Black Power, pot, Red China, the politics of the American Narcotics department and the CIA. If it comes to a revolution: which side would you fight on?'"

"William Burroughs on Inside Scientology by Robert Kaufman" was originally published in Rolling Stone on 26 October 1972. It is a book review of Inside Scientology, which was embroiled in a legal controversy. In the review, Burroughs relates his personal experiences as a Scientologist and describes himself as an anthropologist. Burroughs begins by praising Kaufman's decision to reveal confidential upper-level Scientology teachings in the book: "Mr. Kaufman has shown real courage in publishing Hubbard's so-called confidential materials for the first time in Inside Scientology."

"Letter to Rolling Stone" by R. Sorrell (Church of Scientology) was originally published in Rolling Stone on 5 December 1972. Sorrell wrote on behalf of the Church of Scientology to Rolling Stone, asserting that statements made by Burroughs in his review of Inside Scientology were inaccurate. Sorrell noted that the book had been involved in legal controversy and commented: "I have included here an itemization of these inaccuracies with documentation to show that Mr. Burroughs may be a writer but cannot always be trusted to be an accurate one."

William Burroughs, "Ali's Smile" (1970)
2-minute excerpt of Burroughs reading his short story

"Answer to R. Sorrell's Letter" by William Burroughs is a point-by-point response to Sorrell's letter in Rolling Stone. In total, Burroughs addresses 28 issues, including "Scientology's security checks", fair gaming, excommunication, the financial dealings of Scientology, Scientology terminology such as "Wog", and the efficacy of the E-meter as a lie detector.

"Ali's Smile" by William Burroughs is a short story originally published by Unicorn in 1971 and later republished in Burroughs's collection of short stories, Exterminator! (1973). At the opening of the story, Clinch Smith, a former colonial official, is living in an English town overshadowed by a giant slag heap. He is upset when he receives a letter from a Scientologist friend saying that he will "disconnect" from Smith, describing him as a "suppressive person". A kris hanging on the wall of his room reminds Smith of Ali, whom he had met 30 years ago in Malaya. Ali had been put under a latah spell by an old woman, forcing him to dance in the marketplace. Smith rescued Ali, making the young man his houseboy. Ali returned to the market, however, and ran amok, killing several of the women with the kris. Smith was forced to shoot Ali, and kept the kris as a souvenir. Back in the present, Smith feels compelled to take the kris from the wall and goes to town, where there is a fight going on between hippies and locals, with members of Scientology's Sea Org in the crowd as well. Smith goes on a killing spree with the kris, which seems to have a life of its own. He stabs Lord Westfield, a Home Office official who has asked a private investigator to infiltrate a Scientology organization, a woman, and several Sea Org members, and then a bystander shoots him dead. Police and more combatants prepare to join the fight. As they do so, the slag heap collapses and buries everyone. At the end, the "ghost face" of Ali smiles over all.

== Reception ==
In Michael B. Goodman and Lemuel B. Coley's 1990 bibliography of the works of and criticism on Burroughs, described as "the most comprehensive and up-to-date guide to Burroughs' primary and secondary materials", there are no contemporary reviews listed for Ali's Smile: Naked Scientology.

== See also ==
- Bibliography of books critical of Scientology
- Scientology controversies
