= Leah Remini: It's All Relative =

2014 American TV series

- Genre: Reality television
- Starring: Leah Remini
- Country of origin: United States
- Original language: English
- No. of seasons: 2
- No. of episodes: 26

Production
- Executive producers: Leah Remini; Deirdre Gurney; Scott Gurney; Mike Odair; Gabriela Tavakoli
- Camera setup: Multiple
- Running time: 19 minutes
- Production companies: Gurney Productions; No Seriously Productions

Original release
- Network: TLC
- Release: July 10, 2014 – September 2, 2015

Leah Remini: It's All Relative is an American reality television series starring Leah Remini. The series premiered on July 10, 2014, and airs on TLC. It follows Remini's day-to-day life as she takes on the roles of mother, wife, and friend.

In March 2015, TLC renewed the show for a second season. The 14-episode season began in July 2015. In 2016 Leah Remini announced on her social page that the show would not return for a third season. However, in September 2017, she revealed that she might be interested in doing another season.

== Cast ==
- Leah Remini, an American actress and comedian
- Angelo Pagán, Leah's husband
- Sofia Pagán, Leah and Angelo's daughter
- Vicki Marshall, Leah's mother
- George Marshall, Leah's step-father
- Shannon Farrara, Leah's sister
- William, Leah's brother-in-law and Shannon's husband
- Trish, Sofia's nanny
- Lou, family friend/handyman/security
- Raffy, Leah's personal assistant

== Episodes ==
=== Season 1 (2014) ===
No. in season	Title	Original release date	U.S. viewers (millions)
1	"Welcome to the Family"	July 10, 2014	1.28
Leah decides to host a party for the friends who stuck by her family after they left the Church of Scientology.
2	"Putting the "Fun" in Funeral"	July 10, 2014	1.01
Leah and Shannon's mother wants to have a living funeral so the girls agree to plan one.
3	"What's the Point, Mom?"	July 17, 2014	N/A
Leah and her mother spend time together by improving the restaurant's decor.
4	"Lady Is a Tramp Stamp"	July 17, 2014	0.90
The family tries to stop mom Vicki from receiving a tramp stamp. At the restaurant, George has a difficult time using the cash register.
5	"Whole Lotta Shakin' Goin' On"	July 24, 2014	1.14
Angelo wants the family to be prepared for earthquakes. Trish shares her hobbies with the family.
6	"The Breast Birthday Ever"	July 24, 2014	1.14
Shannon wants breast augmentation for her 30th birthday. Leah and Shannon go on a double date. Shannon is surprised with a boob-shaped cake at her birthday party.
7	"New York, New York — Part 1"	July 31, 2014	0.97
8	"New York, New York — Part 2"	July 31, 2014	0.99
9	"I Love You, Bra"	August 7, 2014	1.03
10	"All up in Your Grill"	August 7, 2014	0.99
11	"Let's Get Campy — Part 1"	August 14, 2014	1.06
12	"Let's Get Campy — Part 2"	August 14, 2014	N/A

=== Season 2 (2015) ===
No. in season	Title	Original release date	U.S. viewers (millions)
1	"You Dropped a Mom on Me"	May 10, 2015	N/A
2	"Life After Scientology"	July 15, 2015	N/A
3	"Leah and Chelsea Handler's Dating Tips"	July 22, 2015	N/A
4	"Bucket List"	July 22, 2015	N/A
5	"I'm a Huge Star in Malaysia"	July 29, 2015	N/A
6	"Happy Colonoscopy!"	July 29, 2015	N/A
7	"Feeling Blue"	August 5, 2015	N/A
8	"House Calls"	August 5, 2015	N/A
9	"Give It A Shot, Leah"	August 12, 2015	N/A
10	"Who's the Joke On?"	August 12, 2015	N/A
11	"The Dance Off"	August 19, 2015	N/A
12	""Hmm, That's a Problem""	August 19, 2015	N/A
13	"Weighting to Exhale"	August 26, 2015	N/A
14	"The Camera Doesn't Lie"	August 26, 2015	N/A
15	"That's Life"	September 2, 2015	N/A

== Reception ==
Melissa Camacho of Common Sense Media gave the show 3 out of 5 stars.
