= Troublemaker: Surviving Hollywood and Scientology =

Book by Leah Remini

- Author: Leah Remini
- Language: English
- Subject: Church of Scientology
- Publisher: Ballantine Books
- Publication date: November 3, 2015
- Publication place: United States
- Media type: Print (Hardcover, paperback)
- Pages: 256
- ISBN: 978-1-101-88696-0 (Hardcover)

Troublemaker: Surviving Hollywood and Scientology is a biographical memoir by the American actress, producer, author, and comedian Leah Remini. Published in November 2015, it chronicles her life, her acting career, her experiences as a member of the Church of Scientology from a young age, and her subsequent split from Scientology. The book received favorable reviews and became a bestseller soon after publication, though the Church of Scientology was strongly critical of it.

== Background and synopsis ==
Troublemaker is, as The Huffington Post puts it, "the first book to reveal the perspective of one of Scientology's many celebrity members". Remini announced plans for the book soon after splitting from Scientology in 2013, when she told Us magazine that it would "include my experiences, everything that's taboo to talk about". It was published on November 3, 2015, by the Random House imprint Ballantine Books, which described it as "bold, brash, and bravely confessional".

The book describes Remini's more than 30 years in Scientology – which in hindsight she views as "often deeply strange" – joining as a child along with her parents. She became a popular child star and a successful adult actor, making her one of Scientology's top celebrities. Although she had a troubled time as a member of the elite Sea Org when she was a teenager, she was a committed and high-profile member who was on friendly terms with the church's leadership. She claims to have contributed millions of dollars to the Church Of Scientology for the innumerable training courses she completed and for the Church's Building Fund as well as for its various, ostensibly altruistic, outreach programs around the world. However, she grew disenchanted with the church and in particular its leader David Miscavige and fellow Scientologist Tom Cruise, getting herself into trouble for asking the wrong questions, especially about the unexplained disappearance of Miscavige's wife Shelly. She was subjected to retaliatory write-ups and punishments and eventually quit, but faced the loss of all her friends from Scientology, who "disconnected" from her. She concludes:

I am a combative, inquisitive, argumentative person, and I will never allow anyone to change that. I still have anger, but I’m okay with that because it fuels me to continue to right any wrongs I may see. And it's because of that and the support of my true friends and family that I was able to fight my way out of Scientology and see the world for the first time.

== Reception ==
Troublemaker received extensive publicity before release, including a major interview on the 20/20 show and a cover story in People magazine ("My Escape From Scientology"). The book became a bestseller shortly after its release, reaching the #1 place on The New York Times Best Seller list. It also recorded strong ebook sales, reaching #1 on Apple's iBooks chart.

Newsweek described Troublemaker as "a breezy and snarky 250 pages of Scientology dirt" that "offer[s] up some juicy tidbits from her decades in the church". Under the Radar magazine called it "a brave book" written in a "frank and readable style" which is "engaging from the first page to the end". Entertainment Weekly awarded it a B+, calling it "full of startling, sad information" and concluding "inside reports like this don't come around often, and they're worth reading when they do."

The Church of Scientology was strongly critical of the book, releasing a statement accusing Remini of having become a "bitter ex-Scientologist". It told her to "move on with her life instead of pathetically exploiting her former religion, her former friends and other celebrities for money and attention to appear relevant again."

In the wake of the book's publication, former Scientologists contacted Remini to tell her about their own experiences in the Church. This prompted her to develop Leah Remini: Scientology and the Aftermath, a three-season television series for the cable network A&E, which achieved major ratings success when it was first broadcast in late 2016/early 2017.

== See also ==
- Bibliography of books critical of Scientology
- Scientology controversies
