= Scientology: The Now Religion =

Non-fiction book on Scientology by George Malko

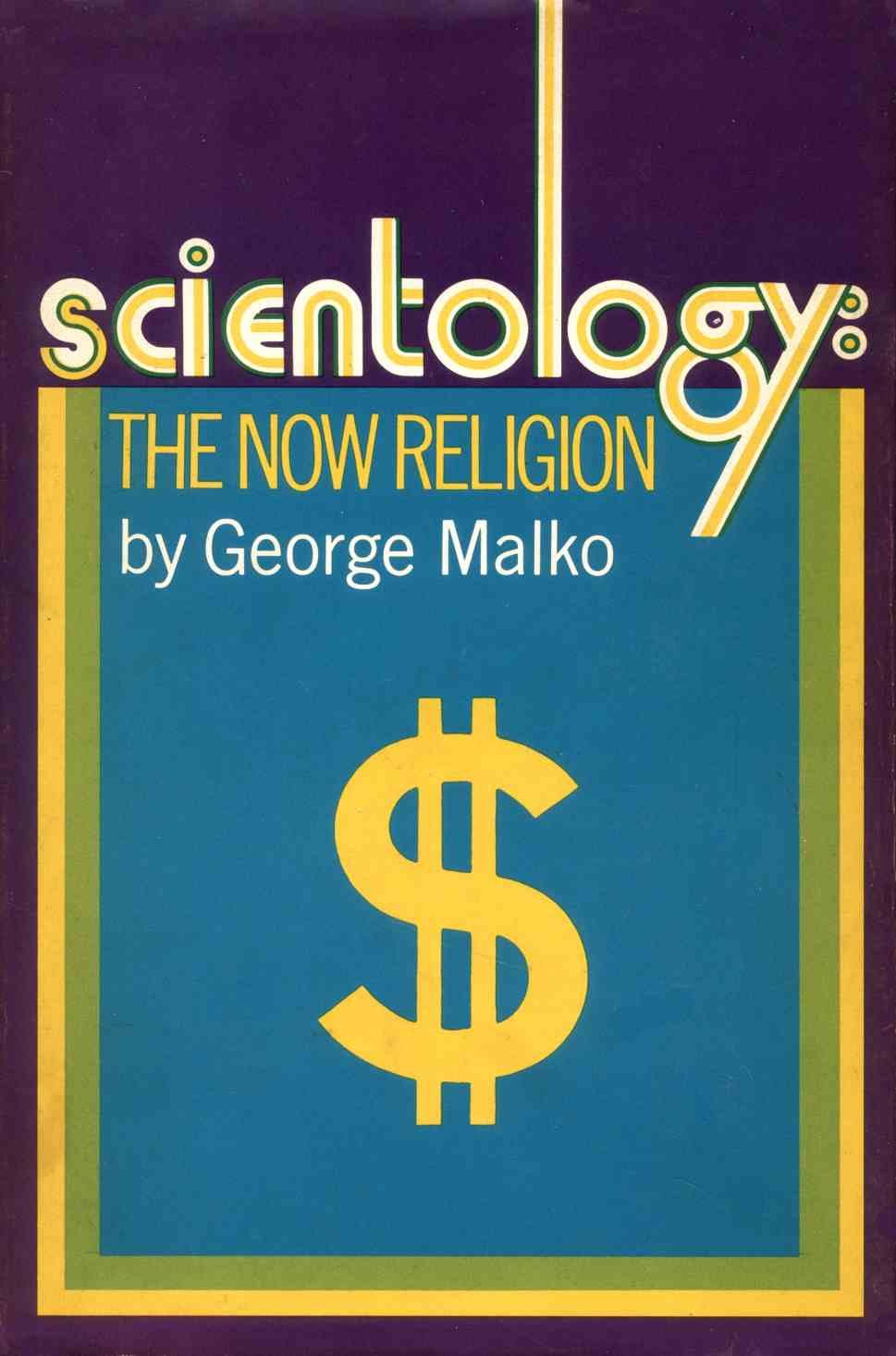
- Cover
- Author: George Malko
- Language: English
- Subject: Scientology
- Publisher: Delacorte Press
- Publication date: 1970
- Publication place: United States
- Media type: Print (Hardcover)
- Pages: 205
- ISBN: 978-1-112-96373-5
- OCLC: 115065
- Dewey Decimal: 131.3/5
- LC Class: BP605.S2 M3
- Followed by: Take What You Will

Scientology: The Now Religion is a book on Scientology, written by George Malko. The book was published in 1970 in Hardcover format by Delacorte Press, and then in a paperback edition in 1971, by Dell Publishing. The book was the first full-length analysis of the history surrounding the founding of the Church of Scientology, and L. Ron Hubbard. Malko conducted interviews with members, and provides analysis about certain practices.

The book received favorable reviews from critics, with some praising it as effectively breaking down many of Scientology's controversial practices, though another called its explanations of aspects of Scientology confusing and unsatisfying. The Church of Scientology fought to prevent the sale of the book, suing Malko and the book's publisher for defamation.

== Background ==
George Malko is a freelance writer and film producer.

== Contents ==
Malko conducted interviews with members, and provides analysis about certain practices. According to Jon Atack in A Piece of Blue Sky, "author George Malko wrote that 'Hubbard's extensive discussion of things sexual, his concern with abortions, beatings, coitus under duress, flatulence which causes pressure on the foetus, certain cloacal references, all suggest to me a fascination which borders on the obsessive, as if he possessed a deep-seated hatred of women. All of them are being beaten, most of them prove to be unfaithful, few babies are wanted.'"

== Publication and reception ==
The book was published in 1970 in Hardcover format by Delacorte Press, and then in a paperback edition in 1971, by Dell Publishing.

A review in The New York Times by the critic John Leonard praised the book, who described Malko as running many of Scientology's controversial practices "through the sausage machine", and the book as "mind-boggling". A review in the Santa Cruz Sentinel described the book as "fascinating" and recommended it to anyone looking into "the psychology of the human race".

A multiple-book review (alongside The Teachings of Don Juan and At Your Own Risk) said the most creative aspect of the book was its comparison between past and future Hubbard, as both sci-fi writer and priest. This review criticized aspects of the book as unsatisfying and confusing in its explanations, describing it as "so objective there is nothing left".

== Scientology response ==
=== Lawsuit by Church of Scientology ===
The Church of Scientology fought to prevent the sale of the book. In the 1970s, the Church of Scientology sued Dell Publishing and George Malko for defamation. The defendants were denied summary judgment when Dell republished the book in paperback form without further investigation, despite receiving a signed statement by a person named in the book denying certain allegations pertaining to him. Dell later paid a legal settlement and did not release the book again in a printed format.

=== Attempt by Church of Scientology to ban book ===
In 1974, the Church of Scientology of Canada attempted to have the book banned in libraries in Canada on the grounds that they were defamatory. In June 1974, libraries were advised that if they did not remove four books from their shelves — Scientology: The Now Religion (Malko), Inside Scientology (Kaufman), The Scandal of Scientology (Cooper), and The Mind Benders (Vosper) — they would be named in a lawsuit. Two library boards in Ontario, Canada had been served with writs.

After obtaining out-of-court settlements of $7,500 and $500 (USD) and apologies from the publishers of two of the works (Dell Publishing and Tower Publications), the Church of Scientology further threatened to sue any library or bookstore that carried the books. After certain libraries in Canada refused to remove the books from their shelves, they were sued by the Church. One Canadian library reported the theft of a book critical of Scientology from its shelves. These incidents were later reported in a chronological timeline of censorship in British Columbia.

According to used book-sellers, people associated with Scientology have attempted to get copies of the book removed from online marketplaces claiming undefined trademark infringements. They have been instructed to remove their listings of this title by online selling sites after having received reports of "trademark infringement from the rights owner," even though the copies in question have been in circulation for nearly 50 years. The claims of infringement originate from an L.A. publisher of L. Ron Hubbard's Dianetics and Scientology Materials, suggesting that the charge is an attempt to censure the content.

== See also ==
- Bibliography of books critical of Scientology
- Scientology and law
