= The Church of Scientology: A History of a New Religion =

2011 book by Hugh Urban

- First edition
- Author: Hugh B. Urban
- Language: English
- Subject: Church of Scientology
- Publisher: Princeton University Press
- Publication date: 2011
- Publication place: United States
- Media type: Print (Hardcover)
- Pages: 268
- ISBN: 978-0-691-14608-9

The Church of Scientology: A History of a New Religion is a 2011 book about the history of the Church of Scientology by Hugh Urban, a professor of religious studies in the Department of Comparative Studies at Ohio State University. Urban discusses the history and teachings of the group and how they relate to broader trends in American society. Urban also writes about whether the group is a religion, and how religion is defined. In The Chronicle of Higher Education, Seth Perry states that Urban "is more concerned with the questions Scientology raises than about Scientology itself".

Eileen Barker applauds Urban's discussion of how the Cold War affected Scientology's development and praises his avoidance of academic jargon. She notes that there is little about Scientology outside the United States. Writing in The Guardian, Alex Preston faults Urban for what he sees as "arid prose and [a] timid approach", but applauds him for a "deep and often brilliant anthropological dissection" of the Church of Scientology. Joe Humphreys writes in The Irish Times that he believes that Urban is "determined to give Hubbard's disciples a fair hearing", but feels that he "stretches credulity at times". He notes, however, that the book "generates interesting questions about double standards in our treatment of religions".

== See also ==
- Bibliography of books critical of Scientology
