= Inside Scientology: The Story of America's Most Secretive Religion =

2011 book by Janet Reitman

- Author: Janet Reitman
- Language: English
- Subject: Church of Scientology
- Publisher: Houghton Mifflin
- Publication date: 2011
- Publication place: United States
- Media type: Print (hardcover)
- Pages: 444
- ISBN: 978-0-618-88302-8

Inside Scientology: The Story of America's Most Secretive Religion is a 2011 book by journalist Janet Reitman in which the author examines the Church of Scientology. Reitman, a contributing editor for Rolling Stone, began studying the church in 2005. She published an article in Rolling Stone about Scientology the next year and continued her research for five years culminating in her 2011 book.

== Content ==
The book covers the history of Scientology and discusses prominent Scientologists such as L. Ron Hubbard and Tom Cruise. It details the church's business model under the leadership of David Miscavige. It also describes Scientology controversies, such as the death of Lisa McPherson. The book devotes some attention to Scientology's broader teachings.

The Chicago Tribune wrote that the book "mostly delivers on Reitman's promise of an 'objective modern history' of the church, ... and offers up the insights of members from the church's past and present, giving the material a fresh feel and sense of fairness. She balances high-ranking defectors' eyewitness accounts of abuse with the observations of practicing Scientologists who come across as believers but not robots — and ask some pretty good questions of their own."

== Reception ==
In 2011, Doug Fabrizio of RadioWest interviewed Reitman about her new book and her process and experiences while researching for her book. In the broadcast, Reitman said that the Church of Scientology gave her 18 hours of access to top Scientology officials to answer her questions for the 2006 Rolling Stone article and were frequently communicating with Rolling Stone trying to get some control over the article. After the article, Reitman spent five years interviewing hundreds of former and current Scientologists and doing further research before publishing her book. RadioWest rebroadcast the interview two more times.

In a review for The Washington Post, Diane Winston wrote: "the facts Reitman reveals about Scientology are damning. Even if the tradition's basic practices have helped some people to live fuller lives, the institution itself seems irredeemably corrupt. Inside Scientology is a masterful piece of reporting. Reitman, a freelance journalist, supplements Scientologists' memoirs, founder L. Ron Hubbard's extensive writings, news reports and declassified online documents with dozens of interviews of former and current church members."

According to a review published in The Village Voice, Reitman's book is a "stunning overview of everything" and calls the author a "thorough, brave journalist," who has "done such a good job with original research and interviewing eyewitnesses from every era of the organization's development that she can weave a page-turning narrative no matter how arcane the material."

The Seattle Times wrote, "Reitman's analysis of Scientology's ability to survive scandal and mockery is compelling and persuasive. She describes Scientology as a "shape-shifting" organization, attuned to changes in the national mood, able to be whatever people in a given time most want: a religion, a UFO story, a countercultural movement or a self-help program."

== See also ==
- Bibliography of books critical of Scientology
- Scientology controversies
