= The Scandal of Scientology =

Book by Paulette Cooper

- Cover
- Author: Paulette Cooper
- Language: English
- Subject: Scientology
- Publisher: Tower Publications
- Publication date: 1971
- Publication place: United States
- Media type: Print (Paperback)
- Pages: 220

The Scandal of Scientology is a critical exposé book about the Church of Scientology, written by Paulette Cooper and published by Tower Publications, in 1971.

In 2007, Cooper wrote about the events resulting from the publication of her story "The Tragi-farce of Scientology" in a 1969 issue of Queen magazine. In the article "The Scandal of the Scandal of Scientology," in Byline, Cooper commented on her motivation for writing the book: "I had a master's degree in psychology and had studied comparative religion at Harvard for a summer and what I learned during my research about the group founded by L. Ron Hubbard was both fascinating and frightening. The story cried out to be told."

About 50,000 copies of the book were printed.

== Operation Freakout ==
The book earned Cooper negative attention from members of the Church, (Note: Use of "Church" or "the Church" is a common shortened form of "Church of Scientology"; see The Church (Scientology).) and she was subsequently the target not only of litigation but a harassment campaign known as Operation Freakout, the goal of which was to deter Cooper from criticism of Scientology by having her "incarcerated in a mental institution or jail or at least to hit her so hard that she drops her attacks". Members of the Church sent itself forged bomb threats, purportedly from Cooper, using her typewriter and paper with her fingerprints on it; further plans included bomb threats to be sent to Henry Kissinger. The Church's campaign was discovered when the FBI raided Scientology offices in 1977 and recovered documents relating to the operation.

In June 2007, Paulette Cooper wrote about her experience with the Church of Scientology and Operation Freakout from "beginning to end" for the first time. Another account of Cooper's testimony can be found in Bent Corydon's L. Ron Hubbard: Messiah or Madman? in part 1, chapter 14: "Freaking Out Paulette: A Six Year Operation to Drive a Journalist Insane."

== Attempts to remove book from libraries ==
=== Canada ===
The Church of Scientology of Canada attempted to suppress the book in libraries in Canada. In June 1974, libraries were advised that if they do not remove the books Scientology: The Now Religion, Inside Scientology, The Scandal of Scientology and The Mind Benders from their shelves, they would be named in a lawsuit. Two different library boards in Ontario, Canada, had been served with writs.

After obtaining out-of-court settlements of US$7,500 and US$500 and apologies from the publishers of two of the works (Dell Publishing and Tower Publications), Scientology further threatened to sue any library or bookstore that carried them. After certain libraries in Canada refused to remove the books from their shelves, they were sued by Scientology. One Canadian library reported the theft of a book critical of Scientology from its shelves.

These incidents were later reported in a chronological timeline of censorship in British Columbia.

=== United States ===
According to Tony Ortega's 2015 biography of Paulette Cooper, The Unbreakable Miss Lovely, libraries in the United States also experienced thefts of the book. Cooper herself learned from the New York Public Library on Fifth Avenue that all 50 copies stocked there had been stolen within hours. One Los Angeles library, frustrated by theft attempts, kept the book locked away, and patrons could read it only under supervision.

== Reception, use in other works ==
The Los Angeles Times described Cooper's work as a "scathing" look at Scientology. The Charleston Gazette called the book: "a fascinating, 220-page paperback exposé."

The book was used as a reference in Jon Atack's later work, A Piece of Blue Sky. Atack wrote: "I happened upon the hard-to-find Scandal of Scientology by Paulette Cooper. Now I was fascinated, and started collecting everything I could get my eager hands on — magazine articles, newspaper clippings, government files, anything." Later, when A Piece of Blue Sky was dropped from Amazon.com listings in a controversial move, this was compared to court actions that initially limited distribution of The Scandal of Scientology.

J. Gordon Melton recommended reading both Cooper's book and the Church's refutation, False Report Correction/The Scandal of Scientology by Paulette Cooper, for "insight" into the Scientology controversy in his 1978 work, The Encyclopedia of American Religions.

== See also ==
- Bibliography of books critical of Scientology
- Scientology controversies
- Ronald DeWolf
