= Cyril Vosper =

British author and anti-cult spokesperson (1935–2004)

- Born: 7 June 1935 Hounslow, Middlesex, UK
- Died: 4 May 2004 (aged 68) Melbourne, Australia
- Occupation: Author, exit counselor
- Notable works: The Mind Benders

Cyril Ronald Vosper (7 June 1935 – 4 May 2004) was an anti-cult leader, former Scientologist and later a critic of Scientology, deprogrammer, and spokesperson on men's health. He wrote The Mind Benders, which was the first book on Scientology to be written by an ex-member, and the first critical book on Scientology to be published (narrowly beating Inside Scientology by Robert Kaufman).

== Biography ==
Vosper was born in 1935 in Hounslow, Middlesex (now part of Greater London) and lived his early life in Britain. He joined the Hubbard Association of Scientologists International (the overseas arm of the Church of Scientology) in 1954 at 19. He soon became a Scientology auditor. In 1956, he was personally cited by L. Ron Hubbard for his "test work and the wonderful results [he has] obtained on pcs [preclears] processed under various directives." Vosper joined Hubbard's staff at Saint Hill Manor in the 1960s, working as the Dissemination Secretary, World Wide and Dissemination Secretary, Evening and Weekend Foundation. He was expelled in September 1968 for alleged disciplinary offences.

In 1971, Vosper published The Mind Benders, a highly critical account of Scientology. The book contained a significant amount of inside information about Scientology including quotations from a number of Hubbard's works. The Church of Scientology sued for breach of copyright and breach of confidence, but its case was rejected by the courts. At one stage in the litigation, a High Court judge was reported as saying of applications by the Church that Vosper and a newspaper editor be committed to prison for contempt of court, that these actions were deliberately taken "to try to stifle any criticism or inquiry into their [the Church of Scientology's] affairs". The Church was permitted to appeal the case but the Court of Appeal rejected the Church's appeal, finding "fair dealing in The Mind Benders in criticising scientology and that it was in the public interest to investigate and disclose."

Following the outcome of the case, Vosper asserted that he had been subjected to "dirty tricks" carried out by the Church. According to him, a copy of his manuscript disappeared from his lodgings and, while on holiday in Spain, he was questioned by the police when they opened a parcel addressed to the place in which he was staying, containing obscene caricatures of the Spanish dictator General Franco.

Vosper subsequently became a deprogrammer, working to extract individuals from groups he considered to be cults. In November 1987, while a committee member of the British anti-cult group Family, Action, Information, Rescue (FAIR), he was convicted in Munich on charges of false imprisonment and causing bodily harm to German Scientologist Barbara Schwarz in the course of a deprogramming attempt. He received a five-month suspended sentence.
