= Geir Hafredahl =

Norwegian politician (born 1962)

Geir Hafredahl (born 23 May 1962) is a Norwegian politician for the Labour Party.

He served as a deputy representative to the Norwegian Parliament from Telemark during the term 1989–1993. During the period he served 22 days as a representative in the parliament.
