= Leah Remini =

American actress (born 1970)

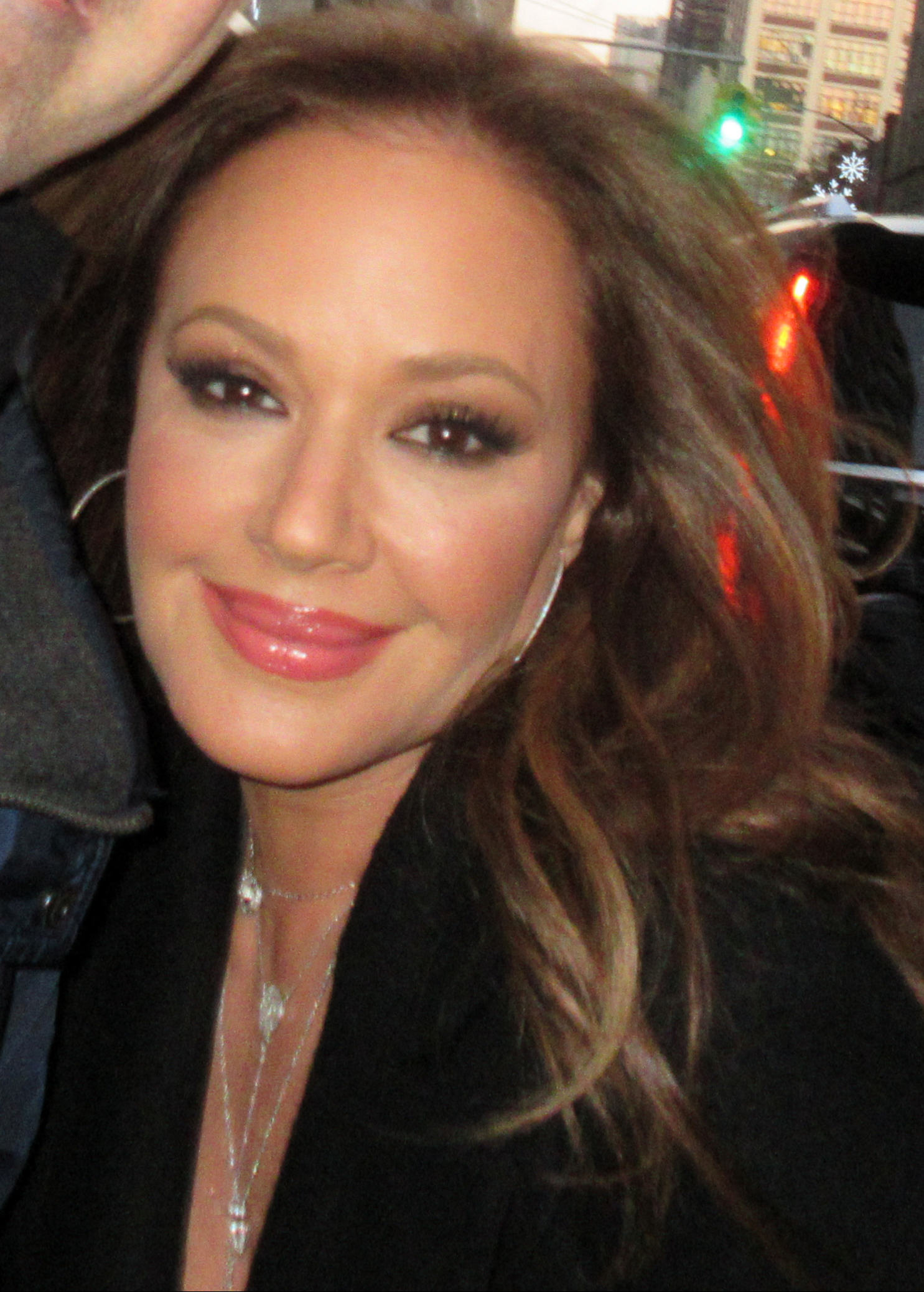
- Remini in 2018
- Born: Leah Marie Remini; June 15, 1970 (age 56); New York City, U.S.
- Education: New York University (AA, BA)
- Occupations: Actress; activist
- Years active: 1988–present
- Spouse: Angelo Pagán (m. 2003; div. 2024)
- Children: 1

YouTube information
- Channel: Leah Remini
- Genre: Video podcast
- Subscribers: 225 thousand
- Views: 60 million
- Last updated: October 22, 2025
- Website: leahremini.com

Leah Marie Remini (/ˈrɛmɪni/; born June 15, 1970) is an American actress. She starred as Carrie Heffernan on the CBS sitcom The King of Queens (1998–2007) and as Vanessa Celluci in the CBS sitcom Kevin Can Wait (2017–2018), both alongside Kevin James.

After being a member of the Church of Scientology from childhood, Remini left the organization in 2013. Two years later, Remini released her book, Troublemaker: Surviving Hollywood and Scientology; the memoir became number one on the New York Times Best Seller list. From 2016 to 2019, Remini coproduced and hosted the A&E documentary series Leah Remini: Scientology and the Aftermath, for which she won two Primetime Emmy Awards for Outstanding Hosted Nonfiction Series or Special. Since July 2020, Remini has been the cohost of the podcast Scientology: Fair Game, alongside Mike Rinder. She also cohosted the daytime talk show The Talk (2010–2011) and hosted the game show People Puzzler (2021–2023). Remini's films include the comedy Old School (2003), the mystery comedy Handsome (2017), and the romantic comedy Second Act (2018).

== Early life ==
Remini was born on June 15, 1970, in Brooklyn, New York City, to Vicki Marshall and George Remini, who owned an asbestos removal company. Her mother is of Austrian Jewish descent, while her father has Italian ancestry, rooted in Sicily. Remini was raised in Bensonhurst.

Remini was baptized into the Catholic Church as an infant and raised in the faith during her early childhood. When she was 8, her mother joined the Church of Scientology, and Remini was thereafter raised as a Scientologist. At 13, Remini and her sister were taken to join Scientology's Paramilitary organization called the Sea Organization, where they were forced to sign billion-year contracts and work for their room and board.

Remini's mother decided to take her children out of the Sea Org and return to civilian Scientology life within the same year. Remini moved to Los Angeles, with her mother and sisters, where she spent the remainder of her teenage years working to pay off their debt to Scientology for all of their auditing received. In addition, Remini and her family worked regular jobs to pay for continuing Scientology courses and services.

== Career ==
=== Film and television ===
One of Remini's early television roles was on Who's the Boss? as Charlie Briscoe, which led to a spin-off series entitled Living Dolls, in which Remini starred with Halle Berry. The show premiered in late 1989 and ran for twelve episodes. In 1991, Remini had a supporting role as Tina Bovasso on ABC's sitcom The Man in the Family. She then had recurring roles on Saved by the Bell playing Stacey Carosi, and on Evening Shade as Taylor Newton's (Jay R. Ferguson) girlfriend, Daisy. Remini then appeared in two more short-lived series, First Time Out (1995) and Fired Up (1997–98).

In 1991 and 1993, she appeared on Cheers as Serafina, the daughter of Carla and Nick Tortelli (Rhea Perlman and Dan Hedaya). In 1994, Remini auditioned for the role of Monica Geller on Friends, but the role went to Courteney Cox. Remini later appeared in the 1995 Friends episode "The One with the Birth" in which she played a pregnant woman, Lydia, whose delivery is aided by Joey Tribbiani. In 1998, Remini landed the role of Carrie Heffernan on the CBS sitcom The King of Queens. The series was successful, and ran for nine seasons from September 21, 1998, to May 14, 2007. During her time on the show, she starred in Quaker State's television commercials in 2000 and 2001. During this time she also co-starred in the Lorenzo Doumani film Follow Your Heart, which was filmed in 1996 but not released until 1998. She also worked in radio, with the Don and Mike Show.

Remini had a supporting role in the comedy film Old School (2003). She also starred in her own reality show, Inside Out: Leah Remini, which was a documentary that aired on VH1 about Remini's wedding. Following the success of the wedding special, VH1 documented the next phase of their lives with the birth of her daughter Sofia Bella. Remini has starred in nine-episode webisodes of In the Motherhood, along with Chelsea Handler and Jenny McCarthy, and made two guest appearances on Handler's talk show Chelsea Lately. On December 15, 2009, Remini appeared as Heffernan on Lopez Tonight with George Lopez in an episode reuniting the cast of the George Lopez sitcom. Remini and Holly Robinson Peete appeared on The Young and the Restless on July 28, 2011.

In October 2011, Remini signed a talent development deal at ABC and ABC Studios that required the network and the studio to develop a comedy project for Remini to star in and produce. Remini competed on season 17 of Dancing with the Stars, in which she was partnered with professional dancer Tony Dovolani. The couple made it to the tenth week of competition and reached fifth place. Remini later returned in season 19 as a guest co-host on week six. She returned as guest co-host on season 21 during weeks six and seven. In 2013, Remini joined the cast of the TV Land comedy The Exes, filling a recurring role starting in season 3. Remini created, produced and starred in a reality television series titled Leah Remini: It's All Relative. The show focuses on Remini's family life and it premiered on TLC on July 10, 2014.

In early 2017, Remini returned to acting and was announced as one of the leads in NBC's sitcom What About Barb?, a gender-swapped version of the 1991 Frank Oz comedy What About Bob?. She portrayed Suzanne, a renowned psychotherapist and best-selling author. Ultimately, NBC passed on the project and it wasn't picked up to series. In March 2017, it was announced Remini would reunite with Kevin James on the season finale of Kevin Can Wait. In June 2017, it was announced Remini was upped to a series regular beginning with season 2. In May 2018, the series was cancelled by the network after two seasons. In 2017, Remini co-starred in the comedy films Mad Families, The Clapper, and Handsome. In 2018, she starred as Joan, opposite Jennifer Lopez, in the romantic comedy film Second Act. In June 2022, Remini was named a judge on the seventeenth season of Fox's dance competition series So You Think You Can Dance, replacing Matthew Morrison. Remini began 2021 as the host of the Game Show Network original series People Puzzler.

In August 2026, it was announced that Remini would be joining the cast of The Real Housewives of Beverly Hills, for the sixteenth season.

==== The Talk ====
Remini was a co-host in the first season of the CBS daytime talk show, The Talk, which premiered October 18, 2010. The other co-hosts were Julie Chen, Sara Gilbert, Holly Robinson Peete, and Sharon Osbourne. The show, similar to The View, seeks to address motherhood and contemporary issues. In March 2012, a heavily publicized Twitter dispute ignited between Remini and Osbourne when Remini fired back at Osbourne for making criticisms of Remini and Peete on The Howard Stern Show in relation to their contracts not being renewed for The Talk. In response to questions from her Twitter followers, Remini tweeted:

Ask Sharon. She had us fired ... Sharon thought me and Holly were too 'Ghetto'. (her words) we were not funny, awkward and didn't know ourselves. Haters Gon' Hate. True. But, Haters have the balls to say they 'Hate' ... not call themselves your friend. She had us fired all the while calling me and Holly her friend. Heartbreaking. Yes. She had us fired she told Howard Stern. Explains why she never called us back.

In response, Osbourne tweeted, "I had absolutely nothing to do with her departure from the show and have no idea why she continues to take to Twitter to spread this false gossip." Remini tweeted a challenge to Osbourne to establish in a court of law what statements Remini had made that were untrue.

Friction in relation to these matters resurfaced in the media in early 2021 when Osbourne was embroiled in a scandal over her remarks made on The Talk to Sheryl Underwood and ultimately terminated from the program over them. Both Peete and Remini took to social media to reproach Osbourne over her conduct in relation to the scandal, pointing out that they had been treated similarly by her, charging Osbourne with additional discriminatory behaviors as well. Osbourne responded with threats of defamation lawsuits against Peete and Remini, but ultimately did nothing.

==== Leah Remini: Scientology and the Aftermath ====
Remini developed a series for A&E focusing on ex-Scientologists speaking about their experiences, entitled Leah Remini: Scientology and the Aftermath. The show premiered November 29, 2016. In a statement released by the network, Remini said:

For too long, this multi-billion-dollar organization bullied victims and journalists to prevent the truth from being told. It is my hope that we shed light on information that makes the world aware of what is really going on and encourages others to speak up so the abuses can be ended forever.

The documentary series received many awards in its three seasons: two Emmys, Reality Television Awards 2017 for hosting, 2018 NATPE Unscripted Breakthrough Awards for Best Innovation, 2019 Truth to Power Award, CHILD USA 2019 Barbara Blaine Trailblazer Award, and two Gracie Awards presented by the Alliance for Women in Media Foundation (for On-Air Talent – Lifestyle and Entertainment and for Non-Fiction Entertainment).

=== Memoir ===
Remini released her memoir, entitled Troublemaker: Surviving Hollywood and Scientology, on November 3, 2015. The book received favorable reviews, and became a bestseller shortly after its release, reaching the number one spot on The New York Times Best Seller list.

== Personal life ==
=== Scientology ===
Remini was a member of the Church of Scientology from the age of 9. In July 2013, Remini left Scientology, owing to policies that forbid members from questioning the management of Church leader David Miscavige, whom she believed was corrupt; the reported abuse of members of its Sea Org religious order; its policy of "disconnection"; and its practice of branding those who have left the Church of their own accord as "suppressive persons" and the fair gaming tactics that Scientology has used for decades.

According to former high-ranking Sea Org member Mike Rinder, Remini's problems with Scientology began when she asked about the whereabouts of Miscavige's wife Shelly at the 2006 wedding of Tom Cruise and Katie Holmes, and was told by then-spokesman Tommy Davis that she did not "have the fucking rank" to do so. Remini then filed a "knowledge report" in which she asserted that Miscavige, Cruise, and other senior Scientology members engaged in behavior that was inconsistent with Church rules. She was subsequently "subjected to years of 'interrogations' and 'thought modification'" that led to her being blackballed within Scientology. Fellow parishioners with whom Remini had been friends for decades wrote internal reports about her, resulting in a Church investigation into her family.

During a September 9, 2013, appearance on The Ellen DeGeneres Show, Remini discussed her departure from Scientology and the loss of friends who are still in the Church who, according to Remini, are not permitted to have contact with her. Following her departure from Scientology, she publicly expressed her appreciation for those who supported her departure. Remini's sister Nicole, who had earlier left Scientology, revealed that the rest of their family left the Church along with Remini to avoid being split up by the disconnection policy. Writer and director Paul Haggis, who had previously been the most famous person to publicly disavow Scientology, wrote an open letter, published by The Hollywood Reporter, thanking Remini for standing by him after he left Scientology and praised her "enormous amount of integrity and compassion".

In August 2013, it was disclosed that Remini had filed a missing person report with the Los Angeles Police Department (LAPD) concerning Shelly Miscavige, the wife of Scientology leader David Miscavige, who has not been seen in public since 2007. After the report was filed, the LAPD looked into the matter, met and spoke with Shelly Miscavige before closing the investigation, and stated Remini's report was "unfounded". Scientology said in a statement that the whole affair was simply harassment and a publicity stunt for Remini.

In October 2013, it was reported that Remini had been subpoenaed to testify in a lawsuit in Comal County, Texas, against Scientology and David Miscavige, regarding acts of alleged harassment and surveillance against Monique Rathbun, who was married to ex-Scientology executive Mark Rathbun. Monique Rathbun's attorney, Ray Jeffery, said he wanted Remini to give a deposition in the hopes she could testify that Miscavige has vast influence over the operations of the Church and had to have known about the alleged harassment. In 2023, Remini sued the Church of Scientology and David Miscavige, accusing them of harassment, stalking, psychological torture, and operating an over ten-year campaign to ruin and destroy Remini's life and livelihood.

=== Catholicism ===
In a 2015 interview with People, Remini talked about her embrace of Catholicism, the comfort she was finding in the religion's practices, and how this contrasted with her experience of Scientology.

=== Family ===
Remini met actor Angelo Pagán at a Cuban restaurant in 1996. Pagán has three sons from previous relationships. He and Remini were married in Las Vegas by a Scientologist minister on July 19, 2003. Their daughter Sofia was born on June 16, 2004. In September 2015, when Sofia was eleven years old, her parents celebrated her baptism into the Catholic Church. On August 29, 2024, Remini announced via Instagram that she and Pagán had decided to divorce. They finalized their divorce on October 11, 2024.

=== Education ===
Remini had left school with just an 8th-grade education, which she attributes to her involvement with Scientology. In May 2021, Remini was accepted into an associate degree program in liberal arts at New York University, saying:

For someone like me, a person who desperately wanted a higher education and options in my life, coming from a cult and a family who didn't value an education, this is a very big day for me. This didn't come easy. This is one of the last chunks of my life that I am taking back for myself from Scientology.

In 2023, after completing her second year at NYU, Remini expressed how "undertaking this educational journey has been one of the most difficult experiences of my life." She was awarded an Associate in Arts degree from NYU in January 2024 and she began working toward a bachelor's degree. In 2026, she announced on Instagram that she graduated summa cum laude with a Bachelor of Arts degree in sociology, with a concentration in psychology.

== Filmography ==
=== Film ===
Year	Film	Role
1997	Critics and Other Freaks	Actress at Audition
1999	Follow Your Heart	Angie LaRocca
2003	Old School	Lara Campbell
2017	Mad Families	Cheyenne
2017	The Clapper	Producer Louise
2017	Handsome	Esta
2018	Second Act	Joan
2025	The Mother, the Menacer, and Me	Karen Brazo Fuerte
2025	Flight Risk	Van Sant

=== Television ===
Year	Title	Role	Notes
1988	Head of the Class	Unknown	Episode: "Let's Rap"
1989	Who's the Boss?	Charlie Briscoe	2 episodes
1989	Living Dolls	Charlie Briscoe	Main role (12 episodes)
1990	Normal Life	Carol	Episode: "And Baby Makes ..."
1991	Paradise	Rose	Episode: "Out of the Ashes"
1991	The Hogan Family	Joanne	Episode: "A Sneaking Suspicion"
1991	The Man in the Family	Tina Bavasso	Main role (7 episodes)
1991	Saved by the Bell	Stacey Carosi	6 episodes
1991–1993	Cheers	Serafina Tortelli	2 episodes
1992	Blossom	Ellen Travers	Episode: "You Must Remember This"
1992	Getting Up and Going Home	Stephanie O'Neil	Television film
1993	Evening Shade	Daisy	3 episodes
1993	Harlan & Merleen	Frankie	Television pilot
1994	The Commish	Gail Ross	Episode: "Sergeant Kelly"
1994	Renegade	Tina	Episode: "The King and I"
1994–1996	Phantom 2040	Sagan Cruz	Voice, main role (22 episodes)
1995	Diagnosis: Murder	Agnes Benedetto	Episode: "How to Murder Your Lawyer"
1995	Friends	Lydia	Episode: "The One with the Birth"
1995	First Time Out	Dominique Costellano	Main role (12 episodes)
1996	Biker Mice from Mars	Carbine	Voice, 2 episodes
1996	Home Improvement	Maria Gomez	Episode: "The Bud Bowl"
1996	NYPD Blue	Angela Bohi	Episode: "Closing Time"
1997–1998	Fired Up	Terry Reynolds	Main role (28 episodes)
1998–2007	The King of Queens	Carrie Heffernan	Main role (207 episodes)
1999	Hooves of Fire	Vixen	Voice, television film; American dub
2002	Legend of the Lost Tribe	Koala	Voice, television film; American dub
2003	VH1 Inside Out: Leah Remini's Wedding Special	Herself	Television documentary
2004	VH1 Inside Out: Leah Remini's Baby Special	Herself	Television documentary
2005	Fat Actress	Herself	Episode: "The Koi Effect"
2007–2008	In the Motherhood	Kim	8 episodes
2009	Lopez Tonight	Carrie Heffernan	Episode: "December 15, 2009"
2009	Married Not Dead	Jessica	Television pilot
2009	It Takes a Village	Karen	Television pilot
2010–2011	The Talk	Herself / co-host	135 episodes
2011	Toddlers and Tiaras: Where Are They Now?	Juana	Television short
2012	The High Fructose Adventures of Annoying Orange	Polly Prune / Butch Ravioli	Voice, 2 episodes
2013	Family Tools	Terry Baumgardner	Main role (10 episodes)
2013–2014	Phineas and Ferb	Doreen / Mean Woman	2 episodes
2013–2015; 2019, 2022	Dancing with the Stars	Herself	Contestant (season 17); Guest co-host (season 19, week 6; season 21, weeks 6–7); Guest judge (season 28, week 4)
2014–2022	The Wendy Williams Show	Herself	Guest and guest host; 25 episodes
2014	RuPaul's Drag Race	Herself / Guest Judge	Episode: "Glamazon by Colorevolution"
2014	Hollywood Game Night	Herself	Episode: "A Hollywood Scandal"
2014–2015	The Exes	Nikki Gardner	15 episodes
2014–2015	Leah Remini: It's All Relative	Herself	26 episodes; also executive producer
2015	Repeat After Me	Herself	Episode: 1.5
2016–2018	Match Game	Herself / Panelist	4 episodes
2016–2019	Leah Remini: Scientology and the Aftermath	Herself	37 episodes; also executive producer
2017	Milo Murphy's Law	Ms. Baxter	Voice, episode: "The Substitute/Time Out"
2017	What About Barb?	Dr. Suzanne Marvin	Television pilot
2017–2018	Kevin Can Wait	Vanessa Cellucci	26 episodes
2018	Mean Jean	Jean	Television pilot
2020	The Masked Singer	Guest panelist	Episode: "Masking for a Friend: Group A"
2021–2023	People Puzzler	Host	115 episodes; also as executive producer in episode "Singin' in the Game"
2022	So You Think You Can Dance	Judge	Season 17; 9 episodes

=== Video games ===
Year	Title	Voice role
1993	Gabriel Knight: Sins of the Fathers	Grace Nakimura

== Bibliography ==
- Remini, Leah (2015). Troublemaker: Surviving Hollywood and Scientology. Ballantine Books. ISBN 978-1101886960.

== Awards and nominations ==
Year	Association	Category	Work	Result	Ref.
2015	American Reality Television Awards	Reality Royalty	Leah Remini: It's All Relative	Won	
2017	Television Critics Association Awards	Outstanding Achievement in Reality Programming	Leah Remini: Scientology and the Aftermath	Won	
2017	69th Primetime Emmy Awards	Outstanding Informational Series or Special	Leah Remini: Scientology and the Aftermath	Won	
2018	NATPE Unscripted Breakthrough Awards	Best Innovation	Leah Remini: Scientology and the Aftermath	Won	
2018	29th Producers Guild of America Awards	Outstanding Producer of Non-Fiction Television	Leah Remini: Scientology and the Aftermath	Won	
2018	70th Primetime Emmy Awards	Outstanding Informational Series or Special	Leah Remini: Scientology and the Aftermath	Nominated	
2018	American Reality Television Awards	Host	Leah Remini: Scientology and the Aftermath	Won	
2019	CHILD USA	Barbara Blaine Trailblazer Award	Leah Remini: Scientology and the Aftermath	Won	
2019	30th Producers Guild of America Awards	Outstanding Producer of Non-Fiction Television	Leah Remini: Scientology and the Aftermath	Nominated	
2019	IDA Documentary Awards	Truth to Power Award	Leah Remini: Scientology and the Aftermath	Won	
2019	Critics Choice Television Awards	Impact Award	Leah Remini: Scientology and the Aftermath	Won	
2019	Gracie Awards	On-Air Talent – Lifestyle and Entertainment Award	Leah Remini: Scientology and the Aftermath	Won	
2019	Gracie Awards	Non-Fiction Entertainment	Leah Remini: Scientology and the Aftermath	Won	
2019	71st Primetime Emmy Awards	Outstanding Informational Series or Special	Leah Remini: Scientology and the Aftermath	Nominated	
2020	72nd Primetime Emmy Awards	Outstanding Hosted Nonfiction Series or Special	Leah Remini: Scientology and the Aftermath	Won	

Media offices
First	The Talk co-host 2010–2011	Succeeded by Sheryl Underwood
