= Inside Scientology: How I Joined Scientology and Became Superhuman =

Critic book by Robert Kaufman, 1972

Inside Scientology
- Book cover, 1972 ed.
- Author: Robert Kaufman
- Language: English
- Subject: Church of Scientology
- Genre: Non-fiction
- Publisher: Olympia Press
- Publication date: June 1972
- Media type: Print (Hardcover)
- Pages: 279
- ISBN: 978-0-7004-0110-9
- OCLC: 533305
- Followed by: Inside Scientology/Dianetics (revised ed. 1995)

Inside Scientology: How I Joined Scientology and Became Superhuman is a 1972 book by Robert Kaufman, in which the author takes a critical look at the Church of Scientology. It was first published in 1972 by Olympia Press. The book was the first to disclose secret Scientology materials. It was also published in 1972 in German, and was the first extensive critical report on Scientology in German.

The book has subsequently been revised in a 1995 edition, titled: Inside Scientology/Dianetics. After revising the text of the work, Kaufman gave a copy of the work to a friend to edit and release for distribution on the internet, in 1995. Kaufman died on July 29, 1996.

A full-text online version of the 1995 revised edition by Kaufman is freely available on the internet.

== Reviews ==
Other prominent critical writers on related topics gave the book high marks, including Jon Atack, author of the book A Piece of Blue Sky.

Critical writings about the Church of Scientology by William S. Burroughs, as well as his review of Inside Scientology, led to a battle of letters between Burroughs and Scientology supporters that played out in the pages of Rolling Stone.

The third text of Burroughs' book, Ali's Smile/Naked Scientology, is a reprint of a review by Burroughs of Inside Scientology, from the November 9, 1972, issue of Rolling Stone. This is followed by a letter from a Church of Scientology representative in reaction to the review of Kaufman's book, and then Burroughs' reply to that.

== Conflict with Scientology ==
In the foreword to the 1995 edition of his work, Kaufman described several incidents of litigation and harassment by the Church of Scientology. A man named James Meisler, who described himself as a "Reverend in the Church of Scientology", demanded to see a copy of Kaufman's as yet unpublished manuscript. When Kaufman refused, Meisler stated: "It's your neck..We've got you covered on all fronts."

A man calling himself "Larry Tepper" befriended Kaufman, claiming to be a compatriot debating whether to leave Scientology. He wanted to know if Kaufman had any writings about the organization, and Kaufman gave him the first 100 pages of his work. A few days later, a photocopy of the section Kaufman had given Tepper arrived at Olympia Press, from Scientology's Los Angeles headquarters, with marked proposed corrections.

Shortly after this incident, Kaufman's publisher called him to tell him that proofs of the sections that he had not given to Tepper were stolen from the publisher's printer in Connecticut. According to Kaufman's publisher, a man came "to the plant late at night, told the watchman that he was an Olympia editor from New York, and got away with the juicy part of the book."

The Church of Scientology attempted to enjoin the publication of Kaufman's work, and filed suits in New York City, Boston and London - however all of these attempts were dismissed prior to the 1972 publication.

In her eulogy of Kaufman on alt.religion.scientology, Paulette Cooper described how Scientologists once found out in advance about a piano recital Kaufman was going to be giving — and called the ticket taker telling him that Kaufman was ill and that the concert was cancelled. Kaufman ended up playing to an almost empty audience. Kaufman also described this incident in the 1995 edition of his book. He wrote that Scientology documents obtained by the FBI through their investigation of Operation Freakout and Operation Snow White included an empty folder labelled "Carnegie Hall Incident."

After the book was published, the head of Olympia Press, Maurice Girodias, was sued by the Church of Scientology, and Kaufman was named as co-defendant. He later counter-sued for damages incurred in Great Britain. Olympia Press endured strange incidents during this time as well. Letters written on Olympia Press stationery were stolen from their London offices, and shortly thereafter Olympia dealers and distributors in Britain received letters stating that the publisher had gone bankrupt — and to send published books back to the warehouses. Britain's Scotland Yard and Home Office received hundreds of letters which complained about Olympia Press' "pornography". Though Olympia Press won back their books in court, the expenses were too great and the company in the end did lose the books.

Also in the foreword to his 1995 edition, Kaufman describes how an agent named "Jerry" from the Scientology Guardian's Office befriended him after he had written Inside Scientology. Kaufman later found a journal in the agent's room, which contained the phrase "Twigs still doesn't know I'm a Scientologist." Later, Kaufman found out that files discovered through the FBI investigation of Operation Freakout and Operation Snow White contained further information on the "Twigs" Guardian's Office investigation of Kaufman — which contained lists of Kaufman's friends going back twenty years.

== Attempt by Scientology to ban the book ==
The Church of Scientology of Canada attempted to ban the book in libraries in Canada. In June 1974, libraries were advised that if they did not remove four books from their shelves—Scientology: The Now Religion, Inside Scientology, The Scandal of Scientology and The Mind Benders—they would be named in a lawsuit. Two different library boards in Ontario, Canada, had been served with writs.

After obtaining out-of-court settlements of $7,500 and $500 USD and apologies from the publishers of two of the works (Dell Publishing and Tower Publications), Scientology further threatened to sue any library or bookstore that carried them. After certain libraries in Canada refused to remove the books from their shelves, they were sued by Scientology. One Canadian library reported the theft of a book critical of Scientology from its shelves.

These incidents were later reported in a chronological timeline of censorship in British Columbia.

== See also ==
- Bibliography of books critical of Scientology
- Scientology controversies
