= Hugh Urban =

American professor of religious studies

Hugh Bayard Urban is a professor of religious studies at Ohio State University's Department of Comparative Studies and author of eight books and several academic articles, including a history of the Church of Scientology. He received his PhD in history of religions from the University of Chicago.

== Early life, education and family ==
Urban is the son of a psychologist and Pennsylvania State University professor and was brought up in a devout Episcopal family. He is married to Nancy Jesser, who also teaches in the Department of Comparative Studies at Ohio State University. They have one child.

== Academic research ==
Urban's academic focus began with the religions of India and expanded to his studies of new religious movements in both the United States and Europe, about which he has written many academic books and articles. He has said that the knowledge and power used by religions to keep information hidden from others had always fascinated him.

In 2012, Urban published The Church of Scientology: A History of a New Religion which received praise from the sceptic Michael Shermer who called it "the most scholarly treatment of the organization to date." Rachel Aviv of the London Review of Books said that it "chronicles the way [Church of Scientology founder L. Ron] Hubbard reacted to legal and political challenges to his authority by attempting (largely successfully) to conceal his theories from the public." Kirkus Reviews called the book "a fascinating and oftentimes mind-bending account of how penny-a-word sci-fi writer L. Ron Hubbard doggedly pursued the religion angle in his quest to create the worldwide Church of Scientology."

== Bibliography ==
- 2001: Songs of Ecstasy: Tantric and Devotional Songs from Bengal. Oxford University Press.
- 2001: The Economics of Ecstasy: Tantra, Secrecy and Power in Colonial Bengal. Oxford University Press.
- 2003: Tantra: Sex, Secrecy, Politics and Power in the Study of Religion. University of California Press.
- 2006: Magia Sexualis: Sex, Magic and Liberation in Modern Western Esotericism. University of California Press.
- 2007: The Secrets of the Kingdom: Religion and Concealment in the Bush Administration. Rowman & Littlefield.
- 2009: The Power of Tantra: Religion, Sexuality and the Politics of South Asian Studies. I.B. Tauris/ Palgrave MacMillan.
- 2011: The Church of Scientology: A History of a New Religion. Princeton University Press.
- 2016: Zorba the Buddha: Sex, spirituality, and capitalism in the global Osho movement. University of California Press.
- 2021: Secrecy: Silence, Power, and Religion, University of Chicago Press.
- 2022: The Routledge Handbook of Religion and Secrecy, Routledge. (editor)
- 2024: The Path of Desire: Living Tantra in Northeast India, University of Chicago Press.
- 2026: Still Seeking the Magic Mushroom: Fungi, Pharmaceuticals, and Mysticism without Religion, University of Chicago Press.

== See also ==
- Scientology and other religions
- Tantra
- Tantric sex
- Sex magic
