= Geir Isene =

Norwegian writer (born 1966)

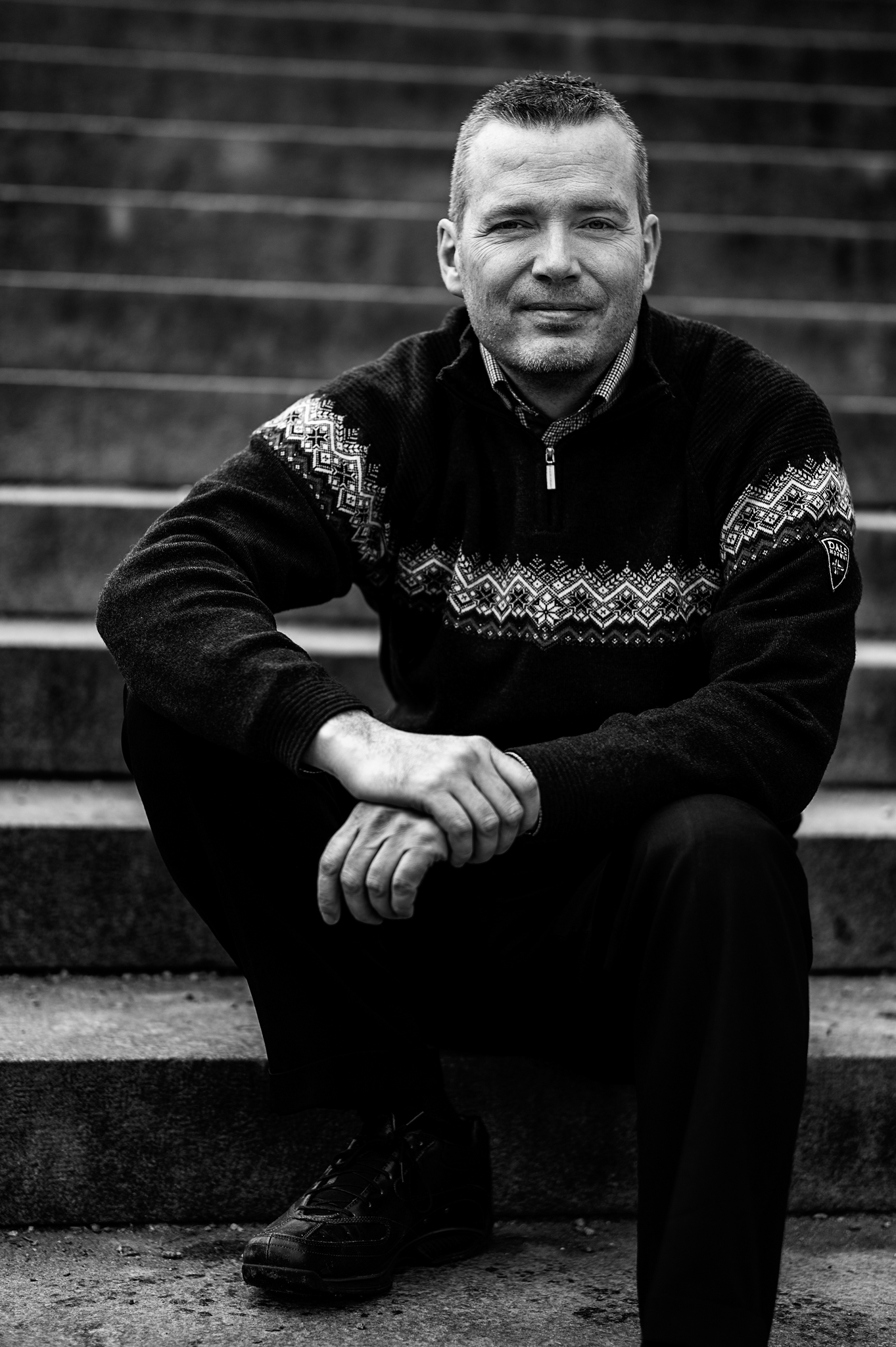
- Isene in 2013
- Pronunciation: EASE-neh
- Born: 1966 (age 59–60); Oslo, Norway
- Citizenship: Norway
- Occupation: Business coach
- Organization: Å
- Notable work: Nineteen Eighty-Four, My Journey Into Scientology's Innermost Secrets - And Out Again
- Spouse: Katrina
- Children: 4
- Website: isene.org; isene.me

Notes
- Fluent in English

Geir Isene (born 1966) is a Norwegian IT consultant, business coach, writer, and critic of the Church of Scientology.

Isene left the Church of Scientology in 2009 after having been a member for 25 years. His turning point came in 2006, shortly after having reached the uppermost spiritual level within the church, OT VIII, when he met the leader, David Miscavige.

He released his autobiography, Nineteen Eighty-Four, My Journey Into Scientology's Innermost Secrets - And Out Again on September 18, 2013, in which he reveals details about the secret OT levels.

Isene is known as an open-source advocate, a public speaker, coach and blogger.

== Scientology ==
Isene joined Scientology in 1984 and left on 7 August 2009 after 25 years. He had become Norway's foremost Scientologist by rising to OT VIII in 2006, the highest level, making him a significant Scientologist internationally. He met Scientology-leader David Miscavige several times and found him arrogant, impetuous, presumptuous and rude.

Isene cited issues with Church of Scientology management as his primary contention, and especially highlighted the high-pressure tactics in mandatory meetings requiring large donations "for nothing". (Note: Scientology founder L. Ron Hubbard repeatedly wrote that Church of Scientology services should require an exchange of money, and railed against the practice of organizational fundraising to obtain money without giving something of value in return.) It took Isene two years of extensive researching and evaluating before deciding to leave, and when he did the Church pressured two of his employees (who were Scientologists) to leave his company, and about 25 Scientologist friends disconnected from him.

Isene was one of three OT VIIIs who left that year. At first he declared he would remain a Scientologist though no longer be affiliated with the Church of Scientology, but just two years later declared he was no longer a Scientologist. Isene is the only person having reached OT VIII who has released a book detailing his journey into and out of Scientology.

== Career ==
Isene is an IT entrepreneur, who previously led several recruiting, consulting and IT companies including U-MAN Norge (WISE-affiliated), Creo Pario AS, and Linpro AS. Isene has been the leader of Abelia, an association for technology and knowledge companies in Norway.

He founded the software company FreeCode AS in 2004, and operated it until 2012, and in 2008 was awarded the Oslo Municipality's Entrepreneur Award for "promoting open innovation and value sharing... and taking social responsibility with its social commitment". FreeCode was "based on open source code, and provided training, consulting, software, development, implementation, operation and support."

In 2012, Isene and Brendan Martin started the business coaching company Å; still in operation as of 2026.

== Autobiography ==
- Isene, Geir (2013). Nittenåttifire, Min vei inn i Scientologiens innerste hemmeligheter - og ut igjen [Nineteen Eighty-Four, My Journey Into Scientology's Innermost Secrets - And Out Again] (in Norwegian Bokmål). Oslo: Humanist Forlag. ISBN 9788282820592. OCLC 1028488518. OL 25430365M.

== See also ==
- Scientology controversies
- Bibliography of books critical of Scientology
