= Paulette Cooper =

American journalist and writer (born 1942)

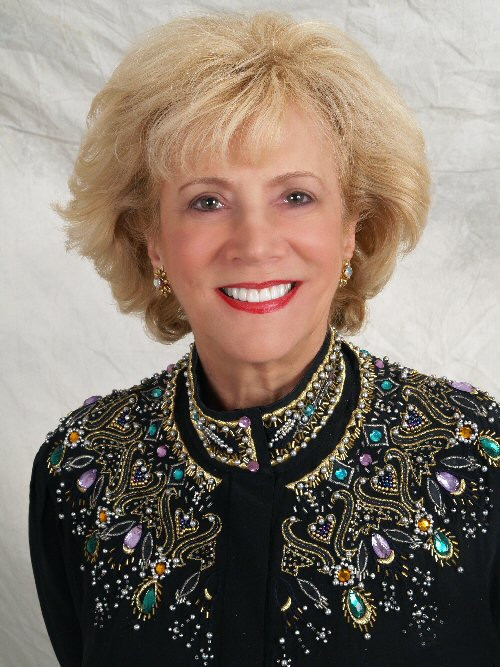
- Cooper
- Born: Paula Bucholc; July 26, 1942 (age 84); Antwerp, Belgium
- Education: Brandeis University; City College of New York
- Occupations: Author and journalist
- Spouse: Paul Noble (m. 1988)
- Writing career
- Genres: Nonfiction
- Notable work: The Scandal of Scientology
- Notable awards: Conscience-in-Media Award
- Website: www.paulettecooper.com

Paulette Cooper (born July 26, 1942) is an American author and journalist whose writing about the Church of Scientology resulted in harassment from Scientologists. An early critic of the church, she published The Scandal of Scientology in 1971. She endured many years of attacks from church leadership and their agents, including lawsuits, smear campaigns, overt and covert surveillance, outright threats, and even a criminal frame-up. Church founder and leader L. Ron Hubbard was reportedly obsessed with her and personally plotted against her. The Church of Scientology instituted a total of nineteen lawsuits against Cooper from all over the world. She countersued them three times before finally settling with the church in 1985.

Cooper has authored or co-authored nearly two dozen books, covering a wide range of topics including travel, missing persons, psychics, and pets, in addition to Scientology. Her books have sold close to half a million copies in total. She has had her articles published by (among others) Cosmopolitan, The Washington Post, and the National Enquirer. She was nominated for an Edgar Award for her 1973 non-fiction book on forensic science. She has also served as a ghostwriter for Margaret Truman, a daughter of President Harry S. Truman.

== Early life ==
Cooper's birth parents were Chaim and Ruchla (née Minkowski) Bucholc, Polish Jews who immigrated to Antwerp, Belgium, in the late 1920s. Paula "Paulette" was born on July 26, 1942, during the Nazi occupation of Belgium. Chaim, a skilled leatherworker, was arrested four days before her birth; Ruchla was arrested that October. Both perished that year at Auschwitz-Birkenau. Family friends kept Paula and her older sister Sarah in hiding for months, but Nazi troops eventually found them. Just before they were to be sent to Auschwitz in the summer of 1943, friends of Chaim's and other benefactors secured their release by bribing Nazi officials.

Paulette and Sarah spent years in various orphanages in Belgium. Sarah (later known as "Suzy") was eventually adopted by an aunt who could not afford to support both sisters. An American Jewish couple, Ted and Stella (née Toepfer) Cooper, arranged for Paulette to come live with them in New York City in 1948. The adoption was formalized in 1950, at which time Paulette was also naturalized.

== Education ==
Following her arrival in the United States, Cooper adopted English quickly, reading voraciously and writing by age 8. She graduated from Brandeis University with a psychology degree in 1964, having also completed a summer course in comparative religion at Harvard. After graduation she returned to Harvard for several months to work on a schizophrenia study. She later earned a master's degree from The City College of New York.

== Early career ==
Early in her career, Cooper distinguished herself in her work for advertising agencies, including the prestigious BBDO. She enjoyed the challenge of working in the field of copywriting. However, she soon began to pursue magazine writing and the colorful lifestyle surrounding it. By age 26, she had already sold stories to TV Guide, Cosmopolitan, and The Washington Post. As a freelancer, she was always on the lookout for new and interesting subjects for her writing. In 1970, her writing about her adventure as "the first female stowaway" on a cruise liner caught the attention of several major media outlets.

== Conflict with Scientology ==
Cooper's interest in Scientology began with a disturbing visit from a former BBDO colleague. The man told her that through his involvement with Scientology, he had learned he was the reincarnation of Jesus Christ. After that he announced, "God has decided to rape you," but Cooper managed to get him out of her apartment without incident. She called a former boyfriend who had himself experimented with Scientology and told him about the visitor's claim that he was Jesus. "Maybe he really is," the ex-boyfriend said.

Cooper, thinking she may have stumbled on an intriguing story subject, signed up for an introductory "Communication Course" at the local Scientology "org". Between sessions she explored the facility, asking questions and even taking several documents from an office. One document listed people deemed "suppressive persons" enemies of Scientology.

She began work on a Scientology article in earnest. She later said of her motivation to write about Scientology: "I had a master’s degree in psychology and had studied comparative religion at Harvard for a summer and what I learned during my research about the group founded by L. Ron Hubbard was both fascinating and frightening. The story cried out to be told."

=== Queen magazine article ===
Through interviews with former church members, Cooper learned much about the organization's internal methods of control and the harassment of those who left. When the United States Food and Drug Administration (FDA) raided the Washington, D.C., church in 1963, agents and police seized thousands of pages of documents, from which Cooper gleaned additional insights. She also procured a copy of the Anderson Report, a damning 1965 indictment of the church from the Australian state of Victoria, which denounced the church's methods as psychologically abusive and recommended banning it.

The church's already litigious reputation made many publications wary of Scientology stories. Nevertheless, London's Queen magazine eventually included Cooper's article, "The Tragi-Farce of Scientology", in its December 1969 issue (its last issue before it was absorbed into Harper's Bazaar). While it mainly addressed the harassment of Scientology critics, it was the first Scientology story to delve into sexual misconduct by church auditors. Shortly after its publication, Cooper received two anonymous, telephoned death threats warning her to stop writing about Scientology.

=== The Scandal of Scientology ===
Cooper leveraged her research for the magazine article to produce a 22-chapter book, The Scandal of Scientology, subtitled "A chilling examination of the nature, beliefs, and practices of the 'now religion'". She pitched this exposé as a trove of "exciting, interesting, unknown, controversial material".

Despite multiple lawsuit threats from the Church of Scientology, Tower Publications released the book in June 1971. Its Appendix "The Scientologist's Story" included author questions with answers provided by David Gaiman, then the Public Relations Director of Scientology in England. Soon after publication, the church sued Cooper for libel over the Queen magazine article, though Harper's Bazaar settled the matter quickly. In December, the church followed with a lawsuit against the book itself in Los Angeles Superior Court, alleging "untrue, libelous, and defamatory statements about the Church." Tower Publications would buy itself out of the lawsuit in late 1973, to Cooper's disappointment.

A Scientology defector would later claim she saw a copy of The Scandal of Scientology in the lounge of the Apollo, the flagship of Scientology's Sea Org.

=== Attacks by the Guardian's Office ===
By early 1971, Cooper was being targeted by the Guardian's Office (GO) of the Church of Scientology (since superseded by the Office of Special Affairs, or OSA). This organization, linked to church founder L. Ron Hubbard's wife Mary Sue, was the church's sophisticated spy and intelligence operation. They heard about Cooper's book and tried to stop its publication through various means. They used the church's legal apparatus to threaten her publisher with lawsuits. While she was visiting Scotland for a travel story, dozens of strangers staked out her hotel, and some followed, photographed, or called her; David Gaiman, also a GO operative, even met her at the airport with fake writs for libel.

Early in 1972, a GO memo referred to Cooper as "an unhandled attacker of Scientology", and the organization stepped up its surveillance and harassment. They researched her past, her personal life, and even her college grades. Cooper received many obscene phone calls and some threatening ones. Damage to her telephone lines suggested someone had eavesdropped on her.

In March, Cooper sued the New York Church of Scientology for $15.4 million, hoping to stop the harassment.

Also in March, Cooper was named as one of 18 defendants in another church lawsuit, which alleged a conspiracy to produce Robert Kaufman's book Inside Scientology. This connection put her in contact with L. Ron Hubbard, Jr. (a.k.a. "Nibs"), son of the church founder and a prominent Scientology defector. Together they collaborated on a long essay, "A Look Inside Scientology", while staying with Cooper's parents. Cooper, Nibs, and Kaufman discussed their work on multiple radio and television programs.

Internal GO memos suggest the organization considered plans to ruin Cooper's father Ted's finances and diamond business, "thus cutting off one of P.C.'s financial supports". An imposter had her phone briefly disconnected. A scandal sheet circulated accusing Cooper of sexual deviancy and writing pornography. All this, in addition to the lawsuits, impeded her ability to work. At her lawyer's behest, she began compiling a harassment diary in 1972 to support her lawsuit.

==== Operation Dynamite / Operation Lovely ====
In 1972, the GO launched "Operation Dynamite" to "[attempt] commitment procedures" on Cooper.

A critical sequence of developments and suspicious events occurred in December 1972:

- 6th: Cooper signed a petition offered to her by a canvasser named "Margie".
- 8th: The Church of Scientology in New York received the first of two poorly-written bomb threats. The church alerted the FBI, naming Cooper as a possible suspect.
- 13th: The second threat was hand-delivered to the church.
- 15th: Cooper moved to a new apartment.
- 19th: Cooper's cousin was attacked by an armed intruder while staying at Cooper's old apartment.

In February 1973, anonymous flyers appeared all over Cooper's new apartment building accusing her of various sexual perversions, including pedophilia. Cooper suspected her ex-boyfriend from BBDO had provided the Church of Scientology with certain details mentioned in the letter—details also hinted at in the first bomb threat. The pedophilia claim was oddly similar to an incident involving a church auditor that she had researched for her book.

Soon after, Cooper received a federal grand jury subpoena and learned that she was a prime suspect in the bomb threats. At the hearing, the prosecutor revealed that Cooper's fingerprint was found on the second bomb threat letter. Both letters were also linked to Cooper's typewriter.

Nibs had reconciled with Scientology in the fall of 1972 and probably provided intelligence on Cooper. Details about Cooper in the first bomb threat letter suggested he may have helped write it. He had also had access to her typewriter while they were collaborating. Cooper would later see letters from Nibs to his father in which he claimed to be actively working against his father's "enemies". Such individuals fell under Scientology's fair game policy, meaning they "[m]ay be deprived of property or injured by any means by any Scientologist...[and] tricked, sued or lied to or destroyed." Cooper's fingerprint on the second letter may have come from Nibs, or from the petition she signed in early December.

On May 17, 1973, Cooper was indicted in connection with the threats. By this time, the GO had come to refer to the campaign against Cooper as Operation Lovely, since her code name in internal GO correspondence was "Mrs. Lovely".

While she awaited trial, Cooper depended heavily on several close friends, two of whom turned out to be agents of the Church of Scientology. "Paula" had been introduced to her by "Margie", the canvasser from December. Paula disappeared soon after Cooper discovered a photo of a woman who resembled her in Scientology's Freedom magazine. "Jerry" often stayed in her apartment and would eventually move in for several months, during which time he reported regularly to the GO. In one GO memo, he noted that if Cooper became depressed enough to commit suicide, "Wouldn't this be a great thing for Scientology?" On several occasions, he tried to coax Cooper to stand with him on the dangerous ledge of her 33rd-floor apartment. "Jerry" disappeared after Cooper found his name in a Scientology publication and confronted him about it. Later, former Scientology operatives would identify him as a man using the alias "Don Alverzo", the Church's most senior spy at the time.

Meanwhile, the smear campaign continued. In March, a smear letter was sent to her parents. Similar letters addressed to her boyfriend, which also threatened his career, would eventually destroy their relationship.

The United States of America vs. Paulette Marcia Cooper never went to trial. Cooper made a deal with the U.S. Attorney's office in which she admitted no guilt. On September 16, 1975, the U.S. Attorney's Office formally filed a nolle prosequi in the case. Though she avoided a trial, she still feared the indictment becoming public and damaging her career prospects.

Cooper had failed a polygraph early on, but she passed a truth serum test shortly before the indictment was dropped. She was ultimately vindicated when the FBI raided Scientology offices in 1977 and recovered documents relating to the operation.

==== Operation Freakout ====
The GO's harassment of Cooper continued into 1974. Her father's office received copies of pages from the diary she had kept as a teenager—and still had in her possession. In early 1975, GO agents broke into the office of Cooper's college psychiatrist and stole her records. Later that year, Cooper began receiving copies of her medical records in the mail from anonymous senders. The church compiled a detailed internal report on her that year.

L. Ron Hubbard was reportedly "obsessed" with Cooper. "He thought [she] was working for every group he could imagine that was against Scientology," said Bill Franks, a Scientology member tasked with dismantling the GO after its leaders were imprisoned. "He just thought she was the antichrist." On one occasion in 1975, Hubbard was overheard referring to her as "That bitch, Paulette Cooper!"

In 1976, Hubbard and his operatives in the GO, frustrated by their failure to silence Cooper, developed an ambitious new campaign to discredit her. Dubbed Operation Freakout, its goal was to have Cooper "incarcerated in a mental institution or jail or at least to hit her so hard that she drops her attacks." The plan included staging multiple tightly coordinated incidents involving imposters, false reports, and planted items. Central to the plot was another series of bomb threat letters. One, full of vitriol concerning the treatment of Israel, was to be delivered to an Arab embassy. Another would be addressed to Secretary of State Henry Kissinger.

The new campaign included another scheme to get Cooper's fingerprint on a piece of paper. Cooper suspected such an attempt when a stranger approached her in a bar with a clipboard. Around the same time, she learned that someone impersonating her had made phone calls to friends. In the end, Operation Freakout was never implemented, at least not fully. Cooper may have complicated the plan by moving to Los Angeles to assist with her defense in a Church of Scientology lawsuit there.

An affidavit by a former Scientologist alleges that in 1977 the church was plotting to assassinate Cooper. However, no other source corroborates this, despite voluminous GO documentation about the attempts to ruin her life and reputation.

=== Lawsuits ===
Over the course of its conflict with Cooper, the Church of Scientology sued her nineteen times, operating in courts all over the world. Cooper ultimately counter-sued the church three times.

In Church of Scientology of California vs Paulette Cooper, et al., filed in December 1971 in Los Angeles Superior Court, the plaintiff alleged that The Scandal of Scientology made "untrue, libelous, and defamatory statements about the Church." The case was due to go to trial in 1976, by which time the book's publisher had long-since reached a separate settlement with the church. Despite a strong defense, Cooper, homesick and weary of litigation, also decided to settle. As part of the deal signed on December 5, 1976, Cooper surrendered the copyright for her book to the church and agreed to no longer comment on it publicly. In return, the church dropped all its remaining lawsuits against Cooper.

In the weeks leading up to the settlement, dozens of Scientologists tried to influence the course of events. They regularly camped outside Cooper's lawyer's office and filled the courtroom, hoping to steer the thoughts of the lawyer and the judge in the church's favor.

On July 8, 1977, the FBI raided Church of Scientology facilities in D.C. and Los Angeles in response to Operation Snow White, the church's program to collect intelligence and steal documents related to Scientology from federal agencies. Documents seized in the raid detailed other criminal activities, and the FBI reached out to Cooper for help with the investigation. As she assisted them, she came upon a photo of her vanished friend "Paula", confirming she had been a church agent.

In April 1978, the Washington Post published a pair of articles based on the seized documents. One covered Cooper's frame-up in detail. In the first article, author Ron Shaffer wrote: "The 'attack and destroy' campaign carried out by the Church of Scientology's 'Guardian's Office' to silence critics has involved illegal surveillance, burglaries, forgeries and many forms of harassment, according to sources close to an intensive federal investigation of the Scientologists' activities." The Church of Scientology of California falsely accused Cooper of helping prepare the Post stories, an alleged violation of the 1976 settlement terms. The church filed yet another lawsuit against her on May 25, 1978, and the New York church did the same the following month. Cooper counter-sued in both cases.

On March 9, 1981, Cooper sued the Boston church and L. Ron and Mary Sue Hubbard for $25 million. In August the church filed its 18th lawsuit against her for discouraging celebrity support of a benefit auction for a new Celebrity Centre in Los Angeles.

Around the same time, however, changes in church leadership created a push to settle all outstanding lawsuits and charges. In February 1985, Cooper finally settled with the church for an undisclosed amount. On a few occasions following the settlement, the church tried to bribe Cooper to spy for them.

=== Clearwater Hearings ===
The Church of Scientology had been plotting to take over the city of Clearwater, Florida, since 1975, looking to establish a literal safe harbor for L. Ron Hubbard. The citizenry pushed back. Cooper was one of the speakers at an anti-Scientology rally in Clearwater that drew 10,000 local residents.

On June 1, 1980, the news magazine program 60 Minutes aired a segment about Scientology's takeover of Clearwater. Cooper was interviewed for the story and described her indictment ordeal. In the same program, Scientology leader David Gaiman claimed that Cooper's harassment was the fault of "overzealous" Scientologists and that Hubbard had not been involved in it—despite Hubbard's own policy letters encouraging such activity.

On May 8, 1982, Cooper testified at the Clearwater Hearings, held by city officials over five days to investigate the Scientology takeover. She detailed her history with the church, describing a more than a decade of harassment, lawsuits, and threats. "It was an incredible vindication to look at these [FBI-seized] documents and see that everything I had said about Scientology since 1968 was true, and that they had turned out to be worse than anything I had said or imagined."

=== Activism ===
During the 1970s, some former Scientologists and distraught family members sought out Cooper for help. She connected them with newspaper reporters and magazine writers and encouraged them to tell their stories. She also encouraged fellow journalists to cover the church critically.

In the early 1980s, Cooper published a newsletter entitled "Scientology Clearing-House: A Quarterly Summary of Scientology news (non-objectively) edited by Paulette Cooper".

After the final legal settlement with the church in 1985, Cooper went silent about Scientology for a while. The church's litigious response to a 1991 TIME magazine article caused the mainstream media to avoid stories about Scientology for about fifteen years.

During this time, though, alt.religion.scientology (ARS) formed on Usenet and began publishing secret church teachings. In 1995, an ARS regular posted the complete text of The Scandal of Scientology online. After this, Cooper would occasionally contribute to ARS (and elsewhere online) and she started reaching out again to journalists writing about Scientology.

In the 2000s, mainstream media interest in Scientology began growing again, in part due to the antics of celebrity adherent Tom Cruise. Cooper wrote an article entitled "The Scandal of the Scandal of Scientology", published in 2007 in Byline magazine, the publication of the New York Press Club. In 2011, The Village Voice wrote at length about Cooper's ordeal with Scientology. This article, plus subsequent writing about her early life in Belgium, garnered additional media interest. Also in 2011, Cooper learned that a Vanity Fair journalist she considered a friend had been secretly working for the church for two decades; among other services, he had spied on Cooper.

In May 2015, Tony Ortega, a writer for The Village Voice, published a biography of Cooper entitled The Unbreakable Miss Lovely: How the Church of Scientology tried to destroy Paulette Cooper.

Cooper continues to speak out about the Church of Scientology, enjoying high regard from online activists, ex-Scientologists, and others.

== Career ==
As a journalist, Cooper has written hundreds of stories on a variety of subjects. She produced many of these for the National Enquirer, which employed her beginning in 1974; though she avoided assignments that invaded the privacy of celebrities, she pursued Jacqueline Kennedy Onassis for years, once ending up in the foreground of a photo of Onassis published by the New York Post. On one occasion, she visited Africa as part of her travel writing and investigated the history of the slave trade. She currently writes a column about pets for the Palm Beach Daily News.

Cooper has also authored or co-authored nearly two dozen books, covering a wide range of topics including travel, missing persons, psychics, and her favorite subject, pets. Her 1973 book The Medical Detectives, an early and thorough exploration of forensic science, was shortlisted for the 1974 Edgar Award in nonfiction from Mystery Writers of America. She has also ghost-written several books, including one for Margaret Truman, daughter of President Harry S. Truman.

Cooper wrote a one-act, one-woman play about her Church of Scientology frame-up entitled "The Perils of Paulette". Staged in 1997, it garnered a Chicago Dramatist Award.

== Personal life ==
As part of her career, Cooper moved in celebrity circles. At various times she dated television personality Allen Funt, writer Jerzy Kosinski, and author Ira Levin.

Cooper married television producer Paul Noble on May 17, 1988. They live in Palm Beach, Florida with their two shih-tzus. The couple have authored four books together.

== Awards ==
In 1992, the American Society of Journalists and Authors awarded her their highest honor, the prestigious Conscience-in-Media Award.

== Selected bibliography ==
- The Scandal of Scientology. Tower Publications, 1971. OCLC 921001
- The Medical Detectives. D. McKay Co., 1973. ISBN 0-679-50382-X
- Let's Find Out About Halloween. Reader's Digest Services, 1977.
- The 100 Top Psychics in America (co-written by Paul Noble). Pocket Books, 1996. ISBN 0-671-53401-7
- 277 Secrets Your Cat Wants You to Know (co-written by Paul Noble). Ten Speed Press, 1997. ISBN 0-89815-952-0
- The Most Romantic Resorts for Destination Weddings, Marriage Renewals & Honeymoons (co-written by Paul Noble). S.P.I. Books, 2002. ISBN 1-56171-914-5
- Battlefield Scientology: Exposing L. Ron Hubbard's dangerous "religion" (co-written by Tony Ortega) Polo Publishing of Palm Beach, 2018. ISBN 1727131568

== See also ==
- The Scandal of Scientology
- The Unbreakable Miss Lovely
- Office of Special Affairs (OSA), formerly the Guardian's Office (GO)
- Operation Freakout
- Fair game (Scientology)
