= Beyond Belief (memoir) =

2013 book by Jenna Miscavige Hill

- Author: Jenna Miscavige Hill, Lisa Pulitzer
- Language: English
- Subject: Scientology
- Publisher: William Morrow and Company
- Publication date: 2013
- Pages: 404
- ISBN: 978-0-06-224847-3
- OCLC: 821686618
- Dewey Decimal: 299.936092
- LC Class: BP605.S2 H55 2013

Beyond Belief: My Secret Life Inside Scientology and My Harrowing Escape is a 2013 memoir by Jenna Miscavige Hill. The book was co-written with Lisa Pulitzer. It details her experience growing up as a third-generation Scientologist and her interactions with her uncle, David Miscavige, and her aunt, Shelly Miscavige.

== Summary ==
Hill spent her early childhood at a ranch with about eighty other children and only saw her parents a few hours a week. The children did the majority of the renovations on the site, and they learned to read and write in the classrooms. The ranch is where Hill signed the billion-year contract with the Sea Org. At seven, Hill became the Medical Liaison Officer, providing vitamins and basic medical treatment to her classmates. Hill eventually spent a few weeks with her mother in Clearwater, Florida, where she took the Key To Life course. She had difficulty remembering what she had learned during this time and had to redo the course when she was 11. At 12, Hill moves to Clearwater and joins the Commodore's Messenger Organization (CMO).

Her mother ends up being sent to the Rehabilitation Project Force (RPF) for having an affair, and she goes through her mother's possessions with her father as she is expected to stay in the program for years. Hill's brother is also placed in the RPF. He tries to leave the Sea Org, and she is asked to convince him to stay, with their conversation being recorded. Despite this intervention, he leaves Scientology. Hill also has a conversation with Mark Rathbun, who tells her that her mother will be declared a suppressive person. He arranges for her to meet with her mother, and she convinces her to stay in Scientology.

When Hill is 15, she becomes friends with a boy named Martino. He questions many Scientology beliefs and finds it odd that she spends so little time with her parents. Others notice that they are close and force them to spend less time together. She requests a transfer back to the ranch to reduce the temptation to form a relationship with a non-Sea Org member, as such a relationship would be prohibited. Instead of having her transfer approved, her request is read aloud at a CMO meeting and mocked. She is punished for fraternizing with Martino and put on MEST work. When she tries to contact her parents, she is forbidden from doing so. Hill does not feel her treatment is fair and gets frustrated with being constantly called evil. Eventually, Hill becomes a CMO member in good standing once again. She then becomes a Flag Crew Programs Operator, managing hotels for public Scientologists.

After having several security checks for minor infractions, Hill is sent to Int. When she arrives, she is told by Rathbun and Mike Rinder that both of her parents had left Scientology. Hill is told that she will go live with them and can come back when she is 18. She is angry because she has only seen her parents four times since she turned 12 and does not want to leave the Sea Org. She has a tense phone call with her parents, which ends with them agreeing not to legally fight for her to remain with them. Hill is then assigned two guardians from the Religious Technology Center. She stays in Los Angeles and is devastated to have left all her friends behind in Clearwater. One day, Rinder asks that she read letters from her parents and spend time with them. They avoid talking about Scientology and give her a credit card during the visit.

Hill starts dating another Scientologist named Dallas. They become engaged, but their wedding keeps getting delayed by Scientology executives. After writing a letter to her parents implying that she doesn't want to see them at her wedding, the two are allowed to marry. They are then sent on a six-month mission to Canberra, Australia, on short notice. The couple is tasked with fundraising millions for a Scientology building, even though there were only about 20 practicing members in the country. They encounter people who are hostile to Scientology's message and learn about Operation Clambake. Hill's grandmother dies, and their mission is terminated. The couple has difficulty adjusting to regimented life on the base after their experiences in Australia. Hill begins to question her beliefs and starts calling her parents regularly. She tells Dallas that she wants to leave the Sea Org, and he agrees to do the same. After they do so, the two begin to question Scientology further. After a spokesperson for the Church denies that disconnection exists, Hill writes a public statement countering that denial. The couple then became public figures critical of Scientology.

== Reception ==
Writer Catherine Wessinger stated that the memoir was an "informative and critical portrait of the Church of Scientology." A review in Maclean's considered the author (the niece of Scientology leader David Miscavige) to be part of its allure. The book was described as "sober" and "well-written" in a Toronto Star review. Publication of the book was delayed in Canada by the publisher due to libel concerns. While this decision prevented Canadian consumers from buying it in brick and mortar stores, many purchased the memoir through online retailers such as Amazon, and it became a bestseller in the country.

== See also ==
- Bibliography of books critical of Scientology
- Scientology controversies
