= Miscavige =

Miscavige (from the Polish name Myszkiewicz) is the surname of the following people:

- David Miscavige (born 1960), leader of the Church of Scientology
- Jenna Miscavige Hill (born 1984), American critic of Scientology, niece of David
- Ron Miscavige (1936–2021), American musician, father of David
  - Ruthless: Scientology, My Son David Miscavige, and Me, a 2016 book by Ron
- Shelly Miscavige (born 1961), American Scientologist, wife of David
