= Cadet Org =

Children's working branch of Scientology Sea Org

The Cadet Org is a subdivision of the Church of Scientology for the children of members of the Sea Org (SO), an internal Scientology grouping of the organization's most dedicated members. It operated for about thirty years between the early 1970s and the early 2000s in a number of locations in the United States, the United Kingdom and Australia. Some of its facilities reportedly housed as many as 400 children who were aged between a few months and sixteen years old.

Children in the Cadet Org were divided into two or three different categories reflecting their age and level of proficiency in Scientology. They were typically housed in dorms under the supervision of a small number of adults. Conditions at Cadet Org facilities were reportedly often dirty and unsafe, which resulted in at least two prosecutions by public authorities. The children were granted only infrequent contact with their parents and reportedly had very little time off or playtime.

The Cadet Org was said to have been severely under-resourced, leading to a lack of basic provisions such as toilet paper, food and clothing at various times and places. The Church of Scientology itself reported that the Cadet Org was often treated as a dumping ground for adult staff who had failed elsewhere in the Sea Org, leading to unsuitable people, including pedophiles, working in Cadet Org facilities. Internal church documents and the accounts of ex-members have highlighted recurrent problems with physical and sexual abuse of children in the Cadet Org.

Like the adult Sea Org, the Cadet Org was run on quasi-military lines with a strict daily routine, timed to the minute, that ran from at least 6:30 am to 9:30 pm. Children were given posts and were assigned responsibility for managing various aspects of their facilities, including discipline. They were required to do hard physical labor, sometimes without protective equipment and at very young ages.

The Cadet Org was eventually dissolved around the start of the 21st century after Sea Org members were forbidden to have children, as they were regarded as too great a burden. This reportedly resulted in many female Sea Org members having abortions to avoid being punished by the Church for contravening the ban.

== Origins and policies ==
The Cadet Org was defined by Scientology's founder L. Ron Hubbard as being

manned by children who have actual posts ... Unless they are signed up SO members, the children are used in the galley or estates EPF [Estates Project Force] only. There must be a nursery. There must be QMs [Quartermasters] on duty as reception. There must be stable personnel – and there only could be if this were to have the status of an org. You want quarters where you can have a baby care unit, dormitories, kitchens and moderate space for the Cadet Org desks, auditing and Qual[ifications] functions. Why should they be miserable and knocked about when they can have their own org and be respected and demand respect from their elders as well, and feel proud of themselves.

Hubbard's attitude towards children was to treat them as what he termed "assets". In 1972 he wrote:

In the American society exists a degraded contempt for children. Adults regard them as "dear little cute things God damn them."

This attitude is not allowed in the Sea Org.

THE YOUNG PEOPLE OF A SOCIETY ARE AN ASSET AND MUST BE CARED FOR AND PROPERLY BROUGHT UP AS VALUABLE BEINGS. THOSE WHO DECIDE TO JOIN THE SEA ORG AND BE PART OF THE TEAM MUST BE ALLOWED TO DO THEIR BEST.

He told Scientologists in 1973:

It is not practical at this time to try to run a self-supportive school. Under heading of resources, then, any grandiose scheme would fail. The why of finances is that we are doing the only effective work in the field yet psychiatrists and psychologists who have no result are dragging in all the billions. We must therefore reserve our resources in order to apply them to shorter term expansion, defense, and, of course, taking over eventually the field and its appropriations. Reversely those children will have a role to play in this and are resources. The Industrial age looks on a child as a non-resource and so will anyone in the SO that is steeped in the culture from which they came. They are sentimentally destructive and think it is too cold blooded to look on children as a resource.

In Scientology doctrine, children are regarded as being "adults in small bodies". According to L. Ron Hubbard, their bodies house ancient and immortal thetans or spirits who are capable of carrying out the same responsibilities as any adult. Because their spirits are regarded as ageless, their status as children is irrelevant. Scientologists working as staff members believe that their most important purpose is saving the world and everything else is secondary. Vicki Aznaran, a former church official, explains: "Scientology comes first, and everything else is off-purpose. Parents who want to spend time with their children are looked down on. It's not socially acceptable."

During the late 1960s, when Hubbard founded the Sea Org to accompany him aboard the ships Apollo, Athena, Diana, and Excalibur, caring for children presented a significant problem for Sea Org members. A post of "Governess" was established in 1968 to look after Sea Org children. The difficulty of looking after children aboard a ship is hinted at by Hubbard's instruction that if a child was "found in Hold 1 or any hidden compartment of the ship they are to be locked up."

By the early 1970s, Sea Org members were being based ashore and new arrangements were needed. In 1972, the newly-established Cadet Org was divided into three subgroups: Cadets, who were Sea Org members on the payroll with posts of their own; children, aged 6 and above, who were not on the payroll, and babies or small children, who were under 6 years of age. Children and Cadets were permitted to attend public or state schools in their area, but had to undertake Scientology study in the evenings to "handle any confusions" caused by what they had covered in school. Sea Org parents were allowed to form Parents' Committees to oversea the living conditions and upbringing of Sea Org children. However, parents' contact with their children was restricted; communications "to a child or about a child" were required to go through the Cadets' Commanding Officer "who may alter or cut it if off [program]."

Children who transgressed were to be punished "by placing that child in the [Rehabilitation Project Force] under severe restrictions". The RPF is a program for Sea Org members who are regarded as having violated expectations or policies, and has been characterized by critics as a forced labor and re-indoctrination program. A version for children was established by order of L. Ron Hubbard. It appears to have fallen into abeyance for a while, but a 1989 minute by a Cadet Org staff member recommended its reinstitution. The author wrote that she had "several Cadets and blown [escaped] Cadets who need to go to the children's RPF ... A very small percentage are enturbulative [troublesome] sources and are sabotaging efforts to set the scene right. They need to be moved off the line per Forcing In The Ideal Scene." One particular child, who was named in the document, was recommended to be "moved off everyone's lines and put into the Children's RPF. [He] recently took a razor blade and cut X's in his skin up and down both his arms. He is pychotic [sic] in PT [present time] and needs close supervision."

== Life in the Cadet Org ==
=== California ===
==== Los Angeles ====
Sea Org children based in Los Angeles, California, lived in a number of facilities including a building on Fountain Avenue, another on Melrose Avenue and two three-story buildings at 811 Beacon Street. One of them, Tonja Burden, spent three months at Beacon Street in 1973 at the age of 13. She later testified that at the facility, which housed 400 children,

[m]y duties were to care, clean and feed the children. Myself and another girl my age were the two oldest children at the Cadet Organization. The living conditions were squalid. Glass from broken windows lay strewn over the floors. Live electrical wires were exposed in areas where young children played. We received little food. On several occasions spoiled milk with maggots was served to children. The maggots were removed by hand before the milk was served. In addition to caring for the children, I cleaned toilets daily. I wrote to L. Ron Hubbard explaining the conditions, but nothing improved. Children were not allowed to live with their parents. Scientology permitted one visit every other week, and only for 45 minutes during mealtime.

By the Church's own admission, the Fountain Avenue facility was illegal, as it flouted local child safety regulations. It violated several building codes – it was not the right type of construction for group care of children, children under five were cared for above the first floor, and the children's rooms did not all have exits directly to the outside of the building. The illegalities were discovered by the Los Angeles County and State authorities following a hepatitis outbreak in February 1979. The church was tipped off that it would be raided by California state agents. This gave it time to move the children into an annex building that was hurriedly made to confirm with legal requirements. By the time the raid took place, a church official reported, "there was nothing they could do to us."

One of the nannies, Sheila Huber, said that at the age of sixteen she was put in charge of around thirty children aged under three, all housed in a single one-bedroom apartment: "I couldn't believe it. It was wall-to-wall cribs. There were just under 30 children and they were under my sole care. I had no training." Perhaps not surprisingly, the children had very restricted lives, according to Huber. She later recalled:

They never got outside. Actually, they got out once – in eight months, they got out once. And that ... took three months to get that approved. ... We took them in a van, the children, and took them to the park and they spent so much time in their cribs, day after day, night after night, that they wouldn't go in any space larger than the size of their cribs. They were terrified. They were terrified of sunlight.

==== PAC Ranch ====
Some of the children of Scientologists working at the Church's Pacific Area Command (PAC) base in Los Angeles were housed at Canyon Oaks Ranch near Santa Clarita, California, north-west of the city. According to former Scientologists Saina Kamula and Mirriam Francis, who lived at the PAC Ranch in the mid-1990s, it was a "military-esque" facility that operated "like Lord of the Flies". Francis described it as "a bunch of trailers plopped down on a few acres in desert SoCal area and that's where we studied more Scientology and worked and lived amongst each other." Kamula and Francis say that children were punished by being made to eat lunch behind maggot-infested dumpsters. Similar to other Cadet Org facilities, the children living at the PAC Ranch were made to carry out hard physical labor including demolishing possibly asbestos-laced walls or laying bricks on L. Ron Hubbard Way in Los Angeles. Kamula says that she was made to work for 60 hours a week as an underage teen and suffered severe stress as a result, which led to her being placed on a suicide watch on several occasions. The facility was shut down in 2007.

==== Int Ranch ====
In the 1990s, the children of Sea Org members working at Scientology's Gold Base in California were housed in a facility called the "Int[ernational] Ranch". This was located on five hundred acres of land in the San Jacinto Hills in Riverside County, adjacent to the Soboba Indian Reservation about 20 miles from Gold Base. A cluster of buildings called the Motels occupied the center of the site, with six or seven other buildings scattered around nearby. When Jenna Miscavige Hill was sent there at the age of six in March 1990, she was one of fifteen other children of senior Scientology executives who lived at the site – a figure that eventually grew to around 80.

The site was dilapidated, overgrown and presented fire risks, so the children were put to work renovating it. Although electrical and plumbing work was carried out by adults, virtually all of the other renovation work was carried out by the children. The children were divided into three groups: Children, Precadets and Cadets. The grouping was determined by both age and how advanced they were in their Scientology training. The youngest, the Children, were generally under six years old, Precadets were seven to nine and Cadets nine to sixteen. It was possible for particularly advanced younger children to be Cadets, or for older children who were behind with their studies to still be Precadets. It was also possible for children to be demoted to a lower group as a punishment.

Later in 1990 an increasingly regimented regime was put in place in which the children's activities were scheduled down to the minute. It became more like a military boot camp in which children were made to do what Miscavige Hill describes as "grueling drills, endless musters, exhaustive inspections, and arduous physical labor that no child should have to do." A rigorous system of punishments and internal surveillance was implemented to keep the children in line. Any infractions resulted in being issued a chit, a kind of written demerit, which was kept on record. The children were instructed to report on each other's activities and speak up if they saw any infractions, otherwise they would be considered an accessory to the offense and would receive the same punishment as the offender. This, Miscavige Hill says, "made it difficult for anyone to trust anyone else".

Life for a Cadet or Precadet followed a set, and lengthy, daily routine, overseen by the children themselves in accordance with L. Ron Hubbard's instructions. They wore uniforms consisting of khaki shorts with a red t-shirt or polo shirt with the Sea Org emblem embroidered on it. They also had sweat pants, dress pants and a vest but were not permitted to wear any of their own clothes, with the exception of pajamas.

They were roused at 6:30 am and given half an hour to carry out cleaning assignments. At 7 am they were formed up into seven different Divisions, each under a Division Head, for a morning muster in front of the Commanding Officer Cadet – a fellow Cadet. The children stood to attention with the Division Heads saluting while the Master-at-Arms, another child, read out a military-style report on each Division's status. Uniforms were inspected and the personal hygiene of each child was checked, with their breath and armpits smell-tested and their hair inspected for lice.

Punishments were imposed for lateness or failing inspections. Lateness was particularly harshly punished, ranging from being issued with a chit to having a bucket of ice water poured over the offender's head. Failing a berthing inspection would result at the very least in receiving a chit. An offender might alternatively be ordered to white-glove the room (cleaning it so well that a person wearing white gloves could run their hands over the surfaces without getting them dirty) or in extremis being ordered to sleep overnight in Pig's Berthing, an old mattress in a rat- and bat-infested derelict building on the site. Zoe Woodcraft, who was there at the same time as Miscavige Hill, wrote that she recalled "two girls about nine years old who were forced to spend the night there and in the middle of the night they ran screaming and crying from the building. One of the girls afterward told me that they had been terrified by the bats and couldn't stand it anymore."

After the morning muster, a period of Scientology training was followed by work on the children's assigned posts. Miscavige Hill was made a groundsman at the age of six, responsible for the upkeep and maintenance of part of the grounds, which involved physical labor. A few months later, when she was seven, she was made the Medical Liaison Officer – in effect the site doctor – with responsibility for identifying and treating any medical conditions reported by the children. She was also responsible for doling out vitamins and formulas as specified by Hubbard, which every child was required to ingest daily. No matter how sick a child was, no drugs were allowed other than antibiotics, but visits from real doctors were rare. In the entire time that Miscavige Hill was at the Int Ranch, she did not go to a doctor once despite several periods of sickness.

Breakfast took place between 8:30 and 9 am. A "table captain" was assigned for each table to supervise the delivery of food. This followed by fifteen minutes for the children to clean the dishes and dining room, and then a second muster. Between 9:15 am and 12:45 pm, Monday through Friday, and all day Saturday, the children went to decks or labor-intensive projects. Deck time formally lasted 25 hours per week but work more realistically lasted for at least 35 hours per week for all the Precadets and Cadets, from ages six upwards. They were divided into labor units which were assigned to specific projects, many involving hard physical labor. There was some lighter work such as doing the laundry or cleaning the swimming pool, but the children were also responsible for rock hauling, weeding, planting trees, digging irrigation trenches, landscaping the site and renovating buildings. On Saturdays the children had to carry out intensive cleaning of their berthings and the buildings. The adults at the Int Ranch issued project orders and inspected the results to make sure they were satisfactory, but only rarely intervened to help out the children. The work took place in all weathers, ranging from rain and hail to temperatures upwards of 100 °F (30 °C), with only occasional five-minute breaks permitted. There was no protective equipment and the children often had to wear inappropriate clothing, such as shorts in the winter, as there was no funding for new clothes.

Scientology put forward a number of justifications for making the children do such work. They were told that the labor was an exchange for being able to live on the Ranch, earning their way rather than getting things for free, which was something that only criminals sought. The hard labor was said to be a way to train the children to take pride in their work, face tough situations and handle MEST (the physical world), which would make them better Scientologists. If their work or conduct was repeatedly deemed unsatisfactory they would be sent to the HMU, the Heavy MEST Work Unit, where they would be required to do the hardest forms of physical labor such as deep trench digging. Offenders were also physically isolated from the rest of the children.

Miscavige Hill notes that "we were a group of children who devoted hours of every day to doing the kind of physical labor that no child should have to do." The work was physically taxing:

We got callouses and blisters. We had cuts and bruises. Our hands lost feeling when we plunged them into the frigid water of the creek bed for rocks. When we pulled weeds from the scorched summer earth, our hands burned from the friction and stung from the nettle. The conditions we worked under would have been tough for a grown man, and yet any complaints, backflashing [talking back], any kind of questioning was instantly met with disciplinary action.

Deck time ended at 12:45 pm and was followed by clean-up and lunch. An hour later at 1:45 pm, schooling began in a range of typical academic topics, which the children taught themselves using textbooks and checksheets. There was no teacher but the children were instead overseen by a course supervisor who tested them on an E-meter to see if they had misunderstood anything. This continued until 6 pm, with a fifteen-minute break and a snack. Dinner and another clean-up took place from 6 to 6:45 pm, followed by Scientology training until 9 pm.

Finally, the children were required to fill out Student Point Slips, a kind of progress report for the day, in which various activities were assigned point scores for completion. This was used for the "management by statistics" system implemented by Hubbard across Scientology: the points were tabulated and marked on a graph, which had to show an up-trend each day. Each day ended with an adulation period for L. Ron Hubbard, whose portrait was displayed on the wall of the course room. The children would face his picture, chant "Hip! Hip! Hooray", and applaud the portrait for a couple of minutes. After a short period to get ready for bed, lights-out came at 9:30 pm sharp, ending a thirteen-hour day.

The children had no free or play time, but there were three breaks to the routine during the week. On Thursday afternoons, the children were required to spend two hours tallying up their daily statistics to determine their status in accordance with Scientology ethics and justice codes. Depending on the outcome of the graphing, the children would have to take particular steps to improve or maintain their statistics. If the trend was down, potentially negative consequences would follow, such as having privileges revoked or being given only rice and beans to eat. The children were also given weekly E-meter checks to determine whether they were concealing secrets or transgressions, and had to write weekly reports to their parents. On Friday evenings a graduation ceremony was held for course completions and Scientology media presentations were shown, followed by the disbursement of a five-dollar weekly allowance.

Contact with parents was extremely limited. Jenna Miscavige Hill's father visited once a week for twenty minutes during his lunch break, and was unusual for being one of only a few parents to do so. At 10 pm on Saturday nights, she was allowed to go to her parents' apartment to stay with them overnight. She was also given two or three days off over Christmas. Letters to and from parents were monitored to ensure that nothing negative was said. Any complaints would be treated as "nattering" and punished. Weekly phone calls were also permitted. The children were occasionally let out to attend special events, when Miscavige Hill says they were "dressed up in cute outfits in front of our parents and Int crew to make it seem as though Scientology were creating a normal and joyful childhood, when in fact we were all being robbed of it." Zoe Woodcraft, by contrast, spent over a year there but, she says, "we never went into town for a field trip; never went to a movie, shopping or anything. We were totally isolated. The only time I ever left was when I was allowed once to take a leave of absence to visit my father at Christmas."

In the absence of parental support, Miscavige Hill writes,

[W]e practically were each other's parents, taking care of each other when we were sick, consoling each other when we couldn't sleep, disciplining each other when we acted out, feeding each other meals when we were hungry and helping each other with schoolwork when we were confused. Yes, we were responsible for our post work, deck work, academic work, Scientology course work and cleaning – but, more than anything else, we were responsible for each other.

==== Apollo Training Academy ====
Some children were sent to the Apollo Training Academy (ATA), located on Fountain Street opposite the offices of Scientology publishing house Bridge Publications. Mike Rinder, a former high-ranking Scientology official, describes it as "a cinder block building, with a double-wide trailer in the front, six-foot fence around it with a top on it so outside people couldn't see". It was originally run by a Scientology entity called the Cadets Estate Organization, which was later separated from the Cadet Org. Woodcraft was sent there after returning from a stay in New York in 1992, when she was nine years old, as there was no more room for children at the ranch. She later wrote that the conditions there were the worst that she ever encountered as a child:

[T]he pool was covered over with plywood and we were instructed not to walk on it, as it was flimsy and unsafe. Children played on it anyway as we were often unsupervised. The carpets were old and smelly and there were a lot of cockroaches. We slept in metal bunk beds with chipping paint. There was no proper bedding; not one of us had a complete sheet set, blanket and pillow. I slept without a pillow for many months.

All of the furniture was very old and decrepit. For light, we had bare bulbs hanging from the ceiling. The kitchens had also been ripped out to make more room for people so there were exposed pipes everywhere ... This building was in an unsafe area of Los Angeles and I often heard gunshots at night. It was a very frightening place for me to live.

The bathrooms .... were also not fully functional and we often had no warm water, the tiles in the shower were moldy and we had no soap or towels. In addition, the elevators in this four-story building never worked so we always had to use the steps.

The ATA operated as a Scientology school for about two hundred children. They studied a mixed Scientology and mainstream curriculum comprising L. Ron Hubbard's works plus math, reading and spelling. Unlike the ranch, there was no strict regimentation and the children were able to go to the beach or the park on Mondays. According to Woodcraft, they "would often go to a park and spend the whole day there, also. They would also take us to a fifty-cent swimming pool, however a lot of the kids did not have the money to swim so we just sat around all day. If we asked the teacher for money, she said no and told us it was too bad for us we had no money."

Although the location did not allow for the kind of hard outdoor labor performed at the ranch, the children were nonetheless put to work cleaning the building. Woodcraft recalled being assigned to an activity they called "chicken picking" the carpet. She wrote:

Since we had no vacuum cleaner, we children were instructed to get down on our hands and knees and pick dirt out of the carpet. This dirt included paint chips and we were expected to leave our section in perfect condition. This was very hard to do, especially in the small space between the carpet and the wall. There would be all sorts of small trash in there including paint and staples that hurt my fingers.

There were also problems with the staff at the ATA. Saina Kamula, a former member of the Sea Org, has said that an older member of staff at the ATA repeatedly sexually abused her during her stay there in the 1990s. When she reported the abuse to a teacher, she says, she was punished for being "counter-intention" – acting against the interests of Scientology. The abuser was never punished and remained an "active and respected member of the Church" as of August 2017.

=== Florida ===
During the 1990s a Cadet Org facility operated near Scientology's "Mecca", the city of Clearwater, Florida. It was situated in a former Quality Inn, which the Scientologists called the QI, at 16432 U.S. Highway 19 in Largo, Florida. Woodcraft's entire family of five was initially housed there in 1986 in a single room which was "very small, approximately 12' by 20'. It was one room and one bath; very shabby, infested with cockroaches and smelling of mold. All five of us were in this room so it was very cramped and nearly unlivable." She returned to the QI for a while in 1993 and then for a longer stay from 1994 to 2000, living in a Cadet Org dorm in the building. When 12-year-old Scientology cadet Kristi Erlich flew from Los Angeles to visit her 13-year-old sister Beth at the QI, her first reaction to the sight of her room was one of horror: "Oh my god, I couldn't even believe that Beth lived in a place like that. There were bugs everywhere.... We were always scared of having bugs run across our feet and face and stuff while we were sleeping."

After escaping from Scientology at the end of 2000, Woodcraft wrote a detailed account of life at the QI. She described it as "overall depressing and dreary", and the Cadets and Precadets were kept "always on a boring and strict schedule." The Precadets were never allowed to leave the premises, rarely went on outings and could only play in the parking lot. Woodcraft worked every afternoon and all day on Sundays, which was designated as "renos" (renovations) day where the children worked to repair and refurbish the building. Saturday afternoons could also be designated as "renos", after parental visits earlier in the day. On one "reno" assignment, she was told to demolish the walls of a room in the QI:

This was a strange room that had plywood attached in two layers on all the walls. We were ripping the plywood off the walls. When I asked the cadet coordinator what this room was he told me it was for "ethics particles" who had become upset or hysterical. He would place them (children) in this room and lock them in. Some of them had become so upset that they were kicking holes in the original walls as they were only drywall, so he had layered the walls with plywood so no one could kick through.

On Saturday nights the children could watch a movie, selected by the building's governess. Woodcraft recalled that for a while, the governess "was in love with a move called "White Knight" and we had to watch that movie over and over again for weeks. This was not a children's movie and it was unbelievably boring."

Strict censorship was applied to the children's listening and reading materials. Woodcraft wrote:

Our rooms were searched for offensive materials and if something not approved was found it was confiscated. For example an Alanis Morissette tape was taken away because she was "downtone" and "too much in anger." Archie Magazines were considered "too sexually oriented" and these were forbidden. Seventeen Magazine was also not allowed, nor were any fashion magazines because of the "middle class orientation" and sexual content.

Woodcraft rose through the ranks and took on various jobs, "one of which was to make sure all the pictures of Ron Hubbard looked nice, so I was always cleaning cockroach feces out of the frames and the cardboard backing." In another post, as the Hubbard Communications Office Area Secretary (HAS) and Director of Inspections and Reports, she managed disciplinary affairs: "I had to read the "overt write ups" of the other cadets. This would include the reports written up about masturbation and other sexual activity between the cadets. I also participated in courts of ethics and committees of evidence for children. These are disciplinary actions per church policies."

When she was eleven, she was promoted to the rank of Cadet. This enabled her to move to better accommodation within the building and she was given more freedom of movement. If their statistics were on a rising trend they were allowed to go bowling (always in pairs; they were never allowed to go by themselves) and if they were awarded "Cadet of the Week" status they were given ice cream.

She moved on to the Cadet Technical Training Corps at age twelve or thirteen, studying the works of L. Ron Hubbard for eleven hours a day from Mondays to Saturdays. Conventional schooling was limited to ten hours on Sunday. There was little free time and no days off other than the Scientology "holiday" of Sea Org Day, plus Christmas Day. On one occasion she was allowed to go on a two-week trip. She left the Cadet Org when she was fourteen to join the Sea Org proper, and fled Scientology two years later.

The QI facility came to the attention of the Pinellas County police, who visited it. According to the county Sheriff, Greg Tita, the police "determined that there were signs of child neglect and abuse. They wrote up a report and the case was forwarded to the juvenile office. However, Scientology lodged a complaint against the publication of the report in the press and won. It is still sealed today. I don't think that it has to do with a dispute over the investigation, they just wanted to make sure no information got to the public." According to Tita, runaway cadets were sent by the church to "the children's prison camp", the Rehabilitation Project Force.

=== England ===
A Cadet Org facility existed at Stonelands, a mansion located in the southern English county of West Sussex near the village of West Hoathly. It housed the children of Sea Org members working at Scientology's UK headquarters a few miles away at Saint Hill Manor in East Sussex.

Claire Headley was four years old when she was placed there as one of about forty Scientologist children, with a single adult female Scientologist looking after all of them. Her mother, a single parent, worked at Saint Hill Manor but was allowed very little time to interact with her daughter: an hour a day at dinnertime and three hours on Saturdays. Children were allowed to join the church's permanent staff at the age of eight, but there was no provision for schooling at the facility. Headley later recalled:

We had no parents. So instead we were raised by checklists and statistics. I was responsible for eight children who were all around my age. I had to make sure they followed their checklists – made their beds, showered, brushed teeth, ate meals, went to school, did the manual labor tasks we were assigned, studied Scientology. We were assigned statistics driven by how much of the checklist we completed. There was the time when I was 7 when my mother was sent to the RPF, Rehabilitation Project Force, for having sex with her boyfriend at the time. Why was this memorable? Because I was informed that this assignment meant I was not allowed to talk to her, and I was assigned to a "foster" family who would "keep an eye" on me for the duration of her time on the program.

Headley says that, like cadets in a number of other Cadet Org facilities, she experienced various forms of abuse: "My experiences were by no means extreme. Physical and verbal abuse, sexual abuse, molestation and extreme neglect were very common experiences for cadets. I’ve often found it difficult to share my experiences, because I resent the idea of being considered a science project. At age 7, an older male staff member tried to lure my friend and I to his office to molest us. I refused to go with him and urged my friend not to go with him. My friend chose to go and he molested her. This was never reported to the police." Another former Cadet Org member, Melissa Paris, says that the Sea Org governesses regularly hit the children, who also ganged up on each other. On one occasion, she writes, she was thrown down the stairs by one governess, which led to a rare intervention from her father.

Paris lived at Stonelands between the ages of four and twelve. She recalled that her day started around 7 am, when "we'd muster – we'd all stand in a line, according to divisions. Then we had to breakfast on time, because if you missed it, you didn't eat. Then some would go to Saint Hill and do their jobs. Others would stay at Stonelands and had to clean the house. There wasn't much free time, maybe an hour or two. When I was younger there had been something called Family Time, an hour or two in the evening when you saw your parents". Family Time was abolished when she was about six or seven, meaning that she no longer saw her father during the day.

According to Paris, the mansion was in a run-down state and she experienced grim conditions. Her sister Valeska, who was also at Stonelands, says that "we had no toilet paper 90 percent of the time in the Cadet Org. We either had to use pages from books in the library to wipe ourselves or our hands and wipe it on the wall. I know it's gross but it's true. The toilet had shit all over the wall." Not surprisingly, personal hygiene suffered: "We were Stonelands kids. Dirty. We had lice."

Conditions at Stonelands were still poor a decade later. In 1993, Mid-Sussex District Council prosecuted the Church of Scientology for breaches of fire safety regulations after another Scientology property in the area burned down. Although the Church had declared that 50 people were living there, an internal Scientology document inspection listed more than 190 residents. At least 24 children were living in dormitories of which a Scientology official noted, "Smell[s] of wet beds and bleach ... smell of wet beds needs to be handled."

=== Mexico ===
In 1982, former Scientologist Scott Mayer testified in a public hearing in Clearwater, Florida that he had been responsible for maintaining a Cadet Org facility in Mexico for the children of Los Angeles-based Scientologists. They were kept there rather than in the United States as it was said to be cheaper. According to Mayer, "Children were routinely transported from Los Angeles to the Mexican base and berthed and housed there...so that their mothers and fathers could get on with their business within the Church." However, the Mexican base was unsafe: it was raided at night by thieves who would come in and steal items from the property. Mayer was ordered to procure a rifle with an infrared sniper scope to deal with the thieves. However, it was not needed as the woman who ran the base shot one of the bandits and deterred them from returning.

The physical conditions at the base were also extremely hazardous. The property was thickly covered with brush, which grew right up to the ranch house, and there were poisonous scorpions, snakes and spiders in the area. No money or personnel were initially available to deal with these problems. Mayer eventually resolved the situation by taking a jar of scorpions to his superior and telling him that a child's death would cause bad public relations for Scientology.

=== Australia ===
Sea Org members living in Australia sent children to a Cadet Org facility located in a Sydney townhouse in the 1990s. Scarlett Hanna, who lived there for several years, described it as "an incredibly lonely childhood. I had no-one to talk to or to look after to me or to ask me how I was after school or, you know, any of those things that most of us take for granted." She said that she and the other children did not receive adequate food or medical care.

According to Hanna, the Sea Org successfully managed to conceal the children's living conditions from the city's Community Services department when the facility was inspected on two occasions. She said that the furniture was dismantled and the children were sent out for the day to make it appear that the facility was not overcrowded.

== Decline and fall of the Cadet Org ==
The management of its child members was a long-running source of difficulties for the Church of Scientology. In 1974, only a year after Hubbard announced the creation of the Cadet Org, it was sued for running an illegal child care facility and was put on probation. Five years later, it had a narrow escape when the Los Angeles County authorities discovered that the church was running another illegal child care facility in the Cadet Org's building on Fountain Avenue, Los Angeles. The church was able to escape indictment after being tipped off that a raid was imminent and moved the children into another, legally compliant, building.

Serious problems nonetheless persisted in Los Angeles. An "Aides Order" published internally by the Sea Org in August 1981 reported that in the Los Angeles-based Pacific Area Command alone, there were 339 children aged between newborn and 18 in the PAC Sea Org organizations. (In 1974 there had only been 20 parents in the entire PAC Sea Org.) The way they were being managed was causing numerous problems. The minute noted that they were behind their grade level in the public school system and there were numerous reports of unethical and criminal misbehavior by Sea Org children, including theft and sexual misconduct. It stated: "Due to the recent filthy conditions of the [Cadet Estates Organization] and the criminal behavior of the children the area has become a PR and Legal threat to the Church ... the scene is wildly off the rails and the scene has become very degraded. PAC SO children instead of becoming valuable personnel assets are in many cases becoming criminals."

A series of "missions" by Scientology management through the 1970s attempted to resolve these problems but failed, which the 1981 Aides Order attributed to a failure to follow L. Ron Hubbard's dictates. For instance, parents and the children's adult supervisors caused problems "by treating them as "kids" rather than SO members. This was often covert such as parents insisting that their cadet go on libs [spend time] with them even though the cadet's stats were down and he hadn't earned a libs, resulting in degrade of the cadet's post". The order advised that parents should be "re-educated" to regard their children as "resources and real SO members." It commented that "since the destructive cultural pattern of handling children is deeply ingrained in the US this would need to be stripped off as false data" and concluded that the parents "do not view children as a [Present Time] resource worth investing a lot of time or effort in."

Further problems were caused by the quality of the adult personnel assigned to look after the cadets. The Aides Order reported that the Commanding Officer of the Cadet Org "was criminal and sadistic to other Cadets. He was removed mid 77 after he handcuffed another Cadet to an electrical outlet and nearly electrocuted him." A subsequent investigation found that the Cadet Estates Organization "also had a large number of DBs [Degraded Beings], criminals and perverts posted in it. Some of these would slap the cadets around and treat them like "kids"." This was due at least in part to the fact that the Sea Org had "continually put their unwanted or reject staff" into looking after children. To resolve these problems, the Aides Order proposed a series of reforms which would improve the management of the Cadet Org and make the Cadet Estates Org, which looked after their facilities, an entirely separate body exclusively managed by adults. Sea Org members with a history of sexual misconduct were to be removed from Cadet Org and Cadet Estates Org staff.

However, the problems with pedophilia and poor living conditions evidently persisted, as a December 1989 minute from the Commanding Officer of the Cadet Estates Organization (CO CEO) to the Commanding Officer of the Commodore's Messenger Organization Pacific Area Command (CO CMO PAC) made clear: "The school is a disgrace, with could [sic] food fed to the children as there is no way to keep it hot, 90% of all children under grade level, etc." A Sea Org member who was a qualified teacher was removed from his post due to his admission that he was feeling sexual urges towards the children. The teacher's confession was quoted in the minute:

When I was a nanny for the first ten months of being in the SO [Sea Org] I would ofter [sic] pick up the kids and give them a hug or sit them on my lap. Sometimes when I would do this I would get an erection ... One time I was riding and one of the primary girls wanted to sit on my lap. I let her and after she was sitting on my lap I got an erection. I felt embarassed [sic] and moved her down near my knees. The reaction turned of [sic] after a bit ... One of the junior cadets I was putting to bed at night wanted me to give her a back rub to help her go to sleep. When I did this I got an erection.

In the end, the Cadet Org was shut down entirely. The first step was taken in 1979 when Sea Org members in Los Angeles were forbidden to have children, and people with children were mostly forbidden to join the Sea Org. An Executive Directive was issued which stated:

We have a lot of work to do on the third dynamic [saving the planet] here in PAC and a lot to handle and the time and work having to be expended to cope with the expanding baby population at CCO [Child Care Org] can be better directed toward this.

FROM NOW UNTIL THERE ARE ADEQUATE FACILITIES AND PERSONNEL FOR THE CCO AND THAT ORG IS SET UP TO HANDLE BOTH EXISTING SEA ORG CHILDREN AND FUTURE EXPANSION, THERE ARE TO BE NO MORE BABIES OR PREGNANCIES IN PAC. Any couple violating this rule will be subject to immediate Fitness Board to determine whether they are sufficiently a facility differential to their org and the Sea Org to warrant the expense, manpower and space required to care for their child. If the Fitness Board finds that they are not, they will be routed out.

Any person recruited for a PAC Org who has children must be weighed against his value to the SO versus the expense and work of caring for the child or children.

As a Church website puts it, "by 1986 it had become apparent that the duties of a member of the Sea Organization were not compatible with raising children." A new Sea Org-wide directive was issued in September 1986 which prohibited Sea Org members from having children as the Sea Org did not have the time, money or resources to look after them. Having children was deemed to undermine the purpose and production of Sea Org members. If they disobeyed the Flag Order they would be sent to a distantly located Scientology organization of the Class V level (a medium-level Scientology organization). They could return to the Sea Org once the unauthorized child was six years old. However, Sea Org members continued having children so the new policy was reissued and strengthened in another Flag Order of April 3, 1991. The penalty for having a child was increased; violators would now be sent to "a small non-expanding Class IV org".

Mary Tabayoyon, who was a Sea Org member for 21 years, wrote that this was regarded as a severe punishment: "In a failing Class IV Org an exiled Sea Org member would have to fend for himself or herself and try and raise a child on the nominal compensation provided to the staff of a failing Class IV Org. In addition, the exiled Sea Org members would be obligated to revive the failing Org or suffer more Ethics [disciplinary] conditions." In addition, any Sea Org colleagues who knew about an unauthorized child or pregnancy but did not take action against the parents would be punished. The result of the new rules was that many female Sea Org members who were desperate to remain in the Sea Org after getting pregnant had abortions instead, allegedly under the pressure of threatened disciplinary action.

As a result of the new rules, the Cadet Org was no longer required and was dissolved in the early 2000s.
