= Shelly Miscavige =

American Scientologist (born 1961)

- Born: Michele Diane Barnett; January 18, 1961 (age 65); Dallas, Texas, U.S.
- Status: Unknown if deceased or alive
- Organization(s): Church of Scientology; Sea Org
- Known for: Marriage to Scientology leader and public absence
- Spouse: David Miscavige (m. 1982)

Michele Diane "Shelly" Miscavige (née Barnett; born January 18, 1961) is an American Scientologist who was last seen in public in August 2007. She is a member of the Church of Scientology's Sea Org who married Scientology leader David Miscavige in 1982. Miscavige worked as her husband's assistant and was involved in managing the Church of Scientology's relationship with high-profile member Tom Cruise.

Since her disappearance in 2007, she has been the subject of speculation and inquiries regarding her whereabouts and well-being. In 2012, attorneys who said they represented her responded by saying she was leading a private life devoted to the Church of Scientology. In August 2013, actress Leah Remini, a former Scientologist and critic of the organization, filed a missing person report regarding Miscavige with the Los Angeles Police Department (LAPD). The LAPD closed the investigation within hours and described the report as "unfounded".

== Early life and personal life ==
Shelly Miscavige was born Michele Diane Barnett on January 18, 1961, in Dallas, Texas. Her mother, Mary Florence "Flo" Fike Barnett, was a long-time Scientologist who later resigned, taking copies of confidential upper-level materials with her. Mary Barnett joined David Mayo's Advanced Ability Center, an independent Scientology organization considered heterodox by the Church of Scientology. According to testimony by former high-ranking church executive Vicki Aznaran, "The fact that David Miscavige was linked to [Barnett] by familial ties was extremely repugnant to him and to his wife..."

At the age of 21, in December 1982, Shelly Barnett married 22-year-old David Miscavige.

On September 8, 1985, Mary Barnett was found dead at age 52 from a shot to the head from a Ruger 10/22 rifle. Barnett's body also had three rifle shot wounds to the chest (one surface wound, one through a breast implant, and one that passed through the left lung and fractured a rib), and there were superficial slash marks on her wrists that were identified in the autopsy report as possibly having been several days old. Her death was ruled as consistent with suicide. In affidavits for a 1994 court case, David Miscavige denied any part in his mother-in-law's death, calling it a "personal tragedy in my family's life", though Aznaran testified he had exclaimed, "the bitch got what she deserved".

Shelly Miscavige's 77-year-old father, Maurice Elliott Barnett, died on June 25, 2007. Miscavige was escorted to his funeral on August 1, 2007. She has not been seen publicly since.

== Scientology career ==
Shelly Miscavige was a member of the Sea Org, the organization responsible for the international management of the Church of Scientology and its affiliated entities. From the age of 12, she was a member of the Commodore's Messenger Organization (CMO), the internal Sea Org group responsible for personally servicing Scientology founder L. Ron Hubbard aboard his flagship, MV Apollo, in the 1970s. She was described as "quiet, petite and younger than most of the other Messengers at the time ... and a bit overshadowed by the older girls". Jim Dincalci, one of her shipmates, says that she was "a sweet, innocent thing thrown into chaos".

After marrying David Miscavige, she came to view her husband as the reincarnation of Simón Bolívar and herself as his mistress, Manuela Sáenz. Shelly Miscavige became the official assistant to her husband, who is chairman of the board (COB) of Scientology's Religious Technology Center. According to author Lawrence Wright, she was closely involved in Scientology's liaison with its highest profile member, Tom Cruise. When Cruise began a three-year relationship with Penélope Cruz, Miscavige supervised Cruz's auditing and helped her through Scientology's Purification Rundown program.

After the end of the Cruise–Cruz relationship, Miscavige was reported to have led a Scientology program to find a new girlfriend for Cruise. Approximately a hundred young Scientologist actresses were interviewed, though they were not told why. Actress Nazanin Boniadi was introduced to Cruise and dated him for a few months before he broke off the relationship in January 2005. The search resumed, with more actresses invited to audition for what they thought was a role in a forthcoming Mission: Impossible film. The search eventually concluded with Katie Holmes meeting and marrying Cruise. Cruise's attorney denies that any Scientology executive set him up with girlfriends. Miscavige subsequently oversaw a project to use Scientology members and contractors to renovate Cruise's nine-bedroom mansion in Beverly Hills.

== Disappearance ==
In 2006, Miscavige returned from a trip aboard the Freewinds before her husband did. During her husband's absence, she made appointments to the Org Board on her own. After David Miscavige arrived, Shelly was said to have "visibly changed" her mood and to have "looked cowed". Mike Rinder, then Scientology's chief spokesman, has said that Miscavige asked him if her husband was still wearing his wedding ring. Shortly afterwards, in June 2006, she disappeared and no longer made any appearances in public. Miscavige has not appeared in public since August 2007, when she was spotted being escorted to her father's funeral. (Note: Quote: "That spring, Shelly returned from a Freewinds voyage before her husband did, and in his absence, she decided to arrange the Org Board herself. There were no settled posts, executives were still churning in the Hole, and the management structure was a mess. Taking matters into her own hands, Shelly made a number of appointments. Soon after her husband came back, Shelly's mood visibly changed. Her brother-in-law, John Brousseau, observed that she looked cowed: "The bulldog was gone." Shortly before she disappeared, she asked Mike Rinder if Dave still had his wedding ring on. Then she vanished. ... She was escorted to her father's funeral in August 2007. That's the last time she was seen in public.)

At least two missing person reports have been filed with the Los Angeles Police Department concerning Miscavige. Author Lawrence Wright has mentioned one such report, though he did not say who submitted it. Another was filed in August 2013 by actress Leah Remini; the ensuing investigation was closed within hours by the LAPD and described as "unfounded". The LAPD added that it had "located and spoke[n]" to Shelly Miscavige. Remini, a former member of the Church of Scientology, had previously questioned Shelly's absence from the 2006 wedding of Tom Cruise and Katie Holmes.

As of 2026, the Church of Scientology had not commented on Miscavige's location. Some former Sea Org members have said that they believe Miscavige is being held against her will at the Twin Peaks compound of Scientology's Church of Spiritual Technology corporation near the mountain town of Running Springs in San Bernardino County, California. In 2011, Lawrence Wright said that Scientology spokesman Tommy Davis had told him that he knew Miscavige's whereabouts, but would not divulge that information. In July 2012, in response to speculation in the media on Miscavige's whereabouts, lawyers who claimed to represent Miscavige informed two UK newspapers that Miscavige was not missing and that she "devotes her time to the work of the Church of Scientology."

In 2017 Miscavige registered to vote from Petrolia, California. Scientology also has a base in Petrolia where they house CST documents.

Remini questioned Miscavige's whereabouts during an episode of Leah Remini: Scientology and the Aftermath in December 2018. Remini has pushed for an investigation into the conflicts of interest and relationship between the Church of Scientology and the Hollywood Division of the LAPD. There continues to be speculation about Miscavige's whereabouts.

In 2025, her niece Jenna Miscavige Hill stated in an interview that she believes Shelly is alive, working at the Twin Peaks base, and is stuck in a cult.

=== Popular culture on the disappearance ===
There have been many parodies of Miscavige's disappearance, and the question "Where is Shelly?" has become a meme.

The fifth-season episode "NutriBoom" of police sitcom television series Brooklyn Nine-Nine presents a similar situation to Miscavige's disappearance: a multi-level marketing company central to the episode has its founder's wife on posters proclaiming her to be "happy, healthy and alive" despite not being seen for years.

In the Unbreakable Kimmy Schmidt episode "Sliding Van Doors", the character Gretchen, who rose up in the ranks of a parody of Scientology named Cosmetology, repeatedly asserts that her husband Shelly is "definitely alive."

In John Oliver's Last Week Tonight Miscavige's whereabouts have become a running gag. In his October 2021 segment on Taiwan, and in the March 19, 2023, segment on Timeshares Oliver said, "Where's Shelly?" In his April 2023 segment regarding Mickey Mouse's future lapse into public domain, an animated Mickey repeatedly asked "Where's Shelly Miscavige?", which Oliver stated would become his catchphrase.

At the 80th Golden Globe Awards in January 2023, host Jerrod Carmichael joked that since Tom Cruise had returned his three Golden Globe awards the previous year, those trophies could be exchanged "for the safe return of Shelly Miscavige".

== Family tree ==
Miscavige family tree

Loretta Gidaro
Ron Miscavige Jnr.
Jenna Miscavige Hill

Ron Miscavige Snr.	Becky Bigelow	Flo Barnett
Denise Gentile	David Miscavige	Shelly Miscavige

== See also ==
- Scientology controversies
