= Kendra Wiseman =

Former Scientologist

Kendra Wiseman is one of the founders of Exscientologykids.com, a website that offers "non-judgmental support for those who are still in Scientology, discussion and debate for those who've already left, and a plethora of easy-to-understand references for the curious." She is the daughter of Bruce Wiseman, then-president of the Citizens Commission on Human Rights, a Scientology-sponsored organization opposed to the practice of psychiatry.

In a letter to the editor of the Los Angeles Times, Kendra stated that she left the Church of Scientology at age 17, and five years later, in 2005, her parents and all members of her immediate family were pressured by the church to "disconnect" from her.

In a detailed account, Wiseman illustrated her personal struggle to combine love for her family with different views on the Church of Scientology, which she decided to abandon. Wiseman listed as a main source of suffering the refusal by members of the church to accept that her different opinion on Scientology itself should not limit access to her loved ones and the right to family life.
