= Jenna Miscavige Hill =

American author and critic of Scientology (born 1984)

- Born: February 1, 1984 (age 42) Concord, New Hampshire, United States
- Notable works: Beyond Belief: My Secret Life Inside Scientology and My Harrowing Escape ISBN 9780062248473
- Relatives: David Miscavige (uncle); Ron Miscavige Jr. (father); Ron Miscavige Sr. (grandfather)

Website
- exscientologykids.com; waywarddaisy.com

Jenna Miscavige Hill (born February 1, 1984) is an American former Scientologist. After leaving the Church of Scientology in 2005, she has become an outspoken critic of the organization.

She had been a third-generation Scientologist, the granddaughter of Ron Miscavige Sr. (who would leave the church in 2012), the daughter of Elizabeth "Bitty" Miscavige and Ron Miscavige Jr. (who left in 2000) and the niece of current Scientology leader David Miscavige.

Her memoir Beyond Belief recounts her life within the Scientology movement, and was published by HarperCollins in 2013. She now runs a website which she co-founded with other ex-Scientologists to provide support and foster discussion for people either in or having left the church.

== Early life ==
Jenna was born in Concord, New Hampshire, on February 1, 1984. Her mother was Elizabeth "Bitty" Blythe, and her father was Ronald "Ronnie" Miscavige, Jr the older brother of David Miscavige. She has two brothers, Sterling and Justin.

Her parents joined Scientology's Sea Org just before Jenna turned two years old. From then on she spent most of her childhood apart from her parents and says she was allowed to see them only once a week.

== Life in the Sea Org ==
At age eight she signed her own billion-year contract with the Sea Org, effectively agreeing to follow their rules for life. One requirement of the Sea Org was that families be separated and that "children over the age of six would be raised communally at locations close to Sea Org bases"; at age six she was moved to the Cadet Org (Sea Org for children) school called "the Ranch". At the Ranch, Hill states that in addition to rote learning of the works of L. Ron Hubbard she was expected to do heavy manual labor for 25 hours a week. She described her experience from ages five to twelve thus: "We were also required to write down all transgressions [...] similar to a sin in the Catholic religion. After writing them all down, we would receive a meter check on the electropsychometer to make sure we weren't hiding anything, and you would have to keep writing until you came up clean."

After leaving the Ranch in 1997, she began training in the Commodore's Messenger Organization, where Hill says she was given repeated "security checks", investigations looking for confessions of misdemeanors (known as withholds) from past and present lives. After several months, she was told that her parents had left the Sea Org and requested that she be allowed to leave too. Hill says she was considered a potential risk to Scientology's public profile as David Miscavige's niece, and the confessions were taken to use against her later if she spoke out publicly.

Hill was 16 when her father and mother left Scientology in 2000. Hill states that due to the Scientology-ordered practice of disconnection with relatives and friends who do not support Scientology or are hostile to it, letters from her parents were intercepted, and she was not allowed to answer a telephone for a year.

== Leaving the church ==
Hill met her husband, Dallas Hill, also a Scientologist, in 2001. They married soon afterwards, and later had two children. In 2004, they were sent to Australia on a church mission where they were finally able to access TV and internet and became aware of criticisms of Scientology. One such website was Operation Clambake, dedicated to publishing critical articles and exposés of the Church of Scientology. Shortly afterwards, the couple decided to leave the church. Hill says this was made difficult by the Scientology organization, which threatened her husband with disconnection from his own family still within the church. She further says they were pressured to sign agreements which would entitle the church to claim $10,000 each time she spoke out publicly against the church, which she refused. In 2005, they finally left the church.

== Outspoken critic ==
In 2008, Hill first spoke publicly against the Church of Scientology's practice of disconnection in an open letter to Karin Pouw, the official Scientology spokesperson, in which she details how ex-members are prevented from communicating with family still in the church. The open letter was in response to Pouw's statement refuting allegations about disconnection made in the book Tom Cruise: An Unauthorized Biography. In the letter Hill wrote:

[Disconnection] is a widespread practice and if you dare deny it I have a list of all of [their] names together—these people's families are crying every day because they can't speak to their children who did nothing but leave the Church of their own free will. If I am in fact wrong and you want to prove me as such, then allow me and my family to be in contact with our family members that are still part of the Church such as my Grandpa, Ron Miscavige, and his wife, Becky. Allow the same of my friends. ... Why don't you take the high road for once and put that time towards repairing the families you have destroyed, starting with the family of David Miscavige himself – hell, if Scientology can’t keep his family together – then why on earth should anyone believe the Church helps bring families together!

Hill, along with Kendra Wiseman and Astra Woodcraft (both also raised in Scientology), founded exscientologykids.com in 2008—a website designed to provide a forum and information for people who have either left the church or those still within Scientology who are looking for information.

She has been interviewed about her experiences within Scientology by a number of media outlets, including ABC's Nightline in April 2008, and Piers Morgan Tonight in February 2013 discussing details of the church.

On February 8, 2013, while appearing on radio's Opie & Anthony Show, she stated that she first learned about the story of Xenu from watching the South Park episode "Trapped in the Closet".

== Memoir ==
External videos
- Jenna Miscavige Hill talking about her book (2013)

In 2013, Hill published her memoir Beyond Belief: My Secret Life Inside Scientology and My Harrowing Escape, under the William Morrow imprint of HarperCollins. Jointly written with Lisa Pulitzer, a former correspondent for The New York Times, the book recounts her experience of Scientology in detail. Hill told James Naughtie, host of BBC Today programme, about her book and her life in Scientology's most secretive inner core, the Sea Org. Writer Catherine Wessinger called Hill's writing an "informative, and critical, portrait of the Church of Scientology."

== Personal life ==
Jenna and Dallas Hill have two children. In an August 28, 2023, interview, Jenna said she was getting a divorce.

Hill rebuilt her relationship with her parents, Bitty and Ron Miscavige Jr, who left the church in 2000, and her grandparents Becky and Ron Miscavige Sr. who left in 2012. In 2016 Ron Sr. wrote his own memoir, Ruthless: Scientology, My Son David Miscavige, and Me; he died in 2021. Jenna's two half-brothers, Justin "Miscavige" Tompkins and Sterling Tompkins (who are twins), have both left the church.

== Family tree ==
Miscavige family tree

Loretta Gidaro
Ron Miscavige Jnr.
Jenna Miscavige Hill

Ron Miscavige Snr.	Becky Bigelow	Flo Barnett
Denise Gentile	David Miscavige	Shelly Miscavige

== See also ==
- Disconnection
- Operation Clambake
- Scientology controversies
- Bibliography of books critical of Scientology
