= Lisa Pulitzer =

American writer

- Born: 1962 (age 63–64); New York
- Occupations: Author and journalist
- Spouse: Douglas Love
- Website: www.lisapulitzer.com

Lisa Pulitzer (born c. 1962) is an American author and journalist. Pulitzer is a former correspondent for The New York Times newspaper. She is the author/ghostwriter of more than fifteen non-fiction books. In addition to her own books, Pulitzer has written a number of memoirs including several about young women who have escaped fundamentalist religion including Jenna Miscavige Hill, the former Scientologist, Lauren Drain, the ex-member of Westboro Baptist Church, and Elissa Wall, who wrote about her experiences after leaving the Fundamentalist Church of Jesus Christ of Latter-Day Saints. Pulitzer left journalism in 1998 while pregnant with her first child to concentrate on writing books and has had numerous publications on The New York Times Best Seller list.

== Books ==
Crossing the Line: The True Story of Long Island Serial Killer Joel Rifkin

Her first book, released in 1994 by Berkley Books, is a non-fiction book about serial killer Joel Rifkin and was co-authored with New York Times correspondent Joan Swirsky. It investigated serial killer Rifkin and the crimes he confessed to committing.

Crime on Deadline

Released in 1996 by Boulevard Books, her second book is an anthology of true crime stories and has an introduction by author Edna Buchanan.

A Woman Scorned: The Shocking Real-Life Case of Billionairess Killer Susan Cummings

Released in March 1999 by publishers St. Martin's True Crime, the book examines the story of Susan Cummings, a billionairess who was tried for the murder of her lover Roberto in 1997 and convicted of voluntary manslaughter.

Fatal Romance

Released in July 2001, her fourth book is about the case of lawyer Jerry Akers and the killing of his wife, the romance writer Nancy Richards-Akers who had left him for another man, and the subsequent suicide of Akers. Publishers Weekly reviewed it saying, "At times, Pulitzer's writing is redundant and the chronology of events puzzling, but this is an absorbing account of a romance that was anything but storybook."

Murder in Paradise

Published in November 2003 by St. Martin's Press, this studies the circumstances in which American Lois McMillan drowned while visiting the British Virgin Islands.

The Daughters of Juárez: A True Story of Serial Murder South of the Border

Released in March 2007, the Spanish edition of Daughters of Juarez, written with Univision TV host Teresa Rodriguez, was published by Simon & Schuster and was a bestseller. The book chronicles the unsolved murders of hundreds of young women in the Mexican border town of Ciudad Juárez.

Portrait of a Monster: Joran van der Sloot, a Murder in Peru, and the Natalee Holloway Mystery

On July 5, 2011 St. Martin's Press released Portrait of a Monster: Joran van der Sloot, a Murder in Peru, and the Natalee Holloway Mystery, a book on the van der Sloot case, then pending in Lima, Peru. Her co-author is New York Times Bestselling Author Cole Thompson of A Deadly Game.

The Shadow Catcher: A U.S. Agent Infiltrates Mexico's Deadly Crime Cartels

Released November 2011 and co-authored with Hipolito Acosta, this tells the true story of Acosta, an officer with the U.S. Immigration and Naturalization Service, who went undercover to investigate people smuggling and drug cartels in Mexico. It was described as "A gut-wrenching law-enforcement yarn, simultaneously frightening and uplifting."

No Room for Vengeance: In Justice and Healing

Published November 1, 2011 and co-authored with by Victoria Ruvolo and Robert Goldman, this is the story of how a group of teenagers hurled a frozen turkey for a joke at Ruvolo's car, nearly killing her, and how Ruvolo asked the sentencing judge for leniency for the 18 year old attacker.

Stolen Innocence: My Story of Growing Up in a Polygamous Sect, Becoming a Teenage Bride, and Breaking Free of Warren Jeffs

The book, Stolen Innocence, written with former FLDS member of the Fundamentalist Church of Jesus Christ of Latter-Day Saints Elissa Wall, was published in 2008 by HarperCollins and debuted at Number 4 on The New York Times bestseller list. The book chronicles the life of Elissa Wall, who was one of 24 children, and who was forced to marry her first cousin at the age of 14. Wall escaped the religion and later was the star witness at the trial of its prophet, Warren Jeffs. Jeffs was sentenced to ten years to life in a Utah prison for taking part in the arrangement of underage marriages. Caroline Leavitt said in The People, "Her descriptions of the polygamous sect's rigidity are shocking, but what's most fascinating is the immensely likeable author's struggle to reconcile her longing for happiness with her terror of its consequences."

Beyond Belief: My Secret Life Inside Scientology and My Harrowing Escape

Published in February 2013, Beyond Belief is the escape story by Jenna Miscavige Hill, niece of the current Scientology leader David Miscavige, detailing her experiences growing up in and leaving the church and building her life with her husband while trying to maintain contact with family members still within Scientology. Hill has said how the writing process worked through issues for her, even though at one point she stopped taking Pulitzer's calls because the questions about her mother became too much for her.

Imperfect Justice: Prosecuting Casey Anthony

Released in 2012 and co-authored with Jeff Ashton, this tells the story of the case and trial of Casey Anthony who was accused of the murder of her daughter Caylee. The book is told from the perspective of Ashton who was prosecutor and reveals behind-the-scenes information about the investigation and trial, with his opinions on the prosecution.

Mob Daughter: The Mafia, Sammy "The Bull" Gravano, and Me!

Mob Daughter was published by Summersdale in February 2012 and was co-authored by Pulitzer with Karen Gravano. It tells the story of Gravano growing up as the daughter of Sammy Gravano and marrying within the Mafia. Gravano has received criticism from families of the victims of her father for cashing in on the crimes, to which Gravano responded "I understand their concerns, but the book isn't about glorifying my father's crimes, it's about telling my story; what it was like to be Sammy Gravano's daughter."

Banished: Surviving My Years in the Westboro Baptist Church

Banished was released in 2013 and was co-authored with Lauren Drain, a former member of the Westboro Baptist Church. It tells the story of Drain and her father Steve who became involved with the controversial church. After seven years Lauren Drain was banished by the church after an online relationship and the book gives her insights into the motivations of the church members in spreading hate and the various court cases. One critic wrote "As the tale of one woman's struggle, Banished is a quick, interesting read. But for those looking for a clearer understanding of why something like the Westboro Baptist Church exists and what motivates its members, the book often raises more questions than answers."

Conviction: The Untold Story of Putting Jodi Arias Behind Bars

Pulitzer's most recent book is a ghostwritten work for Juan Martinez released in February 2016. It covers the story of the trial of Jodi Arias from the point of view of Martinez, the deputy county attorney for Maricopa County. Arias was convicted of the murder of Travis Alexander and was sentenced to life imprisonment. Her name does not appear in the book.

== Other work ==
Pulitzer has continued with freelance journalism and has also taught creative writing to children at the USDAN Center for the Performing Arts on Long Island. She was also co-director/owner of the Pulitzer & Panetta Writing & Art Studio in Huntington, New York along with graphic artist Susan Panetta. Joking about her genre of non-fiction writing she said, "I'm now the official cult gal."

== Personal life ==
Pulitzer describes how her own childhood experiences in a blended family gave her insights and empathy for the women she co-authors with who often come from complicated family situations. She is married to author Douglas Love and they have two children. They live in New York City.
