= Ruthless: Scientology, My Son David Miscavige, and Me =

Book by Ron Miscavige and Dan Koon

- US (L) and UK (R) first editions
- Authors: Ron Miscavige with Dan Koon
- Language: English
- Subject: Scientology
- Publisher: St. Martin's Press (US); Silvertail Books (UK)
- Publication date: May 3, 2016
- Publication place: United States, United Kingdom
- Media type: Print (Hardcover (US), Paperback (UK))
- Pages: 256
- ISBN: 978-1-250-09693-7

Ruthless: Scientology, My Son David Miscavige, and Me is a book by Ron Miscavige and Dan Koon published in 2016 in the United States and United Kingdom. It presents the personal account of Ron Miscavige's almost five decades in the Church of Scientology, the rise of his son David Miscavige to the church's top leadership role, his decision to leave the church, his escape in 2012, and the aftermath.

== Background ==
St. Martin's Press, the book's US publisher, describes it as "a riveting insider's look at life within the world of Scientology" which tells the story of "David Miscavige's childhood and his path to the head seat of the Church of Scientology told through the eyes of his father." According to the UK publisher, "Ron [Miscavige] traces the arc of David's life from his early years to David's eventual, stellar rise to power in Scientology; his brutal approach to running the organisation today; and the disastrous effects that his leadership has had on countless numbers of Scientologists and their families."

Ruthless tells of how Ron Miscavige and his family joined Scientology in 1971, living for a while in the UK, before moving back to the US. By the age of 16, his son David had become a confidant of Scientology's founder, L. Ron Hubbard, and had joined the inner core of the church, the Sea Org. He took over the leadership of Scientology when Hubbard died in 1986.

In 2012, after gaining access to the full Internet via Kindle, Ron Miscavige discovered new information about the church and subsequently left the Church of Scientology. The Los Angeles Times reported that he was put under surveillance by the Church, which was said to have paid two private investigators to watch him around the clock for 18 months at a cost of $10,000 a week. The surveillance was said to have been "all because [David] Miscavige feared that his father would divulge too much about the organisation's activities." At one point, the investigators were said to have phoned David Miscavige when they thought his father was having a heart attack and were allegedly told not to intervene: "if it was Ron's time to die, to let him die and not intervene in any way". David Miscavige denied having ordered the surveillance or speaking to one of the investigators. The incident prompted Ron Miscavige to write the book. According to Tony Ortega, a journalist and writer on Scientology, Ruthless was originally titled If He Dies, He Dies in reference to the "heart attack" incident.

The book is the second memoir to have been published by one of David Miscavige's relatives, after his niece Jenna Miscavige Hill published Beyond Belief: My Secret Life Inside Scientology and My Harrowing Escape in 2012.

== Reception ==
The release of the book was preceded by an interview with Ron Miscavige on ABC News' long-running news show 20/20, broadcast on April 29, 2016. In response, Church of Scientology International sent a statement to ABC News criticizing Ron Miscavige and extolling David Miscavige.

In March 2017, Ron Miscavige was the guest on The Thinking Atheist podcast where he was interviewed by host Seth Andrews. Miscavige discussed this book in detail, and elaborated on his escape from Scientology. Miscavige also appeared on The Joe Rogan Experience podcast on April 18, 2017, for an interview about his life in Scientology as detailed in this book.

Thomas C. Tobin of the Tampa Bay Times reviewed the book, writing that the author "describ[es] his son as a tyrant who has turned the organization into a destructive influence." Tobin wrote that Ron Miscavige said the church had "morphed into an immoral organization that hides a long list of abuses behind First Amendment protections, spends millions to investigate and harass its critics, and has destroyed families—including his own—through its practice of disconnection."

The Church of Scientology threatened to sue both the US and UK publishers, alleging that the book contained "malicious, false, misleading and highly defamatory allegations". Humfrey Hunter, the owner of Silvertail Books, told The Guardian that he was "definitely going ahead [with publishing]—there's no question. I'm very confident that if they were to sue, we would be able to successfully defend the book and its content."

== Ron Miscavige ==
Ron Miscavige Sr.
- Died: 2021
- Spouse(s): Loretta Miscavige; Becky Bigelow
- Children: David Miscavige; Ron Miscavige Jr.
- Relatives: Jenna Miscavige Hill (granddaughter)
- Writing career
- Notable works: Ruthless: Scientology, My Son David Miscavige, and Me

Ron Miscavige and his wife Loretta (m. 1957) lived in New Jersey with their four children. He entered into Scientology in 1969, and in 1985 joined Scientology's Sea Org where he lived at Gold Base and composed music for church albums and promotional materials. After leaving Scientology in 2012, he lived in the Milwaukee area with his second wife, Becky Bigelow (m. 1990), and played trumpet with several local bands. Miscavige died in 2021 at the age of 85.

== See also ==
- Bibliography of books critical of Scientology
- Scientology controversies
