= Exscientologykids.com =

ExScientologyKids
- Creators: Kendra Wiseman, Astra Woodcraft, and Jenna Miscavige Hill
- Website: exscientologykids.com
- Launched: 2008

Exscientologykids.com is a website launched in 2008 by Kendra Wiseman, Astra Woodcraft and Jenna Miscavige Hill. It is dedicated to publishing affidavits of former child members of the Church of Scientology.

The website makes numerous allegations against the Church of Scientology, including that they deprive children of a proper education and that church members engage in physical abuse against children. The website's founders also provide safe houses to members who have recently left the church. These safe houses also provide services for reuniting families and helping ex-members with financial difficulties. In a statement to the press, a spokesperson for the Church of Scientology claimed that the website is "full of lies".
