= Disconnection (Scientology) =

Mandated shunning-type practice

- Type: Practice in Scientology
- Description: The severing of communication and association with those antagonistic to Scientology or declared a suppressive person
- Role: To restrict members' contact with individuals considered likely to undermine their involvement in Scientology
- Key texts: Scientology ethics and justice policies
- Associated controversies: Reports of family separation, coercion, social pressure

Disconnection is the severance of all ties between a Scientologist and a friend, colleague, or family member deemed to be antagonistic towards Scientology. The practice of disconnection is a form of shunning. Among Scientologists, disconnection is viewed as an important method of removing obstacles to one's spiritual growth. In some circumstances, disconnection has ended marriages and separated children from their parents.

The Church of Scientology has repeatedly denied that such a policy exists, though as of February 2012 its website acknowledged the practice and described it as a human right. In the United States, the Church (Note: Use of "Church" or "the Church" is a common shortened form of "Church of Scientology"; see The Church (Scientology).) has tried to argue in court that disconnection is a constitutionally protected religious practice. However, this argument was rejected because the pressure put on individual Scientologists to disconnect means it is not voluntary.

== Policy ==
Antagonists to the Church of Scientology are declared by the Church to be suppressive persons (SPs) or potential trouble sources (PTSes). The Church teaches that association with these people impedes a member's progress along the Bridge to Total Freedom.

In Introduction to Scientology Ethics, L. Ron Hubbard sets out the doctrine that by being connected to suppressive persons, a Scientologist could become a Potential Trouble Source (PTS):

A Scientologist can become PTS by reason of being connected to someone that is antagonistic to Scientology or its tenets. In order to resolve the PTS condition, he either HANDLES the other person's antagonism (as covered in the materials on PTS handling) or, as a last resort when all attempts to handle have failed, he disconnects from the person. He is simply exercising his right to communicate or not to communicate with a particular person.

Hubbard defined "handling" as an action to lessen a situation towards an antagonistic individual by means of communication, and disconnection as a decision to cut communication with another individual. Hubbard also wrote that ethics officers should recommend handling rather than disconnection when the antagonistic individual is a close relative. He also stated that failure, or refusal, to disconnect from a suppressive person is a suppressive act by itself. In one case cited by the UK government, a six-year-old girl was declared suppressive for failing to disconnect from her mother. Sociologist Roy Wallis reports that Scientologists connected to a suppressive would usually be required to handle or disconnect, although he found some "Ethics Orders" which ordered unconditional disconnection.

[In the child custody case, t]here had been much evidence as to how Scientology broke up marriages and alienated children from their parents. He gave examples which showed "the ruthless and inhuman disciplinary measures" used. The methods blocked out all reasoning powers, and everything had to be paid for.

According to Church statements, disconnection is used as a "last resort", only to be employed if the people antagonistic to Scientology do not cease their antagonism—even after being provided with "true data" about Scientology, since it is taught that usually only people with false data are antagonistic to the Church.

Originally, disconnection involved not only ending communication with someone but also declaring it publicly. The Scientology publication The Auditor included notices of disconnection from named individuals. It was also common for Scientologists to send short letters to the suppressive person, to warn them that they were disconnected. Roy Wallis interviewed a number of people who had been declared suppressive, some of whom had received hundreds of these letters. The Scientologist was also required to take "any required civil action such as disavowal, separation or divorce" to cut off contact with the suppressive.

The policy was introduced in 1965 in a policy letter written by Hubbard. The "Code of Reform" introduced by Hubbard in 1968 discontinued fair game and security checks, and cancelled "disconnection as a relief to those suffering from familial suppression". However, although the words "fair game", "disconnection", and "security checking" were discontinued due to them causing bad public relations, the practices continued with alternate labels. When the New Zealand Government set up a Commission of Inquiry into Scientology, L. Ron Hubbard wrote to them saying that disconnection had been cancelled and that there was no intention to bring it back. The Commission welcomed the letter, but noted Hubbard did not promise never to re-introduce the practice of disconnection.

In his book A Piece of Blue Sky, Jon Atack cites an internal document dated August 1982 that, he alleges, re-introduced the disconnection policy. A belief that disconnection was being used again, and not as a last resort, led a group of British Scientologists to resign from the Church in 1984, while keeping their allegiance to the beliefs of Scientology. Their interpretation was that the teachings of L. Ron Hubbard "encourage the unity of the family" and therefore that the disconnection policy was "a misrepresentation or misapplication".

== Examples of application ==
=== 1960s ===
In 1966, UK newspaper the Daily Mail quoted a disconnection letter from Scientologist Karen Henslow to her mother:

Dear Mother, I am hereby disconnecting from you because you are suppressive to me. You evaluate for me, invalidate me, interrupt me and remove all my gains. And you are destroying me.

I [unreadable] from this time consider myself disconnected from you and I do not want to see you or hear from you again. From now you don't exist in my life.

Henslow, a thirty-year-old sufferer from manic depression, had been a Scientology staff member for two weeks when she disconnected. The message was accompanied by a second letter apologising for the first and saying that it had been mailed without her permission.

Raymond Buckingham, a singer who ran a voice school in Manhattan, was recruited into Scientology by one of his pupils. He was asked to disconnect from a business associate who had been labelled suppressive. When he spoke out publicly against Scientology, his Scientologist pupils disconnected from him and refused to pay him. One of these was a famous singer for whom he had arranged a series of performances.

Roy Wallis reproduced a "Disconnection Order" from 1965 which orders a Scientologist to disconnect from the publications of the Food and Drug Administration. It states, "The FDA literature he comes in contact with is not to be read by him at all."

Disconnection was the subject of a 1970 court case in which the Church of Scientology unsuccessfully attempted to sue the Member of Parliament (MP) Geoffrey Johnson-Smith over negative comments he had made on BBC television. To defend his claims that families were being alienated, he produced evidence of specific cases in court. The judge described it as "astonishing" that the Scientologists did not contest these allegations.

In 1969, the New Zealand government set up an official inquiry into the Church of Scientology. The ensuing Dumbleton-Powles Report quoted from a number of disconnection letters and also reproduced some "Ethics Orders" which identified suppressive persons who were "not to be communicated with in any way". Teenage Scientologist Erin O'Donnell had written to her non-Scientologist aunt, "If you try to ring me I will not answer, I will not read any mail you send, and I refuse to have anything to do with you in any way whatsoever. All communication is cut completely." The Commission concluded that Scientologists had been required to choose between family relationships and continued involvement in Scientology.

The 1971 UK government investigation into Scientology and ensuing Foster Report reproduced a number of internal "Ethics Orders". One of these, dating from November 1967, concerns a member who had asked for a refund. It declares him to be a suppressive person and continues, "Any and all persons connected [to him] are declared Potential Trouble Sources and are not to be Trained or Processed before they have presented evidence in writing ... of handling or disconnecting".

Joe Boyd, the manager of the Incredible String Band, was a Scientologist for a time in the early 1970s. He left when he was told that friends who were hostile to Scientology were interfering with his progress and he must disassociate from them.

Cyril Vosper received a "Declaration of Enemy" in response to his violations of Scientology ethics and justice codes. It is reproduced in his book The Mind Benders and states, "Anyone connected to him is not to be processed or trained until he or she has disconnected from him in writing."

=== 1980s and 1990s ===
In 1982, David Mayo and other former Church of Scientology executives were subjected to an internal "Committee of Evidence" for alleged transgressions. The committee issued a permanent writ of Disconnection, forbidding all other Scientologists from having contact with the accused.

In A Piece of Blue Sky, Jon Atack describes being ordered to disconnect from a friend in 1983, shortly after the policy was re-introduced.

In his 1984 High Court judgment, which considered many aspects of Scientology, English judge Justice Latey wrote that "many examples [of disconnection] have been given and proved in evidence." As examples, he reproduced two disconnection letters. One is written by a Scientologist to his fiancée. In the other, a man writes to his business partner and former friend, "What you are now doing in setting yourself against the Church is not only very suppressive but also non-survival for you, your family and any group you are associated with."

That year, the Daily Mail brought up further examples of disconnection, including a 13-year-old boy who disconnected from his father and a woman who said her fiancé was forced to abandon her. The fiancé concerned said "it was a personal decision" and a Church of Scientology spokesman was quoted denying that there is a policy to split up relationships.

Also in 1984, The Mail on Sunday interviewed Gulliver Smithers, a former Scientologist who had left the group's base at Saint Hill Manor when he was 14 years old. Smithers explained that disconnection was an everyday part of life in Saint Hill, "It goes round by word of mouth when someone is an outcast. He or she is just ignored and shunned. It was what we were brought up to do."

In a lengthy court case in the 1980s, ex-member Lawrence Wollersheim successfully argued that he had been coerced into disconnecting from his wife, parents, and other family members. Since the disconnection was not voluntary, it did not count as protected religious practice.

In 1995, the UK local paper Kent Today talked to Pauline Day, whose Scientologist daughter Helen had sent a disconnection letter and then dropped all contact, even changing her phone number. A spokeswoman for the Church of Scientology denied that this decision had anything to do with the Church.

=== 21st century ===
A Buffalo News investigation in 2005 spoke to the sisters and brother of Fred Lennox, a Scientologist who, according to them, was being manipulated and exploited financially by the group. The paper also quoted an internal so-called "Ethics Order" instructing him to "handle or disconnect" from his sister Tanya because of anti-Scientology comments she had made online. Lennox himself and Church of Scientology spokesmen denied this.

Ex-Scientologist Tory Christman told Rolling Stone magazine that her Scientologist husband and friends refused to talk to her after she left the Church.

In January 2008, Jenna Miscavige Hill, niece of David Miscavige, spoke out about the policy's effect on her family. She revealed that, once her parents left the Church while she remained, she had been forbidden to answer the telephone in case she spoke to them and that her parents only restored occasional access to her by threatening legal action. Another second-generation Scientologist, Astra Woodcraft, told ABC's Nightline that she had been forbidden any contact with her father once he left the Church and she was still a member. She used her weekly laundry time to secretly meet up with him.

To make the television documentary Scientology and Me, the BBC Panorama team spoke to two mothers whose daughters had disconnected, one for nearly seven years. Mike Henderson, an ex-Scientologist, told Panorama how he had not spoken to his father during his time as a member. When Henderson left Scientology, he re-established communication with his father, but most of the rest of the family disconnected from Henderson as a result.

Actor Jason Beghe has alleged that after he left the Church of Scientology in 2007, former friends who remained in the Church disconnected from him.

In 2009, a man named Shane Clark was about to be declared a suppressive person for being employed by Marc Headley, author of Blown for Good: Behind the Iron Curtain of Scientology. Clark secretly recorded a meeting between himself and Scientology spokesman Tommy Davis and his wife Jessica Feshbach. In the tape, Davis is heard not only threatening Clark with suppressive person declaration, but telling him he will be the subject of disconnection. Clark was later declared, and his family disconnected from him. Despite the direct evidence to the contrary, Davis denied the existence of the disconnection policy in a television interview on CNN. Paul Haggis, a film director, disputed this in his 2009 resignation letter from Scientology. Haggis wrote, "We all know this policy exists", and said his wife had been ordered to disconnect from her ex-Scientologist parents, "although it caused her terrible personal pain. For a year-and-a-half, [she] didn't speak to her parents and they had limited access to their grandchild. It was a terrible time." In response, Davis reiterated that there is no Church policy of disconnection.

When actress Leah Remini publicly left the Church in 2013, Remini's sister, Nicole, revealed that she and the rest of Remini's family did as well to avoid being split up by the Church's disconnection policy.

== Comments by religious scholars ==
The St. Petersburg Times consulted three religious scholars about disconnection in Scientology, two of whom had been recommended by the organization itself. One, F. K. Flinn of Washington University in St. Louis, said that shunning practices such as disconnection are common to young religions. He drew parallels with the dis-fellowship practiced by Jehovah's Witnesses.

This view is not shared by all religious scholars. J. Gordon Melton, of the Institute for the Study of American Religion, said that disconnection goes much further than the policies of most modern religions, and commented "I just think it would be better for all concerned if they just let them go ahead and get out and everyone goes their own way, and not make such a big deal of it. The policy hurts everybody." Newton Maloney of Fuller Theological Seminary also described the policy as "too extreme".

Buffalo News consulted Stephen A. Kent of the University of Alberta, who said that hostility towards critics, including the member's own family, is an ingrained part of Scientology ethics and justice, according to which the survival of the Church is all-important.

== In popular culture ==
William S. Burroughs, who briefly dabbled with Scientology, wrote extensively about it during the late 1960s, weaving some of its jargon into his fictional works, as well as authoring nonfiction essays about it. He uses the term "Disconnect" in a Scientological context in Ali's Smile: Naked Scientology and other works. In the end, however, he abandoned Scientology and publicly criticized it in an editorial for the Los Angeles Free Press in 1970.

== See also ==
- Suppressive person – Scientology version of antisocial personality
- Shunning – Act of social rejection, or emotional distance
- Excommunication – Censure used to deprive, suspend, or limit membership in a religious community
- Jehovah's Witnesses congregational discipline – Congregation discipline as practiced by Jehovah's Witnesses
- Church membership council – Form of discipline in the LDS church
- Ostracism – Democratic procedure for expelling citizens
- Social rejection – Exclusion of someone from social relations
- Social alienation – Disconnection in social relationships
