= David Miscavige =

Leader of the Church of Scientology (born 1960)

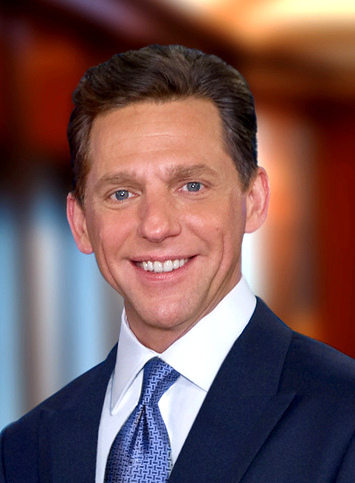
- Miscavige in 2011
- Born: April 30, 1960 (age 66); Bristol, Pennsylvania, U.S.
- Occupations: Chairman of the board; Religious Technology Center
- Years active: 1971–present (Scientology member); 1986–present (Leader of the Church of Scientology)
- Organization: Church of Scientology
- Spouse: Shelly Barnett (m. 1982)
- Parents: Ron Miscavige (father); Loretta Gidaro (mother)
- Relatives: Jenna Miscavige Hill (niece)
- Website: davidmiscavige.org

David Miscavige (/mɪsˈkævɪdʒ/; born April 30, 1960) is an American Scientologist who has led the Church of Scientology since the death of its founder, L. Ron Hubbard, in 1986. His official title within the organization is chairman of the board of the Religious Technology Center (COB RTC). RTC is a corporation that controls the trademarks and copyrights of Dianetics and Scientology. He is also referred to within the Scientology organization as "DM", "COB", and "captain of the Sea Org".

Miscavige was a deputy to Scientology founder L. Ron Hubbard as a teenager. He joined the Sea Org, a management group for the Scientology organization, then later joined the Commodore's Messenger Organization, a group within the Sea Org that carried Hubbard's orders to subordinates. He rose to a leadership role by the early 1980s and was named "chairman of the board" of RTC in 1987, the year after Hubbard's death. Official Church of Scientology biographies describe Miscavige as "the ecclesiastical leader of the Scientology religion".

Since he assumed his leadership position, there have been a number of allegations made against Miscavige. These include claims of human trafficking, child abuse, slavery, forced separation of family members, coercive fundraising practices, harassment of journalists and Scientology critics, and emotional and physical abuse of subordinates by Miscavige. Miscavige and spokespersons for the Scientology organization deny the majority of such statements, often making derogatory comments about and attacking the character of those who make them.

Miscavige has been investigated by the Federal Bureau of Investigation due to allegations of criminal activities within the Scientology organization. He is named as a defendant in numerous lawsuits involving his role in the organization. One such lawsuit, filed in April 2022, refers to repeated sexual assault of children by senior Scientology executives in the Sea Org during Miscavige's leadership. The case also involves allegations of human trafficking, forced labor, and other forms of child abuse.

== Early life ==
David Miscavige was born in Bristol, Pennsylvania, on April 30, 1960. His parents, Ronald Thomas "Ron" Miscavige Sr. and Loretta Gidaro, were Catholics of Polish-Italian heritage. Miscavige and his twin sister, Denise, were raised primarily in Willingboro Township, New Jersey. As a child, Miscavige played baseball and football, but he suffered from asthma and severe allergies. His father, a trumpet player, became interested in Scientology and sent the younger Miscavige to see a Scientologist. According to both father and son, a 45-minute Dianetics session cured Miscavige's ailments.

Miscavige's family joined the Church of Scientology in 1971 and eventually moved to the organization's world headquarters at Saint Hill Manor in West Sussex, England. Saint Hill served as Miscavige's training ground as an auditor, and he is remembered by the Scientology organization as a "12-year-old prodigy" who became its youngest professional auditor. The family returned to Philadelphia within a few years, where Miscavige attended Marple Newtown High School.

== Early career in Scientology ==
In 1976, with his father's permission, Miscavige left high school on his sixteenth birthday and moved to Clearwater, Florida, to join the Sea Org, a Scientologist organization established in 1968 by founder L. Ron Hubbard. Some of his earliest jobs in the Sea Org included delivering telexes, groundskeeping, food service and taking photographs for Scientology brochures.

Miscavige was appointed to an elite group of young Scientologists within the Sea Org called the Commodore's Messenger Organization (CMO), which Hubbard had established to carry out his personal errands and deliver executive directives to Scientology management. As they grew into adolescence, the Messengers' power and influence within the Sea Org increased. By 1977, Miscavige was living in La Quinta, California, working directly under Hubbard as a cameraman for Scientology training films at CMO Cine Org.

== Rise to leadership position ==
In 1981 David Miscavige had begun the year as a cameraman at Gilman Hot Springs and a junior member of the Commodore's Messenger Organization. He ended it in charge of the Watchdog Committee and the All Clear Unit which he announced was now senior to CMO International.

— Stewart Lamont, Religion Inc.

In the late 1970s, after the public relations disaster of the criminal convictions of eleven leaders of the Guardian's Office, including Hubbard's wife Mary Sue, Hubbard had to maintain his distance from Church management since he had formally resigned in 1966. Hubbard further distanced himself from the Guardian's Office, his wife, and CMO—which stood for Commodore Messengers Org where "Commodore" had been Hubbard's title as leader of the Sea Org.

In April 1979, the Watchdog Committee was formed, consisting of the senior executives of CMO International, with Miscavige assuming a prominent role. When Hubbard went into hiding with Pat and Annie Broeker in 1980, Miscavige became the sole link between Hubbard and church leaders, secretly relaying Hubbard's orders from the Broekers. In early 1981, Miscavige set up the All Clear Unit "which was allegedly designed to work towards a situation when Hubbard could come back on lines"; to be "All Clear" for Hubbard to emerge from hiding.

By the end of 1981, Miscavige was in charge of the Watchdog Committee and the All Clear Unit, as well as Author Services Inc., a for-profit entity established in 1981 to manage Hubbard's literary and financial affairs. As head of the CMO, Miscavige sent out teams to investigate problem areas within Scientology.

Next, setting his sights on dismantling the larger and more powerful Guardian's Office, Miscavige strong-armed Hubbard's wife Mary Sue to resign from her post as Guardians' controller, removed several other GO officials, and purged several more through Comm Evs including David Gaiman, Duke Snider, Mo Budlong and Henning Heldt. The St. Petersburg Times later reported: "During two heated encounters, Miscavige persuaded Mary Sue Hubbard to resign. Together they composed a letter to Scientologists confirming her decision – all without ever talking to L. Ron Hubbard." She subsequently changed her mind, believing that she had been tricked. Despite this, Miscavige claims he and Mary Sue remained friends thereafter.

=== Corporate restructuring ===
In 1982, Miscavige set up a new organizational structure to insulate Hubbard from personal liability and to handle his personal wealth through a corporate entity outside of the Scientology network. He established the Religious Technology Center (RTC), an entity responsible for licensing Scientology's intellectual property, and Author Services Inc. to manage the proceeds. Miscavige has held the title of chairman of the board of the RTC since the organization's founding. The Church of Spiritual Technology (CST) was created at the same time with an option to repurchase all of RTC's intellectual property rights. In a 1982 probate case, Ronald DeWolf, Hubbard's estranged son, accused Miscavige of embezzling from and manipulating his father. Hubbard denied this in a written statement, saying that his business affairs were being well managed by Author Services Inc., of which Miscavige was also chairman of the board. In the same document, Hubbard called Miscavige a "trusted associate" and "good friend" who had kept his affairs in good order. A judge ruled the statement was authentic. The case was dismissed on June 27, 1983.

In October 1982, Miscavige required Scientology Missions to enter new trademark usage contracts which established stricter policies on the use of Scientology materials. Over the two years following the formation of the RTC, Miscavige and his team replaced most of Scientology's upper and middle management. A number of those ousted attempted to establish breakaway organizations including the Advanced Ability Center led by David Mayo, a former RTC board member who had also been Hubbard's personal auditor. The Advanced Ability Center closed in 1984, two years after opening.

== 1986–2009: leadership of Scientology organization ==
When Hubbard died in 1986, Miscavige announced his death to Scientologists at the Hollywood Palladium. Shortly before his death, an apparent order from Hubbard circulated in the Sea Org that promoted Scientologist Pat Broeker and his wife to the new rank of Loyal Officer, making them the highest-ranking members; Miscavige asserted this order had been forged. After Hubbard's death, Miscavige assumed the position of head of the Church of Scientology and, according to the organization, "ecclesiastical leader of the Scientology religion." Within the Sea Org, Miscavige holds the title of "captain of the Sea Organization" and is its highest-ranking member.

Since Miscavige assumed his leadership role in Scientology, there have been numerous accounts of illegal and unethical practices by the Church and by Miscavige himself. A 1991 Time magazine cover story, "The Thriving Cult of Greed and Power," described Miscavige as "ringleader" of a "hugely profitable global racket that survives by intimidating members and critics in a Mafia-like manner." Miscavige stated in a 1992 interview on Nightline—his only live televised interview to date—that the publication of the article resulted from a request by Eli Lilly, because of "the damage we had caused to their killer drug Prozac". Scientology filed a suit against Eli Lilly, J. Walter Thompson, Hill & Knowlton and the WPP Group. Scientology agreed to settle the case shortly before it went to trial.

The Scientology organization also brought a libel lawsuit against the piece's publisher Time Warner and its author Richard Behar, seeking damages of $416 million. All counts of the suit were dismissed by the court, and the dismissal upheld when Scientology appealed. Similar lawsuits in Switzerland, France, Italy, the Netherlands and Germany were dismissed as groundless.

In 1987, the BBC Panorama program Scientology: The Road to Total Freedom? featured an interview with former member Don Larson, who served as the church's $25-per-week "finance ethics officer" and who described Miscavige's physical violence towards a staff member:

It was about 15 of us. We went out and rented three limos, drove up to an organization in San Francisco and did a practice beat-'em-up kind of meeting, you know. We took the CDB Org—the commanding officer of that org, organization. He got thrown into the filing cabinets, he was sec-checked on the meter and, um, you—that's where you, what, you have to tell the truth. And there's a whole row of people around the guy, right? And he's sitting there hanging onto the cans and—this is nothing to do with religion any more, right? This is, 'Where's the money, Jack? I want the money! Where did you put the money?' And he said, 'I, you—I don't know! I don't have the money.' David Miscavige comes up, grabs him by the tie and starts bashing him into the filing cabinet. And he's thrown out in the street; his tie is ripped off. Um, this is just a warm-up kind of bash.

In a 1995 interview for ITV, Stacy Young, Miscavige's former secretary and the ex-wife of Hubbard's former spokesman, Robert Vaughn Young, asserted that Miscavige emotionally tormented staff members on a regular basis. "His viciousness and his cruelty to staff was unlike anything that I had ever experienced in my life," she said. "He just loved to degrade the staff." Though Miscavige and Scientology have been the subject of much press attention, he has rarely spoken directly to the press. Exceptions include the 1992 interview on Nightline, a 1994 print interview with weekly Austrian news magazine Profil, a 1998 newspaper interview with the St. Petersburg Times, and a 1998 appearance in an A&E Investigative Reports installment called "Inside Scientology."

In the aftermath of the September 11 attacks, David Miscavige published a message to all Scientologists entitled "Wake Up Call", urging them to redouble their efforts to use Scientology. Miscavige asserted that World War II, Hitler, Pearl Harbor, the Cold War, the 9/11 attacks, and "endless world conflicts can be traced to a lack of real technology of the mind and reliance on false mental therapies of psychiatry and psychology." Miscavige declared that Scientology "work[s] to reform the field of mental health" and "we have the technology and organization to overcome any obstacle facing this planet today" and "we have the technology to pull it off."

=== Relationship with the IRS ===
In 1991, Miscavige, together with Marty Rathbun, visited the Internal Revenue Service (IRS) headquarters in Washington, D.C. to arrange a meeting with Commissioner Fred T. Goldberg, Jr. For more than two decades, the IRS had refused to recognize Scientology as a nonprofit charitable organization. Before this meeting, Scientology had filed more than fifty lawsuits against the IRS and, according to The New York Times:

Scientology's lawyers hired private investigators to dig into the private lives of IRS officials and to conduct surveillance operations to uncover potential vulnerabilities... [and] taken documents from an I.R.S. conference and sent them to church officials and created a phony news bureau in Washington to gather information on church critics. The church also financed an organization of I.R.S. whistle-blowers that attacked the agency publicly.

At the meeting with Goldberg, Miscavige offered to cease Scientology's suits against the IRS in exchange for tax exemptions. This led to a two-year negotiating process, in which IRS tax analysts were ordered to ignore the substantive issues because they had been resolved prior to review. In 1992 Scientology was granted recognition as a nonprofit organization in the U.S., which creates a tax exemption for the Church of Scientology International and its subsidiaries, and tax deductions for those who contribute to their programs.

Scientology officials and the IRS later issued a statement that the ruling was based on a two-year inquiry and voluminous documents that, they said, showed the organization was qualified for the exemptions. To announce the settlement with the IRS, Miscavige gathered a reported 10,000 members of Scientology in the Los Angeles Memorial Sports Arena, where he delivered a two-and-a-half-hour address and proclaimed, "The war is over!" The crowd gave Miscavige an ovation that lasted more than ten minutes.

=== Church of Scientology initiatives ===
According to Scientology, Miscavige initiated a long-term project of issuing unreleased and corrected editions of Hubbard's books and restoring Hubbard's lectures, including translating many works into other languages. Another initiative by Miscavige, launched in 2003, is to build new or remodeled Scientology locations, called "Ideal Orgs," in every major city worldwide. Since then, over seventy new or remodeled locations have been opened, including facilities in Washington, D.C., Madrid, New York City, London, Berlin, Mexico City, Rome, Tel Aviv, Atlanta, Miami, and San Diego. Until the late 2010s, Miscavige worked primarily from Scientology's Gold Base near Hemet, California.

==== Flag Building ====
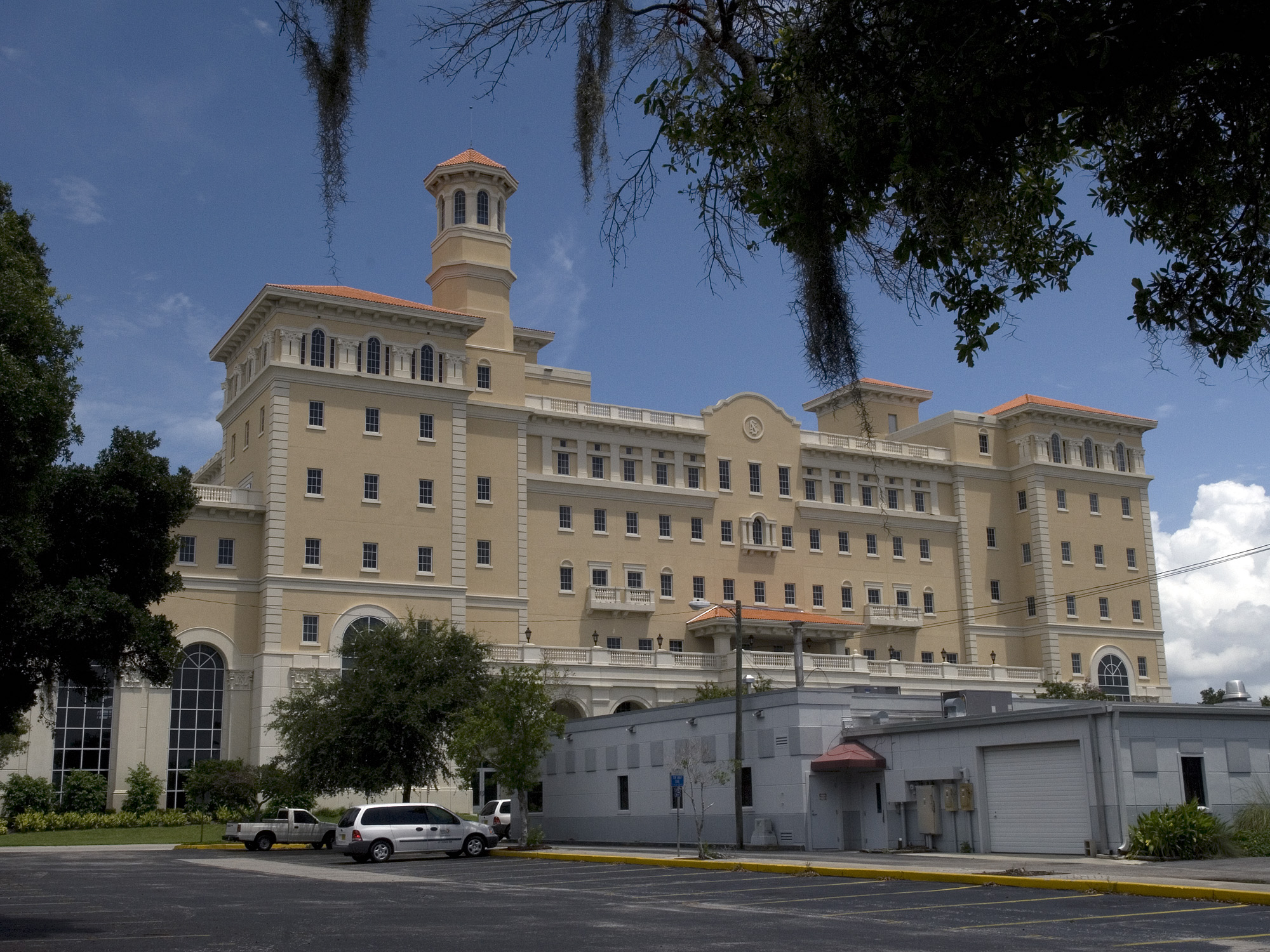
The Flag Building in Clearwater, Florida, is one of Miscavige's flagship projects. The building contains a Sea Org museum and training facilities.

One of the largest projects of Miscavige's career is the Flag Building, originally called the "Super Power Building," which is described as the spiritual headquarters of Scientology. The largest of Scientology's properties in Clearwater, Florida, the 377,000-square-foot (35,000 m^{2}) structure is reportedly outfitted with custom-built equipment designed to administer the supposedly perception-enhancing "Super Power Rundown" to high-level Scientologists. The building was scheduled for completion in 2003, but underwent ten years of delays and re-designs as Scientology completed two other major construction and restoration projects in the same area ahead of it, the Fort Harrison Hotel and the Oak Cove Hotel. Miscavige inaugurated the Flag Building on November 17, 2013. He reportedly took up permanent residence at the Flag Building in the late-2010s.

== 2009–present: criminal investigation and lawsuits ==
In 2009, the St. Petersburg Times published a series titled "The Truth Rundown," which featured allegations by former Scientology executives that Miscavige had repeatedly humiliated and physically beaten his staff, and had confined Scientologists in degrading conditions in a building at Gold Base known as "The Hole." The series included interviews with Mike Rinder, former spokesperson for Scientology and director of the organization's Office of Special Affairs, and Mark Rathbun, the former Inspector General of the RTC. Rinder has said that he was physically assaulted by Miscavige on about fifty occasions. These allegations have been supported by other former Scientologists. Lawrence Wright, author of Going Clear: Scientology, Hollywood, and the Prison of Belief, interviewed twelve individuals who reported having been personally attacked by Miscavige and twenty-one people who say they witnessed such attacks. Scientology denies all of these reports.

"The Truth Rundown" was recognized with journalistic honors, including the 2010 Gold Medal for Public Service award from the Florida Society of News Editors. The series was cited as a basis for subsequent journalistic investigations, including a weeklong series hosted on CNN by Anderson Cooper. Jeff Hawkins, a former marketing guru for Scientology, reported attending a meeting where Miscavige "jumped up on the conference room table, like with his feet right on the conference room table, launched himself across the table at me – I was standing – battered my face, and then shoved me down on the floor." Amy Scobee, another ex-Scientologist, corroborated Hawkins' account.

Scientology representatives have consistently denied abuse by Miscavige, insisting that the allegations come from apostates motivated by bitterness or attempting to extort money from the organization. Hawkins' claims were responded to by Scientology when he reiterated them in a documentary, saying they were "fabricated" and referring to him as "a discredited anti-Scientology media source." Scientology executive David Bloomberg said that it was Hawkins who attacked Miscavige. Miscavige sent an open letter to the newspaper challenging the integrity of the reporters and labeling their sources as "lying," after the persons in question had been removed from the Scientology organization for what Miscavige described as "fundamental crimes against the Scientology religion." Scientology also commissioned an independent review of the Times' reporting, but has not, to date, released those findings.

Miscavige is portrayed within Scientology as "a servant of Hubbard's message, not an agent in his own right." Official Scientology websites describe him as Hubbard's "trusted friend." Miscavige uses Scientology publications as well as professionally produced videos of gala events, at which he acts as master of ceremonies, to communicate with Scientologists worldwide. According to the organization, as the RTC's chairman of the board his primary task is to "preserve, maintain and protect" the Scientology organization. In 2012, Miscavige opened Scientology's "National Affairs Office" in Washington, D.C., which he declared to be, "an office designed to give back to a United States government that steadfastly guaranteed our religious rights, the very freedom that allows us to do what we are doing today." Scientology says the National Affairs Office was built "to oversee programs around the country and the world dealing with human rights, drug addiction, literacy and disaster response."

=== FBI investigation ===
In his role as the leader of Scientology, Miscavige has been the subject of law enforcement investigations, including by the Federal Bureau of Investigation (FBI), into suspected human trafficking and slavery. He is also the subject of ongoing lawsuits involving child abuse, human trafficking and forced labor. Miscavige was investigated as part of wide-ranging investigation into Scientology by the FBI in 2009 and 2010, which focused particularly on criminal activities at Gold Base, against which the FBI had planned a raid before the investigation was discontinued.

=== Scientology Network ===
Scientology launched the Scientology Network, a DIRECTV broadcast and OTT streaming service, on March 12, 2018, with Miscavige introducing its inaugural broadcast in a rare on-camera appearance. The network is produced by Scientology Media Productions in Los Angeles, a facility opened by the organization in May 2016. Addressing the crowd at the SMP opening, Miscavige called the channel "our uncorrupted communication line to the billions. Because as the saying goes, if you don't write your own story, someone else will."

=== Abuse lawsuits ===
In 2019, a then-unnamed female individual, who was raised as a Scientologist and joined the Sea Org as Miscavige's steward at age 15, filed suit against Miscavige and Scientology. The lawsuit also alleged kidnapping, stalking, libel, slander, constructive invasion of privacy and intentional infliction of emotional distress. Lawyers for Scientology convinced a judge to move the case to internal church arbitration in January 2020. Miscavige is named in a lawsuit involving a series of rapes by Scientologist Danny Masterson, and subsequent efforts by the Scientology organization to harass Masterson's victims. Scientology's lawyers had tried to force the case into internal church arbitration, similar to the case in 2020, but this failed following a three-judge ruling in January 2022.

Three former Scientology workers filed a lawsuit for human trafficking, and peonage of children as young as six years old, against Miscavige and Scientology in April 2022. The lawsuit also alleges repeated sexual assault of children by senior members of the Sea Org, of which Miscavige was leader at the time and remains so to the present. The court overseeing the case was told by counsel for the plaintiffs that Miscavige was evading service in the case over a period of months, with at least fourteen attempts being made to serve the summons. The evasion included Miscavige ordering the security team at his house to prevent the summons from being delivered. The court found the allegations sufficiently credible that it ordered that Miscavige be served through the office of the Secretary of State of Florida. In February 2023, the U.S. District Court for the Middle District of Florida ruled that Miscavige had been properly served via substituted service through the Florida Secretary of State, after plaintiffs demonstrated extensive attempts to serve him personally.

== Personal life ==
=== Marriage ===
Miscavige is married to fellow Sea Org member Michele Diane "Shelly" Miscavige, who has not been seen in public since August 2007 when she was spotted being escorted to her father's funeral. Multiple sources have alleged she disappeared from Gold Base shortly after she "filled several job vacancies without her husband's permission." In July 2012, responding to press speculation on Shelly's whereabouts, lawyers who said they represented her informed two UK newspapers that "she is not missing and devotes her time to the work of the Church of Scientology."

In 2013, the Los Angeles Times reported that the Los Angeles Police Department (LAPD) had closed their investigation following a missing persons report filed by former Scientologist and actress Leah Remini, having "located and spoke[n]" to Shelly Miscavige. The LAPD declined to answer questions about the details of the report. Author Lawrence Wright reports that "former Sea Org members" claim that they believe Shelly Miscavige is being held against her will at the compound of the Scientologist's Church of Spiritual Technology corporation near the mountain town of Running Springs in San Bernardino County.

=== Family and relatives ===
In 2012, after gaining access to the full Internet via Kindle, Ron Miscavige discovered new information about the church and subsequently left the Church of Scientology. The Los Angeles Times reported that he was put under surveillance by the Church, which was said to have paid two private investigators to watch him around the clock for 18 months for $10,000 a week. The surveillance was said to have been "all because [David] Miscavige feared that his father would divulge too much about the organisation's activities." At one point, the investigators were said to have phoned David Miscavige when they thought his father was having a heart attack and were allegedly told not to intervene: "If it was Ron's time to die, to let him die and not intervene in any way." David Miscavige denied having ordered the surveillance or speaking to one of the investigators. Subsequently, Ron published a book in 2016, titled Ruthless: Scientology, My Son David Miscavige, and Me.

Thomas Tobin of the Tampa Bay Times reviewed the book, writing that the author "describ[es] his son as a tyrant who has turned the organization into a destructive influence." Tobin wrote that Ron Miscavige said the church had "morphed into an immoral organization that hides a long list of abuses behind First Amendment protections, spends millions to investigate and harass its critics, and has destroyed families—including his own—through its practice of disconnection."

Ronald "Ronnie" Miscavige Jr., David Miscavige's older brother by seven years, served in CMO in the Sea Org for a time, but left Scientology in 2000. Jenna Miscavige Hill, Ronnie Miscavige's daughter and David Miscavige's niece, remained in the Sea Org until 2005; she subsequently became an outspoken critic of Scientology and published a book in 2013 titled Beyond Belief: My Secret Life Inside Scientology And My Harrowing Escape. Denise Licciardi, Miscavige's twin sister, was hired by major Scientology donor Bryan Zwan as a top executive for the Clearwater-based company Digital Lightwave, where she was linked to an accounting scandal.

Shelly Miscavige's mother, Mary Florence "Flo" Fike Barnett, was a long-time Scientologist who later resigned, taking with her copies of "confidential upper-level materials." She joined David Mayo's Advanced Ability Center, an independent Scientology organization considered heterodox by the Church of Scientology. According to testimony by former high-ranking church executive Vicki Aznaran: "The fact that David Miscavige was linked to [Barnett] by familial ties was extremely repugnant to him and to his wife." On September 8, 1985, Barnett was found dead at age 52 from a shot to the head from a Ruger 10/22 rifle.

The body also had three rifle shot wounds to the chest (one surface wound, one through a breast implant, and one that passed through the left lung and fractured a rib), and there were superficial slash marks on her wrists that were identified in the autopsy report as possibly having been several days old. Despite the admittedly "very, very, very unusual" circumstances of multiple gunshot wounds and the unwieldy nature of the weapon, her death was ruled as consistent with suicide. David Miscavige strongly denied any part in his mother-in-law's death in an affidavit on the case, calling it a "personal tragedy in my family's life." However, in the presence of other witnesses he was reported to exclaim: "That bitch got what she deserved."

Miscavige family tree

Loretta Gidaro
Ron Miscavige Jnr.
Jenna Miscavige Hill

Ron Miscavige Snr. | Becky Bigelow | Flo Barnett
Denise Gentile | David Miscavige | Shelly Miscavige

=== Friendship with Tom Cruise ===
Miscavige is a close friend of actor Tom Cruise and served as best man at Cruise's wedding to Katie Holmes. Cruise was converted to Scientology by his first wife Mimi Rogers in 1986, becoming an outspoken advocate for the Church of Scientology in the 2000s. Around the same time Cruise was beginning his relationship with Rogers, Miscavige made an announcement at a Church of Scientology rally, "The most important recruit ever is in the process of being secured. His arrival will change the face of Scientology forever."

His involvement in the organization was leaked by the tabloid Star in 1990, and he publicly admitted to following Scientology in a 1992 interview with Barbara Walters. According to the book Inside Scientology: The Story of America's Most Secretive Religion by Janet Reitman, seven years after Cruise started studying Scientology, the organization's leaders promised to share Scientology secrets, such as the story of the extraterrestrial ruler Xenu. According to Reitman's book, Cruise "freaked out" and took a step back. He removed himself from the Church and worked on the film Eyes Wide Shut until 1999 when Miscavige sent Marty Rathbun to successfully "retrieve" Cruise and convince him to continue training.

Lawrence Wright's 2013 book Going Clear: Scientology and the Prison of Belief and Alex Gibney's 2015 television documentary adaptation of the same name cast a spotlight on Cruise's role in Scientology. The book and the film both allege that the Scientology organization groomed romantic partners for Cruise and that Cruise used Sea Org and Rehabilitation Project Force workers as a source of free labor. In the film, Cruise's former auditor Marty Rathbun claims that second wife Nicole Kidman was wiretapped on Cruise's suggestion, which Cruise's lawyer denies. Cruise's ex-girlfriend Nazanin Boniadi later compared the Scientology organization's auditioning of women to date Cruise and experiences with him to "white slavery."

== See also ==
- Ruthless: Scientology, My Son David Miscavige, and Me – book by Miscavige's father
- Beyond Belief (memoir) – book by Miscavige's niece
- Scientology officials – Staff hierarchy, practices, personnel of Scientology network
- My Scientology Movie – 2015 British documentary film by John Dower
