= List of Scientology security checks =

Scientology confessionals

In Scientology, the security check (or sec check) is an interrogation technique put into practice by founder L. Ron Hubbard in 1960. It involves an "Ethics officer" probing the thoughts, attitudes and behavior of an individual member by asking them large numbers of questions. The bulk of the questions deal with criminal or sexual activity or intentions, or other things that the interviewee might be ashamed of, and probe negative thoughts that the person might have about Scientology or Hubbard. As with "auditing", the person holds the electrodes of the E-meter, a pseudoscientific device that measures electrical conductivity in the human body, while they are given a series of highly probing, personal questions.

Sec checks are also known within the Church of Scientology as "Integrity Processing" or "Confessional Auditing".

== Description ==
A security check is sometimes compared to the practice of confession in other religions, however with its guided questions a sec check is closer to an interrogation than it is to the free-form unburdening of voluntary repentance.

Hubbard described security checking as a remedy for "the compulsion or obsession to commit actions" the person feels must be kept secret. Sec checks are performed on every Scientologist on the Bridge to Total Freedom, and every six months for those on the OT VII level "to make sure they're using the tech correctly", and on staff members who wish to leave staff.

Susan Raine observes that the questions asked in security checks show that L. Ron Hubbard was intensely preoccupied with scrutiny, surveillance and betrayal. She notes that this intense form of surveillance makes sense from a bureaucratic perspective as a way of making sure all individuals follow (and internalize) the organisational goals. Bent Corydon compares security checking to the use of thought police in the novel Nineteen Eighty-Four. He writes that Scientologists are punished for having negative thoughts about Hubbard or Scientology and so learn to think only positively. David Mayo reported that sec checks included the question, "Have you ever had any unkind thoughts about LRH?" and that such "discreditable thoughts" could land a follower in trouble.

Jon Atack writes that sec checks could be applied either as a "confidential" confessional or as a non-confidential investigation. He alleges that former members have been silenced by the fear that their "confidential" secrets will be used in blackmail against them.

In response to public outrage towards Scientology and increasing government investigations into its practices, head of Public Relations Bureau of the Guardian's Office David Gaiman issued in 1968 a "Code of Reform" announcing the cancellation of the practices of disconnection, declaring people fair game, security checking as a form of confession, and a prohibition of writing down confessional materials. The PR move was to assure the press and governments that a severe puritanical and punitive approach was no longer necessary and so Scientology was taking a new liberal attitude. However, it changed nothing for practices in the organization. Later Scientology documents refer to the practice, and former members report that it still continues.

In 1972, the South African Commission of Enquiry published a report on Scientology. It recommended that there should be legislation against sec checks. However, no legislative action was taken as a result.

== Examples ==
=== Pre-processing security check ===
This check is given to every person applying to start auditing for the first time.

- Are you a pervert?
- Are you guilty of any major crimes in this lifetime?
- Have you been sent here knowingly to injure Scientology?
- Are you or have you ever been a Communist?
- Are you closely affiliated to any person or organization violently opposed to L. Ron Hubbard or Scientology?

=== Johannesburg security check ===
The Johannesburg (also known as "Joburg" or "Jo'burg") Security Check was described by Hubbard as "the roughest security check in Scientology". An amended form continued to be used for some time thereafter. Amongst Hubbard's list of primarily crime-related questions is the question "Have you ever slept with a member of a race of another color?" Other questions include:

- Have you ever embezzled money?
- Have you ever been a drug addict?
- Have you ever bombed anything?
- Have you ever murdered anyone?
- Have you ever raped anyone?
- Have you ever had anything to do with a baby farm?

=== Only Valid security check ===
The contents of the Joburg security check were later revised into what became "The Only Valid Security Check". Added to the Sec Check are new questions such as:

- Do you collect sexual objects?
- Do you have a secret you are afraid I'll find out?
- Are you upset by this security check?
- Have you ever had unkind thoughts about L. Ron Hubbard?

=== Auditor's sec check ===
This sec check, comprising 170 questions, was meant for staff auditors and field auditors.

- Do you hope you won't be found out?
- Do you think there is anything wrong with having your privacy invaded?
- What do you wish you hadn't done?
- Are you upset by this security check?

=== Children's security check ===
Designed to be applied to children aged 6 to 12, it includes 100 questions, such as:

- What has somebody told you not to tell?
- Have you ever decided you didn't like some member of your family?
- Have you ever taken something belonging to somebody else and never given it back?
- Have you ever pretended to be sick (ill)?
- Have you ever made yourself sick (ill) or hurt yourself to make somebody sorry?

=== Whole Track security check ===
This long Sec Check, consisting of hundreds of questions, takes stock of the subject's entire time track, including their "recollections" of any "past lives" they believe they have had. It includes questions such as:

- Did you come to Earth for evil purposes?
- Have you ever smothered a baby?
- Have you ever enslaved a population?
- Have you ever destroyed a culture?
- Have you ever torn out someone's tongue?
- Have you ever zapped anyone?
- Have you ever eaten a human body?
- Have you ever made a planet, or nation, radioactive?
