= Advanced Ability Center =

David Mayo's Scientology spinoff

- Formation: 1983
- Headquarters: United States

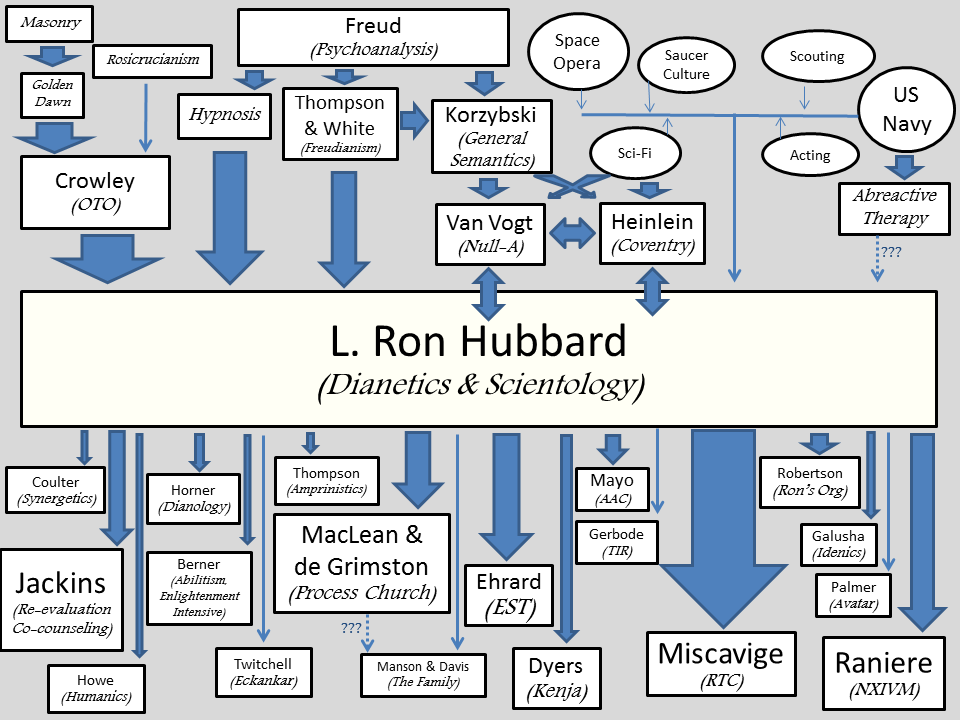
The arrows in the lower row point to the numerous offshoots, splinter groups, and new movements influenced by L. Ron Hubbard. The AAC is among these.

The Advanced Ability Center was a breakaway organization from the Church of Scientology established by former Scientologist David Mayo after he left the Church in February 1983, a time when most of Scientology's upper and middle management was removed following the formation of the Religious Technology Center (RTC) and RTC head David Miscavige's restructuring of the church. David Mayo had been Hubbard's own auditor. The Advanced Ability Center later became the Theta International movement and was also known as the Church of the New Civilization.

Mayo taught material from the upper part of The Bridge of the Scientology organization in the Advanced Ability Center. A division of the Advanced Ability Center was closed down again in 1984 under pressure from the main organization. According to Perspectives on the New Age edited by James R. Lewis and J. Gordon Melton and published in 1992, the Advanced Ability Center formed in Milan was in competition with the Scientology organization in Italy.

== David Mayo ==
Mayo joined Scientology in 1957 as a staff member, and joined the Sea Org in 1968. He trained with L. Ron Hubbard up to the level of Class XII auditor and worked with Hubbard on the OT levels 5 to 7. Mayo had been L. Ron Hubbard's auditor and rose to the position of Senior Case Supervisor International in the Church of Scientology. He was ousted during David Miscavige's struggle for power, declared suppressive and sentenced to the "running program" (physical punishment) in 1982. Mayo escaped and founded the Advanced Ability Center. Religious Technology Center sued Mayo in Los Angeles federal court claiming intellectual property infringement, filed a RICO suit, and started an extensive harassment campaign against him and AAC. Mayo countersued, and RTC was sanctioned millions of dollars. In 1985, Scientology successfully enjoined Mayo from selling Scientology services and AAC was bankrupted and closed by 1986.

== See also ==
- Free Zone (Scientology)
