= Sea Org =

Fraternal order of Scientology

- Sea Organization
- Formation: 1967
- Founder: L. Ron Hubbard (Commodore)
- Headquarters: Gold Base, California (Church of Scientology headquarters)
- Location(s): Los Angeles; Clearwater, Florida; London; Saint Hill Manor; Copenhagen; and on the Freewinds
- Leader: David Miscavige (Captain)
- Publication: High Winds
- Parent organization: Church of Scientology
- Formerly called: Sea Project

The Sea Organization or Sea Org is the senior-most status of staff within the Church of Scientology network of corporations, but it is not itself incorporated. In the 1960s and 1970s, the Sea Org was started as L. Ron Hubbard's private navy (Note: Scholars describe the early Sea Org as Hubbard's "private navy" because it operated from a fleet of ships and adopted naval-style ranks, uniforms, and shipboard discipline. The term reflects the organization's maritime setting and symbolic structure, not a military function; the Sea Org did not possess weapons, combat roles, or the characteristics of an armed force.) and adopted naval uniforms and ranks. Today, all Scientology management organizations are exclusively staffed with Sea Org members. The Sea Org maintains strict codes for its members, beginning with a billion-year pledge of service to Scientology upon initiation. David Miscavige, the leader of Scientology, is the highest-ranking Sea Org officer, with the rank of captain. The higher rank of commodore is permanently reserved for the reincarnation of the late L. Ron Hubbard, founder of Scientology. Some ex-members and scholars have described the Sea Org as a totalitarian organization marked by intensive surveillance, lack of freedom, forced labor, and punishments.

In a 1992 memorandum by the Church of Scientology International, the following information was provided to the Internal Revenue Service with regard to the nature of the Sea Org:

[The Sea Org] does not have an ecclesiastical organizing board or command channels chart or secular existence such as an incorporated or unincorporated association. [...] Although there is no such "organization" as the Sea Organization, the term Sea Org has a colloquial usage which implies that there is. There are general recruitment posters and literature for "The Sea Org" which implies that people will be employed by the Sea Org when in reality they will join, making the billion year commitment, at some church that is staffed by Sea Org members and become employees of that church corporation. [...] The Sea Org exists as a spiritual commitment that is factually beyond the full understanding of the [Internal Revenue] Service or any other but a trained and audited Scientologist.

== History ==
The Sea Org was established on August 12, 1967, by L. Ron Hubbard, the founder of Dianetics and Scientology, initially aboard three ships, the Avon River, the Enchanter, and HMS Royal Scotsman. Hubbard later rechristened the three vessels the Diana, the Athena, and the Apollo. The Apollo served as the flagship, or simply called "Flag", and Hubbard was referred to as Commodore.

In 1971, the Sea Org assumed responsibility for the delivery of the upper levels of its auditing and training, known as the Operating Thetan or "OT" levels. In 1981, under the aegis of the Commodore's Messenger Organization led by David Miscavige, Sea Org members dissolved the Guardian's Office (GO) and assumed full responsibility for the church's international management, later reassigning the GO's duties to the Office of Special Affairs in 1983 during the corporate restructuring of the Church.

It moved to land-based organizations in 1975, though maritime customs persist, with many members wearing naval-style uniforms and addressing both male and female officers as "sir". In 1985, the church purchased a 440-foot (130 m) motor vessel, the Freewinds, which docks in Curaçao in the southern Caribbean and is used as a religious retreat and training center, staffed entirely by Sea Org members. Sea Org members make a lifetime commitment to Scientology by signing a billion-year contract officially described as a symbolic pledge. In exchange, they are given free room and board, as well as a small weekly allowance. Sea Org members agree to strict codes of discipline, such as disavowing premarital sex, working long hours (on average at least 100 hours per week) and living in communal housing called berthing. They are allowed to marry, but must leave the Sea Org if they have or want to raise children.

== Background ==
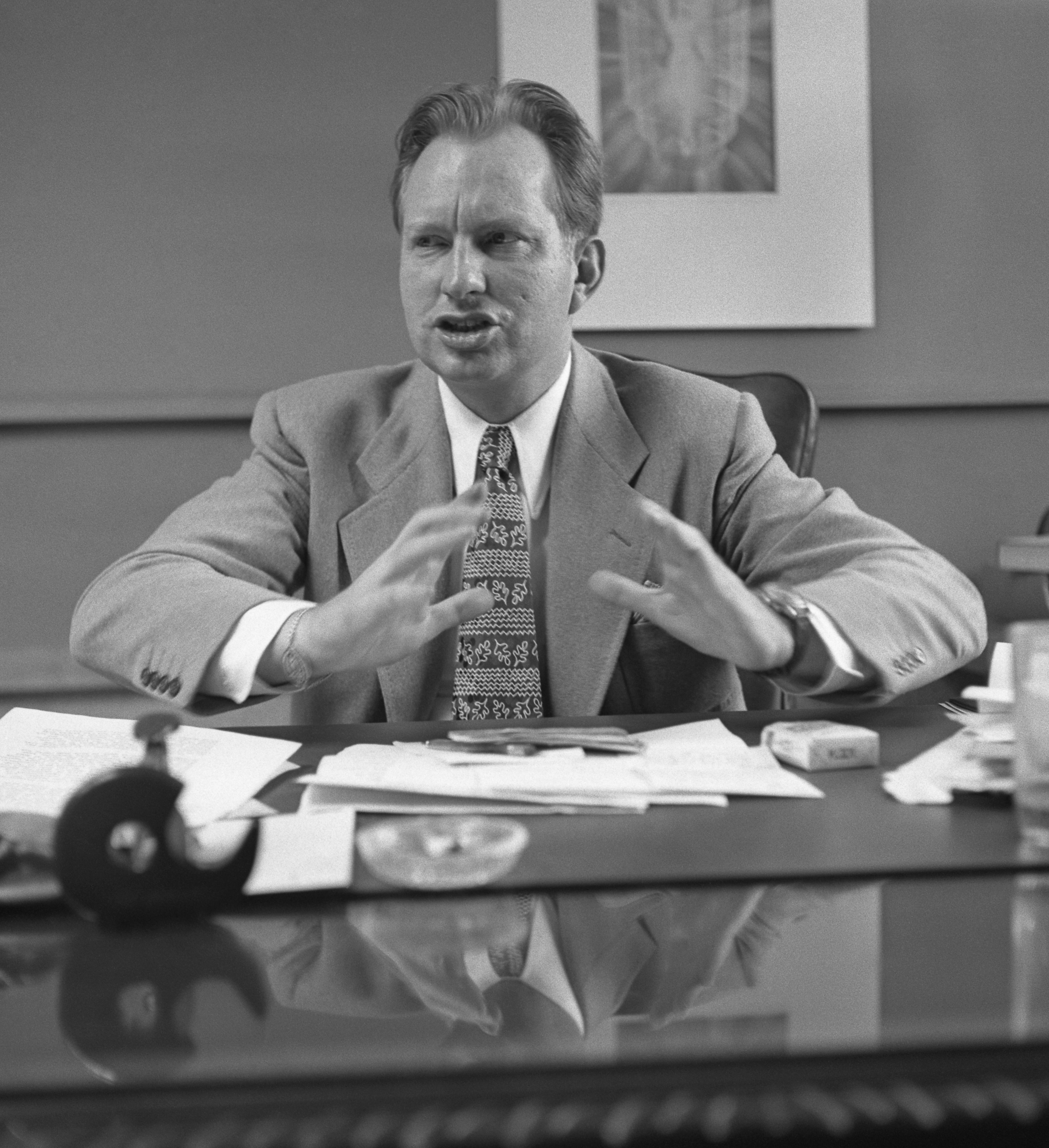
L. Ron Hubbard founded the Church of Scientology in 1953 and the Sea Org in 1967.

According to Hubbard, much of the galaxy, including Earth (known as "Teegeeack"), was ruled tens of millions of years ago by the Galactic Confederacy. The confederacy was controlled by Xenu, a tyrant who was eventually overthrown by a group within the Galactic Confederacy known as the "Loyal Officers". Religious scholar Hugh Urban writes that the Sea Org is modeled after these Loyal Officers. Urban also describes the Sea Org, with the naval uniforms and ranks, as an idealized re-creation of Hubbard's own World War II military career. He says the Sea Org is reminiscent of the "Soldiers of Light" in Hubbard's science fiction story collection Ole Doc Methuselah. The publicized goal of the Sea Org is to "get ethics in on the planet".

Academic Stephen A. Kent has argued that at least part of the reason for the establishment of the Sea Org was that the Church of Scientology's practices encountered resistance from the American Food and Drug Administration and the Internal Revenue Service, as well as from the governments of the United Kingdom, Australia, and Rhodesia. Sailing on the high seas meant the church could escape their attention.

In 2000, the number of Sea Org members was listed at around 5,800. Most Sea Org members reside in church complexes in Los Angeles, Clearwater, Copenhagen, London, Saint Hill Manor, and Sydney, with some at smaller centers or on assignment elsewhere. According to reports filed with the Australian Charities and Not-for-profits Commission in 2022, the Church of Scientology Religious Education College Incorporated, Scientology's UK arm, claimed to have a total of 700 "volunteers" (including Sea Org) across Saint Hill, London, Manchester, Birmingham and other UK organizations.

According to scholar Susan Raine, Hubbard created the Sea Org as a "kind of space navy, melding [sci-fi] space ideas with Earthbound naval ones." Hubbard biographer Jon Atack recalled a confidential Sea Org executive directive that claimed that governments of the world were on the verge of collapse: "The Sea Org would survive and pick up the pieces."

== Structure ==
Sea Org Day is August 12, when ceremonies are held to commemorate the achievements and contributions of Sea Org members, and when rank and promotion ceremonies take place.

High Winds is the periodical magazine of the Sea Org. The first issue was released on Sea Org Day 1980.

=== Estates Project Force ===
New recruits undergo a training regimen, informally called a boot camp. During this phase, known as the Estates Project Force (EPF), recruits are not considered full Sea Org members. They are required to address all members as "sir", regardless of rank or sex, and must run everywhere instead of walking. Married couples are separated for the duration of the EPF and not allowed to have private or intimate contact with each other.

While on the EPF, recruits are assigned an intensive daily regimen divided between five hours of manual labor and five hours of study and indoctrination known as "Product Zero". Scientology courses required to complete the EPF include:

- Basic Study Manual, an introductory course in Study Technology, a simplified version of the Student Hat course.
- Introduction to Scientology Ethics, a basic course in Scientology ethics and justice.
- Basic Sea Org Member Hat, a course on the basics of membership in the Sea Org and what is expected.
- Welcome to the Sea Org, a series of taped lectures Hubbard originally gave new recruits in October 1969.
- Personal Grooming Course, a course on personal hygiene.

The courses are self-paced rather than organized into classes, so recruits graduate individually, not as a group. Each recruit graduates once all required courses have been completed and they have passed a "7A Security Check" and been approved by a "Fitness Board". They may then join the Sea Org as full members.

=== Code of a Sea Org member ===
Sea Org recruits verbally agree to an 18-point pledge as part of a swearing in ceremony. Members formally reaffirm their acceptance of this code annually on Sea Org Day, August 12, the anniversary of the day the Sea Org was founded. The Code of a Sea Org Member includes such promises as:

1. I promise to help get ethics in on this planet and the universe, which is the basic purpose of the Sea Org.
2. I promise to uphold, forward and carry out Command Intention.
5. I promise to uphold the fact that duty is the Sea Org member's true motivation, which is the highest motivation there is.
12. I promise to be competent and effective at all times and never try to explain away or justify ineffectiveness nor minimize the true power that I am.
18. I promise to make things go right and to persist until they do.

=== Billion-year commitment ===
According to Hubbard, the Sea Org's mission is "an exploration into both time and space". Sea Org members act as goodwill representatives and administrators of Scientology; all policy and administrative posts in the church's key organizations are held by Sea Org members. Sea Org are housed in communal housing called berthing, and receive a basic allowance of about $50 per week.

In accordance with Scientology beliefs, members are expected to return to the Sea Org when they are reborn; the Sea Org's motto is Revenimus ("We Come Back"). Members must therefore sign a symbolic billion-year commitment, pledging to "get ethics in on this planet and the universe". The church contends that the agreement is not a legally binding contract but merely a symbolic demonstration of the dedication members are expected to give to the organization, and that they are free to leave if they wish. After signing, members report to the Estates Project Force, the Sea Org's induction program; J. Gordon Melton writes that members may take several years between signing the commitment and attending the induction. Once induction is completed, the final decision to join is made.

Members who leave the Sea Org are issued a "freeloader's bill", retroactively billing them for any auditing or training they received. Although the bill is not legally enforceable, these Scientologists may not receive services at any Scientology organization until they pay it and perform an amends program.

=== Marriage and family ===
From the early 1970s to the start of the 21st century, Sea Org members' children were often placed in the Cadet Org. Sea Org members may marry one another but are not permitted to marry outside the organization; extramarital sex is also prohibited. Couples with children must leave the Sea Org and return to other staff positions within the church until the child is six years old; thereafter the children are raised communally and allowed to visit their parents in the Sea Org on weekends or about an hour a day. Stephen A. Kent described that for adult Sea Org members with minor children, their work obligations took priority, damaged parent-child relations, and has led to cases of severe child neglect and endangerment.

Children of members have themselves joined the Sea Org when they came of age. Several former members have said they were advised (or even forced) to have an abortion to avoid being sent to lower organizations. Scientology presents itself as opposed to abortion and actively speaks out against it in its publications.

=== Ships and land bases ===
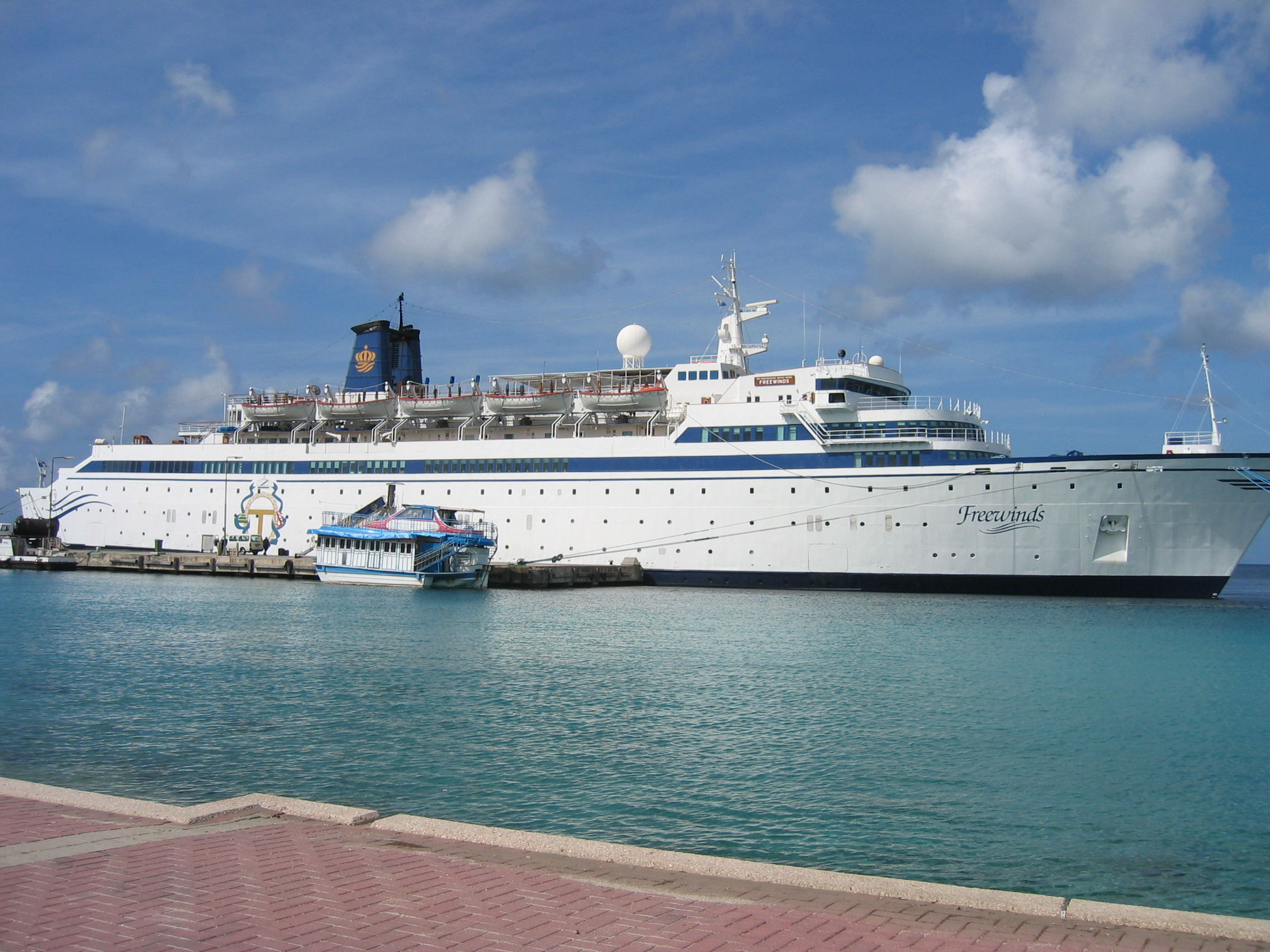
The church's cruise ship, the Freewinds, staffed by Sea Org members

In 1967, the Church of Scientology purchased the 1936-built ferry Royal Scotsman, which it renamed the Apollo, for use as the Sea Org's flagship.

In 1975, the Church sold the Sea Org's ships and moved the organization to land, starting with the Flag Land Base in Clearwater, Florida.

In 1987, the Church purchased the ferry-and-cruise ship La Bohème, which it renamed Freewinds. OT VIII, the highest auditing level of Scientology available, is exclusive to the Freewinds and can only be undertaken there. The ship also hosts various courses, seminars, conventions, and events, including the annual Maiden Voyage celebration.

=== Rehabilitation Project Force ===
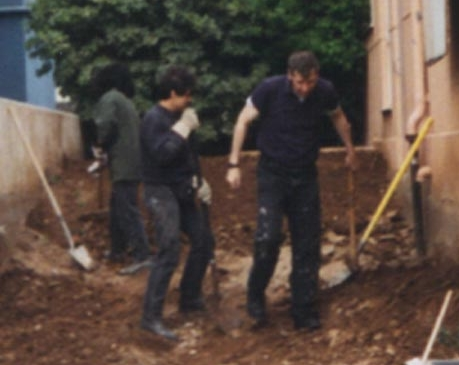
Sea Org members performing manual labor on the Rehabilitation Project Force

The Rehabilitation Project Force (RPF), established in January 1974, is an immersive disciplinary program aimed at isolating and reconditioning members through intensive ideological re-education and labor. Originally it was for Sea Org members who had fallen short of church expectations, failed security checks, or violated certain policies, but it was increasingly used as a form of punishment or a cheap labor pool for construction work. RPF groups operate within Sea Org compounds; while there are no physical locks on the doors, participants are closely watched and their movements controlled. Many ex-Sea Org members have reported grueling work and harsh treatment. On the RPF, one works eight hours of physical work six days a week, such as painting, plumbing, and upkeep of grounds. Members also spend five hours a day studying with a partner.

Former Scientologist Jon Atack argued, in A Piece of Blue Sky (1990), that treatment of Sea Org members in the RPF was a "careful imitation of techniques long-used by the military to obtain unquestioning obedience and immediate compliance to orders, or more simply to break men's spirits". One former member, Gerry Armstrong, said that during his time in the Sea Org in the 1970s he spent over two years banished to the RPF as a punishment. He wrote,

It was essentially a prison to which crew who were considered nonproducers, security risks, or just wanted to leave the Sea Org, were assigned. Hubbard's RPF policies established the conditions. RPF members were segregated and not allowed to communicate to anyone else. They had their own spaces and were not allowed in normal crew areas of the ship. They ate after normal crew had eaten, and only whatever was left over from the crew meal. Their berthing was the worst on board, in a roach-infested, filthy and unventilated cargo hold. They wore black boilersuits, even in the hottest weather. They were required to run everywhere. Discipline was harsh and bizarre, with running laps of the ship assigned for the slightest infraction like failing to address a senior with "Sir". Work was hard and the schedule rigid with seven hours' sleep time from lights out to lights on, short meal breaks, no liberties and no free time ...

When one young woman ordered into the RPF took the assignment too lightly, Hubbard created the RPF's RPF and assigned her to it, an even more degrading experience, cut off even from the RPF, kept under guard, forced to clean the ship's bilges, and allowed even less sleep.

— Jon Atack in A Piece of Blue Sky

=== Uniforms ===
Sea Org uniforms and titles were borrowed from naval practice, reflecting Hubbard's own World War II service in the US Navy. Early Sea Org uniforms were a hodgepodge of styles, including: peaked hats with scrambled eggs; miniskirts, hotpants, halter tops, kepis, and capes; and bikini tops and high-heeled boots.

Before leaving the sea and relocating to land, uniforms adopted a more formal style, called "Class A", which included navy-style caps, gold braid, service ribbons, and epaulets. Other occasional accessories include daggers on belts, and swords being carried.

By 1996 the Sea Org replaced the day-to-day uniforms with a more civilian looking uniform. Today, Class A uniforms are usually only seen during ceremonies, in promotional material, or worn by missionaires. In the 1970s, Celebrity Centre staff didn't wear uniforms, to appeal to artist types, and later adopted customized civilian uniforms "to mingle with movie stars".

Class A uniform shoulder boards and service stripes

Commodore

Captain

Commander

Lieutenant commander

Lieutenant

Lieutenant Junior Grade

Ensign

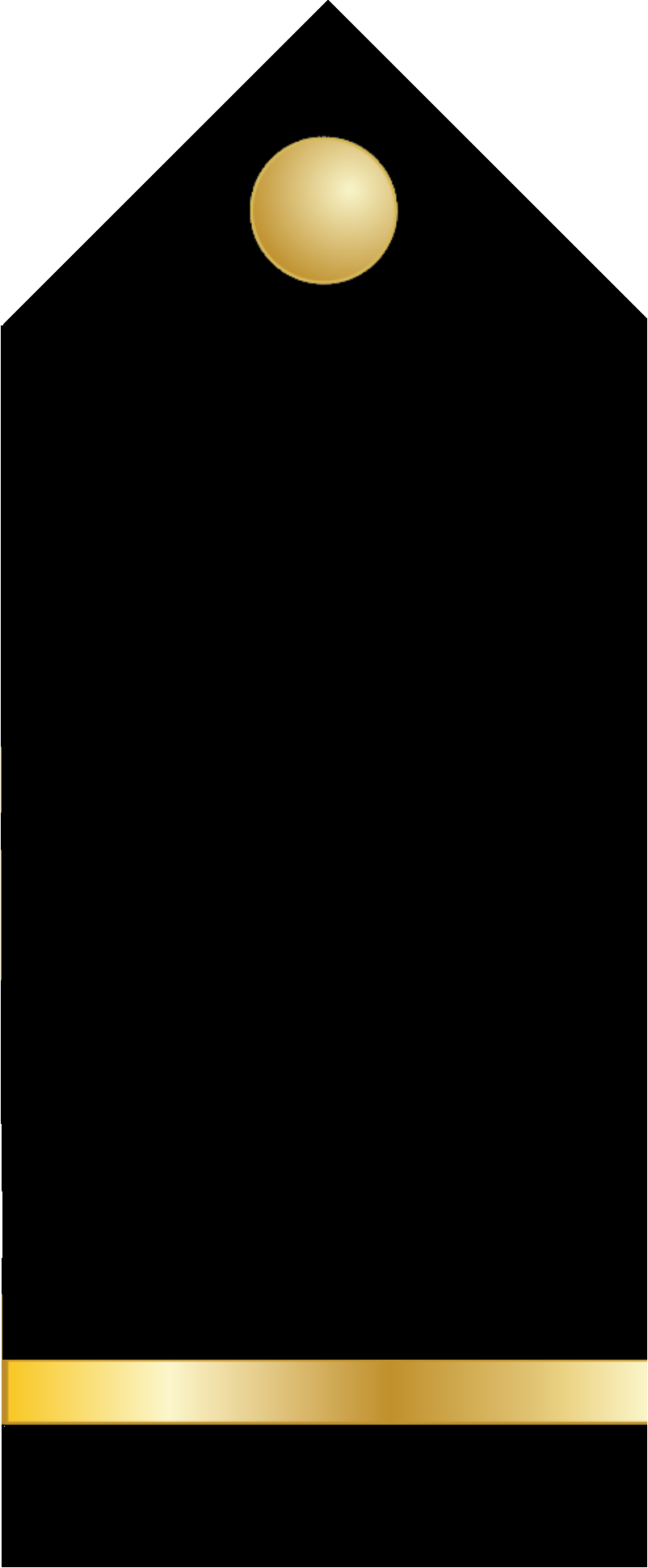
Warrant officer

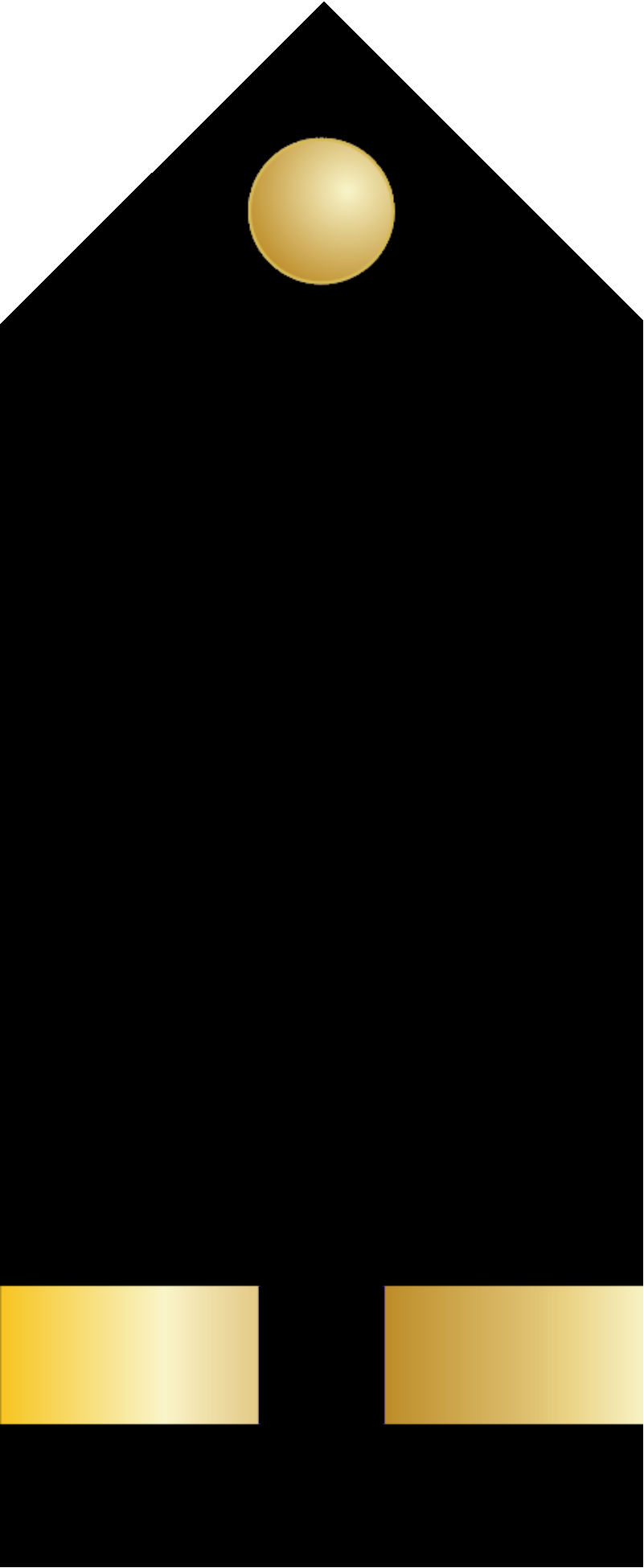
Midshipman

Chief petty officer

Petty officer first class

Petty officer second class

Petty officer third class

== Abuses ==
Critics of Scientology have spoken out against the disciplinary procedures and policies of the Sea Org, which have been a source of controversy since its inception and variously described as abusive and illegal. Former Sea Org members have stated that punishments in the late 1960s and early 1970s included confinement in hazardous conditions such as the ship's chain locker.

In 1974, Hubbard established the Rehabilitation Project Force (or RPF), a forced labour and re-education program against reputedly delinquent members of the Sea Org, which involves long days of hard labor, restricted food, and substandard living conditions. Ex-members have reported physical abuse and that members are prevented from leaving with threats and coercion. Children as young as twelve years old have been assigned to the RPF, and there have been reports of children laboring for considerably longer than eight hours a day, and physical and sexual abuse of minors. Jenna Miscavige Hill, niece of David Miscavige and author of Beyond Belief: My Secret Life Inside Scientology and My Harrowing Escape, stated that as a child she often worked 14 hours a day and only got to see her parents once a week, if that.

== Analysis ==
Interview of someone who joined the Sea Org at 16 years old

Several scholars, writers, and former members have compared the Sea Org to a paramilitary group. In Tom Cruise: An Unauthorized Biography (2008), Andrew Morton called it a "fraternal paramilitary organization", and wrote that members are instructed to read The Art of War by Sun Tzu, and On War by Carl von Clausewitz. He wrote that Scientology leader David Miscavige created an elite unit within the Sea Org called the "SEALs", named after the United States Navy SEALs, who receive better lodging, sustenance, and uniforms than other Sea Org members.

Lawrence Wright wrote in The New Yorker in 2011 that the Sea Org used small children drawn from Scientology families for what he described as forced child labor. The article described extremely inhumane conditions, with children spending years in the Sea Org, sequestered from mainstream life.

== Lawsuits ==
There have been several lawsuits filed by former Sea Org members, alleging abuses which include human trafficking, coerced abortions, ongoing mental abuse, forced labor since childhood, repeated sexual assaults, and forced marriage after sexual assaults. For more information, see these cases:

- Headley v. Church of Scientology International
- DeCrescenzo v. Church of Scientology International
- Haney v. Scientology
- Baxter, Baxter, and Paris v. Scientology
- Jane Doe 1 v. Scientology, David Miscavige, and Gavin Potter

== See also ==
- Scientology ethics and justice § Sea Org ethics
- Scientology officials
- List of Scientology organizations
- Fruit of Islam
