= Scientology in the United Kingdom =

Scientology in the United Kingdom is practised mainly within the Church of Scientology and its related groups, which go under names including the Hubbard Academy of Personal Independence and the Dianetics and Scientology Life Improvement Centre. The national headquarters (and former global headquarters) are at Saint Hill Manor near East Grinstead, which was also the home of Scientology creator L. Ron Hubbard for seven years. 1,844 individuals in England and Wales listed themselves as Scientologists in 2021, marking a decline of just under 25% since 2011; half of these respondents listed themselves as living in and around East Grinstead.

The Church (Note: Use of "Church" or "the Church" is a common shortened form of "Church of Scientology"; see The Church (Scientology).) has used covert intelligence gathering, harassment, and smear campaigns against its British opponents, though on a much smaller scale compared to its activities in the United States. It has been recognised as a religion by some British authorities, but is not itself a registered charity. Scientology-connected groups promoting aspects of Hubbard's teaching, including Narconon and the Citizens Commission on Human Rights, have also been active in the UK and have even received charity status in some cases. There have also been groups practising Scientology independently of the Church.

Scientology has received criticism from British courts who called it "pernicious nonsense", "dangerous material", and "immoral and socially obnoxious". It has been described in Parliament as a "socially harmful enterprise" which "indoctrinates children and other vulnerable people" by "ignorantly practising quasi-psychological techniques". The British government's 1971 report into Scientology featured many high-ranking officials deeming it an "evil cult", whilst a secret 1977 report by the Department of Health and Social Security referred to it as a "considerable evil".

== Status ==
=== Number of adherents ===
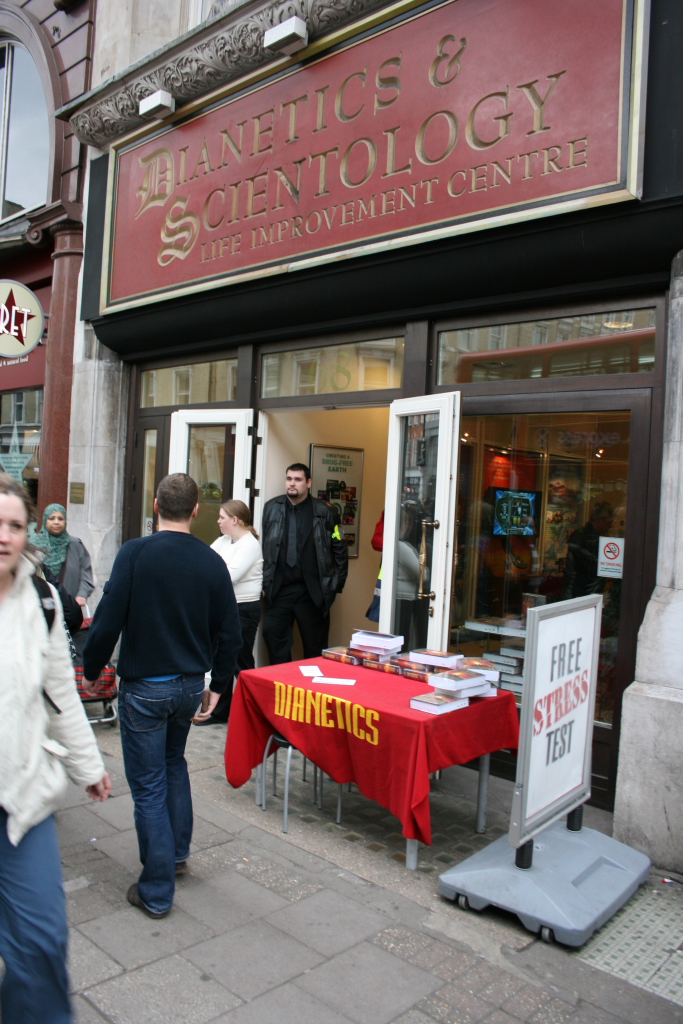
The Church of Scientology branch on London's Tottenham Court Road advertises itself as a "Life Improvement Centre".

The 2011 UK census found that there were 2,418 Scientologists in England and Wales at the time of the survey. For context, this number was roughly half those claiming Zoroastrianism as their religion, and a small fraction of the number of those claiming to be Jedi Knights. The 2021 UK census found there were 1,844 Scientologists in England and Wales, a decline of almost 24% in a decade. Wealden District, in East Sussex, had the most Scientologists, with 402. Wealden District abuts the district with the second-largest population of Scientologists, Mid Sussex in the county of West Sussex, with 368. Mid Sussex hosts the British Scientology Headquarters at Saint Hill Manor, which is in the Mid Sussex town of East Grinstead, in the easternmost part of the district, adjacent to Wealden. These two districts alone account for 42% of all UK Scientologists. The remaining 58% are scattered throughout the country; the next most populous district or borough (Southwark) has only 44 members. Only 5 further boroughs have more than 20: Birmingham (43), Tandridge (26), Bournemouth (25), Newham (22) and Manchester (22). The entire city of London, including all 32 boroughs and the City of London (which has none), has just 258 adherents despite the longstanding presence of a prominent Dianetics centre on Tottenham Court Road.

The Church claims a membership of 118,000 members in the United Kingdom, including 15,000 regular participants, and in the past has claimed as many as 200,000 British members. Given the incongruence of these ostensible figures with the census data, it is likely these claims are merely aggrandising fabrications.

=== Legal status ===
The Church's application for charity status in England and Wales was rejected in 1999, on the grounds that there is no "public benefit arising out of the practice of Scientology". In 2000, however, the Church of Scientology was exempted from UK value added tax on the basis that it was said to be a not-for-profit body. As a result of the decision, Revenue and Customs reportedly had to return several million pounds' worth of past VAT payments to the institution.

While the Church of Scientology itself does not have charitable status, several of its related organisations do, including Greenfields School and Narconon. The governing organisation of Scientology in the UK, Church of Scientology Religious Education College, Inc (COSRECI), is a corporation registered in South Australia. While a court judgement there recognises Scientology as a religion, COSRECI itself is not registered as a charity.

In 1999 CoS provided documents to the Charity Commission including a letter purported to originate from the Ministry of Defence that confirmed that Scientology is "an officially recognised religion in the Royal Navy". However, the 2012 Royal Navy Personnel Management Manual (in Chapter 31 - Religion and Faiths) makes no reference to Scientology. The Prison Service in England and Wales does not recognise Scientology as a religion. Under Scots law, Scientology ministers had been authorised to perform marriages in Scotland even prior to the December 2013 Supreme Court decision.

In September 2023, online publication Scientology Business reported that in response to a Freedom of Information Act Request, the Charity Commission for England and Wales confirmed that due to the Charities Act 2006 statute of limitations, Scientology are no longer able to appeal the 1999 rejection for tax-exempt status, and upheld their earlier ruling that it does not serve a public benefit in the United Kingdom.

==== Recognition for marriage purposes ====
In 2013, a case was brought against the Registrar General by two Scientologists who wished to be married in the chapel at the Church of Scientology in London but had been refused on the basis of a court ruling in the 1970s that Scientologists do not worship a god and therefore Scientology could not be considered a religion. On 11 Dec 2013, the Supreme Court in the UK overruled the previous ruling in R (on the application of Hodkin and another) v Registrar General of Births, Deaths and Marriages. In the Supreme Court's judgement, it established a new legal definition for religion as "a spiritual or non-secular belief system, held by a group of adherents, which claims to explain mankind’s place in the universe and relationship with the infinite, and to teach its adherents how they are to live their lives in conformity with the spiritual understanding associated with the belief system." Lord Toulson concluded that Scientology subsequently does meet that definition of a religion in the UK and ordered the Registrar General to recognise the Chapel at the Church of Scientology in London as a place of worship and as a place for the solemnisation of marriages under section 41(1) of the Marriage Act. The ruling does not affect the legal status of the Church of Scientology in charity law. According to its filing under the Marriage Act, Scientology will not conduct same-sex weddings in any of its UK premises.

== Beginnings ==
Hubbard established an organisation called the Dianetic Foundation of Great Britain in 1952. From 1957 to 1959, Hubbard lived and wrote at Fitzroy House in the West End of London. The house was sold off in 1968 but later bought back by the Church of Scientology and is now a museum in honour of Hubbard.

== East Grinstead ==
The global headquarters of the Scientology movement from 1959 to 1966 was Saint Hill Manor in East Grinstead, Sussex, a manor house dating from 1733. This is the most famous of the Church's "Advanced Organisations", delivering Operating Thetan training up to level 5. The estate contains a castle built by Scientologists in a medieval style, which opened in 1989. Hubbard developed security checking during this era and ordered that all check sheets should be forwarded to Saint Hill. In 1968, the Scientologists tried unsuccessfully to have their East Grinstead "chapel" officially recognised as a place of religious worship. Rejected by the Registrar General, they took the case to the Court of Appeal and lost in the case known as R v Registrar General, ex p Segerdal. The judge commented that Scientology was more of a "philosophy of the existence of man or of life, rather than a religion". The definition of religion that was functional in the Segerdal case was that religion "is concerned with man's relation with God, and ethics are concerned with man's relations with man. The two are not the same, and are not made the same by sincere inquiry into the question: 'what is God?'" Religion was defined as requiring faith in and worship of a God.

Scientologists own several shops in East Grinstead high street and are active in the Chamber of Commerce. They run an annual medieval fayre at the manor. When Religion, Inc., Stewart Lamont's unfavourable book about Scientology, was released in 1986, all the copies available in East Grinstead were bought up by one man.

Scientologists own a number of other properties around the town. One of its communal houses burnt down in 1991 and since then the Church has been prosecuted by the local council over fire safety. The Independent newspaper acquired documents in 1993 suggesting that the Scientologists had deceived council inspectors, pretending one dormitory housed 50 people when in fact there were 130 permanent residents.

During the 1970s, the Church's intelligence operations were directed from Saint Hill by the "Guardian World Wide", Jane Kember, and her deputy Mo Budlong. These included Operation Snow White (a campaign of burglary, infiltration and wiretapping of US Government offices and the Internal Revenue Service) and various "dirty tricks" against opponents. Kember and Budlong were extradited to the United States, where in November 1980 they were sentenced to two to six years in prison.

== Foreign entry ban and legal challenges ==
In a House of Commons of the United Kingdom speech on 25 July 1968, Minister for Health Kenneth Robinson said Scientology's practices were "a potential menace to the personality and well-being of those so deluded as to become its followers." Robinson's investigation was spurred by the publication of a letter of disconnection in the Daily Mail from a British Scientologist, Karen Henslow, to her mother in 1966. He described Scientology as "so objectionable that it would be right to take all steps... to curb its growth," and so introduced a ban on the immigration of foreign Scientologists. Until then, the Hubbard College of Scientology had, as a recognised educational institution, been allowed to receive foreign students. Foreign Scientologists already in the country were not allowed to stay. Additionally, work permits to foreign nationals seeking employment in Scientology establishments were restricted. According to an internal document from 1976, some of the Church's intelligence staff got around the ban by giving false information to immigration officials. Hubbard left the UK permanently in 1969, moving Scientology's world headquarters to a fleet of ships called the Sea Org. The Home Office told him not to return.

Scientologists denounced Kenneth Robinson's remarks as "insane". In retaliation against him, Scientology publications titled "Freedom Scientology", "Freedom and Scientology" and "Freedom" conducted a libel campaign, beginning in 1968. According to these newsletters, he was responsible for creating "death camps" to which innocent people were being kidnapped to be killed or maimed at will. Robinson successfully sued for libel, prompting a total retraction and substantial damages.

The government inquiry in 1971 recommended lifting the ban, by which time 145 individuals had been refused entry to the country. However, the ban was not immediately lifted. The Church took out multiple writs of libel against the Department of Health and Social Security, who in 1977 prepared a confidential report (released to the public 30 years later) to assess their position. According to this report, young people were being alienated from their families by the Disconnection policy and some Scientologists were being trained to carry out fair game actions against Church opponents. It also alleged that the Church was taking on young people with mental illness problems, charging them hundreds of pounds, then putting them out on the street after breakdowns. It warned that if the Government lost the libel cases, it could give "some seal of respectability to an organisation which is essentially evil". On its release, a Church spokesman attacked the document as "based on no evidence".

It was not until July 1980 that the Home Secretary reversed the ban, saying in Parliament, "My Right Hon. Friend the Secretary of State of Social Services is not satisfied that there is clear and sufficient evidence for continuing the existing policy with regard to Scientologists on medical grounds alone." Once the ban was lifted, applications by foreign Scientologists to come to the UK were assessed individually. However, all the applications were refused because of Scientology's non-religious status.

== Official inquiry ==
An official inquiry into Scientology in the UK was carried out by Sir John G. Foster and published in 1971. The report made its case with L. Ron Hubbard's own words and reprinted a number of Scientology internal ethics orders. It concluded that it would be unfair to ban Scientology outright, but asked for legislation to ensure that psychotherapy in the United Kingdom is delivered in an ethical manner. He regarded the Scientology version of "ethics" as inappropriate.

Documents seized by the FBI in raids on the Church's US headquarters in July 1977 revealed that an agent had been sent to investigate Sir John Foster in an attempt to link him to Paulette Cooper, author of The Scandal of Scientology and victim of Operation Freakout. The documents showed that Lord Balniel, who had requested the official inquiry, was also a target. Hubbard had written, "get a detective on that lord's past to unearth the tit-bits".

== The Latey judgement ==
In 1984, a custody dispute between a practicing Scientologist father and an ex-Scientologist mother came to the High Court. Although the father had stated that he would not raise the ten-year-old boy and eight-year-old girl as Scientologists, Mr Justice Latey ruled that they should reside with the mother (this would not otherwise have been the case since it meant disrupting the status quo for the children) due to the prospect of Scientology's "baleful influence" on their upbringing.

The case reached conclusions about many aspects of Scientology:

- Evidence was given of how the Disconnection policy had broken up families and relationships.
- Mr Justice Latey read some of Scientology's internal documents into the record. These included Training Routine - Lying (TR-L), a "Guardian's Order" describing ways to investigate and smear "traitors", and other documents relating to the fair game policy. He concluded that despite the ostensible cancellation of Fair Game, "Deprival of property, injury by any means, trickery, suing, lying or destruction have been pursued throughout and to this day with the fullest possible vigour."
- Evidence had been given "of instances of mental breakdown" during auditing courses.
- The case produced evidence that a Rehabilitation Project Force (an internal punishment system involving physical labour) was in operation in Saint Hill.
- Latey ordered Scientology to stop harassing the mother and her partner.

Mr Justice Latey revealed his conclusions in a public hearing because of their significance.

Scientology is both immoral and socially obnoxious. ... In my judgement it is corrupt, sinister and dangerous. It is corrupt because it is based on lies and deceit and has as its real objective money and power for Mr Hubbard, his wife and those close to him at the top. It is sinister because it indulges in infamous practices both to its adherents who do not toe the line unquestioningly and to those outside who criticise or oppose it. It is dangerous because it is out to capture people, especially children and impressionable young people, and indoctrinate and brainwash them so that they become the unquestioning captives and tools of the cult, withdrawn from ordinary thought, living and relationships with others.

A Church spokesman described the judgement as "a travesty of British justice", and alleged that there had been no opportunity for Scientology itself to submit evidence. Mr Justice Latey had observed that Scientology's lawyers had been in contact with the father and had had an opportunity to answer the allegations made in the case. The judgement was taken to the Court of Appeal the next year, where it was upheld.

== Relations with authorities ==
=== The Henslow case ===
In 1966, newspapers highlighted the case of Karen Henslow, a 30-year-old woman who had a history of psychiatric problems but had been recovering, who appeared to suffer ill-effects after going to Saint Hill and taking part in Scientology practices. The case was taken up by the newspapers, which published a Disconnection letter from Karen to her mother, and by local MP Peter Hordern.

Hubbard responded to the case the next year by sending out a letter to every Member of Parliament, complaining of libellous attacks from the newspapers and others "with a lurid turn of mind".

=== Geoffrey Johnson-Smith MP ===
In 1970 the Church attempted to sue Geoffrey Johnson-Smith, Conservative MP for East Grinstead, over claims he had made on BBC television that families were being alienated by the Disconnection policy. In court, he produced evidence of specific cases which were not disputed by the Scientologists. One of the witnesses against Johnson-Smith was William Hamling, Labour MP for Woolwich West, who had taken a course at Saint Hill in order to find out more about Scientology, and described the course as "first rate". The jury decided that Johnson-Smith's comments were substantially true and made in good faith.

=== Mental health professionals ===
According to a memo of 6 May 1971, Hubbard blamed the National Association for Mental Health (NAMH) and World Federation for Mental Health for attacks on Scientology and named Mary Appleby, Secretary of the NAMH, as the ultimate source. Starting in 1969, the NAMH was the target of a mass infiltration campaign by Scientologists who tried to take over key offices and change the organisation's policy on psychiatry. The large numbers of new membership applications just before a deadline raised the suspicion of the existing members and led to a mass expulsion. The Church of Scientology sued unsuccessfully in an attempt to get their members reinstated.

In 1988, Scientology-connected group the Citizens Commission on Human Rights (CCHR) conducted a defamation campaign against Professor Sir Martin Roth, a Cambridge University professor of psychiatry. Material provided by the CCHR falsely alleged that experiments run by Roth had damaged patients' brains with huge doses of LSD, led to more than 20 deaths in an Australian hospital, and maimed human subjects in Canada. The Newcastle Times, which had published an article based on the CCHR material, admitted the falsity of the allegations and paid substantial libel damages in 1990.

=== Police ===
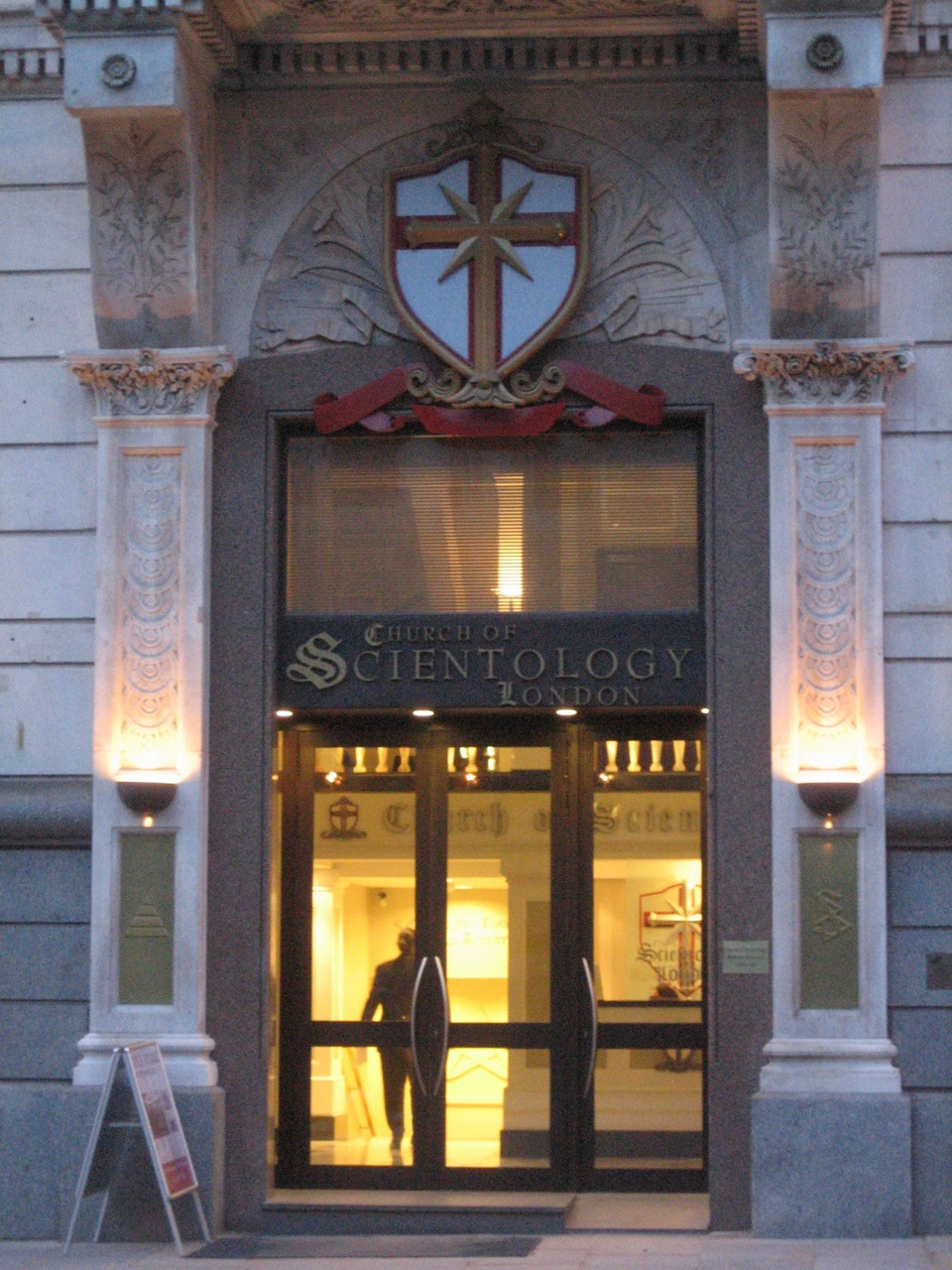
The City of London branch opened in October 2006, reportedly costing £24 million.

Operation Snow White was an intelligence operation launched by the Church to neutralise unfavourable information in government files internationally. Project Witch, the UK branch of Snow White, was directed at the UK branch of Interpol, the Royal Navy and various government ministries. Among the documents seized in the 1977 FBI raids that exposed Snow White was a memo from Jane Kember, the Church's worldwide head of intelligence. Kember announced that Scientology agents had obtained a Metropolitan Police report on the Church and asked for related documents so that a lawsuit against the police could be "mocked up".

On 22 October 2006, a new Church of Scientology centre opened on Queen Victoria Street in the City of London (next to the Faraday Building). David Miscavige, chairman of Scientology's Religious Technology Centre, came to the UK for the ceremony. Local dignitaries also attended the opening, including Chief Superintendent Keith Hurley, the City of London Police lead officer for faith issues. Hurley's speech thanked the Scientologists for their efforts after the 7 July attacks and described Scientology as "a force for good". This prompted anti-cult group Family Action Information Resource to openly criticise Hurley.

The next month, Freedom of Information requests by The Guardian and the Daily Mail revealed that more than twenty City officers had accepted dinners, free entry to Mission: Impossible III film premieres or other hospitality from the Church, including meetings with Tom Cruise. Nearly two years later, the City of London Police issued a court summons to a teenage protester for refusing to take down a placard calling Scientology a "dangerous cult". They later dropped the case on the advice of the Crown Prosecution Service.

=== Political parties ===
In January 2007, it emerged that the Association for Better Living and Education, a Scientology-connected charity which promotes Narconon and Criminon, had paid for stalls at the Labour and Conservative party conferences. Labour's decision to accept the money was taken by its National Executive Committee, and a spokesman described it as purely a "business transaction".

=== Advertising regulators ===
Television adverts for the Church of Scientology were aired in the early 1990s on Superchannel, but in February 1993 were banned by the Independent Television Commission after complaints. The ban was lifted in April 1996. Later that year, the Church produced an advert in which people of many different nationalities speak the word "trust". It aired initially on the cable channels UK Gold and UK Living and moved to Sky News and other channels, this being the UK's first ever national advertising campaign for a religion. Heber Jentzsch, president of the Church of Scientology International, came to the UK to launch the campaign.

In 2003, the Advertising Standards Authority censured the Church for a poster campaign stating that they had cured "Over 250,000" drug addicts. The figure was a count of everyone who had ever completed the Scientologists' detoxification program, including people whose "drug" exposure was infrequent use of alcoholic drinks or prescription drugs.

In March 2016, the Advertising Standards Authority received a complaint about a Church of Scientology television ad, challenging "whether the claim about the number of people it helps was misleading and could be substantiated", according to a report from The Guardian. The TV ad mentions that the Church works hand in hand with "volunteers from many faiths", helping 24 million people. The Church asserted that this number originates from the total number of people helped by the Scientology volunteer ministers between 1998 and 2014. The UK ad watchdog stated that the evidence provided by the Church to support the fact of direct aid provided, in forms of medical assistance, rescue and provision of basic needs, was only "anecdotal". The ad was banned by the ASA for lack of substantial evidence for the claim of helping 24 million people.

== Relations with academics, authors and the media ==
As Mr Justice Latey observed, L. Ron Hubbard created written policies that enemies are to be harassed using legal and extra-legal means, including frivolous lawsuits. At one point, the Church had 36 libel writs against British newspapers. An internal document from 1971 said that the Church's UK legal department "seldom, if ever, assesses its chances of winning before commencing action. ... Legal UK has been in courts more often in the past three years than the rest of the Scientology world combined. ... Do not worry about whether you will win or lose, but direct all effort and concentration on the legal technicalities required to achieve legal confrontation."

=== Critical authors ===
Cyril Vosper, a Scientologist for fourteen years, became disillusioned and wrote a critical book called The Mind Benders. In 1972, the Church sued to prevent publication, claiming that as a condition of taking the Special Briefing Course at Saint Hill he had agreed not to divulge its content to anyone who wasn't "clear". Lord Denning dismissed the case, arguing that the material was sufficiently dangerous for the public interest to override the confidentiality agreement.

Roy Wallis, a sociologist of religion, investigated Scientology in the 1970s and wrote The Road to Total Freedom: A Sociological Analysis of Scientology, tracing its evolution from a cult to an authoritarian religious sect. Before publication, he made 100 edits in negotiation with the Church, although this was not made clear in the book itself. On its publication, the Church denounced the book as biased and selective, but would later describe it as fair and reasonable. After the book's publication, a Scientology agent visited Stirling University where Wallis was teaching and tried to get him to implicate himself in the drug scene. Subsequently, forged letters apparently from Wallis were sent to his colleagues implicating him in scandalous activities including a homosexual love affair.

Journalist Russell Miller wrote a biography of L. Ron Hubbard entitled Bare-faced Messiah, which was published in 1987. He was spied on while researching the book in the US, and his friends and business associates received visits from Scientologists and private detectives. Attempts were made to frame him for the murder of a London private detective, the murder of singer Dean Reed in East Berlin and a fire in an aircraft factory. Senior executives at publishers Michael Joseph, and at The Sunday Times, which serialised the book, received threatening phone calls and also a visit from private investigator Eugene Ingram, who worked for the Church. Another private investigator, Jarl Grieve Einar Cynewulf, told Sunday Times journalists that he had been offered "large sums of money" to find a link between Miller and the CIA. The Church unsuccessfully tried for an injunction against Miller and Penguin Books to stop the book being published, a move that the judge described as "both mischievous and misconceived".

Another British journalist, Stewart Lamont, wrote Religion Inc. which was published in 1986. Its preparation was begun with the Church's co-operation, but Lamont refused to let their representatives review it before publication. Lamont and his publisher then reported a campaign of phone calls and letters from Scientologists, including legal threats. A private detective attempted to get damaging information about Lamont from his ex-wife, and other people posing as bank representatives contacted his neighbours. A Scientology spokesman accused Lamont and his publishers of exaggerating the response to generate publicity.

Paul Bracchi was a journalist at the Evening Argus in East Grinstead, and later at the national Daily Mail. He said in 2007 that after his series of investigative articles on Scientology for the Evening Argus in the 1990s, he was subjected to what he calls a "vicious smear campaign" including defamatory leaflets, threatening letters and faxes and an attempt to find his ex-directory telephone number.

Jon Atack, an ex-Scientologist who left in 1983, wrote the book A Piece of Blue Sky: Scientology, Dianetics and L. Ron Hubbard Exposed. He provided help to other members in leaving the organisation, as well as acting as an expert witness in various cases concerning Scientology. In response, Atack's home was repeatedly picketed by placard-carrying Scientologists over the course of six days. Eugene Ingram, a private investigator employed by the Church, made visits to Atack, his elderly mother and other family and friends, spreading rumours that Atack would be going to prison. Scientologists also distributed leaflets entitled "The Truth about Jon Atack", implying that he was a drug dealer who only criticised Scientology for money. Atack eventually went bankrupt due to the cost of defending himself against legal action from the Church.

In January 1997, Richard Ingrams, co-founder of Private Eye, made negative comments about L. Ron Hubbard in a column for The Observer. A Scientology internal fax from the United States, leaked to Observer journalist William Shaw, called for an operation to discredit Ingrams and to write a response. It listed details of his personal life and told the recipient to, "Find, investigate and document scandals Ingrams is for sure part of."

British journalist Andrew Morton wrote Tom Cruise: An Unauthorized Biography, published in early 2008. It alleged that Scientology had almost taken over the actor's life and that he was in effect the number two person in the Church. The Church denied this, and the book was not published in the UK for legal reasons. Cruise's lawyer, Bert Fields, gave interviews in which he denounced the book as "poorly researched" and a "rehash of tired old lies".

The Complex: An Insider Exposes the Covert World of the Church of Scientology, an Irish book by ex-Scientologist John Duignan, was removed from Amazon.co.uk and other UK bookstores in late 2008, after complaints that it is defamatory, which the publisher denied. UK readers could still order the book through Amazon US.

=== Twenty Twenty Television ===
Twenty Twenty Television made two documentaries which were shown in the Big Story series on ITV. For "Inside the Cult", which was broadcast on 13 July 1995, an undercover reporter joined staff in Poole and East Grinstead and was invited to join the Sea Organization. The Church said the programme "took everything out of context". In "The S Files", broadcast on 28 November 1996, former staff at Poole confessed to financial malpractice. The family of a young ex-Scientologist blamed Church harassment for contributing to his suicide, a charge countered by spokesman Mike Rinder.

In advance of the first broadcast, the Church of Scientology took out a private prosecution against the reporter, producer and production company, which was eventually thrown out as abusive. They also applied for a ban on the programme, but were refused by the Attorney General. At around the same time, cars belonging to the team had their windows smashed in, and the reporter's mobile phone was cloned and used to run up huge bills. The staff said these events were part of a harassment campaign in response to their documentary, although no connection with Scientology was ever proven and the allegations were denied by the Church.

=== Channel 4 ===
Secret Lives: L. Ron Hubbard was a biographical television documentary shown on 19 November 1997 on Channel 4, interviewing several members of Hubbard's inner circle. Scientologist John Travolta appealed directly to the channel's controller Mike Jackson in a failed attempt to prevent its broadcast.

The programme makers reported various forms of harassment. Private detective Eugene Ingram visited friends and associates of members of the team, spreading rumours that they were involved in crimes including money-laundering. A Scientologist agent phoned friends of the director and producer, posing as a member of a survey organisation and thereby tricking the phone contacts into revealing their addresses. Those who did were visited by private detectives. It is not known how the agent obtained the numbers that the programme makers had dialled from their private phones. During the making of the programme, the crew said that they were trailed by private detectives in the United States and Canada as well as in England. A film crew calling itself "Freedom TV" made unannounced visits to the homes of the programme makers to film them. The Church said it was investigating whether the programme was part of a campaign to extort money from them.

=== John Sweeney and BBC Panorama ===
Journalist John Sweeney filmed a documentary, "Scientology and Me", which was shown on 14 May 2007 as part of the BBC's Panorama series. In advance of the broadcast, the Church of Scientology released a 40-second video clip of Sweeney losing his temper and screaming in the face of their spokesman Tommy Davis at a Psychiatry: An Industry of Death exhibition. Sweeney was reprimanded by the BBC for his outburst. The Church of Scientology also responded by distributing its own documentary on DVD.

When the Panorama team were filming in the US, Scientology representatives followed them and repeatedly harangued them. Unknown men also trailed the team, one even appearing at John Sweeney's wedding. Sweeney later complained of being "chased round the streets of Los Angeles by sinister strangers ... In LA, the moment our hire car left the airport we realised we were being followed by two cars. In our hotel a weird stranger spent every breakfast listening to us." When the crew returned to London, Church executive Mike Rinder was sent from the United States to lobby the BBC, even camping out at their offices.

=== Private Eye ===
Private Eye magazine has on a number of occasions criticised Scientology's successful attempts at gaining the cooperation of official organisations with anti-drug campaigns run by its Narconon unit. These have included the City of London police, and schools in London and Cornwall. In 2008, Private Eye also criticised the City of London police for arresting a teenager who was holding a placard protesting against Scientology.

== Related groups ==
=== Greenfields School ===
A private school near East Grinstead uses the Study Technology devised by L. Ron Hubbard, which it licenses from Church-related group Applied Scholastics. Its connection to the Church was examined in 1984 by Mr. Justice Latey, who commented:

Scientology as such is not taught as a subject. But all the ambience is of Scientology, and it is plain that the Church exercises a strong influence if not indeed control. ... The School pays money annually to Scientology.

It emerged that most of the staff and governors were Scientologists, and that its Chairman of Trustees had been forced both to step down and remove his son from the school as punishment for speaking to suppressive persons. At the time, staff were working at charitable rates: an average of £40 per week. In 1994, local paper the Evening Argus reported that the school was hiding all mention of Scientology from its publicity materials. Greenfields is recognised as a charity by the Charity Commission.

=== Narconon ===
An "anti-drug" body, Narconon administers a "detoxification" procedure called the Purification Rundown, which they advertise as a cure for drug addiction. Narconon has been denied approval by the Home Office and has been refused funding by the Prison service. However, it is a recognised charity with a centre in Tunbridge Wells. Narconon officially denies a connection to the Church of Scientology, though the Church describes it as "a Scientology organisation" and the UK address of its parent body, the Association for Better Living and Education, is in Saint Hill Manor.

In 1994, the London Borough of Tower Hamlets funded an alcoholic to go to Narconon for detoxification, but the council withdrew funding when the Church of Scientology connection was revealed. The woman stayed on, funded by Narconon's trustees.

In 2001 an application for a Narconon promotional event in London's Trafalgar Square was barred by the mayor, Ken Livingstone.

It emerged in early 2008 that police around the country had attended briefings on the Church's "Say No to Drugs" campaign as part of a programme of meetings with "community leaders". Some police forces have distributed Narconon leaflets to schools. The leaflets described illegal drugs, prescription drugs and alcohol as "poison" and praised the Purification Rundown and Narconon as the best way to deal with drug abuse. Scotland Yard said working with the Church should not be seen as an endorsement.

As of 2023, Narconon is Scientology's only UK-registered charity, which operates a small facility in East Sussex capable of treating no more than 16 patients. A 2016 inspection by the Care Quality Commission found that the facility was not consistently well-led and that student feedback sessions were not being held due to a lack of service users.

=== Citizen's Commission on Human Rights ===
The Citizens Commission on Human Rights, a Scientologist anti-psychiatry group, has campaigned in Scotland to prevent the compulsory treatment of patients in ordinary psychiatric facilities and the high-security State Hospital.

=== Criminon ===
The Church of Scientology also runs a criminal rehabilitation organisation named Criminon. His Majesty's Prison Service HMPS have used Criminon as an option for prisoners' parole programmes to aid rehabilitation.

=== Volunteer Ministers ===
A group of 100 Volunteer Ministers joined the relief operation in the aftermath of the 7 July attacks in London. They distributed How To Improve Conditions In Life booklets, asking for a suggested donation of £3. They also provided cups of tea to the emergency services. Some of them later told a BBC reporter that they had kept psychiatric counsellors away from the bombing victims, because of the Scientology belief that psychiatry is evil.

== Independent Scientologists ==
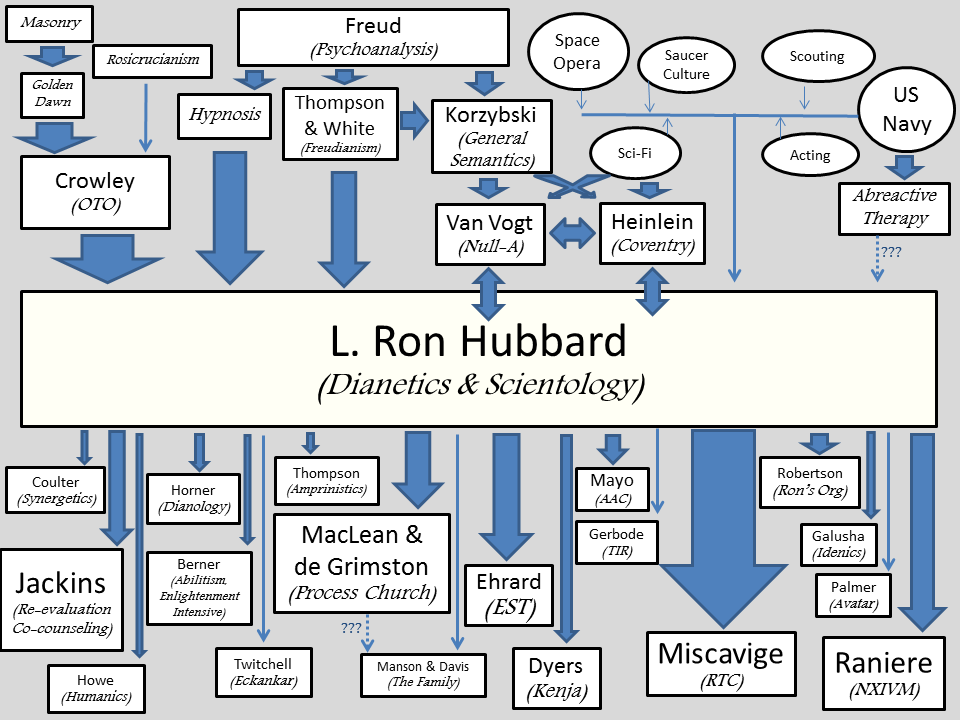
Hubbard's beliefs and practices, drawn from a diverse set of sources, influenced numerous offshoots, splinter groups, and new movements.

A schism in the early 1980s led to 3,500 Scientologists leaving the Church while some remained holding to the beliefs of Scientology. These Independent scientologists are called "squirrels" by the Church.

=== Advanced Ability Centre ===
In 1984, one group of former staff members set up a centre at Candacraig House in Strathdon, Scotland, to deliver the upper level materials of Scientology more cheaply than they were being delivered in the Church. It was founded by Robin Scott, who had been declared a "suppressive person" by the Church after making complaints within the organisation. They lacked some of the Operating Thetan documents, but came up with a way to obtain them by theft. Two of Scott's colleagues, Ron Lawley and Morag Bellmaine, dressed in Sea Organization uniforms and went into the Advanced Organisation in Copenhagen, presenting themselves as officers of the Religious Technology Center. They were allowed into a private room to inspect the base's New Era Dianetics for OTs; they put copies of these into Bellmaine's handbag and left. A Church agent tricked Scott into visiting Denmark the next year, where he was apprehended by Danish police and served a one-month jail sentence, with three further months suspended. The Church offered a reward of £120,000 for the return of the documents.

That particular group eventually became disillusioned with Scientology entirely and decided to publicly "expose" the Church as "an evil organisation". They showed a journalist the secret document, which tells of the galactic dictator Xenu, and fought a decade-long court battle to keep hold of the Denmark documents.

=== AFINITIES ===
One independent group, based in East Grinstead, called itself the "Association for Freely Incorporated Non Intimidatable, Trained and Independent Scientologists" (AFINITIES). It formed in the mid-1980s in response to the re-introduction of the Disconnection policy and other complaints against Church management. Their interpretation was that the teachings of L. Ron Hubbard, "encourage the unity of the family" and therefore that the Disconnection policy was "a misrepresentation or misapplication". Their goal was to buy out Saint Hill Manor and create a "university" where members could study Scientology without the objectionable policies.

== Opposition ==
=== FUSS ===
In 1995, a campaigning group was formed, calling itself Families Under Scientology Stress (FUSS), to bring together ex-members and concerned families. Two members of FUSS, Richard and Judy Price of Tonbridge in Kent, were amongst those who received threats of legal action from the Church's solicitor, accusing them of planning "unlawful and tortuous acts" against the Church. The Prices told a local newspaper that they were suffering "harassment and intimidation" including unsolicited visitors to their house late at night. The Church of Scientology spread a rumour to the press that Richard Price was an alcoholic, which he denied.

=== Bonnie Woods ===
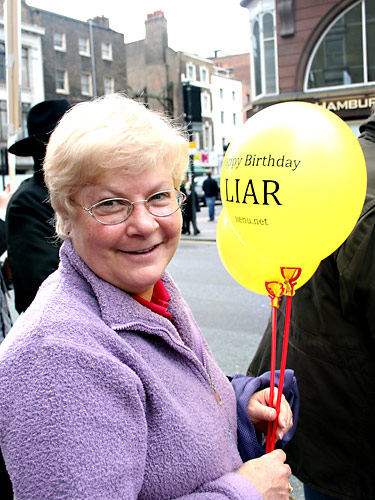
Woods in March 2008

Bonnie Woods is an American former Scientologist and critic of the Church of Scientology based in England. A former member of Scientology's Sea Org, she left in 1982 and later became known for supporting families affected by Scientology through a telephone helpline she ran with her husband. Woods was declared a "suppressive person" by the Church and became the subject of surveillance, picketing, and a leaflet campaign in her local community. She initiated libel proceedings against the Church, which in turn filed multiple suits against her. After six years of litigation (1993–1999), the case reached the High Court of Justice, where in 1999 the Church of Scientology admitted in open court that its allegations about her were false and paid damages and costs.

=== Cult-monitoring groups ===
INFORM, a Government-sponsored service which answers queries on new religious movements, has said that it receives more calls about Scientology than about any other sect. A spokesman said, "We're aware of several cases in which people have spent a lot more than they intended to on Scientology courses."

Ian Howarth, General Secretary of the Cult Information Centre described Scientology in a 1996 interview as "a group about which we are deeply concerned, and always have been". The Church of Scientology retaliated with a dossier about the CIC in 1997. This exposed Howarth's personal financial details and attempted to link him to a convicted criminal.

Another dossier about FAIR (Family Action Information Resource) held lurid allegations about the sex life of an ex-official.

In 1994, Lord Duncan McNair, a Scientologist and at that time a member of the House of Lords, called on the University of Hull to cancel an academic conference on religious cults.

=== Anonymous ===
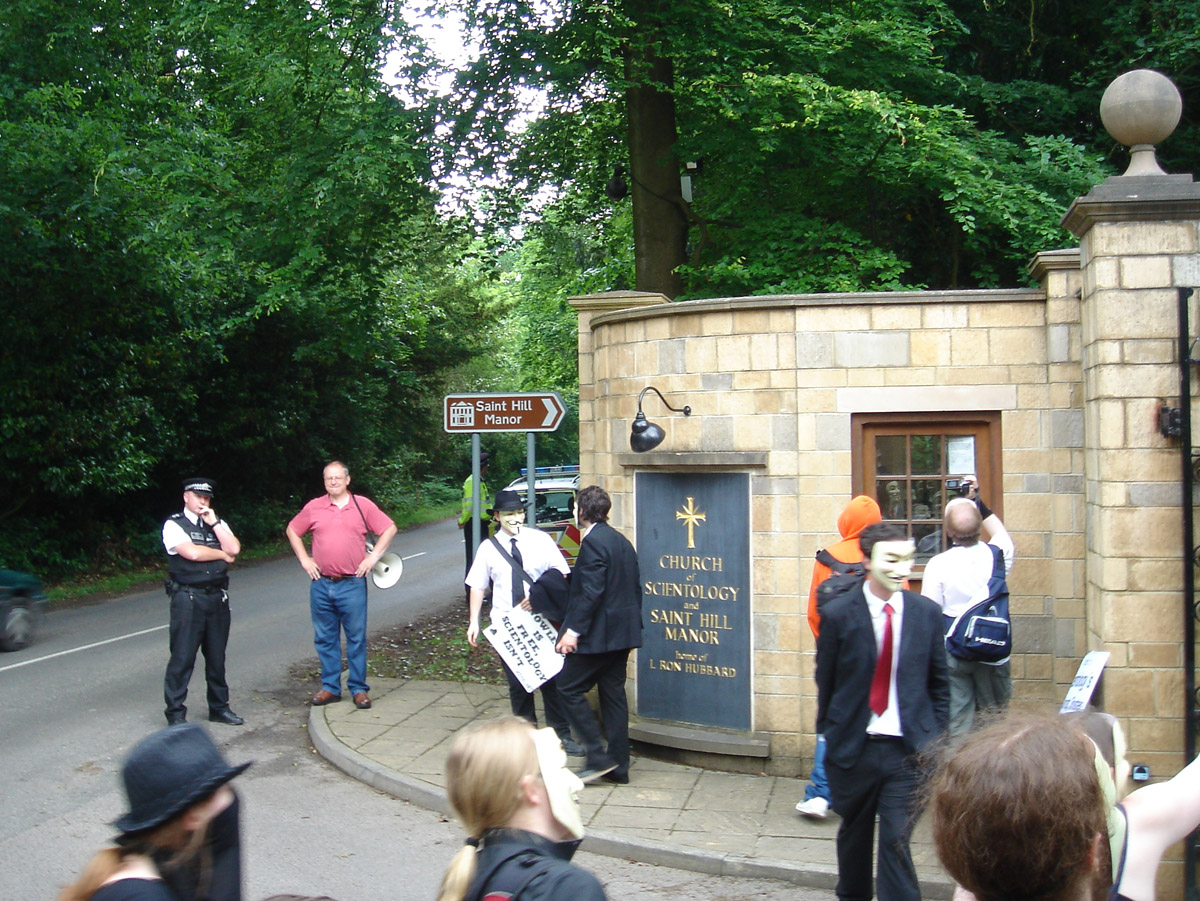
Anonymous demonstrating at the entrance to Saint Hill Manor

The Internet group Anonymous arranged demonstrations around the UK from February 2008 onwards as part of Project Chanology, its worldwide campaign to expose the Church of Scientology's "illegal and immoral behaviour". They wore Guy Fawkes masks inspired by the film V for Vendetta. The protests involved live "Rick Rolling" and the distribution of cake and biscuits to passers-by. Scientology spokespeople denounced the group as "terrorists".

=== 2023 to present ===
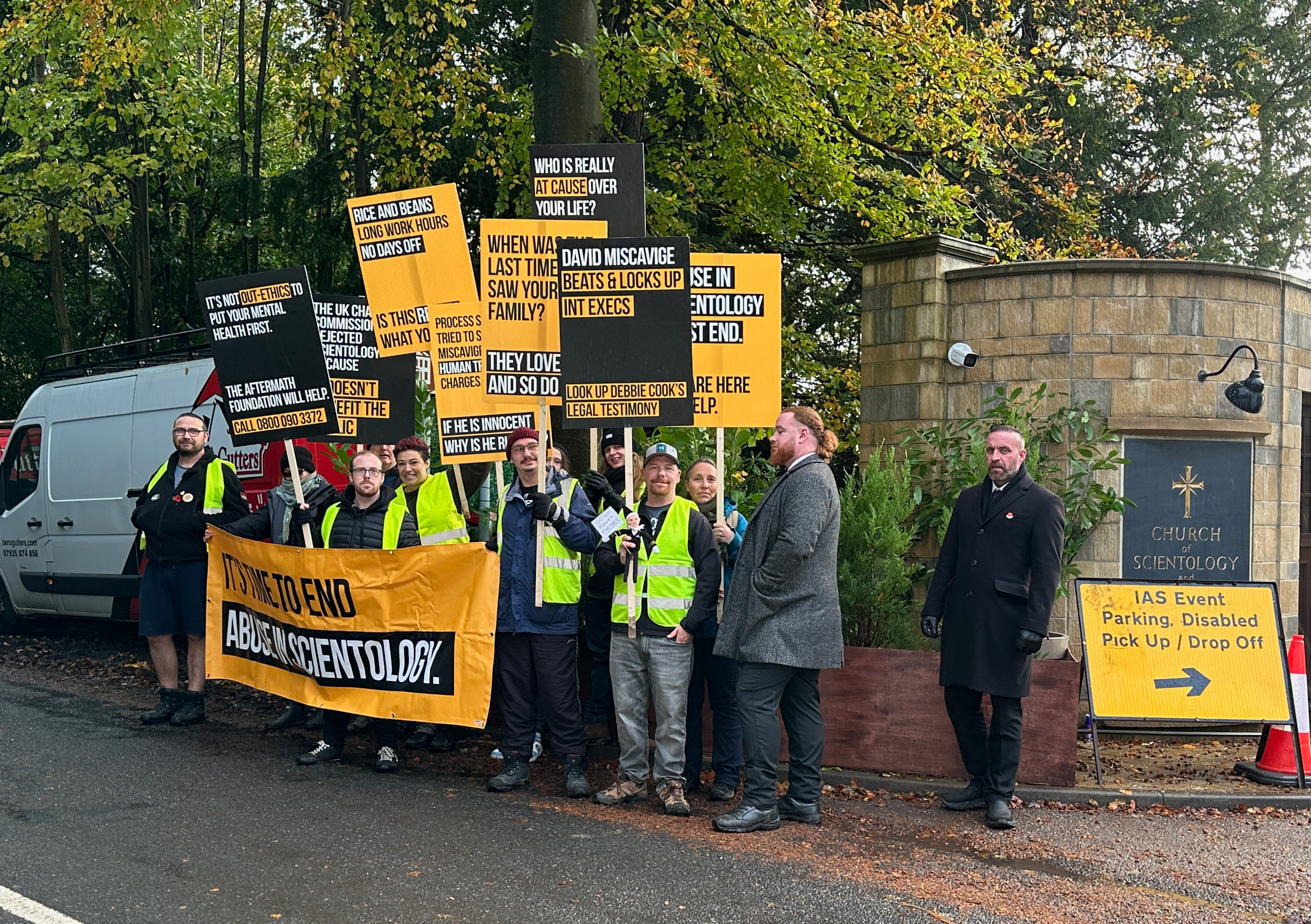
Group of demonstrators outside Saint Hill Manor, October 2023

Since 2023, there has been a renewal of interest among anti-Scientology activists in the UK. On the weekend of 3–5 November 2023, 46 protestors marched from East Grinstead to Saint Hill Manor, coinciding with the first International Association of Scientologists event to be held since the COVID-19 pandemic. It was the largest demonstration in Britain since the Anonymous movement 15 years prior and was also live streamed on YouTube. As of December 2023, it had attracted over 18,000 views. Alexander Barnes-Ross, who had been the director of public book sales at the Church of Scientology of London, organised the demonstration with the theme "The Abuse Must Stop".

In 2024 Scientology asked Mid Sussex District Council to put in place a public spaces protection order (PSPO) to prohibit public protest outside Saint Hill Manor. Protest organiser Alexander Barnes-Ross said this was a "direct threat to [ex-Scientologists] freedom of speech and right to protest". The district council scrutiny committee decided that the issue should be consulted on by the cabinet. Observations by the Council and the Police were made during the International Association of Scientologists (IAS) event held on 25 October 2024 as part of a consultation process.

During the consultation process the Church of Scientology sent Mid Sussex District Council a dossier containing un-redacted Medical Records and personal information of attendees of the 2024 IAS demonstration.

Days prior to the council vote on the implementation of a PSPO it was revealed that council officers were recommending to refuse the implementation of the order. Subsequent to this report in the news the Church of Scientology withdrew its application for a PSPO. It was reported that the cost of considering the PSPO application had cost Mid Sussex District Council more than £84,000.

Mid Sussex District Council voted against the implementation of the PSPO at a Cabinet Meeting held on 30 June 2025.

Minutes from the meeting show gratitude by the council leader for the professionalism of the council officers who gathered all the evidence during the consultation process. Officers had determined there were issues related to the IAS event, "specifically traffic disruption, risk of pedestrians walking in the road in the dark and noise nuisance".

It was noted that a voluntary code-of-conduct drawn up the by council, by way of avoiding a PSPO, was agreed upon by the demonstrators but not by the Church of Scientology. It was additionally noted that demonstrators had been neither aggressive nor threatening. It was also stated that police submissions had stated of demonstrators that "matters had been peaceful at all protests".

Additionally the leader of the council urged the Church of Scientology to refer itself to the Information Commissioner's Office for the dossier compiled on the demonstrators, as it constituted a data breach.

== See also ==
- Scientology status by country § United Kingdom
- Scientology and law § United Kingdom
- Religion in the United Kingdom
