= Life of L. Ron Hubbard from 1953 to 1967 =

From 1953 to 1967, L. Ron Hubbard was the official leader of the Church of Scientology.

In 1954 L. Ron Hubbard gained tax-exempt status in the United States for his Scientology organizations, and lost it in 1958 when the IRS determined Hubbard and his family were profiting unreasonably from Scientology. Hubbard became aggressive towards his enemies and detractors, claimed conspiracy theories against him, and declared all out war against psychiatry.

Hubbard moved to England, purchasing the country estate Saint Hill Manor as the new headquarters for Scientology worldwide. Trouble followed: in 1959 Hubbard's eldest son departed Scientology in disgust, Hubbard's medical claims for Dianetics and Scientology got him in trouble with the US Food and Drug Administration, and a governmental inquest in Australia resulted in a damning report on Scientology. By 1965 Hubbard invented ethics and justice procedures to tighten discipline, created the Guardian's Office, and wrote his infamous fair game policy.

Criticism against Scientology in England caused Hubbard to try Rhodesia for a while, until he was forced to leave there. Returning to England, Hubbard acquired three ships. In 1968, foreign Scientologists were prohibited from entering the United Kingdom and Hubbard was ejected from the country. Hubbard took to the sea with a handful of his followers.

== Recognition ==
By 1954, the IRS recognized the Church of Scientology of California as a tax-exempt organization and by 1966, the Washington, D.C. Founding Church of Scientology received tax-exempt status nationwide. The Church of Scientology became a highly profitable enterprise for Hubbard, as he was paid a percentage of the Church's gross income. By 1957 he was being paid about $250,000 (equivalent to US$2,865,818 in 2025).

His family grew, too, with Mary Sue giving birth to three more children—Geoffrey Quentin McCaully on January 6, 1954; Mary Suzette Rochelle on February 13, 1955; and Arthur Ronald Conway on June 6, 1958.

== Destroying enemies ==
Nibs, Hubbard's eldest son, who worked closely with his father from 1952 to 1959, later recalled a smear and libel campaign against Don Purcell: "You see, my father... only knew how to do one thing and that was to destroy people. He could not do anything lightly. To him, anybody who did anything against him, criticized him -- he would just flat go after their throat". Nibs recalled a large convention in Phoenix where his father fired a pistol into the floor to illustrate R2-45—a procedure for handling enemies that called for them to be shot in the head with a .45 pistol. Nibs commented, "I thought he was kidding and that it was a blank, but it wasn't; there was a hole in the floor. It was for real; he meant it."

"The purpose of the suit is to harass and discourage rather than to win. The law can be used very easily to harass"

Hubbard told Scientologists: "If attacked on some vulnerable point by anyone or anything or any organization, always find or manufacture enough threat against them to cause them to sue for peace ... Don't ever defend, always attack." Any individual breaking away from Scientology and setting up his own group was to be shut down.

The 1950s saw Scientology growing steadily. Hubbard finally achieved victory over Don Purcell in 1954 when the latter, worn out by constant litigation, handed the copyrights of Dianetics back to Hubbard. Most of the formerly independent Scientology and Dianetics groups were either driven out of business or were absorbed into Hubbard's organizations.

In 1955, Hubbard and family moved to D.C., with Hubbard arguing the Church was safer under federal jurisdiction.

== Denunciation of psychiatrists ==
In 1955, Hubbard wrote that "nearly all the backlash in society against Dianetics and Scientology has a common source — the psychiatrist-psychologist-psychoanalyst clique". In a letter addressed to the FBI dated July 11, Hubbard reports having been the victim of an "attack made by psychiatrists using evidently Communist connected personnel". In 1955, Hubbard authored a text titled: Brain-Washing: A Synthesis of the Russian Textbook on Psychopolitics. Published by the Church of Scientology, Hubbard alleged it was a secret manual written by Lavrentiy Beria, the Soviet secret police chief, in 1936. In this text, many of the practices Scientology opposes (psychiatry teaching, brain surgery, electroshock, income tax) are described as Communist-led conspiracies, and its technical content is limited to suggesting more of these practices on behalf of the Soviet Union. The text also describes the Church of Scientology as the greatest threat to Communism.

In 1956, Hubbard wrote an article entitled "A Critique of Psychoanalysis" which embodies Hubbard's harder stance. Writes Hubbard: "Now and then it becomes necessary to eradicate from a new subject things which it has inherited from an old. And only because this has become necessary am I persuaded to tread upon the toes of the "grandfather" to Dianetics and Scientology." In the essay, Hubbard admits that from "the earliest beginnings of Dianetics it is possible to trace a considerable psychoanalytic influence." Hubbard makes a distinction between Dianetics and Scientology writing that "Scientology, unlike Dianetics, is not a psychotherapy. It is therefore from the dominance of Scientology rather than from the viewpoint of Dianetics that one can understand the failings of psychoanalysis, its dangers and the reasons why it did not produce what it should have produced."

We discover psychoanalysis to have been superseded by tyrannous sadism, practiced by unprincipled men, themselves evidently in the last stages of dementia... Today men who call themselves analysts are merrily sawing out patients’ brains, shocking them with murderous drugs, striking them with high voltages, burying them underneath mounds of ice, placing them in restraints, 'sterilizing' them sexually and generally conducting themselves much as their patients would were they given the chance. It is up to us to realize, then, that psychoanalysis in its pure practice is dead the moment the spirit of humanity in which Freud developed the work is betrayed by the handing over of a patient to the merciless misconduct which passes today for treatment.

In 1956, Hubbard replaced a standard psychometric test with the Scientology-created Oxford Capacity Analysis. In 1957, Hubbard founded the "National Academy of American Psychology" which sought to issue a "loyalty oath" to psychologists and psychiatrists. Those who opposed the oath were to be labelled "Subversive" psychiatrists, while those who merely refused to sign the oath would be labelled "Potentially Subversive".

In 1958, Hubbard wrote that "Destroy is the same as help to a psychiatrist". His 1958 writings cited "Psychiatry: The Greatest Flub of the Russian Civilization" by Tom Esterbrook; Hubbard's son would later reveal that Tom Eastebrook was one of Hubbard's many pen-names.

== Search for a safe haven amid government scrutiny ==
In 1956, Hubbard released Fundamentals of Thought, which teaches that life is a game no matter what, and that the basic variable is the degree to which the individual knows what games they are playing and the degree to which they can knowingly come up with new ones. The following year, Hubbard published All About Radiation, which falsely claimed that radiation poisoning and even cancer can be cured by vitamins. In 1958, inspired the success of Bridey Murphy, Hubbard authored Have You Lived Before This Life?, a collection of past life regressions.

In 1958, the U.S. Internal Revenue Service withdrew the Washington, D.C., Church of Scientology's tax exemption after it found that Hubbard and his family were profiting unreasonably from Scientology's ostensibly non-profit income. Nibs Hubbard testified that in 1958, his father asked him to devise a plan for stealing an 'H-bomb'.

In the spring of 1959, he purchased Saint Hill Manor, an 18th-century English country house formerly owned by the Maharaja of Jaipur. The house became Hubbard's permanent residence and an international training center for Scientologists. In 1959, while Hubbard was in Melbourne, he learned his son Nibs had resigned from the organization, citing financial difficulties, and planned to seek full-time employment elsewhere. Hubbard regarded the departure as a betrayal. Hubbard introduced "security checking", a structured interrogation using the e-meter, to identify those he termed "potential trouble sources" and "suppressive persons". Members of the Church of Scientology were interrogated with the aid of E-meters and were asked questions such as "Have you ever practiced homosexuality?" and "Have you ever had unkind thoughts about L. Ron Hubbard?" For a time, Scientologists were even interrogated about crimes committed in past lives: "Have you ever destroyed a culture?" "Did you come to Earth for evil purposes?" "Have you ever zapped anyone?"

Hubbard marketed Dianetics and Scientology through medical claims. On January 4, 1963, Food and Drug Administration agents raided offices of the Church of Scientology, seizing over a hundred E-meters as illegal medical devices, thousands of pills being marketed as "radiation cures", and tons of literature that they accused of making false medical claims. Although the original suit by the FDA to condemn the literature and E-meters ultimately did not succeed, the Church of Scientology was required to label e-meters as being "ineffective in the diagnosis or treatment of disease".

In November 1963 Victoria, Australia, government opened an Inquiry into the Church, which stood was accused of brainwashing, blackmail, extortion and damaging the mental health of its members. Its report, published in October 1965, condemned every aspect of Scientology and Hubbard himself. He was described as being of doubtful sanity, having a persecution complex and displaying strong indications of paranoid schizophrenia with delusions of grandeur. His writings were characterized as nonsensical, abounding in "self-glorification and grandiosity, replete with histrionics and hysterical, incontinent outbursts". The report led to Scientology being banned in Victoria, Western Australia and South Australia, and led to more negative publicity around the world. Public perceptions of Scientology change from " relatively harmless, if cranky" to an "evil, dangerous" group that performs hypnosis and brainwashing. Scientology attracted increasingly unfavorable publicity across the English-speaking world.

In 1965, he designated several existing Scientology courses as confidential, repackaging them as the first of the esoteric "OT levels".

Hubbard took three major new initiatives in the face of these challenges. By 1965, "Ethics Technology" was introduced to tighten internal discipline within Scientology. It required Scientologists to "disconnect" from any organization or individual—including family members—deemed to be disruptive or "suppressive". Scientologists were also required to write "Knowledge Reports" on each other, reporting transgressions or misapplications of Scientology methods. Hubbard promulgated a long list of punishable "Misdemeanors", "Crimes", and "High Crimes". At the start of March 1966, Hubbard created the Guardian's Office (GO), a new agency within the Church of Scientology that was headed by his wife Mary Sue. It dealt with Scientology's external affairs, including public relations, legal actions and the gathering of intelligence on perceived threats. As Scientology faced increasingly negative media attention, the GO retaliated with hundreds of writs for libel and slander; it issued more than forty on a single day. Hubbard ordered his staff to find "lurid, blood sex crime actual evidence [sic] on [Scientology's] attackers". The "fair game" policy was codified in 1967, which was applicable to anyone deemed an "enemy" of Scientology: "May be deprived of property or injured by any means by any Scientologist without any discipline of the Scientologist. May be tricked, sued or lied to or destroyed."

In 1966, Hubbard declared South African Scientologist John McMaster to be the first true Clear. He became a leading public spokesman for Scientology. He left in November 1969.

External videos
- L. Ron Hubbard Interview in Rhodesia, May 1966

Rhodesia was an unrecognized state in Southern Africa from 1965 to 1979.

Newspapers and politicians in the UK pressed the British government for action against Scientology. In April 1966, hoping to form a remote "safe haven" for Scientology, Hubbard traveled to the southern African country Rhodesia (today Zimbabwe) and looked into setting up a base there at a hotel on Lake Kariba. Despite his attempts to curry favour with the local government—he personally delivered champagne to Prime Minister Ian Smith's house, but Smith refused to see him—Rhodesia promptly refused to renew Hubbard's visa, compelling him to leave the country. Finally, at the end of 1966, Hubbard acquired his own fleet of three ships.

In July 1968, the British Minister of Health, Kenneth Robinson, announced that foreign Scientologists would no longer be permitted to enter the UK and Hubbard himself was excluded from the country as an "undesirable alien". Further inquiries were launched in Canada, New Zealand and South Africa.

== Works cited ==
- Atack, Jon (1990). A Piece of Blue Sky: Scientology, Dianetics and L. Ron Hubbard Exposed. Lyle Stuart Books. ISBN 081840499X. OL 9429654M.
- Barrett, David V. (2001). The New Believers: A Survey of Sects, Cults and Alternative Religions. London: Cassell and Co. ISBN 978-0304355921. OL 3999281M.
- Bigliardi, Stefano (2016). "New Religious Movements, Technology, and Science: The Conceptualization of the E-Meter in Scientology Teachings". Zygon. 51 (3): 661–683. doi:10.1111/zygo.12281.
- Evans, Christopher. Cults of Unreason. New York: Farrar, Straus and Giroux, 1974. ISBN 0-374-13324-7, OCLC 863421
- Lewis, James R. (2009a). "Introduction". In Lewis, James R. (ed.). Scientology. Oxford and New York: Oxford University Press. pp. 3–14. ISBN 978-0-19-5331-49-3.
- Melton, J. Gordon. Encyclopedic handbook of cults in America. Taylor & Francis; 1992. ISBN 978-0-8153-1140-9
- Melton, Gordon (March 19, 2009). Lewis, James R. (ed.). Scientology. New York/Oxford: Oxford University Press. ISBN 978-0-1953-3149-3.
- Miller, Russell (1987). Bare-faced Messiah : The True Story of L. Ron Hubbard. Henry Holt and Company. ISBN 0805006540. OCLC 17481843. OL 26305813M.
- Streissguth, Thomas (1995). Charismatic cult leaders. The Oliver Press. ISBN 978-1-881508-18-2. OCLC 30892074.
- Thomas, Aled (2021). Free Zone Scientology: Contesting the Boundaries of a New Religion. London: Bloomsbury. ISBN 978-1-350-18254-7.
- Urban, Hugh B. (2011). The Church of Scientology: A History of a New Religion. Princeton University Press. ISBN 9780691146089.
- Wallis, Roy (1977). The Road to Total Freedom: A Sociological Analysis of Scientology. Columbia University Press. ISBN 0231042000. OL 4596322M.
