= Bare-faced Messiah =

Biography of L. Ron Hubbard

Bare-Faced Messiah
- Cover of UK paperback edition
- Author: Russell Miller
- Language: English
- Subject: L. Ron Hubbard
- Genre: Non-fiction
- Publisher: Michael Joseph
- Publication date: 26 October 1987
- Publication place: United Kingdom
- Media type: Print (Hardcover and Paperback)
- Pages: 380
- ISBN: 0-7181-2764-1
- OCLC: 20634668
- Dewey Decimal: 299/.936/092 B 20
- LC Class: BP605.S2 M55 1987

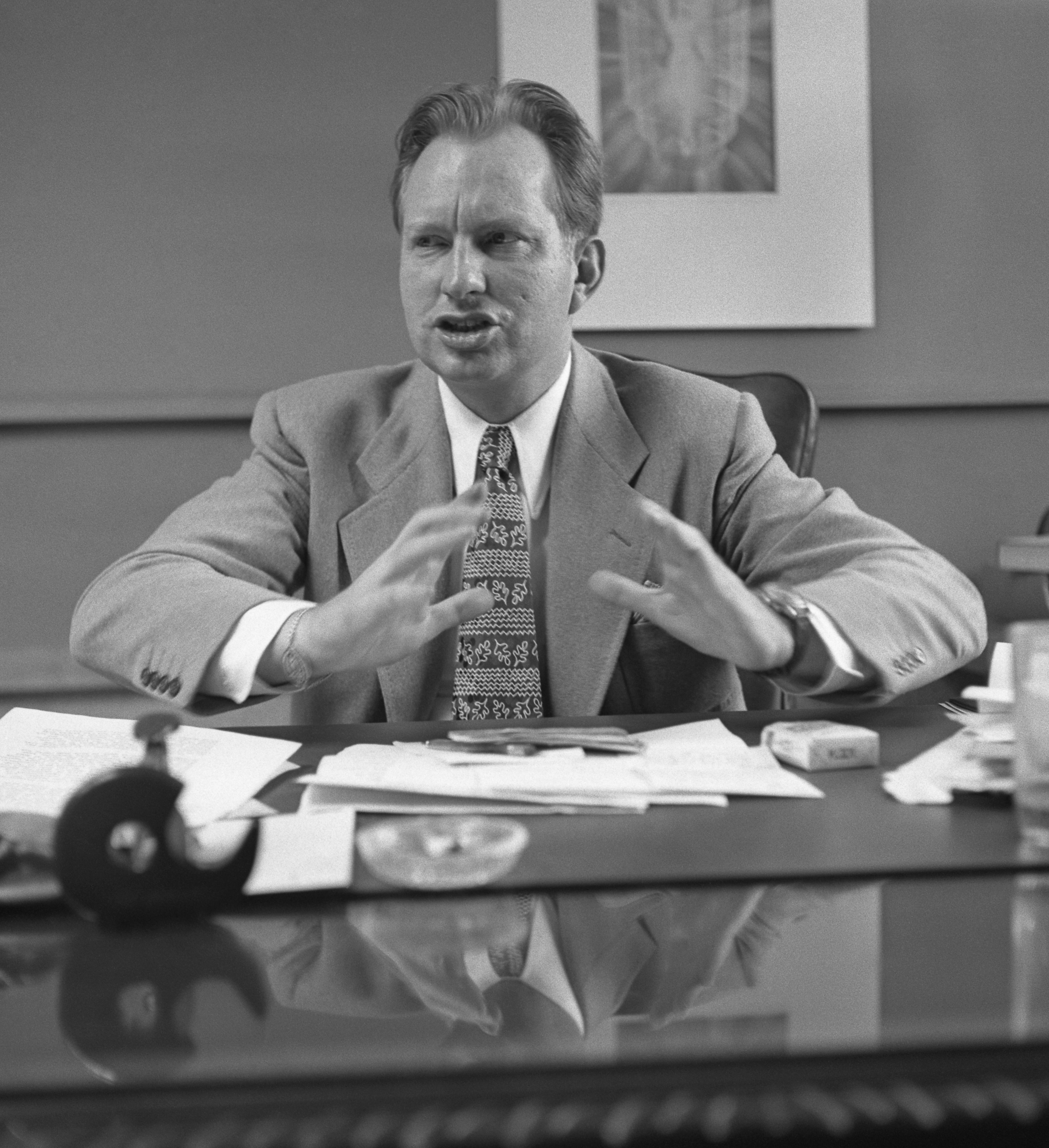
L. Ron Hubbard, the subject of Bare-Faced Messiah

Bare-Faced Messiah: The True Story of L. Ron Hubbard is a posthumous biography of Scientology founder L. Ron Hubbard by British journalist Russell Miller. First published in the United Kingdom on 26 October 1987, the book takes a critical perspective, challenging the Church of Scientology's account of Hubbard's life and work. It quotes extensively from official documents acquired using the Freedom of Information Act and from Hubbard's personal papers, which were obtained via a defector from Scientology. It was also published in Australia, Canada and the United States.

Reviews of the book have been broadly positive — one calling it "the best and most comprehensive biography of L. Ron Hubbard" — and praise the quality and depth of Miller's research.

The Church of Scientology strongly opposed the book's publication. The organization was accused of organising a smear and harassment campaign against Miller and his publisher, though it strenuously denied this accusation, and a private investigator involved in the campaign denied that the organization was his client. However, a leak of internal Scientology documents to the press in 1990 disclosed many details of the campaign. The organization and related corporate entities attempted to prevent the book's publication in court, resulting in cases that reached the Supreme Court of the United States, the Court of Appeal of England and Wales and the Federal Court of Canada. The U.S. Supreme Court's decision to let a lower court's ruling stand, denying fair use protection for the book's use of unpublished sources, set a precedent favouring copyright protection of unpublished material over biographers' freedom of speech. Courts in the UK and Canada took an opposite view, allowing publication of Bare-Faced Messiah in the public interest.

== Background and synopsis ==
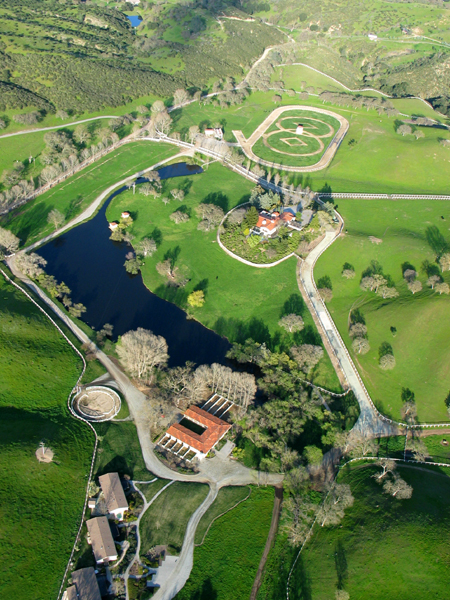
Miller traced Hubbard to the vicinity of San Luis Obispo, California, where the Scientology leader was living secretly on this ranch, but Hubbard died before Miller could finish his research.

Russell Miller had been an investigative journalist for the Sunday Times and had written well-received biographies of Hugh Hefner (Bunny, published in 1984) and J. Paul Getty (The House of Getty, 1985). These were the first two biographies of a trilogy on sex, money and religion, with the Hubbard book completing the trilogy. He spent two years researching the book, which followed a Sunday Times Magazine investigation of the Church of Scientology published in October 1984. In 1985, he suggested that the Sunday Times should try to find Hubbard, who had disappeared from public view several years earlier. If the project succeeded, it would be a worldwide scoop for the newspaper. Even if it did not find the reclusive Scientology leader, the continuing mystery would itself be a good story. Through contacts among ex-Scientologists in the U.S., Miller narrowed down the area where Hubbard was hiding to the vicinity of San Luis Obispo, California. However, Hubbard died in January 1986 before Miller could finish his project. He decided at this point to use his research as the basis of a full-fledged biography of Hubbard, in addition to writing the previously agreed series of articles for the Sunday Times.

Bare-Faced Messiah covers a period from 1911, when Hubbard was born, to his death in 1986, with some additional background on his family history. It describes his early life, his success as a science fiction writer in the 1930s and 1940s, his military career during the Second World War, the rise of Dianetics and Scientology in the 1950s, his journeys at sea with his followers in the 1960s and early 1970s and his legal problems and period as a recluse from the mid-1970s to 1986. The author draws on previously unpublished materials, such as Hubbard's teenage diaries and personal correspondence to colleagues, employers and the FBI, as well as government documents like Hubbard's military service record and FBI file. In an "author's note", Miller writes that the book would have been impossible without the Freedom of Information Act. Among the private papers quoted in the book are a letter written by Hubbard to the FBI denouncing his wife as a Soviet spy, another in which he tells his daughter Alexis that he is not really her father and an internal letter in which he suggests that Scientology should pursue religious status for business reasons. Other sources used by Miller include news articles and comments from interviews that he conducted with Hubbard's old acquaintances and family members.

Miller's research was assisted by a set of Hubbard's personal papers obtained by Gerry Armstrong, a former employee of the Church of Scientology. Armstrong had been preparing material for an official biography of Hubbard, but left the Scientology organization in 1981 after finding that Hubbard's claims about his life conflicted with independent sources. The Church of Scientology obtained an injunction in California to prevent Armstrong from further distributing the documents. However, English courts refused to enforce this order.

In the book's preface, Miller summarizes his view of Hubbard:

The glorification of 'Ron', superman and saviour, required a cavalier disregard for facts: thus it is that every biography of Hubbard published by the church is interwoven with lies, half-truths and ludicrous embellishments. The wondrous irony of this deception is that the true story of L. Ron Hubbard is much more bizarre, much more improbable, than any of the lies.

The book contrasts Hubbard's boasts with Miller's research. For example, Chapter 6, which is entitled "The Hero Who Never Was", begins by quoting the official church biography: "Commissioned before the war in 1941 by the US Navy ... serving in all five theaters of World War II and receiving 21 medals and palms ..." And it ends by countering:

If his own account of his war experiences is to be believed, he certainly deserved the twenty-one medals and palms he was said to have received. Unfortunately, his US Navy record indicates he was awarded just four routine medals – the American Defense Service Medal, awarded to everyone serving at the time of Pearl Harbor, the American Campaign Medal, the Asiatic-Pacific Campaign Medal and the World War Two Victory Medal, this last received by everyone serving on V-J Day.

For more detail on the debate surrounding Hubbard's military career, see the main article.

== Harassment of author and publishers ==
The Church of Scientology refused all cooperation with Miller and sought to obstruct his research. He wrote in his "author's note" at the start of the book:

[T]he Church did its best to dissuade people who knew Hubbard from speaking to me and constantly threatened litigation. Scientology lawyers in New York and Los Angeles made it clear in frequent letters that they expected me to libel and defame L. Ron Hubbard. When I protested that in thirty years as a journalist and writer I had never been accused of libel, I was apparently investigated and a letter was written to my publishers in New York alleging that my claim was 'simply not accurate'. It was, and is.

External videos
- 2023 interview with Russell Miller covering his methods of investigating Hubbard for the book Bare-faced Messiah, the harassment and dirty tricks from the Church of Scientology and the lawsuits to stop publication of the book, and how different Scientology's hagiographic version of Hubbard is from what Miller found in the records.

Miller had been warned before he began his work that he would face difficulties, but was unprepared for the level of harassment that he endured. While researching the book in the U.S., he was spied upon and was constantly followed. His friends and business associates also received hostile visits from Scientologists and private detectives trying to find "dirt" on him. In October 1987, Miller commented: "There are teams of private detectives in the U.S. and this country questioning my friends and trying to discredit me." Attempts were made to implicate him in the murder of a private detective in South London, a fire in a Wiltshire aircraft factory, and the murder of American singer Dean Reed. Reed had died the day before Miller arrived in East Berlin to interview him. Miller's family was approached by private detectives seeking to implicate him in Reed's death, although they would not say who their client was. Another private investigator interviewed Miller's friends and associates, claiming to be acting for Reed's family, though they denied employing him. A former Scientology insider told the Sunday Times that Miller "is kept under constant watch. Every time he goes abroad a two-man mission will be waiting for him at the airport when he arrives. They will monitor where he goes, who he sees, where he stays. This information will be added to his file, which is already more than 100 pages thick."

Senior executives at publishers Michael Joseph and at the Sunday Times, which serialised the book, received threatening phone calls and a visit from private investigator Eugene Ingram, who worked for the Church. Another private investigator, Jarl Grieve Einar Cynewulf, told Sunday Times journalists that he had been offered "large sums of money" to find a link between Miller and the Central Intelligence Agency (CIA), as the Church reportedly believed that the CIA was driving investigations into its tax affairs in the U.S. According to Cynewulf, Miller's mail and phones were intercepted and his home was under constant surveillance. The newspaper reported that Cynewulf had chased its reporter and photographer through the streets of Bristol, armed with a pistol which he fired at them, saying, "You'd better go now unless you want to end up in a wooden box. Do you want to be another Hungerford martyr?"

In 1990, nearly three years after the book's first publication, a defector from the Church of Scientology provided the Sunday Times with internal documents detailing the smear campaign against Miller. These records listed several private investigators who had been hired to keep Miller under surveillance and feed false information about him to neighbours and the police. A Scientology executive had flown from Los Angeles to a flat in London where he and a private detective co-ordinated the campaign. Rubbish from the publisher's offices was regularly emptied into the flat's bathtub to be picked through. According to the informant, the investigators used contacts with the British police to try to implicate him in unsolved crimes: "People were brought in from abroad posing as journalists to arrange interviews with Scotland Yard where they would drop innuendoes about Miller. Other investigators were used to smear his name with colleagues, friends and neighbours. They worked hard on the line that he was an undercover British intelligence man." A Church spokesman dismissed these allegations, saying, "anyone giving you this sort of information must be crazy or on drugs."

== Litigation ==
The Church of Scientology and related entities sought injunctions against the book's publication, claiming copyright infringement of Hubbard's private documents. They threatened to sue in as many as 50 countries, adopting a strategy that the University of Pennsylvania's Professor Paul K. Saint-Amour has described as "an international parade of litigation" and "whack-a-mole legal proceedings". Much of the dispute centred on the plaintiffs' argument that the actions of former Scientology archivist Gerry Armstrong in providing Miller with unpublished materials (whether directly or indirectly) were a breach of his duty of confidence to the Church, and that the use of excerpts from this material violated copyrights owned by Hubbard's estate. Miller later noted that the plaintiffs did not attempt to dispute the facts of the book in court which, he said, was a pity as he had been looking forward to defending his meticulous research.

=== United Kingdom ===
The first lawsuit was heard in the UK in October 1987 by Justice Vinelott. The litigants, the Church of Scientology of California, failed to obtain an injunction against the publication of the book. In his decision of 9 October 1987, the judge said that it was "clear that the public interest far outweighed any duty of confidence that could conceivably be owed to Mr. Hubbard or his church." The unpublished materials were held to be "essential" if Hubbard's early career was to be "properly evaluated", and legal decisions against Armstrong in California could not bind an English court. The judge held that the Church had acted improperly in bringing its suit so late in the day. It had become aware in May of the plans to publish Bare-Faced Messiah, but had not brought suit until 29 September, less than a month before publication. The application for an injunction, he said, "was made at a time, whether calculated or not, when the greatest possible damage and inconvenience would be caused to Penguin Books". No satisfactory explanation had been made for the delay and, in the judge's view, the application "was oppressive, and was not brought to protect any legitimate interest."

The judgement was upheld by the Court of Appeal on 22 October. The decision by Lord Justice Fox argued that Hubbard's "cosmic significance" in Scientology – a group which itself had been the subject of a Government report in 1972 – implied a strong public interest in the book's content. The delay in applying for an injunction was reason in itself to justify dismissing the appeal, but in addition the court ruled that "the public had an interest that assertions of fact [by the Church] should be exposed to public criticism. The founder was dead and the material was not alleged to be untrue." The court noted that the plaintiffs had not argued that publication of the book would damage Hubbard's or the Church's reputation or that it was in any way defamatory. The Church was refused leave to appeal to the House of Lords.

In advance of the court case, a female Scientologist was found collecting seven copies of the unpublished proofs from a copy shop in East Grinstead, near the Church of Scientology's UK headquarters at Saint Hill Manor. She was arrested but later released as there was no evidence of theft.

=== Canada, Australia and South Africa ===
In Canada, New Era Publications International ApS of Denmark — an arm of the Church of Scientology — petitioned the Federal Court of Canada to block the publication of Bare-Faced Messiah in December 1987. New Era submitted its request days before publisher Key Porter Books planned to begin its print run. The company argued that its sales of Hubbard's books would be adversely affected by the damage that Miller's book would cause to Hubbard's reputation. It also claimed that copyright had been violated through the unauthorised excerpting of unpublished materials and books written by Hubbard, and that it would interfere with New Era's own plans to publish an "authorised" biography based on the same materials. New Era's bid was rejected by Justice Bud Cullen, who said that the evidence presented in favour of an injunction "falls far short of the evidence required" to sustain such a request. He characterised Hubbard as an author of "outlandish, foolish, vicious, racist writings." Similar bids to block the book failed in Australia and South Africa.

=== United States ===
A suit was brought in the U.S. by New Era Publications in May 1988 that sought to prevent Bare-Faced Messiah being distributed, after it had already been published and shipped. Prior to publication, New Era offered to buy out the publication rights to Bare-Faced Messiah but was rebuffed. Publisher Henry Holt had distributed 12,500 copies by the time New Era obtained a temporary restraining order to prevent shipment of the remaining copies from the first print run. New Era's request for an injunction against the distribution of the existing copies was refused. Henry Holt's president, Bruno Quinson, declared his company's intention to fight the suit: "This is a case, to say the least, that has serious First Amendment considerations and we are vigorously opposing the Scientologists' efforts to prevent the publication of this book."

The district court that first heard the case ruled that, although the quotation of private correspondence breached copyright law, an injunction would deny the publisher's First Amendment rights. By coincidence, the judge who heard the case, Pierre N. Leval, was the same person who had recently heard a case involving the private correspondence of the writer J. D. Salinger, which resulted in a higher court's setting a controversial precedent that fair use protection could not be accorded to works that quoted unpublished material. His decision was seen as a repudiation of the higher court's Salinger precedent: "The grant of an injunction would ... suppress an interesting, well researched, provocative study of a figure who, claiming both scientific and religious credentials, has wielded enormous influence over millions of people."

When the case was appealed, the Second Circuit disagreed with Leval's judgement, arguing that copyright outweighed free speech arguments. Again coincidentally, the author of the decision was Judge Roger Miner, who had been among the authors of the Salinger decision. The court reiterated the Salinger finding that there was a "strong presumption against fair use of unpublished work" and that unpublished primary source materials should "normally enjoy complete protection" from fair use claims. This could not be overridden by the First Amendment. Nonetheless, the court still denied an injunction on the grounds of laches, specifically that New Era had waited two years to bring the case after first learning about the book. By "sleeping on its rights" — waiting too long — New Era had lost any right to equitable relief and had unfairly caused damage to Miller's publisher by the delay. Judge James L. Oakes agreed with the decision in a concurring opinion but argued that the majority had been wrong to reject the First Amendment as a defence. He argued, "Responsible biographers and historians constantly use primary sources, letters, diaries, and memoranda. Indeed, it would be irresponsible to ignore such sources of information."

Although they had prevailed, Henry Holt and Company asked all of the appeals court's judges for a rehearing en banc to establish that they had not just won on a technicality. The court denied this request by a 7–5 majority. The denial produced an unusual split between the judges; four who supported a rehearing stated that they believed that "copying some small amounts of unpublished expression to report facts accurately and fairly" was covered by fair use, while five who opposed it rejected that proposition, declaring that "under ordinary circumstances" the use of "more than minimal amounts of unpublished expressive material" should attract an automatic injunction. This argument was widely criticised following the case. David J. Goldberg and Robert J. Bernstein wrote in the New York Law Journal in May 1989 that the central problem with the majority's view was that:

The Second Circuit majority in New Era departed from basic fair use principles that require an accommodation of competing interests and equities. Instead, it elevated one fact — the unpublished status of Hubbard's writings — to an almost insurmountable obstacle to a successful fair use defense. By handcuffing future considerations of the fair use defense in the context of unpublished writings, the Second Circuit ignored the explicit mandate that the equities must be flexibly balanced case by case.

In 1990, Henry Holt petitioned the Supreme Court, which let the Second Circuit's judgement stand. The outcome of the case drew a concerned reaction from publishers and journalists, who complained that biographies would become much more legally and financially difficult to publish. A brief for the PEN American Center and the Authors Guild expressed the publishing industry's "confusion, consternation and concern" at the outcome. The American historian Arthur M. Schlesinger Jr. called the decision "a great sadness", arguing that had it been made earlier, he could not have published all three volumes of his history The Age of Roosevelt.

In the end, Henry Holt abandoned the litigation, as the ongoing legal costs were becoming unsupportable. The print run of Bare-Faced Messiah in the U.S. was ended after only 14,000 copies were printed. Many went to public libraries, but, according to Miller, numerous library copies of the book went missing or had inserts pasted into them by Scientologists.

== Reception ==
Reviews of Bare-Faced Messiah were overall very positive, though some reviewers criticised what they regarded as omissions on Miller's part. The Church of Scientology was highly critical of the book. Its view of Miller's book was summed up by the executor of the Hubbard estate, who called it "a scumbag book ... full of bullshit", while a Scientology spokesperson in Canada compared it to "a life of Christ [written] by Judas Iscariot."

Dave Langford reviewed Bare-Faced Messiah for White Dwarf #97, and stated that "I have a high opinion of Isaac Asimov's honesty and integrity: in sharp contrast to Hubbard, he's always been committed to truth."

"Bare-faced Messiah... remains the best and most comprehensive biography of L. Ron Hubbard"

— Janet Reitman, Inside Scientology: The Story of America's Most Secretive Religion, 2011

The American science writer Martin Gardner's review in Nature called Bare-Faced Messiah an "admirable, meticulously documented biography". Gardner had previously written about the start of Scientology in his classic 1952 book Fads and Fallacies in the Name of Science, at which time he regarded Hubbard as a harmless crank, but Miller's book persuaded Gardner that Hubbard was "a pathological liar who steadily deteriorated from a charming rogue into a paranoid egomaniac".

Sociologist J. Gordon Melton wrote that along with Stewart Lamont's Religion Inc., Miller's book is "by far the best" among the books published by Scientology critics, though he notes that the Church of Scientology has "prepared statements on each [substantive statement] indicating factual errors and omissions." Melton concludes that Miller's book is compromised by its author's lack of access to documents charting Hubbard's life and the early history of the church. Melton disputes Miller's assertion that Hubbard was lying about his military career: "Hubbard left the service in February 1946 with twenty-one citations, letters of commendation, and medals on his record. The details of Hubbard's naval career have been called into question by the critics of Scientology. Critics rely on an alleged copy of Hubbard's notice of separation deposited in the Veteran's Administration and accessible through the Freedom of Information Act." However, the document on which the Church of Scientology bases its claim of 21 awards is a forgery, according to US government archivists, and lists ships and medals that did not exist.

Writing for the Marburg Journal of Religion, the German Protestant theologian and history of religion scholar Marco Frenschkowski called Bare-Faced Messiah the "most important critical biography of Hubbard. Like [Friedrich-Wilhelm Haack's Scientology — Magie des 20. Jahrhunderts] and [Bent Corydon's L. Ron Hubbard: Messiah or Madman?] it is extremely polemical and very much tries to pull Hubbard to pieces." He added that Miller's book had "definitely exposed some inflated statements about Hubbard's early achievements," but the Church of Scientology has been able to counter a number of the points made by Miller: "Hubbard's assertions about his military career in WWII, e.g., have been much nearer to the truth than Miller is trying to show ... (a complete set of the relevant documents is part of my collection)." Miller states that he was unable to confirm the existence of Hubbard's mentor, Joseph "Snake" Thompson, but Frenschkowski confirms Hubbard's account that Thompson was an actual Commander in the US Navy Medical Corps and a personal friend of Sigmund Freud. Miller states that Hubbard was a disciple of Aleister Crowley, with the implication that Scientology derives from Crowley's teachings, but Frenschkowski concludes, "Nevertheless it remains quite obvious that Hubbard did not take much inspiration from Crowley and Parsons."

Writing in Kingdom of the Cults, an overview of new religious movements written from a Christian perspective, Walter Ralston Martin commented that of the various books on Hubbard's life, "none are so thoroughly damaging to his credentials" as Bare-Faced Messiah and Bent Corydon's book. The British science fiction author and critic David Langford rated Miller's book as "altogether more even-toned and better-written" and argued that it "deserves to be a standard reference" on the life of Hubbard. Sociologist David G. Bromley described the book as "among the most significant" accounts of Hubbard's life. Janet Reitman, who documented the history of Scientology in her 2011 book Inside Scientology: The Story of America's Most Secretive Religion, called Bare-Faced Messiah "the best and most comprehensive biography of L. Ron Hubbard."

Malise Ruthven observed in the Times Literary Supplement that Miller "forces no thesis on his readers, allowing them to draw their own conclusion from the facts he uncovers." He took this as both a strength and a weakness of the book, in that it leaves open the question of whether Hubbard was a deliberate con-man or sincerely deluded. He also expressed frustration that Miller had not explained how Hubbard had achieved such a following, but complimented the author's meticulous research in separating fact from fiction. The satirical magazine Private Eye described the book as "meticulously documented" but observed that the author "does not theorise, nor even very often moralise. The reader must provide his own interjections, laughter and gasps of astonishment."

The Sunday Times described the book as "admirably written, well documented and it must have entailed a great deal of painstaking research." It praised Miller for standing up to Scientologists' attempts to discredit him. The New Statesman praised Bare-Faced Messiah as accessibly written and diligently researched but, like Private Eye, criticised it for not illuminating why people find Scientology appealing. Patrick Skene Catling's review in The Spectator recommended the book "unreservedly", calling it "an unsurpassably scathing study of money-mad, power-mad megalomania." Peter Conrad, in The Observer, was generally complimentary about the book, but criticised Miller for omitting "the recognition of Hubbard's topicality. Miller treats him as a loony and a freak; in fact he was a morbid symptom of America itself". The psychologist and TV presenter Anthony Clare listed Bare-faced Messiah in The Times as one of his books of the year for 1987, commenting that it was "a testament to the gullibility of man in the face of the charlatanry of Scientology", while the film and literary critic Tom Hutchinson complimented Miller for "fascinatingly recount[ing]" what he described as Hubbard's "bizarre career."

In Canada, David Todd of news magazine Maclean's commended the way that Miller had "arriv[ed] at a portrait of [Scientology's] founder that is by turns hilarious and deeply unsettling", commenting that "while scathingly critical of Hubbard and his church, Bare-Faced Messiah is, in fact, scrupulously fair." Michael Harrison of the Toronto Financial Post criticised the book for "lack[ing] a critical perspective beyond the requisite snide commentary" and professed himself disappointed by Miller's avoidance of the question of whether Hubbard was "genuine or just a fraud", which Harrison considered an important omission "since the questions of selfishness, integrity and motivation are key issues in biographies of people who suffer from the messiah-complex.".

The Sydney Morning Herald's Judith White called the book "absorbing" and "well documented and graphically told." Alan Roberts wrote in the Adelaide Advertiser that Bare-Faced Messiah was a "minutely researched, densely evidenced account" of the "endless catalogue of deception, distortion and psychopathological mendacity" perpetrated by Hubbard and "almost tediously chronicled" by Miller. The Brisbane Sunday Mail's reviewer characterised the book as "entertaining reading that packs a mighty punch", in which the impact was delivered by "Miller's careful and professional research which is evident in the manner he builds the man up and then knocks him down, fact by fact."

The Oregon Law Review described Bare-Faced Messiah as "a revealing, enthralling biography of a controversial public figure." Charles Platt, writing in The Washington Post'', called the book "impressively thorough" though he chided Miller for "miss[ing] no opportunity to poke fun at Hubbard. Indeed, he belittles the man so thoroughly, the exercise almost begins to seem pointless." He noted that in advance of the publication of his review, the Church of Scientology had sent his newspaper "a large package of documents intending to refute many of Miller's statements." His review was subsequently disputed by the Church of Scientology International's vice president, Brian Anderson, who denounced the book in a letter to the newspaper, claiming that it had been "obviously calculated to make a quick buck capitalizing on L. Ron Hubbard's name" and was a "fast and shoddy" work. In response, Platt pointed out that "[Miller] does not dispute the success of L. Ron Hubbard's work; he merely presents evidence that suggests fraud. This is the point of Russell Miller's book, and I find it significant that Brian Anderson makes no attempt to answer it."

== Publication history ==
- 1987, UK, Michael Joseph (ISBN 978-0-7181-2764-0), First edition, Hardback
- 1987, Canada, Key Porter (ISBN 978-1-55013-027-0), Hardback
- 1988, United States, Henry Holt (ISBN 978-0-8050-0654-4), Hardback
- 1988, UK, Sphere Books (ISBN 978-0-7474-0332-6), Second edition, Paperback
- 1993, France, Plon (ISBN 978-2-259-02550-8) as Ron Hubbard : le gourou démasqué ("Ron Hubbard: the guru unmasked"), French translation by Sibylle Lang
- February 2014, UK, Silvertail Books (ISBN 978-1-909-26914-9), Third edition, Hardback

Serialisation

A summary of the book was published in the Arts & Leisure section of the Sunday Times over the course of three articles.

- "Science fictions". (1 November 1987)
- "Messiah at the Manor". (8 November 1987)
- "Farce and fear: in Scientology's private navy". (15 November 1987)

Extracts also appeared in The Weekend Australian and the Toronto Star.

Internet edition

- An Internet edition was put together in 1997 and widely mirrored, with Miller's permission and cooperation. Miller released several of his original interview transcripts to go with the release. These transcripts will be included in the 2014 third print edition of the book, intended to be an update to the internet version.

== See also ==
- Bibliography of books critical of Scientology
- Scientology controversies
- A Piece of Blue Sky, a 1990s book that overcame legal actions from Scientology
- The Road to Total Freedom, 1970s book by a British sociologist
- Scientology in the United Kingdom
