= New Era Publications International ApS v. Carol Publishing Group and Jonathan Caven-Atack =

Scientology copyright US appeals case

New Era Publications v. Carol Publishing Group
- Cover of the first edition, whose publication was stopped before the lifting of the injunction by New Era II
- Court: United States Court of Appeals for the Second Circuit
- Full case name: New Era Publications International, ApS v. Carol Publishing Group and Jonathan Caven-Atack
- Started: 2 April 1990
- Decided: 24 May 1990
- Citation: 904 F.2d 152; 58 USLW 2734; 14 U.S.P.Q.2d 2030; 1990 Copr. L. Dec. P 26,579; 17 Media L. Rep. 1913

Case history
- Appealed from: 729 F. Supp. 992 (S.D.N.Y. 1990)
- Appealed to: Supreme Court of the United States
- Subsequent action: Certiorari denied (498 U.S. 921)

Case opinions
- Decision by: Wilfred Feinberg, joined by George C. Pratt and John M. Walker Jr

New Era Publications International ApS v. Carol Publishing Group and Jonathan Caven-Atack (Note: Text of U.S. Court of Appeals for the Second Circuit, New Era Publications International ApS v. Carol Publishing Group and Jonathan Caven-Atack, 904 Federal Reporter 152 (1990) is available from: Justia OpenJurist) (1990), also known as New Era II, (Note: So titled as to distinguish it from a 1989 case, New Era I, brought by the same plaintiff concerning another biography of Hubbard, except this time against the publisher Henry Holt and Company: New Era Publications International, ApS, A Corporation of Denmark, v. Henry Holt and Company, Inc. (873 F.2d 576, 2d Cir. 1989), claiming copyright infringement by Russell Miller in Bare-Faced Messiah.) was a case in which the United States Court of Appeals for the Second Circuit held that the use of quotations from the works of L. Ron Hubbard in a critical biography of him, A Piece of Blue Sky, written by former Scientologist and academic Jon Atack, was legal fair use under the U.S. Copyright Act, allowing the publication to go forwards after it had been blocked by District Court for the Southern District of New York Judge Louis L. Stanton (729 F. Supp. 992).

The case arose when the publisher of the biography, Carol Publishing Group, was sued by New Era Publications (a subsidiary of the Church of Scientology), the exclusive licensee of Hubbard's works, for copyright infringement. The district court granted a permanent injunction pursuant to Fed. R. Civ. P. 65, ordering that "[A Piece of Blue Sky] may not be published in its present form", finding that the book's use of passages from Hubbard's published body of work were not protected "fair use" under 17 U.S.C. § 107.

The Second Circuit reversed the District Court for the Southern District of New York's decision, authored by Judge Louis L. Stanton, revoking his injunction and ruling that all four fair use factors as enumerated in § 107 favored Carol Publishing Group, and that its use was fair. The court held that the book was a critical biography, and thus fit "comfortably within" the statutory categories of uses illustrative of uses that can be fair. The court also held that the author's use of material "to enrich" his biography was protected fair use, even though "[the] publisher anticipate[s] profits." Finally, the court held that the book's use of Hubbard's works did not have any effect on the market for the copyrighted works: indeed, the court noted that the book was just as likely to increase the market for Hubbard's works; and even were such economic harm to occur, it:

would not result from unfair infringement forbidden by the copyright laws, but rather from a convincing work that effectively criticizes Hubbard, the very type of work that the Copyright Act was designed to protect and encourage.

— New Era v. Carol Publishing Grp. (1990)

Judge Wilfred Feinberg wrote the opinion of the Court; he was joined in it by fellow circuit judges George C. Pratt and John M. Walker Jr.

== Legacy ==
The court's decision has been cited by other courts in discussions of the issue of fair use in U.S. copyright law. As a favorable decision for authors, it was cited by the petitioners in Andy Warhol Fdn. v. Goldsmith.

Response to the decision among academics has been more negative as the decision's sweeping effects on unpublished manuscripts created unique challenges for archivists and librarians: by creating a legal difference between published and unpublished works, even if the unpublished works are available freely in libraries or other archives, New Era, along with Salinger, have created legal issues for historians.

== See also ==
- Harper & Row, Publishers, Inc., et al. v. Nation Enterprises, et al., 471 U.S. 539 (1985)
- Salinger v. Random House, Inc., 811 F.2d 90 (2d Cir. 1987)
