= Pseudobiography of L. Ron Hubbard =

Church of Scientology hagiography

Scientology founder L. Ron Hubbard made a number of false claims about his life and background. His estranged son Ronald DeWolf (Nibs) reported that "Ninety-nine percent of what my father ever wrote or said about himself" was false. An acquaintance who knew Hubbard in Pasadena recalled recognizing Hubbard's epic autobiographical tales as being adapted from the writings of others. (Note: "He claimed he was in England, in the "Royal Museum", going down this hall, and three scientists came walking out of an office, spotted him, grabbed him and took him into office and started measuring his skull, saying this was a perfect example of whatever it was and then pushing him out without a word. I said, "gee, that's a hell of a great story, except I think I read that in George Bernard Shaw." Another time he told a story of being in the Aleutians in command of a destroyer and came near some ice [floes] and a polar bear jumped onto the ship chasing everyone around. It's another good story that Cory Ford wrote in his book about the Aleutians.") In October 1984, an American judge issued a ruling, writing of Hubbard that "The evidence portrays a man who has been virtually a pathological liar when it comes to his history, background and achievements."

== Family and childhood ==
Hagiographical accounts published by the Church of Scientology describe Hubbard as "a child prodigy of sorts" who rode a horse before he could walk and was able to read and write by the age of four. A Scientology profile says that he was brought up on his grandfather's "large cattle ranch in Montana" where he spent his days "riding, breaking broncos, hunting coyote and taking his first steps as an explorer". His grandfather is described as a "wealthy Western cattleman" from whom Hubbard "inherited his fortune and family interests in America, Southern Africa, etc."

In the Church of Scientology publication What is Scientology?, Hubbard's mother Ledora is described as "a rarity in her time. A thoroughly educated woman, who had attended teacher's college prior to her marriage to Ron's father, she was aptly suited to tutor her young son." Christensen comments that this presentation of the exceptional qualities of his mother is typical of hagiographies – such as the Virgin Mary – and forms a kind of after-the-event rationalization, in which qualities assigned to the subject are also attributed to the subject's mother. Presenting Ledora as "aptly suited" to educate her son suggests that she was, in effect, chosen to be his mother; she is not presented as responsible for stimulating her son's interest in the classics but was there simply to assist his development. Indeed, as Christiansen notes, his parents do not have important roles in his official biography and are only significantly mentioned at the beginning of the story, where their respective professions are emphasized.

Hubbard's official biographers also state that, during his childhood in Montana, he was befriended by "Old Tom", a medicine man from the Native American Blackfeet tribe. He is also purported to have become, at six years old, "one of the few whites ever admitted into Blackfoot society as a bona fide blood brother". This has been disputed by his unofficial biographers. Jon Atack notes that the Blackfoot reservation was over a hundred miles away from Helena. A Los Angeles Times investigation in 1990 reported that "Old Tom" was not listed in a 1907 register of the Blackfeet and that the tribe did not practice blood brotherhood. Although the Church of Scientology states that Hubbard was awarded blood brotherhood "in a ceremony that is still recalled by tribal elders", a Scientologist of fractional Blackfoot ancestry sought during the mid-1980s to prove that Hubbard had been a Blackfoot blood brother but was unsuccessful.

Some early Scientology biographies present a fictitious family heritage for Hubbard. According to an account published in the Church of Scientology's Ability magazine in 1959, Hubbard was "descended from Count de Loup who entered England with the Norman invasion and became the founder of the English de Wolfe family which emigrated to America in the 17th century. On his father's side, from the English Hubbards, who came to America in the 19th century." The story went that Count de Loup (or de Loupe) was a French courtier who saved the King of France from an attack by a wolf; the grateful monarch bestowed the title of Count de Loupe, which was eventually anglicized to "De Wolf", the name of Hubbard's maternal grandfather. No records exist to substantiate this story. Harry Ross Hubbard was an orphan, born Henry August Wilson in August 1886, who had been adopted by an Iowa farming couple by the name of Hubbard. The couple changed his given names to Harry Ross.

However, contemporary records show that his grandfather, Lafayette Waterbury, was a veterinarian, not a rancher, and was not wealthy. Hubbard was actually raised in a townhouse in the center of Helena. According to his aunt, his family did not own a ranch but did own one cow and four or five horses on a few acres of land outside the city. While some sources support Scientology's claim of Hubbard's blood brotherhood, other sources say that the tribe did not practice blood brotherhood and no evidence has been found that he had ever been a Blackfeet blood brother.

== Early life ==
According to Scientology biographies, during a journey to Washington, D.C., in 1923 Hubbard learned of Freudian psychology from Commander Joseph "Snake" Thompson, a U.S. Navy psychoanalyst and medic. Scientology biographies describe this encounter as giving Hubbard training in a particular scientific approach to the mind, which he found unsatisfying. In his diary, Hubbard claimed he was the youngest Eagle Scout in the U.S. A Scientology biography states that Hubbard's achievement of Eagle Scout status was "an early indication that he did not plan to live an ordinary life." Christiansen notes that this passage implies that Hubbard consciously "planned" to live an extraordinary life, strengthening the underlying idea that from early childhood he worked towards the goals that led to Scientology. He was presented to President Calvin Coolidge in a ceremony that the Church of Scientology describes as Hubbard having "represented American Scouting at the White House", by which time "the thirteen-year-old L. Ron Hubbard had become a reasonably famous figure in fairly adventurous circles." Atack describes the event more prosaically as a meet-and-greet in which Hubbard was one of forty boys who spoke their names to the President and shook his hand. Another Scientology biography says that Hubbard became "the fast friend of the President's son, Calvin Coolidge, Jr., whose untimely death is probably responsible for L. Ron Hubbard's early interest in healing research." Atack deems this fictitious, as Calvin Coolidge Jr. and Hubbard never crossed paths.

Scientology texts present Hubbard's travels in Asia as a time when he was intensely curious for answers to human suffering and explored ancient Eastern philosophies for answers, but found them lacking. He is described as traveling to China "at a time when few Westerners could enter" and according to Scientology, spent his time questioning Buddhist lamas and meeting old Chinese magicians. According to church materials, his travels were funded by his "wealthy grandfather".

Scientology accounts say that Hubbard "made his way deep into Manchuria's Western Hills and beyond — to break bread with Mongolian bandits, share campfires with Siberian shamans and befriend the last in the line of magicians from the court of Kublai Khan". However, Hubbard did not record these events in his diary. He remained unimpressed with China and the Chinese, writing: "A Chinaman can not live up to a thing, he always drags it down." He characterized the sights of Beijing as "rubberneck stations" for tourists and described the palaces of the Forbidden City as "very trashy-looking" and "not worth mentioning". He was impressed by the Great Wall of China near Beijing, but concluded of the Chinese: "They smell of all the baths they didn't take. The trouble with China is, there are too many chinks here."

The Danish historian of religions Dorthe Refslund Christensen notes that many aspects of the official version of Hubbard's early life parallel more conventional religious narratives, notably the life of Jesus. Many details of Hubbard's early life remain disputed; critics of Scientology cast doubt on whether he had the educational and personal background claimed by the Church of Scientology. According to James R. Lewis and Olav Hammer, in Scientology, this hagiographic "construction of Hubbard as a religious ideal implies the construction of Scientology's texts as humanity's most important treasure and vice versa." Religious tradition in Scientology is based on two essential things, Hubbard's individuality and texts written by him.

== University ==
Despite not graduating from George Washington, Hubbard claimed "to be not only a graduate engineer, but 'a member of the first United States course in formal education in what is called today nuclear physics.'" However, a Church of Scientology biography describes him as "never noted for being in class" and says that he "thoroughly detest[ed] his subjects". He earned poor grades, was placed on probation in September 1931 and dropped out altogether in the fall of 1932. Hubbard is noted as once being offered a research job at the Soviet-American trade organization Amtorg.

Scientology accounts say that he "studied nuclear physics at George Washington University in Washington, D.C., before he started his studies about the mind, spirit and life" and Hubbard himself stated that he "set out to find out from nuclear physics a knowledge of the physical universe, something entirely lacking in Asian philosophy". His university records indicate that his exposure to "nuclear physics" consisted of one class in "atomic and molecular phenomena" for which he earned an "F" grade.

Scientologists claim he was more interested in extracurricular activities, particularly writing and flying. According to church materials, "he earned his wings as a pioneering barnstormer at the dawn of American aviation" and was "recognized as one of the country's most outstanding pilots. With virtually no training time, he takes up powered flight and barnstorms throughout the Midwest." His airman certificate, however, records that he qualified to fly only gliders rather than powered aircraft and gave up his certificate when he could not afford the renewal fee.

After leaving university Hubbard traveled to Puerto Rico on what the Church of Scientology calls the "Puerto Rican Mineralogical Expedition". Scientologists claim he "made the first complete mineralogical survey of Puerto Rico" as a means of "augmenting his Lieutenant's pay with a mining venture", during which he "sluiced inland rivers and crisscrossed the island in search of elusive gold" as well as carrying out "much ethnological work amongst the interior villages and native hillsmen". Hubbard's unofficial biographer Russell Miller writes that neither the United States Geological Survey nor the Puerto Rican Department of Natural Resources have any record of any such expedition.

== Hollywood ==
According to the Church of Scientology, Hubbard was "called to Hollywood" to work on film scripts in the mid-1930s, although Scientology accounts differ as to exactly when this was (whether 1935, 1936 or 1937). The Church of Scientology claims he also worked on the Columbia serials The Mysterious Pilot (1937), The Great Adventures of Wild Bill Hickok (1938) and The Spider Returns (1941), though his name does not appear on the credits. Hubbard also claimed to have written Dive Bomber (1941), Cecil B. DeMille's The Plainsman (1936) and John Ford's Stagecoach (1939).

Scientology accounts of the expedition to Alaska describe "Hubbard's recharting of an especially treacherous Inside Passage, and his ethnological study of indigenous Aleuts and Haidas" and tell of how "along the way, he not only roped a Kodiak Bear, but braved seventy-mile-an-hour winds and commensurate seas off the Aleutian Islands." They are divided about how far Hubbard's expedition actually traveled, whether 700 miles (1,100 km) or 2,000 miles (3,200 km).

== Military career ==
The Church of Scientology disputes the official record of Hubbard's naval career. It asserts that the records are incomplete and perhaps falsified "to conceal Hubbard's secret activities as an intelligence officer". In 1990 the Church of Scientology provided the Los Angeles Times with a document that was said to be a copy of Hubbard's official record of service. The U.S. Navy told the Times, "its contents are not supported by Hubbard's personnel record." The New Yorker reported in February 2011 that the Scientology document was considered by federal archivists to be a forgery.

The Church of Scientology presents him as a "much-decorated war hero who commanded a corvette and during hostilities was crippled and wounded". Scientology publications say he served as a "Commodore of Corvette squadrons" in "all five theaters of World War II" and was awarded "twenty-one medals and palms" for his service. He was "severely wounded and was taken crippled and blinded" to a military hospital, where he "worked his way back to fitness, strength and full perception in less than two years, using only what he knew and could determine about Man and his relationship to the universe". A. E. van Vogt recounted that Hubbard had seen combat repeatedly, and that he had once sailed his ship "right into the harbor of a Japanese occupied island in the Dutch East Indies. His attitude was that if you took your flag down the Japanese would not know one boat from another, so he tied up at the dock, went ashore and wandered around by himself for three days."

Hubbard's war service has great significance in the history and mythology of the Church of Scientology, as he is said to have cured himself through techniques that would later underpin Scientology and Dianetics. According to Moulton, Hubbard told him that he had been machine-gunned in the back near the Dutch East Indies. Hubbard asserted that his eyes had been damaged as well, either "by the flash of a large-caliber gun" or when he had "a bomb go off in my face". Scientology texts say that he returned from the war "[b]linded with injured optic nerves, and lame with physical injuries to hip and back" and was twice pronounced dead. Hubbard's official Navy service records indicate that "his military performance was, at times, substandard" and he received only four campaign medals rather than the claimed twenty-one. He was never recorded as being injured or wounded in combat and never received a Purple Heart.

According to the Church of Scientology, Hubbard's key breakthrough in the development of Dianetics was made at Oak Knoll Naval Hospital in Oakland, California:

In early 1945, while recovering from war injuries at Oak Knoll Naval Hospital, Mr. Hubbard conducts a series of tests and experiments dealing with the endocrine system. He discovers that, contrary to long-standing beliefs, function monitors structure. With this revolutionary advance, he begins to apply his theories to the field of the mind and thereby to improve the conditions of others.

Scientology accounts do not mention Hubbard's involvement in occultism. He is instead described as "continu[ing] to write to help support his research" during this period into "the development of a means to better the condition of man". The Church of Scientology has nonetheless acknowledged Hubbard's involvement with the Ordo Templi Orientis; a 1969 statement, written by Hubbard himself, said:

Hubbard broke up black magic in America ... L. Ron Hubbard was still an officer of the U.S. Navy, because he was well known as a writer and a philosopher and had friends amongst the physicists, he was sent in to handle the situation. He went to live at the house and investigated the black magic rites and the general situation and found them very bad ... Hubbard's mission was successful far beyond anyone's expectations. The house was torn down. Hubbard rescued a girl they were using. The black magic group was dispersed and destroyed and has never recovered.

The Church of Scientology says Hubbard was "sent in" by his fellow science fiction author Robert A. Heinlein, "who was running off-book intelligence operations for naval intelligence at the time". However, Heinlein's authorized biographer has said that he looked into the matter at the suggestion of Scientologists but found nothing to corroborate claims that Heinlein had been involved, and his biography of Heinlein makes no mention of the matter.

The Church of Scientology says Hubbard quit the Navy because it "attempted to monopolize all his researches and force him to work on a project 'to make man more suggestible' and when he was unwilling, tried to blackmail him by ordering him back to active duty to perform this function. Having many friends he was able to instantly resign from the Navy and escape this trap." The Navy said in a statement in 1980: "There is no evidence on record of an attempt to recall him to active duty."

== Scientology biographies ==
Following Hubbard's death, Bridge Publications published several stand-alone biographical accounts of his life. Marco Frenschkowski notes that "non-Scientologist readers immediately recognize some parts of Hubbard's life are here systematically left out: no information whatsoever is given about his private life (his marriages, divorces, children), his legal affairs and so on." The Church of Scientology maintains an extensive website presenting the official version of Hubbard's life. It also owns a number of properties dedicated to Hubbard including the Los Angeles-based L. Ron Hubbard Life Exhibition (a presentation of Hubbard's life), the Author Services Center (a presentation of Hubbard's writings), and every Scientology organization maintains an office for Hubbard.

In late 2012, Bridge published a comprehensive official biography of Hubbard, titled The L. Ron Hubbard Series: A Biographical Encyclopedia, written primarily by Dan Sherman, the official Hubbard biographer at the time. This most recent official Church of Scientology biography of Hubbard is a 17 volume series, with each volume focusing on a different aspect of Hubbard's life, including his music, photography, geographic exploration, humanitarian work, and nautical career. It is advertised as a "Biographic Encyclopedia" and is primarily authored by the official biographer, Dan Sherman.
