= The Road to Total Freedom =

Book by Roy Wallis

- Cover
- Author: Roy Wallis
- Language: English
- Subject: Scientology
- Genre: Non-fiction
- Publisher: Heinemann
- Publication date: 1976
- Publication place: United States
- Media type: Print (Hardcover)
- Pages: 282
- ISBN: 0-231-04200-0
- Preceded by: Sectarianism
- Followed by: Culture and Curing

The Road to Total Freedom: A Sociological Analysis of Scientology is a non-fiction book about Scientology by sociologist Roy Wallis. Originally published in 1976 by Heinemann, it was republished in 1977 by Columbia University Press. The original manuscript was the product of Wallis's doctoral research at Oxford under the tutelage of Bryan Wilson. Wallis, after a review of the original manuscript by Scientology leaders, made edits to about 100 passages before publication.

In the book, Wallis first analyzes the degree to which the Church of Scientology views itself as legitimate, as well as to what degree external society regarded the organization as "respectable" or "deviant". Furthermore, he provides a contextual history of the organization, including a discussion of the Dianetics movement founded by L. Ron Hubbard. Next, Wallis discusses the appeal of the Scientology practice of Auditing, and compares this to abreaction therapy. And finally, he examines how Scientology shifted from a cult to a sect in structure, and analyzes the authoritarian nature of the management of the organization.

While Wallis was researching the book, the Guardian's Office, Scientology's intelligence agency, investigated him. They assigned an individual as an undercover agent who pretended to be a student at the University of Stirling, where he was teaching. The agent inquired if Wallis was involved with illegal drugs. Wallis later discovered forged letters purportedly sent by him and designed to implicate him in controversial acts. Wallis assumed this was a reaction by the Guardian's Office to The Road to Total Freedom.

The Road to Total Freedom received generally positive reception in book reviews and media coverage. The Encyclopedia of Religion and Society acknowledged Wallis "displayed characteristic skill" in bringing a large amount of information together in an analysis of Scientology. Similarly, Choice: Current Reviews for Academic Libraries described the author's research as "substantively important", and Library Journal called it "a sociological analysis for the serious student, with all the appropriate scholarly apparatus".

== Research ==
Wallis completed his doctoral studies under Bryan Wilson at the University of Oxford. The author's research into new religious movements began in the 1970s with study of the Church of Scientology. He had performed research on the subject of Scientology for his doctoral thesis; this was later printed as The Road to Total Freedom in 1976. Wallis' study of Scientology also led to an article by Wallis in the Sociological Yearbook of Religion in Britain.

The research began with an attempt at participant observation: Wallis enrolled in a "Communications Course" in Scientology's facility at Saint Hill Manor, but left after two days because he was not willing to lie about his reaction to the course content. To collect further data, Wallis circulated a survey by post and reviewed Scientology's extensive published material. He also interviewed current and former members, including Helen Parsons Smith, a former sister-in-law of Scientology founder L. Ron Hubbard.

After Wallis had finished the initial manuscript for The Road to Total Freedom, he provided representatives of Scientology leadership with a copy. Wallis negotiated with the Scientology leaders, and it was agreed upon that certain sections of the book would be edited. In total, approximately 100 sections of the book were edited due to input from Scientology leaders. This fact was not made public at the time of the book's publication.

== Content ==
In the book, Wallis brings together a significant amount of information and presents an analysis of the church-sect structure which simultaneously exhibited a denomination-cult pattern. The book presents a critical analysis of Scientology. Wallis introduces an argument that individuals were intrigued by the Church of Scientology for two reasons: the level with which the organization viewed itself as a sincere structure, and the degree to which the external society saw Scientology as "respectable" as opposed to "deviant" in nature.

The Road to Total Freedom begins with a history of Scientology, then explores it within a context of a belief system, organizational structure, and form of social control. Wallis then describes how Scientology founder L. Ron Hubbard "asserted the originality of the entire theory and practice and acknowledges having been influenced only in a most general way by other writers". He next compares the Scientology practice of Auditing to that of abreaction therapy – a process where repressed memories are unearthed, usually through hypnosis, to aid improving the mental well-being of a patient.

The author goes on to explain how individuals were attracted to Dianetics, the precursor to Scientology. Wallis notes, "[Dianetics] offered a rationale for failure in social mobility and in social interaction. It provided an explanation in terms of traumatic incidents in which the individual had been unwittingly involved, and thereby relieved him of responsibility for his failure." Scientologists who participated in a questionnaire for Wallis' research identified areas of their life that they hoped Scientology would improve, including: loneliness, financial difficulties, marital issues, other interpersonal relationships, psychological problems, and physical illness. Wallis describes Hubbard's thought process to turn his methodology of Dianetics into a religion, noting, "Hubbard's theory and techniques had been moving increasingly in this direction". Wallis notes how Scientology became a focus for those previously involved in the Dianetics movement. Wallis points out that Hubbard instructed members of Scientology not to immediately tell new followers about methodologies that might be less familiar to some, such as belief in the existence of prior lives.

Wallis then continues his argument regarding the transitional period the organization underwent, and describes how Scientology has transformed from a cult to a sect, and explains patterns of membership and leaving the group. He delves into the structure of authoritarian managerial control of the organization, which is seen to have developed as a result of perceived problems in society. He characterizes the "Org" management system in Scientology as "an elaborate and imposing bureaucratic structure". Wallis describes a process referred to as "deviance amplification", and analyzes how individuals maintain perceptions of reality within a deviant belief system. He notes that individual believers in Scientology methodologies are kept within the organization by management techniques which shield members from external society. Wallis posits that exposure of members of the Church of Scientology to a reality external to the organization presents "a major challenge to the legitimacy or validity of their definition of reality".

Unusually for a sociological study, the book features a rebuttal from a believing member of the organisation; a fellow sociologist called J. L. Simmons. He criticises many of Wallis' procedures and conclusions, saying that these alleged errors are "indicative of either a decline in scholastic method or are deliberate and malicious." Simmons invites the reader to compare The Road to Total Freedom against Hubbard's Dianetics: The Modern Science of Mental Health, asking which is more "alive and hopeful and scientifically objective".

== Scientology's response ==
Author Stewart Lamont writes in Religion Inc. that while Wallis was researching the book, individuals from the Scientology intelligence agency called the Guardian's Office investigated the author. Alan E. Aldridge notes in his book Religion in the Contemporary World: A Sociological Introduction, "Roy Wallis gave graphic accounts of attempts by members of the Church of Scientology to discredit him personally and professionally, and to subvert or suppress his research findings."

An undercover agent for Scientology went to the University of Stirling, where Wallis was a teacher. The individual pretended to be a student, and asked Wallis if he was involved with illegal drugs. Wallis recognized the individual from the Scientology facility Saint Hill Manor, and the agent switched his cover and then asserted that he was actually a defector from Scientology. In a 1977 article in Doing Sociological Research titled "The Moral Career of a Research Project", Wallis details what occurred after this incident, "In the weeks following his visit a number of forged letters came to light, some of which were supposedly written by me. These letters sent to my university employers, colleagues and others, implicated me in a variety of acts from a homosexual love affair to spying for the drug squad. Because I had few enemies and because this attention followed so closely upon the receipt of my paper by the Church of Scientology organization, it did not seem too difficult to infer the source of these attempts to inconvenience me." According to Lamont, as of the publication of Religion Inc. in 1986, "the book is now accepted by the Public Affairs office of the Church of Scientology as reasonable and fair", and he was provided a copy of the book from the organization itself.

== Reception ==
In his book The Social Dimensions of Sectarianism: Sects and New Religious Movements in Contemporary Society, Wallis' former mentor Bryan R. Wilson described The Road to Total Freedom as "A thorough study of the early development and organization of Scientology". The Encyclopedia of Religion and Society noted that Wallis "displayed characteristic skill in assimilating and simplifying a large amount of diverse material into a parsimonious reworking of the classic church-sect typology". Writing in The Future of Religion: Secularization, Revival and Cult Formation, authors Rodney Stark and William Sims Bainbridge characterized the book as "the first major scholarly study of Scientology".

A review in Religious Studies describes the book as "a convenient and in many respects convincing account of the history of Scientology." However, it comments that Wallis "does not really succeed in the formidable task of giving the reader a rounded picture of what it is like to be a believing member of the Org[anisation]. His analysis, like its subject matter, is rather mechanical and follows a particular pattern." The review observes that Wallis did not explore the parallels between Dianetics and B. F. Skinner's psychological theories, nor between the screening processes used in Scientology and in Communist China. It recommends that the book would have been more interesting if it had compared its subject with initiation rites, including those of Freemasonry. It dismisses as "facile" the book's background material on secularization and religious schisms.

Choice: Current Reviews for Academic Libraries noted of the book's research, "The study is substantively important and theoretically grounded". The review noted the book had a "good bibliography", and concluded that the book be "recommended for academic libraries." Library Journal compared the book to Scientology by author George Malko, but commented that The Road to Total Freedom is "a much more scholarly, documented work". Library Journal concluded, "The record – often a chilling one – speaks for itself. Not a polemic nor a popular treatment, this is a sociological analysis for the serious student, with all the appropriate scholarly apparatus."

A review in The Times Literary Supplement commented, "this is a most informative, candid and valuable book". Writing in Quill, published by the Society of Professional Journalists, Robert Vaughn Young commented, "Perhaps because this is a sociological study of Scientology, this is a cold, calm, academic dissection of the subject and Hubbard." The California Court of Appeal cited the book as a reference in a decision relating to a criminal defendant who was a member of Scientology. When Wallis died in 1990, his obituary in The Independent noted that The Road to Total Freedom "still stands as a classic of good field research".

== See also ==
- A Piece of Blue Sky – 1990 book about Scientology and Dianetics
- Bare-faced Messiah – Biography of L. Ron Hubbard
- Scientology and the legal system – Church of Scientology legal cases
- Scientology controversies
- Bibliography of books critical of Scientology
