= Foster Report =

1971 report on Scientology in UK

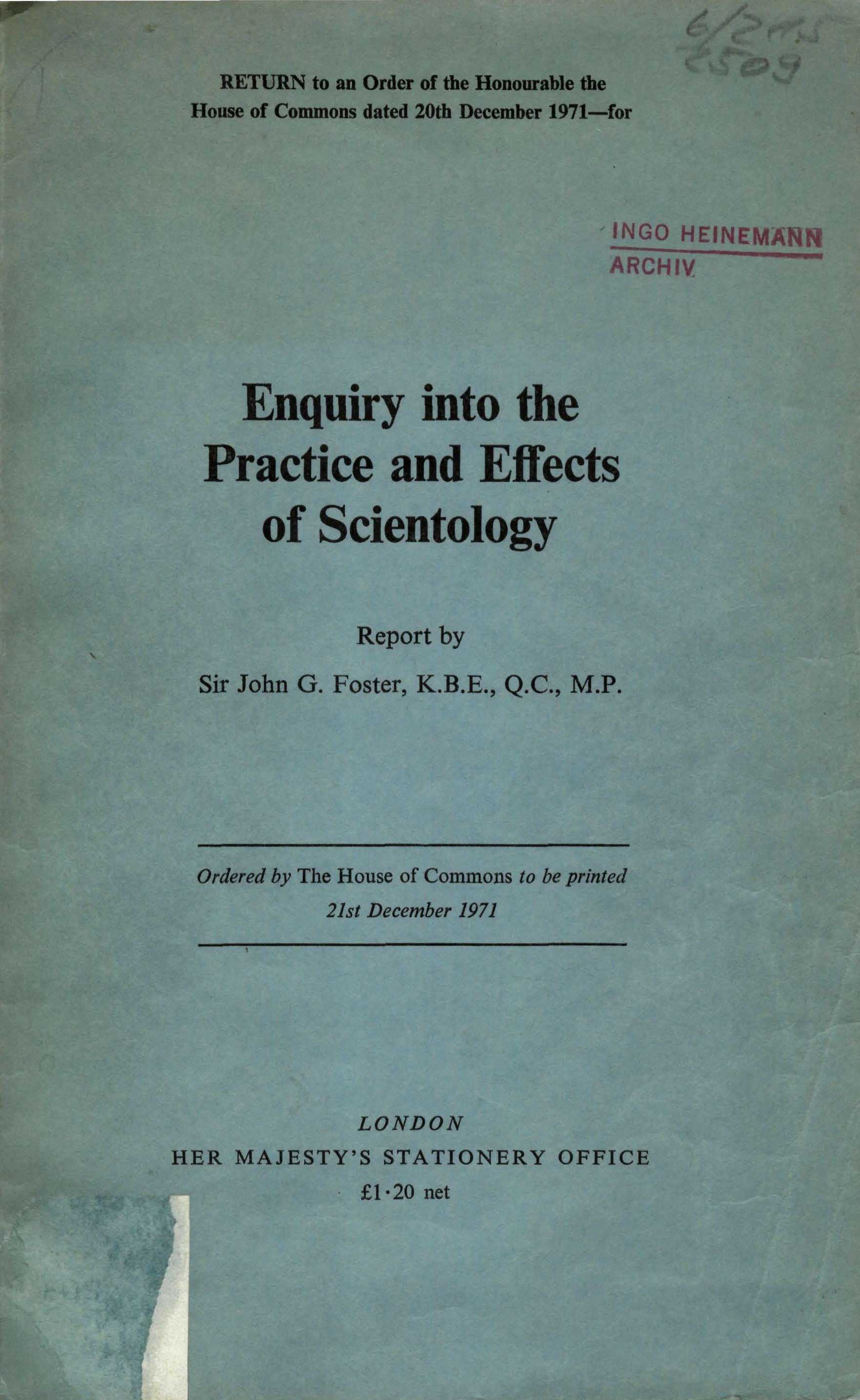

The Foster Report is a 1971 report titled Enquiry into the Practice and Effects of Scientology, written by Sir John Foster for the government of the United Kingdom, regarding the Church of Scientology. The report made its case with L. Ron Hubbard's own words and reprinted a number of the Church's internal Ethics Orders. It did not ban Scientology outright, but asked for legislation to ensure that psychotherapy in the United Kingdom is "a restricted profession open only to those who undergo an appropriate training and are willing to adhere to a proper code of ethics," and that the Scientology ethics and justice system did not meet such criteria.

Documents seized by the FBI in raids on the Church's US headquarters in July 1977 revealed that an agent had been sent to investigate Sir John Foster in an attempt to link him to Paulette Cooper, author of The Scandal of Scientology and victim of Operation Freakout. The documents showed that Lord Balniel, who had requested the official inquiry, was also a target. Hubbard had written, "get a detective on that lord's past to unearth the tit-bits".

Several official inquiries were made into Scientology in England, Australia, and elsewhere, and a number of reports were published by respective governments in the late sixties and early seventies.

== See also ==
- Scientology in the United Kingdom
- Believe What You Like: What happened between the Scientologists and the National Association for Mental Health
- Kenneth Robinson
- Other government reports into Scientology:
  - Anderson Report (Australia)
  - Dumbleton-Powles Report (New Zealand)
  - The Lee Report (Canada)
