= Roy Wallis =

Critic of Scientology (1945–1990)

Roy Wallis (1945–1990) was a sociologist and Dean of the Faculty of Economics and Social Sciences at the Queen's University Belfast. He is mostly known for his creation of the seven signs that differentiate a religious congregation from a sectarian church, which he created while researching the Church of Scientology. He introduced the distinction between world-affirming and world-rejecting new religious movements.

After publishing his book The Road to Total Freedom (1976), an analysis of the sociology of Scientology, he was harassed by the church both legally and personally. Forged letters, apparently from Wallis, were sent to his colleagues.

== Publications ==
- Roy Wallis (1975) Sectarianism: Analyses of Religious and Non-Religious Sects, London: Peter Owen & New York: John Wiley, ISBN 0470919108
- Roy Wallis (1976) The Road to Total Freedom: A Sociological Analysis of Scientology, London: Heinemann. ISBN 0435829165. US edition published 1977 by Columbia University Press, ISBN 0231042000
- Roy Wallis and Peter Morley (1976) Marginal Medicine, New York: Free Press, ISBN 0029337402
- Roy Wallis and Peter Morley (1978) Culture and Curing: Anthropological Perspectives on Traditional Medical Beliefs and Practices, Pittsburgh: University of Pittsburgh Press, & London: Peter Owen, ISBN 0822953250
- Roy Wallis (1979) On the Margins of Science: the Social Construction of Rejected Knowledge, Keele: University of Keele Press, ISBN 0904425061
- Roy Wallis (1979) Salvation and Protest: Studies of Social and Religious Movements, New York: St. Martin's Press, ISBN 0312698348
- Roy Wallis (1984) The Elementary Forms of the New Religious Life, London and Boston: Routledge and Kegan Paul, ISBN 0710098901
