= A Piece of Blue Sky =

1990 book about Scientology and Dianetics

- Author: Jon Atack
- Language: English
- Subject: Scientology
- Genre: Non-fiction
- Publisher: Lyle Stuart Books, Carol Publishing Group
- Publication date: August 19, 1990; 2013 (republished)
- Publication place: United Kingdom, United States
- Media type: Print (Hardcover)
- Pages: 448
- ISBN: 081840499X
- OCLC: 20934706
- Dewey Decimal: 299/.936/092 20

A Piece of Blue Sky: Scientology, Dianetics and L. Ron Hubbard Exposed is a 1990 book about L. Ron Hubbard and the development of Dianetics and Scientology, authored by British former Scientologist Jon Atack. It was republished in 2013 with the title Let's sell these people A Piece of Blue Sky: Hubbard, Dianetics and Scientology. The title originates from a quote of Hubbard from 1950: an associate of Hubbard's noted him saying that he wanted to sell potential members "a piece of blue sky".

The work has been reviewed favourably by academics in sociology and the history of new religious movements. A review in the Marburg Journal of Religion called it "the most thorough general history of Hubbard and Scientology". Stephen A. Kent, a professor of sociology who researches new religious movements, described the work as "an unrivalled piece of superb scholarship".

The Scientology organisation's publishing arm, New Era Publications, unsuccessfully tried to prevent the book's publication, having argued that it infringed on its copyright of Hubbard's works. The US district court in New York ruled against publication of the version of the book that included excerpts from Hubbard's writings, but the decision was overturned by the federal US Court of Appeals for the Second Circuit in New Era Publications International ApS v. Carol Publishing Group and Jonathan Caven-Atack.

== Synopsis ==
The book is arranged into nine parts, plus introductory material. In part 1, Atack describes his personal experience in the Scientology organisation. Parts 2 – 8 provide a chronological history of L. Ron Hubbard, Dianetics and Scientology, researched from paper sources and interviews. The final part draws conclusions about the belief system of Scientology and its founder. The book also contains a preface by Russell Miller, author of Bare-faced Messiah.

== Reception ==
Marco Frenschkowski, writing in the Marburg Journal of Religion in 1999, describes A Piece of Blue Sky as "the most thorough general history of Hubbard and Scientology, very bitter, but always well-researched." It has been widely used as a source in scholarship, and is cited in several academic publications. The Tampa Tribune-Times said that Atack's provision of extensive detail and source notes for each claim sometimes gets in the way of the story, but prevents the book from being just another bitter diatribe against Scientology.

When republished in 2013, the sociologist Stephen A. Kent called the book "an unrivalled piece of superb scholarship...All future scholarship on Scientology will build upon his contribution."

== Jon Atack ==
Jon Atack (born Jonathan Caven-Atack in 1955) is a British author and artist who is widely recognized as one of the most informed critics of the Church of Scientology. He joined Scientology at the age of nineteen in 1974, and was based largely in the Church of Scientology's British headquarters at Saint Hill Manor in England. During his training, he said he progressed to Scientology's Operating Thetan level 5 (OT5), completing 24 of the 27 levels of progress within Scientology.

He left the organisation in 1983, disillusioned with the new leadership of David Miscavige who had taken over in the early 1980s. He wrote that he saw the new management as tough and ruthless, and objected particularly to the 15-fold increase in training fees. He also objected to being told not to have relationships with so-called "suppressive persons", meaning those whom the Scientology organisation had declared enemies with whom members should not communicate.

=== Works ===
Jon Atack's work has frequently been cited as a source in academic publications. A notable example is the 2009 volume Scientology, in which Atack's scholarship is cited by several contributors. Atack is the author of:

- Atack, Jon (1990). A Piece of Blue Sky: Scientology, Dianetics, and L. Ron Hubbard Exposed. Carol Publishing. ISBN 9780818404993.
- The Total Freedom Trap: Scientology, Dianetics and L. Ron Hubbard. 1992. OCLC 34443736.
- Atack, Jon (2013). Let's Sell These People A Piece of Blue Sky: Hubbard, Dianetics and Scientology. Richard Woods. ISBN 9781482023039.
- Atack, Jon (2014). Scientology: The Cult of Greed. CreateSpace Independent Publishing Platform. ISBN 9781505490121.
- Atack, Jon (2016). Opening Minds: The Secret World of Manipulation, Undue Influence and Brainwashing. Trentvalley Limited. ISBN 9780997109634.
- Atack, Jon (2021). Opening Our Minds: Avoiding Abusive Relationships and Authoritarian Groups. Trentvalley Limited. ISBN 9781919625805.
- Atack, Jon (2025). If Scientology Ruled the World: Nazi Occultists, Sex Magick, Space Aliens, and the Second Coming. Independently published. ISBN 9798264753671.

== Legal action ==
In 1990, Scientology's publishing arm, New Era Publications, attempted to prevent publication by arguing that the manuscript's inclusion of material by Hubbard infringed on their copyright of Hubbard's work, and would harm sales of the original texts. The court ruled that the manuscript might discourage people from buying Hubbard's books by convincing them he was a swindler, and that copyright law protects rather than forbids this kind of criticism. Before the outcome of the case was known, the publisher prepared two versions of the book: one with and one without Hubbard's quoted material. After publication, Scientologists picketed Atack's East Grinstead home for six days and spread defamatory leaflets around his neighbourhood.

In April 1995, a court in England held that Atack had libelled Margaret Hodkin, the headmistress of Scientology's Greenfields School in England, and issued an injunction forbidding publication of an offending paragraph. The decision was upheld by the High Court in London in May 1995. The case led Amazon to remove the book from its listings in February 1999, but it reversed its decision a few months later after customers complained.

== See also ==
- Brainwashing
- Scientology controversies
- Bibliography of books critical of Scientology
