= Religion Inc. =

1986 book by Stewart Lamont

- Book cover
- Author: Stewart Lamont
- Language: English
- Subject: Scientology
- Genre: Non-fiction
- Publisher: Harrap, London
- Publication date: June 1986
- Publication place: United Kingdom
- Media type: Print (Hardcover)
- Pages: 192
- ISBN: 9780245543340
- OCLC: 23079677
- Dewey Decimal: 299/.936 20
- LC Class: BP605.S2 L36 1986

Religion Inc. The Church of Scientology is a book about Scientology and L. Ron Hubbard, written by Stewart Lamont and published in 1986.

== Synopsis ==
The work includes twenty-seven photographs, taken by the author in the course of research for the book.

Lamont describes the difficulty authors often encounter in writing and publishing critical books on the Church of Scientology: "Books about Scientology have a greater permanency than newspaper articles and therefore it should not come as a surprise that vigorous smear-campaigns have been conducted against the authors of such investigations." Lamont later goes on to chronicle some of the harassment suffered by author Paulette Cooper after the publication of The Scandal of Scientology, including recounting parts of Operation Freakout. Lamont also goes into the inherent motivation for profit within the organization.

The book also details L. Ron Hubbard's actions later in life: his retreat to sea, isolated lifestyle in California, and death.

== Cited by other works ==
Religion Inc. is cited by other books and research reports on the subject matter, including: Journal of the American Academy of Religion, The State of the Discipline, Canadian Journal of Sociology, Marburg Journal of Religion, Shaking the World for Jesus, The Social Dimensions of Sectarianism, Alternative Religions: A Sociological Introduction, La Secte, and The Alms Trade.

== See also ==
- Bibliography of books critical of Scientology
- Scientology controversies
