= Russell Miller =

British journalist and author

- Born: c. 1938 (age 86–87); London, England
- Occupation(s): Journalist, Author
- Awards: Colour Magazine Writer of the Year, British Press Awards 1990; Four Press Awards, The Sunday Times Magazine; Writer of the Year, British Society of Magazine Editors

Russell Miller (born c. 1938) is a British journalist and author of fifteen books, including biographies of Hugh Hefner, J. Paul Getty and L. Ron Hubbard.

While under contract to The Sunday Times Magazine he won four press awards and was voted Writer of the Year by the Society of British Magazine Editors. His book Magnum: Fifty Years at the Front Line of History: The Story of the Legendary Photo Agency (1999) on Magnum Photos, was described by John Simpson as "the best book on photo-journalism I have ever read". His oral histories of D-Day, Nothing Less Than Victory (1993), and the SOE, Behind The Lines (2002) were widely acclaimed, both in Britain and in the United States.

== Life and work ==
Miller was born in east London and began his career in journalism at the age of sixteen.

In the early 1980s, Miller decided to write a biographical trilogy on the subjects of sex, money, and religion. The books that followed were Bunny (on Hugh Hefner, published in 1984), The House of Getty (on J. Paul Getty, 1985), and Bare-faced Messiah: The True Story of L. Ron Hubbard (on L. Ron Hubbard, 1987).

=== L. Ron Hubbard biography ===
In the 1980s Miller spent two years researching Bare-faced Messiah, a posthumous biography of the science-fiction author who had founded Scientology. The book challenges the official account of Hubbard's life and work promoted by the Church of Scientology and it was serialised in The Sunday Times.

External videos
- 2023 interview with Russell Miller covering his methods of investigating Hubbard for the book Bare-faced Messiah, the harassment and dirty tricks from the Church of Scientology and the lawsuits to stop publication of the book, and how different Scientology's hagiographic version of Hubbard is from what Miller found in the records.

While researching the book in the United States, Miller was spied upon. His friends and business associates also received visits from Scientologists and private detectives. Attempts were made to frame him for the murder of a London private detective, the murder of American singer Dean Reed in East Berlin and a fire in an aircraft factory. Senior executives at publishers Michael Joseph, and at The Sunday Times, which serialised the book, received threatening phone calls and also a visit from private investigator Eugene Ingram, who worked for the Church. Another private investigator, Jarl Grieve Einar Cynewulf, told The Sunday Times journalists that he had been offered "large sums of money" to find a link between Miller and the Central Intelligence Agency (CIA).

== Bibliography ==
- The Resistance (1979) ISBN 9780809425228
- The East Indiamen (1980) ISBN 978-0809426911
- The Commandos (1981) ISBN 9780809433995
- Continents in Collision (1983) ISBN 978-0809443246
- The Soviet Air Force (1983) ISBN 978-0809433711
- Bunny (1984), a biography of Hugh Hefner. ISBN 9780030637483
- The House of Getty (1985), a biography of J. Paul Getty. ASIN B005O7QC74
- Bare-faced Messiah (1987), a biography of L. Ron Hubbard. ISBN 978-1550130270
- Body and Soul: How to Succeed in Business and Change the World, with Anita Roddick (1992) ISBN 978-0712647199
- Nothing Less Than Victory: An Oral History of D-Day (1993) ISBN 978-0718133283
- Ten Days in May: The People's Story of VE Day (1995) ISBN 978-0718139292
- Magnum: Fifty Years at the Front Line of History: The Story of the Legendary Photo Agency (1999) ISBN 978-0802136534
- Behind The Lines: The Oral History of Special Operations in World War II (2002) ISBN 978-0436205347
- Codename Tricycle: The True Story of the Second World War's most extraordinary Double Agent (2004), a biography of Dušan Popov. ASIN B003U6YTYE
- The Adventures of Arthur Conan Doyle: A Biography (2008) ISBN 978-0312378974
- Uncle Bill: the Authorised Biography of Field Marshal Sir William Slim of Burma (2013) ISBN 978-0297865841
- Boom: The Life of Viscount Trenchard, Father of the Royal Air Force (2016) ISBN 9780297871057

== Awards ==
- Colour Magazine Writer of the Year, British Press Awards 1990
- Four Press Awards, The Sunday Times Magazine
- Writer of the Year, British Society of Magazine Editors

== Television appearances ==
In his capacity as Hubbard's biographer, Miller appeared in three British television documentaries:

- Facing South: The Cult Business broadcast on TVS (southern England regional TV), November 1987
- The Big Story: Inside the Cult made by Carlton TV and broadcast on ITV, 13 July 1995
- Scientology and Me broadcast on BBC One, 14 May 2007
