= Military career of L. Ron Hubbard =

Military career of the sci-fi author and scientologist

Lafayette Ronald Hubbard
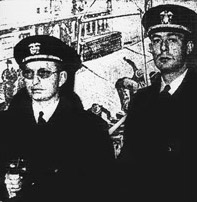
- Lts (jg) L. Ron Hubbard and Thomas S. Moulton in Portland, Oregon in 1943
- Born: March 13, 1911; Tilden, Nebraska US
- Died: January 24, 1986 (aged 74); San Luis Obispo County, California
- Military career
- Allegiance: United States of America
- Branch: United States Navy Reserve
- Service years: 1941–1945 active; Resigned reserve 1950
- Rank: Lieutenant
- Commands: USS YP-422; USS PC-815
- Conflicts: World War II
- Awards: Navy Pistol Marksmanship Ribbon; Navy Rifle Marksmanship Ribbon; American Defense Service Medal; Asiatic-Pacific Campaign Medal; American Campaign Medal; World War II Victory Medal
- Other work: Wrote Dianetics, Battlefield Earth, and founded Scientology

The military career of L. Ron Hubbard saw the future founder of Scientology serving in the United States Armed Forces as a member of the US Navy between 1941 and 1950, the Navy Reserve. He saw active service between 1941 and 1945, during World War II, as a naval lieutenant (junior grade) and later as a lieutenant. After the war he was mustered out of active service and resigned his commission in 1950.

As with many other aspects of L. Ron Hubbard's life, accounts of his military career are much disputed. His account of his military service later formed a major element of his public persona, as depicted by his Scientologist followers. The Church of Scientology presents Hubbard as a "much-decorated war hero who commanded a corvette and during hostilities was crippled and wounded". According to Scientology publications, he served as a "Commodore of Corvette squadrons" in "all five theaters of World War II" and was awarded "twenty-one medals and palms" for his service. He was "severely wounded and was taken crippled and blinded" to a military hospital, where he "worked his way back to fitness, strength and full perception in less than two years, using only what he knew and could determine about Man and his relationship to the universe."

However, his official Navy service records indicate that "his military performance was, at times, substandard", that he was only awarded a handful of campaign medals and that he was never injured or wounded in combat and was never awarded a Purple Heart. Most of his military service was spent ashore in the continental United States on administrative or training duties. He briefly commanded two small anti-submarine vessels, USS YP-422 and USS PC-815, in coastal waters off Massachusetts, Oregon and California in 1942 and 1943 respectively. He was removed from command of both vessels and rated by his superiors as being unsuitable for independent duties and "lacking in the essential qualities of judgment, leadership and cooperation". Although Hubbard asserted that he had attacked and crippled or sunk two Japanese submarines off Oregon while in command of USS PC-815, his claim was rejected by the commander of the Northwest Sea Frontier after a subsequent investigation. He was hospitalized for the last seven months of his active service, not with injuries but with an acute duodenal ulcer.

The Church of Scientology rejects the official record and insists that Hubbard had a second set of records that the U.S. Navy has concealed. According to the Church's chief spokesman, if it was true that Hubbard had not been injured, "the injuries that he handled by the use of Dianetics procedures were never handled, because they were injuries that never existed; therefore, Dianetics is based on a lie; therefore, Scientology is based on a lie."

== Montana Army National Guard and US Marine Corps Reserve ==
Hubbard's first military service was with the Montana Army National Guard, which he joined at the age of 16 in October 1927 while still at school, falsely stating that his age was 18. Enlisting at the State Armory in his home town of Helena, Montana, he served as a private in the Headquarters Company of 163rd Infantry. In May 1930, at the age of 19, he joined the Marine Corps Reserve 20th Regiment, a training unit connected with George Washington University, where he was a student from 1930 to 1932.

Hubbard attributed his service in the regiment to his need for "a little recreation. Life was dull. Fellow came up to me and he says, 'The Marine Reserves are organizing a twentieth regiment. Why don't you come down?'" He made the dubious claim of being rapidly promoted to the rank of First Sergeant; Hubbard later explained his unusually rapid promotion as being due to his unit being newly formed and his superiors being unable to "find anyone else who could drill". He stated that he was rated 'excellent' for military efficiency, obedience and sobriety. On October 22, 1931, Hubbard received an honorable discharge along with the annotation "not to be re-enlisted".

== World War II ==
=== Australia ===
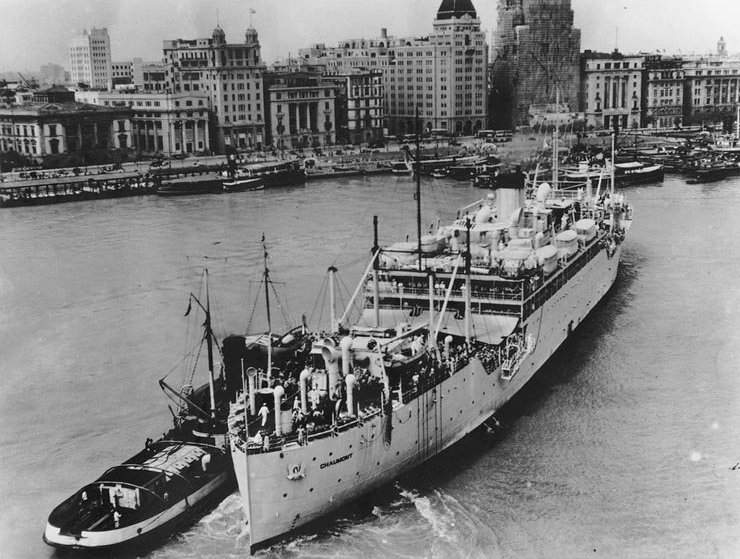
USS Chaumont, which transported L. Ron Hubbard back from Australia to the United States in 1942.

Hubbard joined the United States Navy during the summer of 1941, a few months before the United States entered the Second World War. He applied in March 1941 and was commissioned as a lieutenant, junior grade in the Naval Reserve on July 19, 1941. Hubbard was called to active duty in November. He specifically volunteered for "Special Service (intelligence duties)", an assignation recorded on his commission papers. He spent only a brief time in this nominal role with the Office of Naval Intelligence. After four months working in public relations and at the US Hydrographic Office, he spent three weeks at the Third Naval District in New York training for the role of intelligence officer.

Hubbard's training was curtailed by the Japanese attack on Pearl Harbor on December 7, 1941, and on December 18 he was sent to the Philippines via Australia. He was put ashore in Brisbane in January 1942 when his ship was re-routed. In 1963, Hubbard told Australian journalists that he had been "the only anti-aircraft battery in Australia in 1941–42... There was me and a Thompson submachine gun... I was a mail officer and I was replaced, I think, by a Captain, a couple of commanders and about 15 junior officers."

Another Church of Scientology account describes Hubbard as "Senior Officer Present Ashore in Brisbane, Australia" and asserts that "his duties included counter-intelligence and the organization of relief for beleaguered American forces on Bataan." Hubbard would claim that he had "sent on my own authority, four cargo ships loaded to the gunwales with machine gun ammunition, rifle ammunition and quinine up to MacArthur." Col. Merle-Smith, the US Naval Attaché to Australia, subsequently accused Hubbard of sending blockade-runner Don Isidro "three thousand miles out of her way". Hubbard was ordered back to the United States at the instigation of the Attaché, who cabled Washington to complain about Hubbard:

By assuming unauthorized authority and attempting to perform duties for which he has no qualifications, he became the source of much trouble... This officer is not satisfactory for independent duty assignment. He is garrulous and tries to give impressions of his importance. He also seems to think he has unusual ability in most lines. These characteristics indicate that he will require close supervision for satisfactory performance of any intelligence duty.

Hubbard would later recall: "for the next two or three years I'd run into officers, and they would say "Hubbard? Hubbard? Hubbard? Are you the Hubbard that was in Australia?" And I'd say "Yes." And they's say "Oh!" Kind of, you know, horrified, like they didn't know whether they should quite talk to me or not, you know? Terrible man".

Hubbard stated on another occasion that he had been "one of the first officers back from the upper battle areas" and when "Melbourne found out ... there were enough troops in the area so the danger was over, so I went home. I wrote myself some orders and reported back to the US." According to the Church of Scientology, Hubbard was landed on the island of Java "in the closing days of February 1942" to search for "stockpiled weapons and fast, shallow-draft vessels". He was cut off by invading Japanese "and was only able to escape the island after scrambling into a rubber raft and paddling out to meet an Australian destroyer". Another officer's testimony in the later Armstrong cases, based on what Hubbard had told him, was that after Hubbard was wounded in the back by machine gun fire, he and another man sailed a life raft over 700 miles from Java to 75 miles off the coast of West Australia where they were picked up by a British or Australian destroyer. US Navy records do not show Hubbard spent any time on Java, and do not show any evidence of wounds or injuries sustained in combat.

Naval documents presented in court show that Hubbard left the USA on December 8, 1941, arriving in Brisbane via USS President Polk, and was ordered back to the USA in February 1942 via the USS Chaumont. However, the Church of Scientology asserts Hubbard landed in Java in late February 1942 and the raft story followed when Hubbard had "missed the last departing allied aircraft on March 6th".

In a 1956 lecture to Scientologists, Hubbard said:

I was flown in from the South Pacific as the first casualty to be shipped out of the South Pacific war back to the States. The war had been started in Pearl Harbor, and I'd been down in the South Pacific and – a lot of things happened down there. And the outfits down there were pretty well wiped out, as you can remember before the US and Great Britain started to fight and go back in. All right. Most of the guys that were shipped out of there who had been wounded, were shipped out by slow boat. And I didn't, I wasn't that seriously done in. I hooked a ride on the Secretary of the Navy's plane; produced the right set of orders (I hope nobody ever kept them on file) and got flown home.

In another lecture of the same year, Hubbard provided an alternative version of his return to the United States:

I picked up a telephone, called the Secretary of [the] Navy. See, and I said, "I'm tired of this place. I'd like to leave." And he said, "Yeah." I said, "Yeah, I've got some important despatches. As a matter of fact, we've got enough despatches here to practically sink the Japanese navy if they had to carry them. There's a lot of traffic and stuff like that, and so forth." So he sent his plane down and picked me up and flew me home.

=== Atlantic service: USS YP-422 and after ===
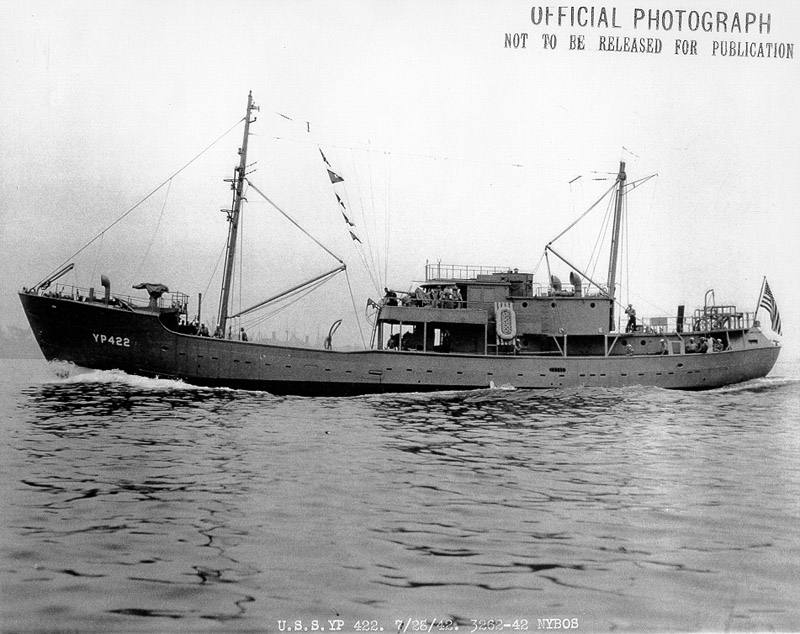
The yard patrol craft USS YP-422, L. Ron Hubbard's first command, a few days before its official commissioning

Hubbard was posted to the Office of the Cable Censor in New York City after returning to the US at the end of March 1942. As the office had recently ceased to be an organ of Naval Intelligence, his status was amended to deck officer. He was also promoted (as part of a batch of other officers of the same grade) on June 15, 1942, to lieutenant, senior grade, the highest rank he was to hold during his active service.

In June 1942 he requested that he be assigned to sea duty in the Caribbean; he was sent instead to the shipyard of George Lawley & Son of Neponset, Massachusetts, where the fishing trawler MV Mist was being converted for military use as a naval yard patrol (YP) vessel. The navy commandeered numerous fishing vessels and redesignated them as YP boats, tasked with defending coastal waters against enemy submarines and delivering food and equipment to military personnel offshore; they were particularly prized for having refrigeration units. The vessel was commissioned as USS YP-422 on July 28, 1942, having been refitted as a freighter armed with a 3-inch deck gun and two .30-caliber machine guns. In August, YP-422 put to sea from the Boston Navy Yard to carry out a 27-hour training exercise. In 1954, Hubbard claimed that the crew had been prisoners who had been released to serve about the vessel. "This crew almost starved an officer to death one day... we were going out to test a new weapon... they'd bedded him down in a chain locker! They said that was the only available stateroom — Wet and miserable place."

However, Hubbard fell out with a senior officer at the shipyard and sent a critical memorandum to the Vice-Chief of Naval Operations (VCNO) in Washington, D.C. The Commandant of the Navy Yard responded on September 25, 1942, by informing the VCNO that, in his view, Hubbard was "not temperamentally fitted for independent command" and requesting that Hubbard be removed and ordered to "other duty under immediate supervision of a more senior officer". Hubbard duly lost his command on October 1, 1942, and was ordered to New York, ending his service in the Atlantic.

Various accounts of Hubbard's service in the North Atlantic have been put forward by the Church of Scientology and Hubbard himself. The Church of Scientology states in one publication that Hubbard "took command of an antisubmarine escort vessel with Atlantic convoys". In a 1954 lecture, Hubbard asserted that he had been sent "to Boston in the very early part of the war to take command of a corvette" and had been given a crew made up of convicts from the Portsmouth Naval Prison. Hubbard stated in another lecture that he had been posted aboard "corvettes, North Atlantic. And I went on fighting submarines in the North Atlantic and doing other things and so on. And I finally got a set of orders for the ship. By that time I had the squadron."

Biographical accounts published by the Church of Scientology have described Hubbard as commanding the "Fourth British Corvette Squadron" and Hubbard himself stated that he "was running British corvettes during the war". A biographical interview with Hubbard published in 1956 speaks of him commanding "the former British corvette, the Mist". (The only British naval vessel named Mist was an Admiralty drifter, one of a number of small wooden vessels constructed for the Royal Navy in 1918.) Hubbard also asserted that he had sustained wounds "aboard a corvette in the North Atlantic". A biographical profile published in 2008 by the Scientology-related imprint Galaxy Press asserts that Hubbard "served with distinction in four theaters and was highly decorated for commanding corvettes in the North Pacific. He was also grievously wounded in combat [and] lost many a close friend and colleague ..."

In November 1942, Hubbard was sent to the Submarine Chaser Training Center in Miami, Florida, for training on submarine chaser vessels. He subsequently undertook a 10-day anti-submarine warfare training course at the Fleet Sound School in Key West and on January 17, 1943, he was posted to the Albina Engine & Machine Works in Portland, Oregon, where he was to take command of the subchaser USS PC-815 when she was commissioned.

=== Pacific service: USS PC-815 ===
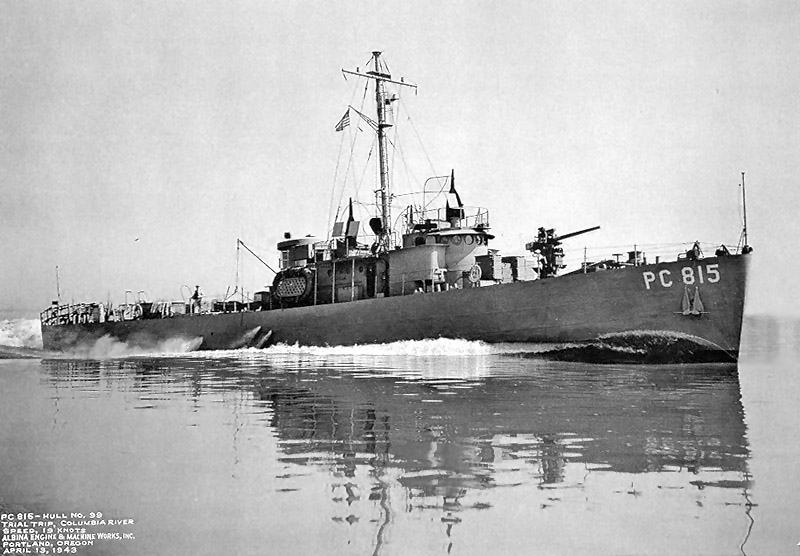
The newly completed subchaser USS PC-815 running trials on the Columbia River on April 13, 1943.

When Hubbard arrived in Portland, USS PC-815 was in the last stages of its construction. The ship, a 173 ft (53 m) steel-hulled subchaser of the PC-461 class, had been laid down on October 10, 1942, at the Albina shipworks. She was commissioned on April 21, 1943, with Hubbard in command and Lt (jg) Thomas Moulton, an officer with whom he had studied in Florida, as the ship's executive officer. The ship left Portland on May 18 to travel down the Columbia River to Astoria, Oregon, where she took on ammunition. After participating for a day in an air-sea rescue operation, USS PC-815 was ordered to sail to San Diego to commence its shakedown cruise.

In the early hours of May 19, PC-815's sonar detected what the crew believed to be an enemy submarine off Cape Lookout, about 10 to 12 miles offshore. Over the next two and a half days, Hubbard ordered his crew to fire a total of 35 depth charges and a number of gun rounds to target what Hubbard believed to be two Imperial Japanese Navy submarines. PC-815 was joined by the US Navy blimps K-39 and K-33, the US Coast Guard patrol boats Bonham and 78302, and the subchasers USS SC-536 and USS SC-537, to assist it in the search for the suspected enemy vessels. Hubbard was given temporary command of the vessels on the afternoon of May 19. The larger subchaser PC-778 also joined the submarine search, though it found no indication of submarines and its commander was subsequently castigated by Hubbard for his refusal to lay its own larger stock of depth charges or resupply the PC-815.

Hubbard stated in his 18-page after-action report that he had intended to force the submarine to surface so that it could be attacked by the surface vessels' guns. He reported that his vessel had seen oil on the surface, though PC-815 took no samples, and asserted that the blimps had seen air bubbles, oil and a periscope, though the blimps' own reports did not corroborate this. No wreckage was seen, despite the heavy depth-charging. PC-815 sustained some minor damage and three crew were injured during the incident when the ship's radio antenna was accidentally hit by gunfire. At midnight on 21 May, with depth charges exhausted and the presence of a submarine still unconfirmed by any other ship, PC-815 was ordered back to Astoria.

The incident attracted the attention of the naval high command, as there had been a verified Japanese submarine attack against Fort Stevens about 50 miles (80 km) further north in June 1942 and there had been an invasion scare in southern California earlier in 1942. Hubbard claimed to have "definitely sunk, beyond doubt" one submarine and critically damaged another. His view was not shared by his superiors. After reviewing the action reports and interviewing Hubbard and the other commanders present, Admiral Frank Jack Fletcher noted: "An analysis of all reports convinces me that there was no submarine in the area. Lieutenant Commander Sullivan states that he was unable to obtain any evidence of a submarine except one bubble of air which is unexplained except by turbulence of water due to a depth charge explosion. The commanding officers of all ships except the PC-815 state they had no evidence of a submarine and do not think a submarine was in the area." Fletcher also noted that there was a "known magnetic deposit in the area in which depth charges were dropped". The clear implication was that Hubbard had been targeting the deposit all along.

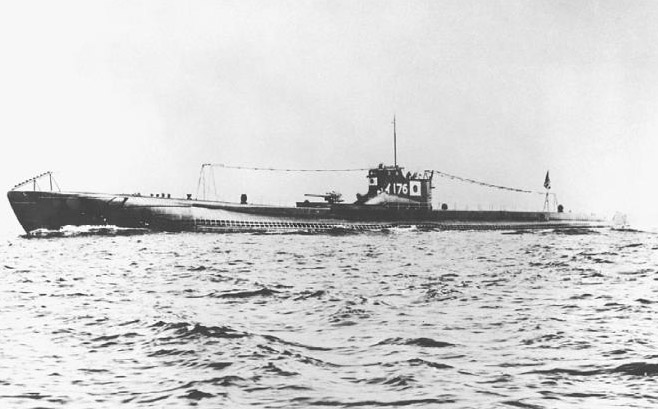
The Japanese submarine I-76 (renamed I-176 in 1942), which L. Ron Hubbard said he had destroyed off the Oregon coast in 1943.

Hubbard nonetheless continued to claim that he had sunk at least one Japanese submarine. Years later, in 1956, he told Scientologists:

I dropped the I-76 or the Imperial Japanese Navy Trans-Pacific Submarine down into the mouth of the Columbia River, dead duck. And it went down with a resounding furor. And that was that.

In another lecture, he commented:

I know one officer that was reprimanded for taking on a submarine three times the size of his ship and sinking it – a Japanese submarine. And he was called in and reprimanded. That doesn't sound possible, does it?

After the war, the British Admiralty and US Navy analysed the captured records of the Japanese navy to account for all of its vessels. Their reports do not list any Japanese submarine losses off the coast of the contiguous United States during the whole of the war. According to military records, I-76 was destroyed off Buka Island in the western Pacific by the destroyers USS Franks, USS Haggard and USS Johnston on May 16, 1944. Hubbard's crew however, who were very loyal to him, shared his conviction that they had engaged an enemy submarine. His second-in-command, Thomas Moulton, later asserted that the Navy had hushed up the incident, fearing that the presence of Japanese submarines so close to the Pacific coast might cause panic.

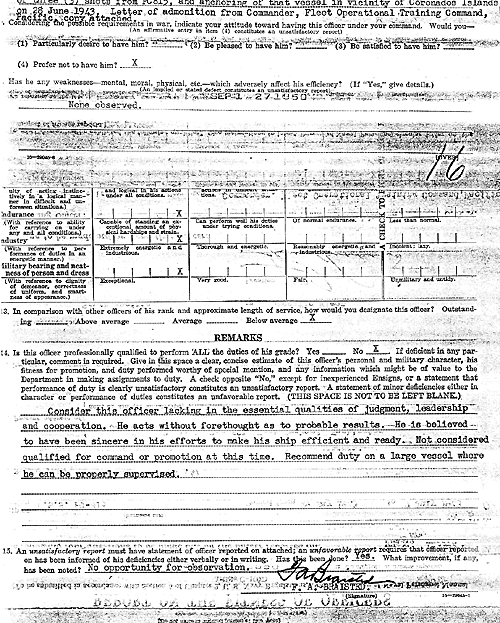
A page from the official US Navy report and evaluation of Hubbard's fitness for command, following the Coronado Islands incident

Following its return to Astoria, USS PC-815 was ordered to escort a new aircraft carrier to San Diego, where the subchaser was to participate in exercises. On June 28, 1943, Hubbard ordered his crew to fire four shells from the ship's 3-inch gun and a number of rifle and pistol shots in the direction of the Coronado Islands, off which the ship anchored for the night. He did not realize that the islands belonged to Mexico, an ally, nor that he had taken USS PC-815 into Mexican territorial waters. The islands were garrisoned by a small detachment of Mexican Navy personnel during the war.

The Mexican government complained and two days later, Hubbard found himself before a naval Board of Investigation in San Diego. He was found to have disregarded orders by carrying out an unsanctioned gunnery practice and violating Mexican waters. He was reprimanded and removed from command, effective July 7. Rear Admiral Frank A. Braisted commented, in a fitness report written shortly after the Coronado incident, that he "consider[ed] this officer lacking in the essential qualities of judgment, leadership and cooperation. He acts without forethought as to probable results. He is believed to have been sincere in his efforts to make his ship efficient and ready. Not considered qualified for command or promotion at this time. Recommend duty on a large vessel where he can be properly supervised."

=== USS Algol and shore service ===
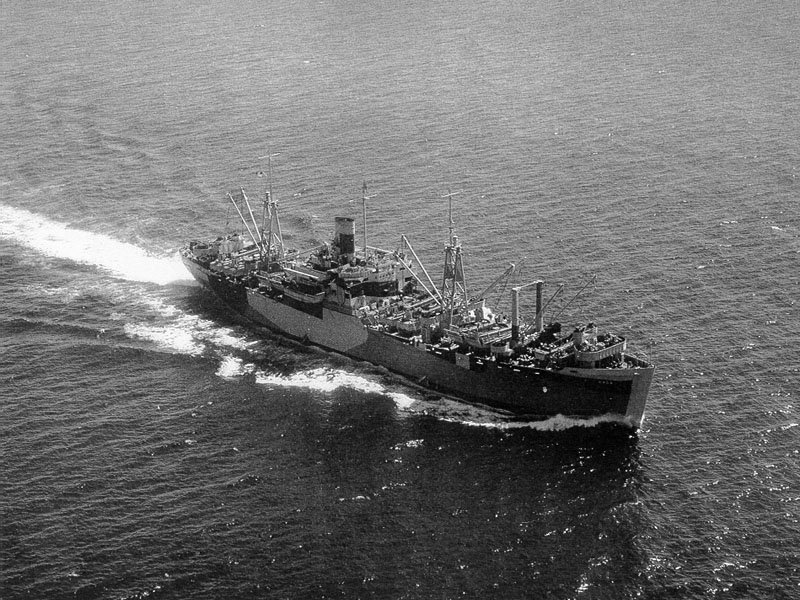
The amphibious cargo ship USS Algol at sea, circa 1944. L. Ron Hubbard served aboard from December 1943 to September 1944.

On the same day that Hubbard was sent a formal letter of admonition, he reported sick with complaints of epigastric pains and possible malaria. In his Affirmations, Hubbard later recorded: "Your stomach trouble you used as an excuse to keep the Navy from punishing you."

After 77 days on the sick list, it was finally determined that he was suffering from a duodenal ulcer. In October 1943, he asked to be transferred to landing craft and was sent on a six-week training course at the Naval Small Craft Training Center in San Pedro, California. He was then ordered in December 1943 to join the crew of USS Algol, an attack cargo ship, to assist with the ship's fitting out and crew training in Portland, Oregon. The vessel was commissioned in July 1944 with Hubbard aboard in the role of Navigation and Training Officer. The next two months were occupied with training exercises off the California coast, but when the ship departed Oakland on October 4 for the western Pacific theater of operations, Hubbard was no longer aboard.

Hubbard, however, applied instead to undertake a three-month training course in military administration at the School of Military Government, a faculty that had been established on the campus of Princeton University, but was not part of the University itself, although Hubbard later asserted that he had been a Princeton student. His commanding officer approved the detachment and gave Hubbard a generally good fitness report, rating him to be "of excellent personal and military character" though he "is very temperamental and often has his feelings hurt". On September 27, a curious incident occurred aboard USS Algol; the ship's deck log records that Hubbard reported that he had discovered "an attempt at sabotage" consisting of a Coke bottle filled with gasoline with a cloth wick inserted, concealed among the ship's cargo. A few hours later Hubbard was ordered to depart the ship and proceed to Princeton.

In later years, Hubbard asserted that the 1955 film Mister Roberts was based on his service aboard USS Algol with Henry Fonda's eponymous character being based on Hubbard himself and James Cagney's tyrannical character based on the commander of Algol. In a February 1956 lecture, Hubbard told Scientologists: "There was a story made about that vessel [Algol], by the way. It was called Mister Roberts. You may have seen this picture or read the book." According to a Church of Scientology publication,

At the end of the war, having been relegated because of his physical condition to the amphibious forces in the Pacific, he had the adventures which are reported on the screen in "Mister Roberts". "The Bucket" of that motion picture, stage play, and the novel is actually the A.K.A. 54, the U.S.S. Algol. The captain so brutally characterized in the picture is actually Lieutenant Commander Axton P. [sic] Jones. L. Ron Hubbard as "Mister Roberts" was with the ship less than a year, however, and contrary to the script, was not killed at Okinawa.

George Malko comments that "this [claim] has never been substantiated" and notes that the author of the original novel, Thomas Heggen, "would only say about Roberts: "He is too good to be true, he is a pure invention."" The novel was reportedly "loosely based on [Heggen's] service on the USS Virgo".

At the conclusion of his course at the School of Military Government, Hubbard failed to pass his examinations – finishing only mid-way down the class list – and did not qualify for an overseas posting. He was posted in January 1945 to the Naval Civil Affairs Staging Area in Monterey, California, for further training but, as he later acknowledged, he became depressed and fell ill with a duodenal ulcer. He reported sick with stomach pains in April 1945 and spent the remainder of the war on the sick list as a patient in Oak Knoll Naval Hospital in Oakland, California. A Church of Scientology account asserts that "eventual combat wounds would finally preclude him from serving with American occupation forces".

In October 1945, a Naval Board found that he was "considered physically qualified to perform duty ashore, preferably within the continental United States", in reflection of his chronic ulcer. He was discharged from the hospital and mustered out of active service on December 6, 1945. He resigned his commission in October 1950. According to the Church of Scientology, he quit because the US Navy had "attempted to monopolize all his researches and force him to work on a project "to make man more suggestible" and when he was unwilling, tried to blackmail him by ordering him back to active duty to perform this function. Having many friends he was able to instantly resign from the Navy and escape this trap." Hubbard himself told Scientologists:

[T]he Office of Naval Intelligence right here in Washington, DC, threatened to call me to active duty to use what I knew about the mind. ... [T]his officer from the Office of Naval Research came to see me right here in Washington and he wanted me to go on as a civilian employee in order to use what I knew of the mind to make men more suggestible. And I smiled a feline smile. And I said, "No." And he smiled like something out of Faust, and he said to me, "Well, all you have to do is say 'No' and I will call you back to active duty because you still are an officer of the United States Navy." And with that purr he exited. ... So I went down here to the Washington Navy Yard, the Potomac River Naval Command, and I got my resignation accepted.

According to the US Navy, "There is no evidence on record of an attempt to recall him to active duty."

== Alleged war wounds ==
As the psychologist and computer scientist Christopher Evans has noted, "One aspect of [Hubbard's] war record that is particularly confused, and again typical of the mixture of glamour and obscurantism which surrounds Hubbard and his past, is the matter of wounds or injuries suffered on active service." Hubbard asserted after the war that he had been "blinded with injured optic nerves, and lame with physical injuries to hip and back... Yet I worked my way back to fitness and strength in less than two years, using only what I knew about Man and his relationship to the universe." Accounts published by the Church of Scientology asserted that he had been "flown home in the late spring of 1942 in the secretary of the Navy's private plane as the first U.S.-returned casualty from the Far East". The Church of Scientology goes further, describing him as "the first American casualty of South Pacific combat".

Thomas Moulton, Hubbard's executive officer on USS PC-815, testified in 1984 that Hubbard had said that he had been shot in the Dutch East Indies, and that on another occasion Hubbard had told him that his eyes had been damaged by the flash of a large-caliber gun. Hubbard himself told Scientologists in a taped lecture that he had suffered eye injuries after having had "a bomb go off in my face." He told Robert Heinlein, the science fiction writer, that "both of his feet had been broken ... when his last ship was bombed". (Note: Robert A. Heinlein referred to the foot injury as a "drumhead-type injury", however a drumhead injury is a common wartime injury to the eardrum, not feet.) According to Heinlein, Hubbard said that he "had had a busy war – sunk four times and wounded again and again". Hubbard was said to have "twice been pronounced dead" and to have spent a year in a naval hospital which he "utilized in the study of endocrine substances and protein". The techniques that he developed "made possible not only his own recovery from injury, but helped other servicemen to regain their health". On another occasion, Hubbard said that he had been hospitalized because "I was utterly exhausted. I'd just been in combat theater after combat theater, you see, with no rest, no nothing between."

This account was challenged by a series of writers and journalists from the mid-1970s onwards. Writing in 1974, Evans noted that the Veterans Administration had confirmed that (even at that late stage in his life) Hubbard "receives $160 a month in compensation for disabilities incurred during the Second World War. However the conditions listed as being '40% disabling' are: duodenal ulcer, bursitis (right shoulder), arthritis, and blepharoconjunctivitis." Evans noted: "a Navy Department spokesman has stated that 'an examination of Mr Hubbard's record does not reveal any evidence of injuries suffered while in the service of the United States Navy'."

Sixteen years later, the Los Angeles Times obtained Hubbard's medical records through the Freedom of Information Act. The records stated that Hubbard had told doctors that he had been "lamed" by a chronic hip infection, and that his eye problems were the result of conjunctivitis caused by exposure to "excessive tropical sunlight". Hubbard's post-war correspondence with the VA was also included, including letters in which he requested psychiatric treatment to address his "long periods of moroseness" and "suicidal inclinations". He continued to complain to the VA about various physical ailments into the 1950s, well after he had founded Dianetics. The Times noted that Hubbard had promised that Dianetics would provide "a cure for the very ailments that plagued the author himself then and throughout his life, including allergies, arthritis, ulcers and heart problems". Other documents on Hubbard's medical file stated that he had injured his back in 1942 after falling off a ship's ladder.

== Claimed medals ==
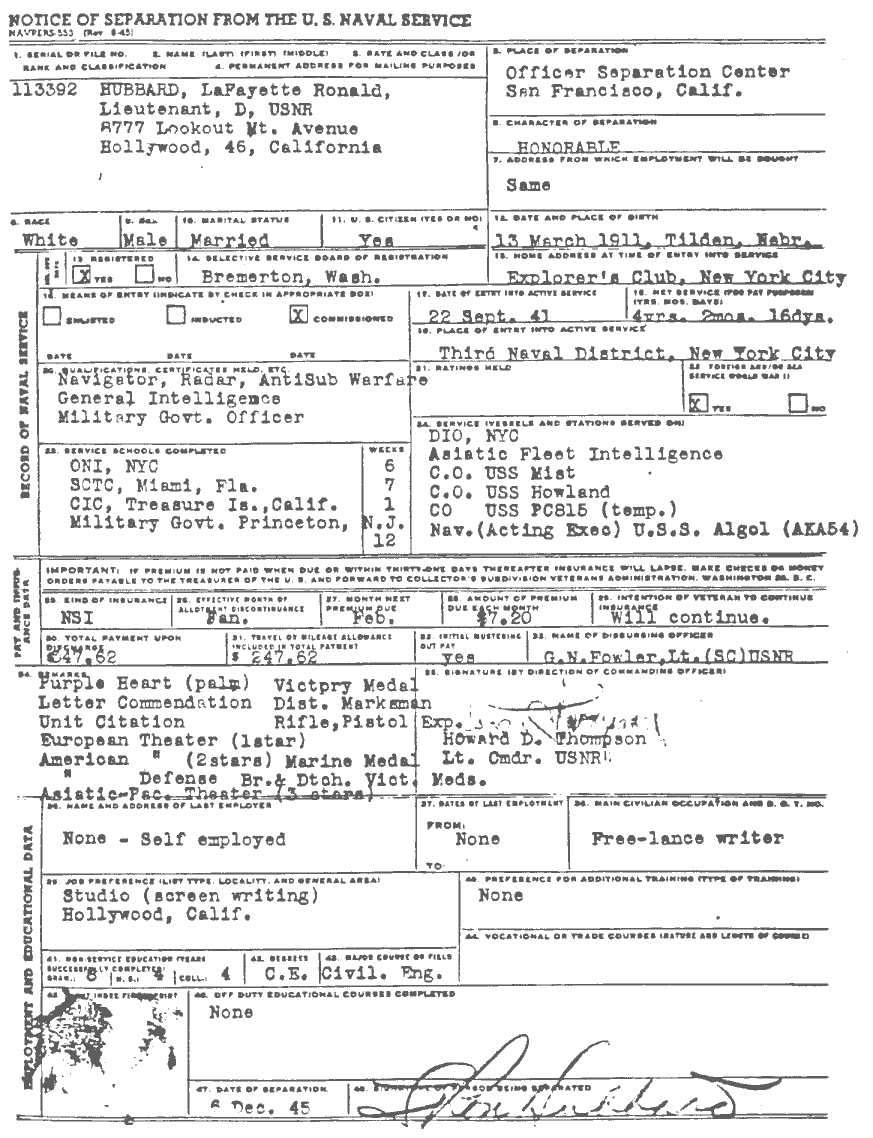
Unofficial US Navy record of service distributed by the Church of Scientology.

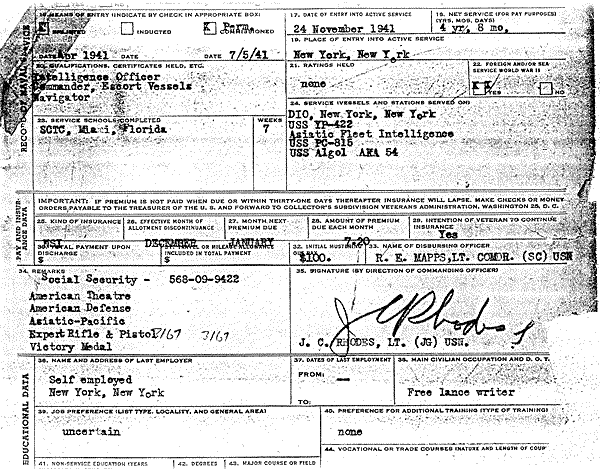
L. Ron Hubbard's official Notice of Separation from the U.S. Naval Service, released by the US Navy in response to Freedom of Information Act requests.

Hubbard's war medals have also been an issue of contention. Although the Church of Scientology has stated that Hubbard was "highly decorated for duties under fire", the actual number of decorations said to have been awarded to Hubbard has varied considerably over the years. In a 1968 interview with British journalists, Hubbard showed his visitors sixteen war medals that he claimed to have been awarded. A few months later, the Church of Scientology published a "Data Sheet on Lafayette Ron Hubbard" that stated that he had been awarded "Twenty-one medals and palms". (The "Data Sheet" lists Hubbard as the Commanding Officer (CO) of the USS Holland.)

In May 1974, the Church asked the Navy Department to supply seventeen medals that he was said to have been awarded, including the Purple Heart and Navy Commendation Medal, many of them with bronze service stars denoting participation in military campaigns or multiple bestowals of the same award. The Navy sent only four medals, noting, "The records in this Bureau fail to establish Mr. Hubbard's entitlement to the other medals and awards listed in your response." Hubbard responded by circulating to Scientologists a photograph of 21 medals and palms that he said he had been awarded and explained that he had actually won 28, but that the missing seven had been awarded to him in secret because the naval high command was embarrassed that he had sunk two Japanese submarines in the United States' "back yard". A 1994 biography published by the Church of Scientology states that he was awarded 29 medals and awards.

In 1990 the Church of Scientology released a document, said to be a copy of Hubbard's official record of service, to support its assertion that Hubbard had been awarded 21 medals and decorations. The Church asserts that Hubbard was awarded a "Unit Citation which is only awarded by the President to combat units that perform particularly meritorious service." Among the other awards listed on the record released by the Church is the British Victory Medal, an award issued for service in the British armed forces in the First World War and that was never awarded by itself. The Church's document also credits Hubbard with a Purple Heart with a Palm, implying two wounds received in action. However, the U.S. Navy uses gold and silver stars, not a palm, to indicate multiple wounds. The Church has distributed a photograph of medals said to have been won by Hubbard; two of the medals (specifically the National Defense Service Medal and the Armed Forces Reserve Medal) were not even created until after Hubbard left active service.

The Church's record lists Hubbard as commanding the "USS Mist". Although USS YP-422 was originally named Mist when it was in civilian service, it was never called USS Mist; the only 20th-century US Navy vessel of that name listed in the Dictionary of American Naval Fighting Ships left naval service in 1919, when Hubbard was six years old. It is signed by "Howard D. Thompson, Lt. Cmdr.", who is not listed in the records of commissioned naval officers at that time. Archivist Eric Voelz of the National Personnel Records Center told The New Yorker that the document is a forgery.

The Los Angeles Times commented, and NPR later confirmed, that the Notice of Separation From Naval Service "indicates Hubbard received four medals during his Navy career, as well as two marksmanship medals" and noted "discrepancies" with the Scientology version. The four medals that the US Navy's record credits to Hubbard were the American Defense Service Medal, which was awarded to all members of the military in service at the time of the December 1941 attack on Pearl Harbor; the American Campaign Medal, awarded to all service members who had performed duty in the American Theater of Operations during the war; the Asiatic-Pacific Campaign Medal, awarded to all who had served in the Pacific Theater; and the World War II Victory Medal, awarded to all who served during World War II. According to the Department of the Navy, there was "no record of the additional decorations the church says Hubbard received".

Church officials have argued the Navy's records were "not only grossly incomplete but perhaps were falsified to conceal Hubbard's secret activities as an intelligence officer". In the 1980s the Church turned to L. Fletcher Prouty, a former U.S. Army colonel, who said that Hubbard's records had been falsified to cover up his "intelligence background". Prouty, who died in 2001, was a prominent conspiracy theorist best known for advocating John F. Kennedy assassination conspiracy theories and was also associated with the anti-semitic Liberty Lobby group and the Lyndon LaRouche organization.

== Documenting Hubbard's military career ==
Hubbard's military career has attracted comment from a number of journalists and writers over the years. The claims made by the Church of Scientology were not challenged by some early writers; C.H. Rolph quoted without comment a 1968 Scientology biographical sketch circulated to British Members of Parliament in which Hubbard's war service was summarized, and in 1971 Paulette Cooper described as "true" the claim that Hubbard "was severely injured in the war (and in fact was in a lifeboat for many days, badly injuring his body and his eyes in the hot Pacific sun)". Others were more skeptical. George Malko attempted to verify Hubbard's "revealing, anonymously authored, and totally unsubstantiated biography" in 1970 but reported that "I was unable to confirm a single one of [Hubbard's] critical claims: that he had been crippled and blind, the nature of his 'discoveries,' and the medical records stating he had 'twice been pronounced dead.'" His inquiries were frustrated by the Navy's refusal to provide Hubbard's service record "without the written consent of the person whose records are concerned".

Information later released by the Navy and the Veterans Administration prompted some to express doubts. Christopher Evans commented in 1974 that "faced with this impressive, if annoyingly undetailed, record it is hard to assess the nature or extent of Hubbard's battle scars in the service of his country" but noted contradictions between claims of war wounds and the official record. In 1978, the Los Angeles Times described Hubbard's war record as "obscure" and quoted Navy spokesmen stating that Hubbard had not received a Purple Heart and had not been treated for any injuries sustained during his military career, contrary to the statements of the Church of Scientology.

By 1979, an amateur researcher, Michael Shannon, had gathered "a mountain of material which included some files that no one else had bothered to get copies of – for example, the log books of the Navy ships that Hubbard had served on, and his father's Navy service file". Although Shannon was unable to find a publisher, he sent a hundred-page portfolio of materials, including copies of some of Hubbard's naval and college records, to a number of "concerned individuals". His work also found its way to the Church of Scientology's archivist, Gerry Armstrong, who was undertaking a project to research an official authorized biography of L. Ron Hubbard. According to Jon Atack, "the archive largely confirmed Shannon's material. Armstrong and Shannon reached the same eventual destination from opposed starting points." In October 1980, Omar Garrison, a writer who had previously written two books favorable to Scientology, was hired by the Church to write Hubbard's biography based on the materials that Armstrong had collected.

Armstrong became disillusioned and left Scientology at the start of 1982. He was declared a "Suppressive Person" (an enemy of Scientology) by the Church. With Garrison's permission, Armstrong made copies of around 100,000 pages from the Hubbard archive and deposited them with attorneys for safe keeping. The Church responded by suing Armstrong for breach of confidence, theft and invasion of privacy. The suit went to trial in a California court in 1984 as Church of Scientology of California vs. Gerald Armstrong. Hubbard's military career was a major focus of the case. Armstrong stated that he had "amassed approximately two thousand pages of documentation concerning Hubbard's wartime career: what he was doing what vessels he was on, fitness reports and medical and VA disability records. The truth is far different from the public representations." Garrison, who had by that time agreed to a settlement with the Church under which his manuscript would never be made public, told the court:

The inconsistencies were implicit in various documents which Mr. Armstrong provided me with respect to Mr. Hubbard's curriculum vitae, with respect to his Navy career, with respect to almost every aspect of his life. These undeniable and documented facts did not coincide with the official published biography that the church had promulgated.

During the trial's four weeks of testimony, the court heard evidence from Thomas S. Moulton, Hubbard's second-in-command aboard the USS PC-815. Moulton testified that Hubbard had told him that he had been involved in the Pearl Harbor attack in 1941 and that he had been the only survivor of his destroyer, which had gone down with all hands save himself. The "submarine battle" of May 1943 was also described by Moulton and was hailed by a Church of Scientology attorney as "a new untold chapter to the history of the Pacific conflict during World War II; and new perspectives on the magnitude – and proximity – of Japanese naval operations off the U.S. coast during the war". Moulton also testified that Hubbard had told him that he had received combat injuries to his eyes and back. In response, documents contradicting Moulton's (and Hubbard's) account were read into the record by Armstrong's attorney, Michael Flynn.

The decision, by Judge Paul Breckenridge, found that Armstrong's fears of persecution by the Church were reasonable, and thus his conduct in turning over the documents in his possession to his attorneys was also reasonable. The judge issued a wide-ranging verdict, commenting of Hubbard that "the evidence portrays a man who has been virtually a pathological liar when it comes to his history, background and achievements." A few weeks later, a British judge ruled in a case heard at the Royal Courts of Justice that Hubbard had made a number of "false claims" about his military career: "That he was a much decorated war hero. He was not. That he commanded a corvette squadron. He did not. That he was awarded the Purple Heart, a gallantry decoration for those wounded in action. He was not wounded and was not decorated. That he was crippled and blinded in the war and cured himself with Dianetics techniques. He was not crippled and was not blinded." The judge, Mr. Justice Latey, noted: "There is no dispute about any of this. The evidence is unchallenged."

Hubbard's military service has subsequently been covered in detail by the British writers Russell Miller (Bare-faced Messiah, 1987) and Jon Atack (A Piece of Blue Sky, 1990), by the Los Angeles Times in a six-part special report on Scientology published in June 1990, and by Lawrence Wright in The New Yorker in February 2011 and his book Going Clear: Scientology, Hollywood, and the Prison of Belief (2013). The accuracy of Miller's account has been questioned; Marco Frenschkowski, writing in 1999, commented that Miller's book had "definitely exposed some inflated statements about Hubbard's early achievements" but had also been partly disproved by the Church of Scientology, though he did not state which elements had been disproved.

== Sources ==
- Atack, Jon (1990). A Piece of Blue Sky: Scientology, Dianetics and L. Ron Hubbard Exposed. Lyle Stuart Books. ISBN 081840499X. OL 9429654M.
- Cooper, Paulette (1971). The Scandal of Scientology. Tower Publications. OCLC 921001. OL 39467941M.
- Corydon, Bent (1987). L. Ron Hubbard, Messiah or Madman?. Lyle Stuart. ISBN 0818404442.
- Evans, Christopher (1974). Cults of Unreason. Farrar, Straus and Giroux. ISBN 0374133247. OL 5438675M.
- Lamont, Stewart (1986). Religion Inc. : The Church of Scientology. Harrap. ISBN 0245543341. OL 2080316M.
- Miller, Russell (1987). Bare-faced Messiah : The True Story of L. Ron Hubbard. Henry Holt and Company. ISBN 0805006540. OL 26305813M.
- Rolph, C. H. (1973). Believe What You Like : What happened between the Scientologists and the National Association for Mental Health. André Deutsch. ISBN 0233963758. OL 5082014M.
- Streeter, Michael (2008). Behind Closed Doors: The Power and Influence of Secret Societies. London: New Holland Publishers. ISBN 978-1-84537-937-7. OL 25446794M.
- Wright, Lawrence (2013). Going Clear: Scientology, Hollywood and the Prison of Belief. Alfred A. Knopf. ISBN 9780307700667. OL 25424776M.
