= Albert Abrams =

American doctor

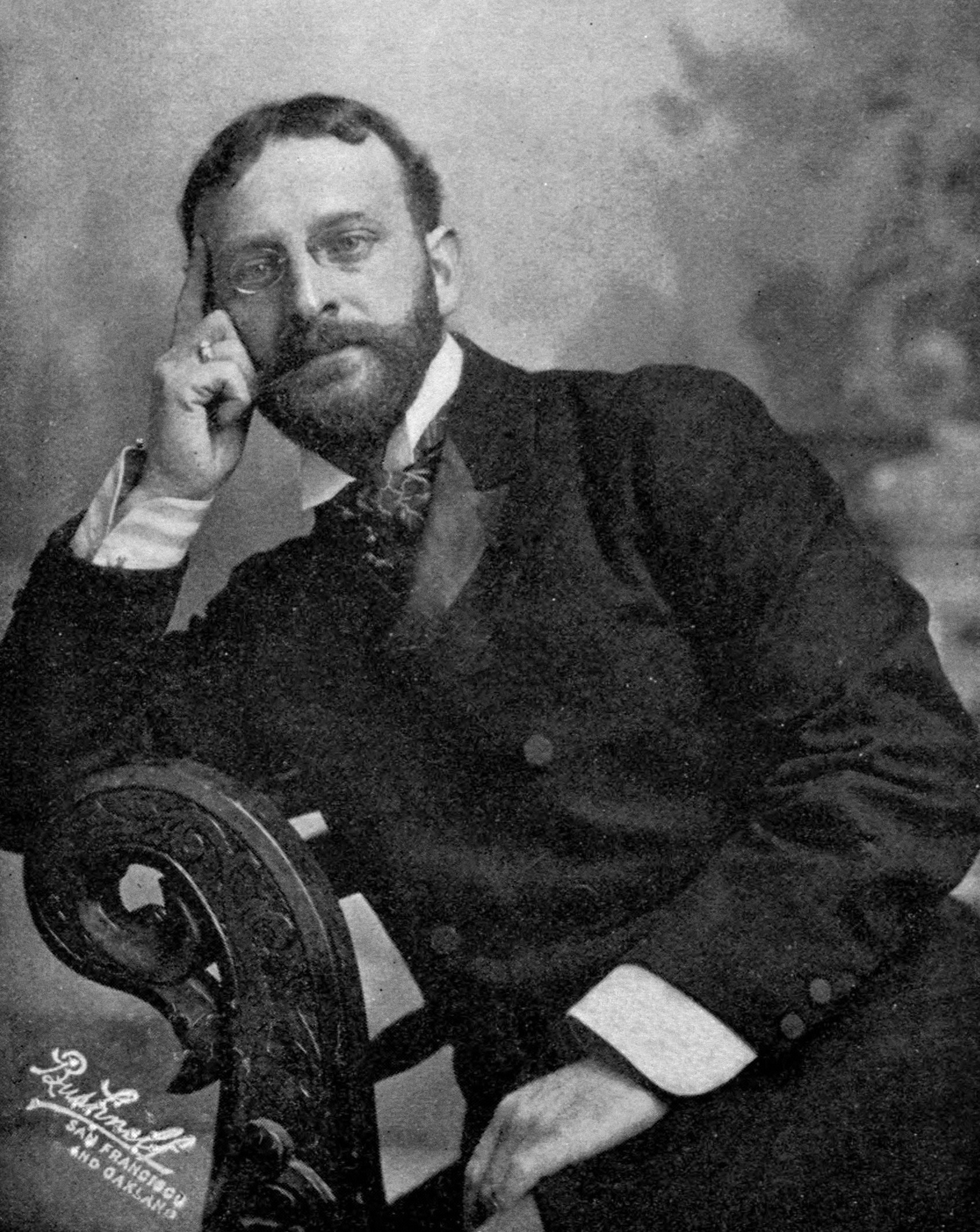
- Born: December 8, 1863; San Francisco, California, U.S.
- Died: January 13, 1924 (aged 60); San Francisco, California, U.S.
- Education: Medical College of the Pacific
- Occupation: Physician
- Known for: Claiming to be able to cure almost any disease

Albert Abrams (December 8, 1863 – January 13, 1924) was a fraudulent American physician, well known during his life for inventing machines, such as the "Oscilloclast" and the "Radioclast", which he falsely claimed could diagnose and cure almost any disease. These claims were challenged from the outset. Towards the end of his life, and again shortly after his death, many of his machines and conclusions were demonstrated to be intentionally deceptive or false.

== Biography ==
Albert Abrams was born in San Francisco on December 8, 1863, to Marcus Abrams and Rachel Leavey, although other dates have also been reported. On October 8, 1878, he was inscribed at Medical College of the Pacific, worked as an assistant of Prof. Douglass and Prof. Hirschfelder, and got a medical degree on October 30, 1881. Then he allegedly went to Heidelberg, Germany, and graduated there in November 1882 before undertaking further studies in London, Berlin, Vienna, and Paris.

According to Wilson, Abrams was awarded an M.D. by the Cooper College in 1883. He served on the teaching staff of the College for a total of fourteen years: five years (1885–1889) as Demonstrator of Pathology; four years (1890–1893) as Adjunct to the Chair of Clinical Medicine and Demonstrator of Pathology; and five years (1894–1898) as Professor of Pathology.

He was described by one Jewish newspaper as “our talented young professor.” He was elected vice-president of the California State Medical Society in 1889 and was made president of the San Francisco Medico-Chirurgical Society in 1893. In the beginning of the 1900s he had become a respected expert in neurology. From 1904 he was president of the Emanuel Polyclinic in San Francisco.

Abrams published numerous books from 1891 to 1923.

He died January 13, 1924, from a broncho-pneumonia in San Francisco.

== Practice ==
=== Heidelberg doctorate claim ===
Abrams was accused of fraudulently claiming a medical qualification from the University of Heidelberg; however, documents from Archive of the University of Heidelberg confirm that Albert Abrams received a medical degree there on 21 November 1882.

In Abrams' view, American medicine was dominated by physicians with excessive admiration for German doctors and researchers. In earlier writings, he insulted physicians by calling them "Dr. Hades" or "Dr. Inferior", by comparing their looks to typhoid and other germs, and by making fun of various abstruse therapies that at the time were considered "scientific" by the medical establishment. In a poem that he wrote on balloon therapy, for instance, the doctors take their patients up in the air but do not know how to bring the balloon down again. The poem ends with the lines: "But they never came back. That's why we confess / Aëronautic therapy is not a success."

=== Spondylotherapy ===
Abrams developed a medical technique called spondylotherapy, which was inspired by chiropractic and osteopathic ideas. The basic principle is the stimulation of nerves originating from the spinal cord, which can trigger reflex actions on viscera or inner organs. The stimulation is performed by controlled concussion with a plexor / pleximeter combination directly on the spinous processes, by sinusoidal electric currents or by application of ice. Abrams published the book Spondylotherapy in several editions between 1910 and 1918. A simplified version of spondylotherapy was first published by Alva Emeey Gregory, M.D. in 1914.

== Electronic Reactions of Abrams ==
Abrams promoted an idea that electrons were the basic element of all life. He called this ERA, for Electronic Reactions of Abrams, and introduced a number of different machines which he claimed were based on these principles.

=== The machines ===
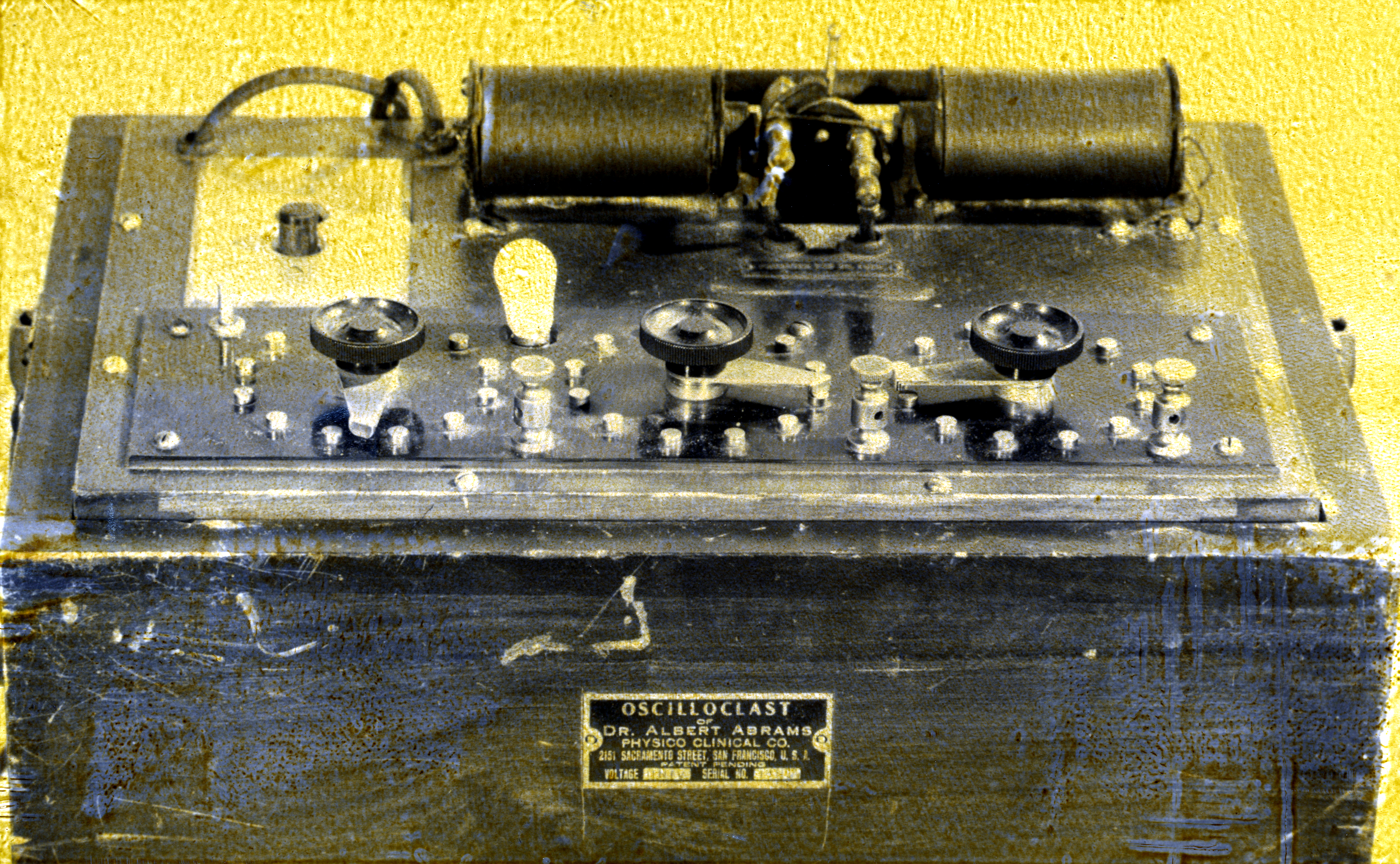
Oscilloclast

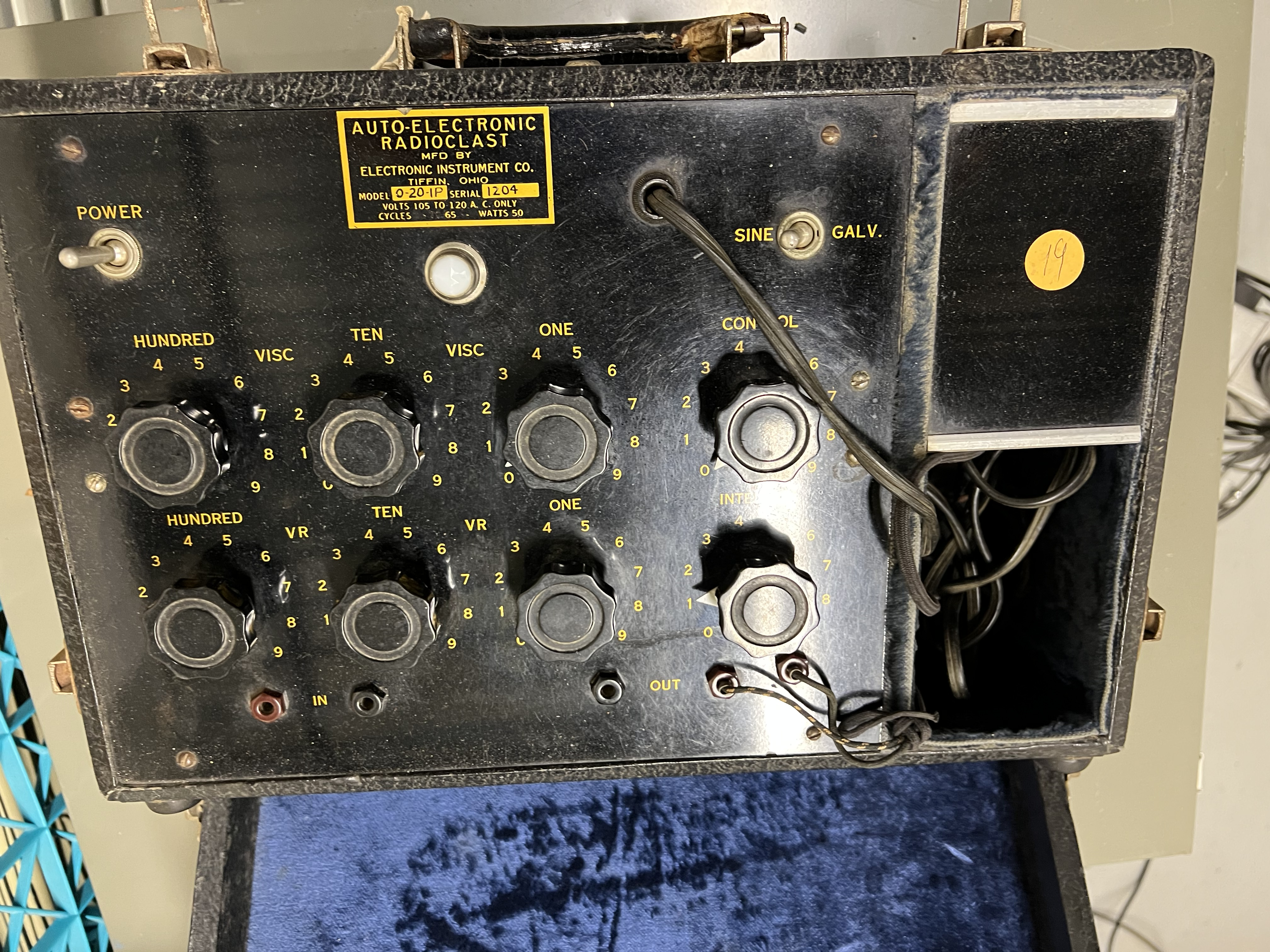
Radioclast

The Dynomizer looked something like a radio, and Abrams claimed it could diagnose any known disease from a single drop of blood or alternatively the subject's handwriting. He performed diagnoses on dried blood samples sent to him on pieces of paper in envelopes through the mail. Apparently Abrams even claimed he could conduct medical practice over the telephone with his machines, and that he could determine personality characteristics.

The Dynomizer was big business; by 1918, courses in spondylotherapy and ERA cost $200 (about the same purchasing power as $3,150 in 2014); equipment was leased at about $200 with a monthly $5 charge thereafter. The lessee had to sign a contract stating the device would never be opened. Abrams explained that this would disrupt their delicate adjustment, but the rule also served to prevent the Abrams devices from being examined. He then widened his claims to treating the diagnosed diseases. Abrams came up with new and even more impressive gadgets, the "Oscilloclast" and the "Radioclast", which came with tables of frequencies that were designed to "attack" specific diseases. Clients were told cures required repeated treatments.

Dynomizer operators tended to give alarming diagnoses, involving combinations of such maladies as cancer, diabetes and syphilis. Abrams often included a disease called "bovine syphilis", unknown to other medical practitioners. He claimed the Oscilloclast was capable of defeating most of these diseases, most of the time.

By 1921, there were claimed to be 3,500 practitioners using ERA technology. Conventional medical practitioners were extremely suspicious. When people opened Abrams's boxes, they found "simple wiring, a few resistors, a small motor that only made a humming noise, and nothing that could in any way perform a diagnosis or 'broadcast' or even produce radio waves."

In the 1970s, Bob DeVries, a product designer for Hewlett-Packard, had a chance to repair an old Oscilloclast (1934). It was owned by a lady whose father had been a president of Abrams' Electronic Medical Foundation and improver of their devices; she had several such devices and believed that electric therapy was beneficial, from her own experience. DeVries not only restored the old oscilloclast to working order but also developed a transistorized version for his client, which they called a "Pulsed Oscillator".

== Investigation ==
The dispute between Abrams and his followers and the American Medical Association (AMA) was intensified. Defenders included American radical author Upton Sinclair and the famously credulous Sir Arthur Conan Doyle, the creator of Sherlock Holmes. Resolution of the dispute through the intervention of a scientifically respected third party was pursued. Scientific American magazine decided to investigate Dr. Abrams' claims. Scientific American was interested in the matter as readers were writing letters to the editor saying that Abrams' revolutionary machines were one of the greatest inventions of the century and so needed to be discussed in the pages of the magazine.

Scientific American assembled a team of investigators who worked with a senior Abrams associate given the pseudonym "Doctor X". The investigators developed a series of tests and the magazine asked readers to suggest their own tests. The investigators asked Doctor X to identify six vials containing unknown pathogens. It seems likely that Doctor X honestly believed in his Abrams machines; in fact, he allowed the Scientific American investigators to observe his procedure. Doctor X got the contents of all six vials completely wrong. He examined the vials and pointed out that they had labels in red ink, which produced vibrations that confounded the instruments. The investigators gave him the vials again with less offensive labels, and he got the contents wrong again.

The results were published in Scientific American, and investigators continued their work. Abrams offered to "cooperate" with the investigators, but always failed to do so on various pretexts. Abrams never actually participated in the investigation, and in ERA publications asserted he was a victim of unjust persecution.

=== Debunking ===
An AMA member sent a blood sample to an Abrams practitioner, and got back a diagnosis that the patient had malaria, diabetes, cancer and syphilis. The blood sample was in fact from a Plymouth Rock rooster.

Similar samples were sent to other Abrams practitioners, and a few found themselves facing fraud charges in court. In a case in Jonesboro, Arkansas, Abrams was called to be a witness, but he died of pneumonia at age 60 shortly before the trial began in January 1924. After his death, investigators with the Food and Drug Administration opened some of the doctor's boxes. One produced a magnetic field, similar to a doorbell; another was a low-powered radio wave transmitter.

Psychologist Donovan Rawcliffe claimed that Abrams' devices had no scientific validity but his successors had "founded a good many special clinics in the United States and their number has by no means diminished in the ensuing years."

== Selected publications ==
- Abrams, Albert (1895). Transactions of the Antiseptic Club. New York: E. B. Treat. [A fictional comedic work on the state of the medical profession]
- Abrams, Albert (1910). Scattered leaves from a physician's diary. St. Louis, Missouri: Fortnightly Press.

== See also ==
- Cults of Unreason by Christopher Evans
- Elizabeth Holmes
- Health fraud
- Royal Raymond Rife
