= Going Clear =

Going Clear may refer to:

- Going Clear (book), a 2013 book on Scientology by Lawrence Wright
  - Going Clear (film), a 2015 documentary by Alex Gibney based on the book
