= USS YP-422 =

United States Navy yard patrol boat

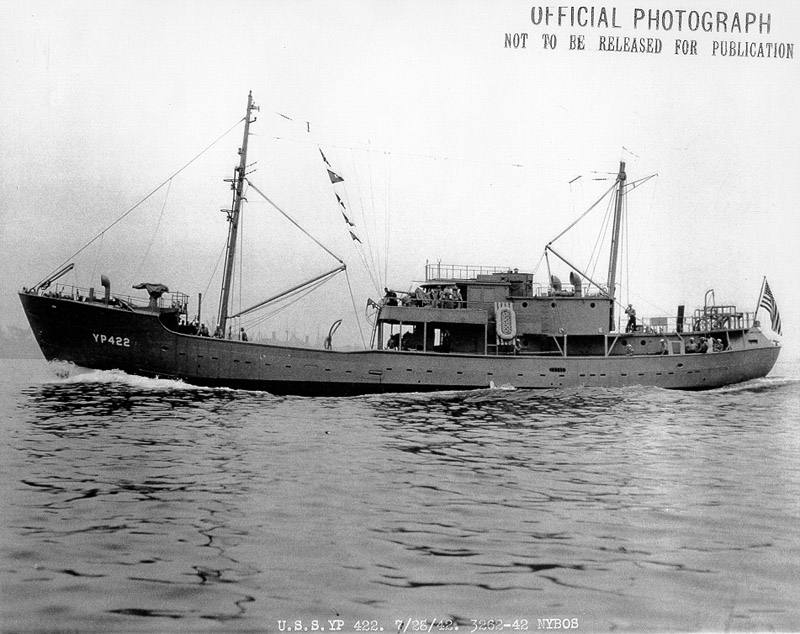
- USS YP-422

History

United States
- Name: YP-422
- Builder: American Ship Building Company, Cleveland, Ohio
- Launched: 1941
- Acquired: 4 June 1942
- Commissioned: 28 July 1942
- Identification: code letters: NFVP
- Fate: Lost by grounding off New Caledonia, 23 April 1943

General characteristics
- Type: Patrol boat
- Length: 133 ft 3 in (40.61 m)
- Beam: 26 ft 1 in (7.95 m)
- Draft: 12 ft 9 in (3.89 m)
- Propulsion: 1 × 650 hp (485 kW) Cooper Bessemer 6-cylinder engine, single shaft
- Armament: 1 × 3 in (76 mm) gun; 2 × .30 cal. machine guns

USS YP-422 was a United States Navy yard patrol (YP) boat that served the United States Navy in World War II from 1942 to 1943. Built in 1941 as the fishing trawler Mist, she was acquired by the US Navy in June 1942 and was converted for naval use by George Lawley & Son of Neponset, Massachusetts. She was commissioned on 28 July 1942 and was put into service to patrol the waters around the Boston Navy Yard. The vessel was lightly armed with a 3-inch gun and two .30 caliber machine guns.

== Service history ==
YP-422 was briefly commanded by Lieutenant L. Ron Hubbard, later known as the controversial founder of Scientology. Hubbard was assigned to Lawley & Son Shipyard, in the Neponset area of Boston, Massachusetts in connection with the conversion of the YP-422 from 25 June to 28 July 1942, when she was placed in commission with Hubbard in command.

Hubbard was relieved of his command on 1 October 1942, a few weeks after YP-422 underwent a 27-hour training exercise in August 1942. A dispatch sent by the Commandant of the Boston Navy Yard on 25 September 1942 described Hubbard as "not temperamentally fitted for independent command". Ironically, Hubbard was then given command of the submarine chaser USS PC-815 which also resulted in his being officially reprimanded and relieved of command.

In early 1943, YP-422 was dispatched to the Pacific theater of operations to support the Solomon Islands campaign. However, she was lost on 23 April 1943 after striking Tumbo Reef, three miles south-east of the entrance to North Bulari Passage – a break in the reefs near Nouméa, New Caledonia.

== See also ==
- Military career of L. Ron Hubbard
- USS PC-815
