= USS PC-815 =

PC-461-class submarine chaser

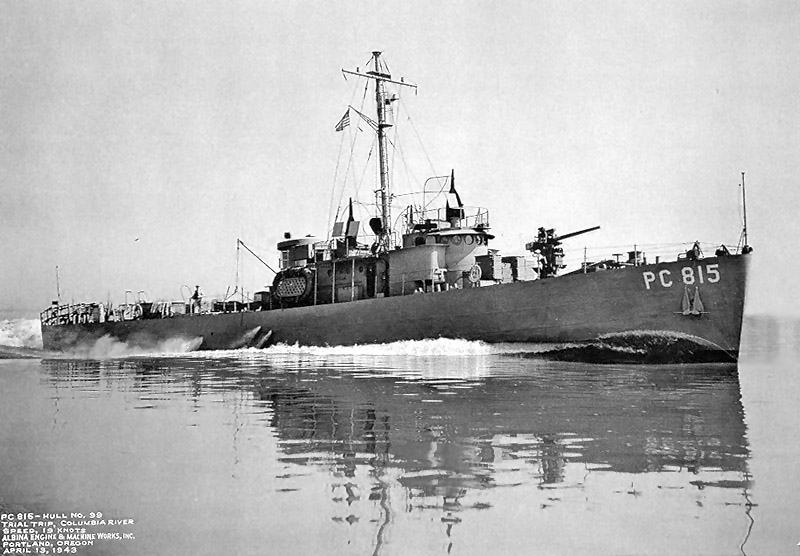
- USS PC-815 running trials 13 April 1943 on the Columbia River

History

United States
- Name: PC-815
- Builder: Albina Engine & Machine Works, Portland, Oregon
- Laid down: 10 October 1942
- Launched: 5 December 1942
- Commissioned: 20 April 1943
- Fate: Sunk after collision with USS Laffey, 11 September 1945, off the coast of San Diego

General characteristics
- Class & type: PC-461-class submarine chaser
- Displacement: 295 tons fully loaded
- Length: 173 ft (53 m)
- Beam: 23 ft (7.0 m)
- Draft: 10 ft 10 in (3.30 m)
- Propulsion: 2 × Hooven-Owens-Rentschler diesel engines (Serial No. 6977 and 6978), two shafts.
- Speed: 20 knots (37 km/h)
- Complement: 59
- Armament: 1 × 3"/50 caliber dual purpose cannon; 1 × Bofors 40 mm gun; 3 × Oerlikon 20 mm cannons; 2 × rocket launchers; 4 (total) × K-guns and mousetraps; 2 × depth charge racks

USS PC-815 was a PC-461-class submarine chaser built for the United States Navy during World War II. Her first commander, for about eighty days in 1943, was L. Ron Hubbard, who later became the founder of Scientology. After Hubbard was removed from command for conducting unauthorized gunnery practice in Mexican territorial waters, PC-815 served as a shore patrol vessel off San Diego, California.

In September 1945, the ship was lost along with one of her crew after colliding with the destroyer USS Laffey. PC-815's short career led to the vessel being dubbed the "jinxed sub-chaser".

== Construction ==
PC-815 was laid down on 10 October 1942, at the Albina Engine and Machinery Works in Portland, Oregon. Her propulsion was two 1,440bhp Hooven-Owens-Rentschler R-99DA diesel engines (Serial No. 6977 and 6978), Westinghouse single reduction gear, two shafts.

PC-815 was fitted out commencing 5 December 1942, and was commissioned on 20 April 1943, with Lieutenant (j.g.) L. Ron Hubbard in command. A few weeks later she sailed down the Columbia River to Astoria, Oregon, where she arrived on 17 May to take on supplies.

On 18 May, PC-815 left Astoria for Bremerton, Washington, where she was to have radar and depth charge launchers fitted. Her journey was interrupted by an air-sea rescue operation, then was resumed with a new destination — San Diego.

== The "jinxed sub-chaser" ==
=== Claims of submarine contact off Cape Lookout ===
In the early hours of 19 May 1943, the crew of PC-815 detected what Hubbard thought was first one, then later two Imperial Japanese Navy submarines approximately 10 nautical miles (19 km) off the shore of Cape Lookout, Oregon. Both the sonar operator and Lt. Hubbard thought that the echo of an active sonar ping, combined with apparent engine noises heard through the ship's hydrophone, indicated contact with a submarine.

Over the next 68 hours, the ship expended 37 depth charges in a "battle" that also involved the U.S. Navy blimps K-39 and K-33, the United States Coast Guard patrol boats Bonham and 78302, and the subchasers USS SC-536 and USS SC-537, all summoned to act as reinforcements. PC-815 was finally ordered back to base on 21 May.

In his eighteen-page after-action report, Hubbard claimed to have "definitely sunk, beyond doubt" one submarine and critically damaged another. However, the subsequent investigation by the Commander NW Sea Frontier, Vice Admiral Frank Jack Fletcher, cast a skeptical light on Hubbard's claims. His summary memorandum to Fleet Admiral Chester W. Nimitz, stated:

It is noted that the report of PC 815 is not in accordance with "Anti-Submarine Action by Surface Ship" (ASW-1) which should be submitted to Commander in Chief, U.S. Fleet. An analysis of all reports convinces me that there was no submarine in the area. Lieutenant Commander Sullivan states that he was unable to obtain any evidence of a submarine except one bubble of air which is unexplained except by turbulence of water due to a depth charge explosion. The Commanding Officers of all ships except the PC-815 state they had no evidence of a submarine and do not think a submarine was in the area.

Fletcher added that "there is a known magnetic deposit in the area in which depth charges were dropped", absolving the responding blimps from any fault, because their method of detecting submarines relied on a Magnetic Anomaly Detector. This also implied that Lt. Hubbard and his crew were operating the ship's sonar equipment incorrectly. After the war, British and American analysis of captured Japanese Navy records confirmed that no Japanese submarines had been lost off the Oregon coast. Hubbard, however, never accepted that he had been mistaken about the "battle." Both he and Tom Moulton, one of his officers, claimed that the official denials of any Japanese submarine presence off the Pacific coast had been motivated by a desire to avoid panic among the U.S. population. Years later, Hubbard told Scientologists:

I dropped the I-76 or the Imperial Japanese Navy Trans-Pacific Submarine down into the mouth of the Columbia River, dead duck. And it went down with a resounding furor. And that was that. I never thought about it again particularly except to get mad at all the admirals I had to make reports to because of this thing, see? This was one out of seventy-nine separate actions that I had to do with. And it had no significance, see? But the other day I was kind of tired, and my dad suddenly sprung on me the fact that my submarine had been causing a tremendous amount of difficulty in the mouth of the Columbia River. Hadn't thought about this thing for years. Of course, it's all shot to ribbons, this thing. It's got jagged steel sticking out at all ends and angles, and it's a big submarine! It's a — I don't know, about the size of the first Narwhal that we built. And the fishermen coming in there and fishing are dragging their nets around in that area, and it's just tearing their nets to ribbons — they've even hired a civilian contractor to try to blow the thing up and get it the devil out of there — and has evidently been raising bob with postwar fishing here for more years than I'd care to count.

However, the mouth of the Columbia River is some 75 miles north of Cape Lookout, the area in which Hubbard's naval reports claimed his anti-submarine action took place.

Moreover, the Japanese submarine I-76 (renamed I-176 by that time) was based in Truk and operated only in the south Pacific during the time when Hubbard was in command of PC-815. The I-176 was sunk in the Coral Sea in May 1944 and removed from the Japanese Navy List on 10 July 1944 – a year after Hubbard was relieved of command of the PC-815.

=== Unauthorized shelling of Coronado Islands and failure to follow orders ===
In June 1943, the PC-815 traveled to San Diego, which was to become her home port. She arrived there on 2 June, and at the end of June was ordered to sea to join an anti-submarine training exercise. The exercise, held on 28 June, ended early. Hubbard took the opportunity to order an impromptu gunnery exercise while anchored just off the Mexican territory of South Coronado Island, to the south-west of San Diego. The Mexican government sent an official protest to the U.S. Government, as no gunnery operations had been scheduled.

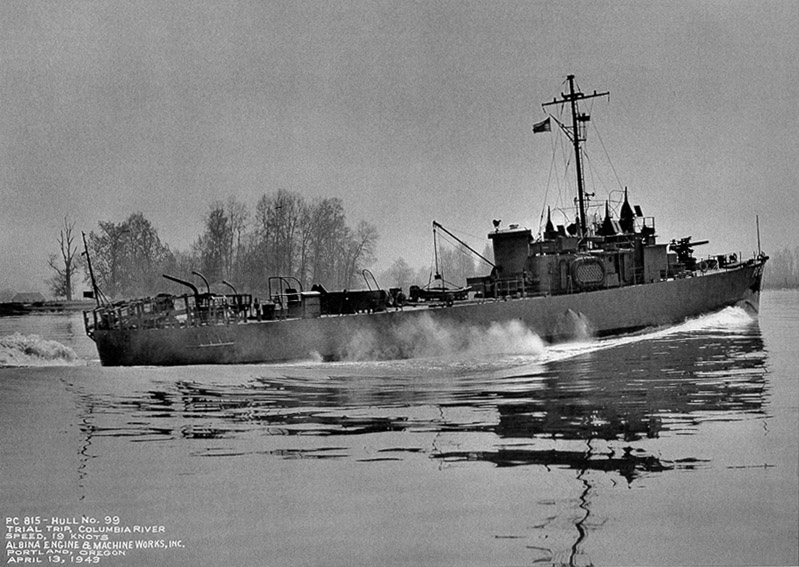
Another view of USS PC-815 on trials.

On 30 June a Board of Investigation was convened concerning PC-815. It concluded that Hubbard had disregarded orders, both by conducting gunnery practice and by anchoring in Mexican territorial waters without proper authority. His orders stated that the PC-815 was supposed to return after completing that day's training. Hubbard argued that his crew was inexperienced, it was foggy, and he was tired so he did not return to port as ordered. But a month earlier in his after action report concerning the fiasco off Cape Lookout, he had described the same men as "experienced" and "highly skilled".

Vice Admiral Fletcher, who both chaired the board and read the prior after action report, rated Hubbard "below average" and noted: "Consider this officer lacking in the essential qualities of judgment, leadership and cooperation. He acts without forethought as to probable results. He is believed to have been sincere in his efforts to make his ship efficient and ready. Not considered qualified for command or promotion at this time. Recommend duty on a large vessel where he can be properly supervised". Hubbard was relieved of command effective 7 July 1943.

== Collision with USS Laffey ==
After Hubbard was replaced, PC-815 remained in San Diego as a shore patrol vessel, but appears to have been mostly inactive. According to her Movement Card she took part in the occasional offshore patrol, participated in training exercises, and escorted submarines in and out of the harbor. She was restored to active duty on 2 September 1945, but at 6:47 a.m. on 11 September, the ship collided with the destroyer USS Laffey in dense fog off San Diego. The collision started a fire on board PC-815, which sank within five minutes. One man from PC-815 was recorded as missing, presumed drowned. The Laffey suffered significant damage, with the fire from PC-815 spreading into one of the destroyer's compartments.

Navy divers demolished the wreck in early November 1945 due to the navigation hazard that it posed to a busy shipping channel. It is reported to be lying at 32°37′54″N 117°14′12″W in 90 feet (27 m) of water and is said to be diveable.

== See also ==
- List of patrol vessels of the United States Navy
- Military career of L. Ron Hubbard
- USS YP-422
