= Women of the Streets =

Women of the Streets: A Sociological Study of the Common Prostitute
- Author: Rosalind Wilkinson (uncredited); C. H. Rolph, editor
- Language: English
- Subject: Prostitution in England
- Genre: non-fiction: case reports
- Publisher: Secker and Warburg, British Social Biology Council
- Publication date: 1955
- Publication place: United Kingdom
- Media type: Print
- Pages: xvi, 248
- OCLC: 978291

Women of the Streets: A Sociological Study of the Common Prostitute is a sociological examination of prostitution in England by Rosalind Wilkinson, based on official records and on interviews with working prostitutes in London. Her report was published in reduced form in 1955 by Secker and Warburg for the British Social Biology Council, credited to the editor, C. H. Rolph. Wilkinson's research had been sponsored with the expectation that it would provide evidence for reforms to reduce or eliminate prostitution, but she concluded that many prostitutes had made a rational choice.

== Background ==
Postwar Britain had a widely perceived prostitution problem, with a 1951 estimate placing the number of prostitutes in London at 10,000 and the number of sexual transactions per week at 250,000. In 1949, the British Social Biology Council, an organisation for the preservation of the family in the United Kingdom, commissioned Rosalind Wilkinson, a 24-year-old social work researcher, to survey prostitutes and write a report on her findings. The objective was to identify reasons for the women having taken up prostitution that could be ameliorated by reforms; Wilkinson was instructed to inquire into the women's early lives and to conceal her purpose. The Metropolitan Police and the Home Office endorsed the project. The London School of Economics provided a grant underwriting the collection of statistics on arrests and prosecutions for soliciting; sex for money was not an offence in itself, but the term common prostitute was used in law to define forbidden street prostitution.

== Research and publication ==
After researching police and criminal records, Wilkinson embedded herself in the London streetwalking milieu, making friends with and extensively interviewing 69 working prostitutes in 1951–52. Perceiving undercover work as dishonest and an impediment to receiving frank answers, she was honest with them about who she was and why she was asking questions: "I was at ease and could give my attention to the girl instead of being afraid of being found out, and she talked freely about prostitution because that was the reason for our relationship." She accepted their accounts of why they had become prostitutes rather than probing their backgrounds to find possible causes.

Wilkinson's report concluded that her interviewees had made a conscious choice to become prostitutes; other work was available to them, few entered prostitution at the urging of or under coercion by pimps, and fines and imprisonment were not deterring them. The prostitute had a job in which she felt needed, worked regular hours, and, Wilkinson wrote, "most important of all, ... she finds herself in the company of people who are like herself in personality and outlook." The prostitutes she interviewed had developed a business vocabulary and offered each other mutual support which Wilkinson identified as "something of a work organization". A London street prostitute was earning "far more than she could in any job open to her": £10 to £25 a week, as opposed to £3 to £4 a week in a working-class job. Women were paid less than men, making it very difficult for them to live alone and almost impossible for a woman to raise a child alone. Wilkinson wrote, "I ceased to ask myself, 'Why are these women prostitutes?' and began to ask 'Why are other women not prostitutes?'" She suggested that the prostitutes might be less of a social problem than their customers.

The British Social Biology Council had originally intended a broader study; Wilkinson found that her interviewing required too much time and the scope was curtailed. On completion of her report, she expressed the opinion that it should not be published, but was concerned that publication of a censored version would damage her reputation as a social worker. The Council made extensive cuts and published the report in 1955 as Women of the Streets: A Sociological Study of the Common Prostitute, credited only to the editor, C. H. Rolph, a pen name of the former Chief Inspector of the City of London Police C. R. Hewitt. The published version was also censored by the Home Office. Wilkinson's report was approximately 200,000 words long, but the Council also required it to be cut to 90,000 words. Rolph wrote in his autobiography that Wilkinson's report was "so vivid and human and at the same time so factual and carefully documented that I should like to see it published unchanged." He described the cuts he made as "butchery", and Wilkinson sued on copyright grounds over them. In his introduction, Rolph characterised her research as "incomplete and inconclusive" and an inadequate basis for recommendations to resolve the prostitution problem, while praising her "perceptive feminine subjectiveness". The book was reissued by the New English Library in 1961.

The book is based on case histories of prostitutes working in Central London and Stepney, including the 69 whom Wilkinson interviewed at length. Appendices summarise 50 selected case histories, comparative statistics for 1946 and 1949 from the Metropolitan Police, and files from the Criminal Record Office for 150 women convicted of prostitution offences in 1949.

== Reception ==
Women of the Streets received notice in the press, primarily as evidence of the prostitution problem. Jeanne Heal wrote that it would "shock the social conscience of Britain" and revealed an "embarrassment to ordinary citizens going about the streets of the metropolis".

It was reviewed in a number of social science journals. The reviewer for The Howard Journal of Criminal Justice found the book most interesting for the author's insights into the emotional background of her interviewees, including her impression that many "had had unsatisfactory early experiences", and found it "sociologically interesting" that after "drift[ing] into prostitution" they were sometimes in a more stable social situation. The reviewer in The Eugenics Review referred to the social stability as "the tragic fact that the maladjusted personality very often finds for the first time, amongst practising prostitutes, a friendliness and camaraderie unencountered in the spheres of respectability." The reviewer in Mental Health suggested that the women formed "ties ... which tend to hold them to this kind of life." A reviewer in The Spectator wrote that the report "offer[ed] valuable starting-points for a wider and fully organised research" into the problem of prostitution, but the reviewer in The British Journal of Delinquency found the book depressing because it did not suggest solutions and "all the familiar proposals of would-be reformers are shown to be somewhat futile." In his 1959 article on prostitutes, Wayland Young found it "excellent within its limits, which are that it includes no call-girls and hardly touches on the prostitutes' sex-lives."

== Evidence on juvenile prostitution and race relations ==
Wilkinson's research showed that some London prostitutes had begun while as young as 16. The Mental Health reviewer drew attention to "a group of girls in Stepney" who make up the majority of the detailed case histories; 19 prostitutes, almost all juveniles, who were living communally with Indian immigrants in bombed-out quarters. The book characterised Stepney, to a lesser degree Hyde Park and Paddington, as particularly attractive to runaway girls and girls who had been in approved schools, because its racially mixed population and lack of competition from established prostitutes meant they could operate without renting a suitable flat, using cars, hotel rooms, and open spaces and sometimes exchanging sex for a bed. The report describes this group as "mentally, physically and morally in a lower grade than the ordinary prostitute", and it gave rise to use of the term "Stepney problem" for girls from approved schools and other deprived backgrounds being drawn to prostitution in London. Wilkinson discovered that whereas prostitutes in Soho, Mayfair and Victoria were arrested repeatedly, in Piccadilly Circus many were soliciting so briefly that they were never arrested, and the juveniles in Stepney were largely unknown to the police; she estimated that the total number of prostitutes in London was therefore higher than had been thought. One runaway juvenile prostitute interviewed by Wilkinson in Stepney had spasticity and was institutionalised after being arrested for soliciting. Wilkinson subsequently gave evidence on prostitution to the Wolfenden Committee, whose report was published in 1957. Her statement that "Prostitution is a way of life consciously chosen because it suits a woman's personality in particular circumstances" was much quoted and divorced from her evidence there and in Women of the Streets of girls having been failed by institutions and charities.

Many of the subjects in Stepney lived for a time with immigrants, including Caribbean blacks, Maltese, and Irish. The book is one of several sources from the 1920s on that document how runaway girls and women found acceptance in mixed areas and sometimes formed families with black men; relatively few Caribbean immigrants were women, and the men found themselves rejected by British society and in Wilkinson's words, were "often forced to form associations with the class who will associate with them". Contrary to the fear at the time of blacks and Maltese coercing women into prostitution, the report shows that prostitutes' relationships with immigrant men were often voluntary and mutually satisfactory. Wilkinson's interviewees gave loneliness and the need for stability as reasons for living with men who were classified by the law as pimps or 'ponces', and she found that most of the men were also young and many were also from 'broken homes'.
