= C. R. Hewitt =

British police officer, journalist, editor, and writer (1901-1994)

Cecil Rolph ("Bill") Hewitt (1901–1994) was a British police officer, journalist, editor, and writer. He served with the City of London Police from 1921 to 1946, rising to the level of Chief Inspector. He then left the force and became a journalist, writing on issues such as censorship and capital punishment. Known as C.R. Hewitt, he also wrote many books and articles, such as Believe What You Like, under the pen name of C.H. Rolph.

As C.H. Rolph he was a founding member of the Homosexual Law Reform Society, of which he served as Chairman in the 1960s.

He was on the editorial staff of the New Statesman (1947–1970), where he "acquired an outstanding reputation as one of the foremost commentators in the country on legal and social matters". He also contributed to the Encyclopædia Britannica, Chambers Encyclopedia, Punch, The Week-End Book, The New Law Journal, The Times Literary Supplement, and The Author.

== Bibliography ==
This is a partial bibliography. With the exceptions noted below the books listed here were all published under the name C. H. Rolph.

- Women of the Streets: A Sociological Study of the Common Prostitute (Secker & Warburg, 1955, OCLC 978291). Edited by C. H. Rolph for and on behalf of the British Social Biology Council
- Personal Identity (Michael Joseph, 1957)
- Mental Disorder: A brief examination of the Report of the Royal Commission on the Law relating to Mental Illness and Mental Deficiency, 1954-1957 (National Association for Mental Health, 1958)
- Before the Beak (Newman Neame Take Home Books, London, 1958)
- The Trial of Lady Chatterley: Regina v. Penguin Books Limited (Penguin Books, 1961). The transcript of the trial.R v Penguin Books Ltd
- Hanged by the Neck: An Exposure of Capital Punishment in England with Arthur Koestler (Penguin Books, 1961)
- Common Sense About Crime and Punishment (Victor Gollancz (London) and Macmillan (United States), 1961)
- Does Pornography Matter? (Routledge & Kegan Paul, 1961. Republished in 1972 under ISBN 0-8369-2651-X) (Edited by C. H. Rolph)
- The Police and the Public (Heinemann, 1962)
- All Those in Favour?: An Account of the High Court Action Against the Electrical Trades' Union and its Officers for Ballot-Rigging in the Election of Union Officials (Andre Deutsch, 1962). Prepared from the official court transcript.
- Law and the Common Man (Charles C. Thomas, United States, 1967)
- Books in the Dock (HarperCollins, 1969, ISBN 0-233-95901-7)
- Kingsley: The Life, Letters and Diaries of Kingsley Martin (Littlehampton Book Services, 1973, ISBN 0-575-01636-1)
- Believe What You Like: What happened between the Scientologists and the National Association for Mental Health (Andre Deutsch, 1973, ISBN 0-233-96375-8)
- Living Twice: An Autobiography (Littlehampton Book Services, 1974, ISBN 0-575-01750-3)
- Mr. Prone: A Week in the Life of an Ignorant Man (Oxford University Press, 1977, ISBN 0-19-212966-X)
- The Queen's Pardon (Cassell, London, 1978. Some sources say Littlehampton Book Services, 1978, ISBN 0-304-30030-6 is the first edition)
- The Police (Wayland, Hove, 1980)
- London Particulars (Oxford University Press, 1980, ISBN 0-19-211755-6) First of a two-part memoir of his life, covers his boyhood prior to World War I.
- Further Particulars (Oxford University Press, 1987, ISBN 0-19-211790-4). Second of a two-part memoir, as a City of London Chief Inspector of Police and as a journalist, broadcaster and social activist.
- Letters to Both Women (Bishop Wilton, 1990, ISBN 0-947828-10-9) A collection of letters by C. H. Rolph written to between 1938 and 1988.

== Articles ==
C. R. Hewitt also contributed to periodicals under the name C. H. Rolph. This is a partial bibliography.

- Police Duties. 200 points in police law with an appendix of examination questions (Police Review Publishing Co, London, 1936) The author is uncredited in the publication but it is apparently by C. R. Hewitt.
- A Licensing Handbook by C. R. Hewitt (Police Review Publishing Co, London, 1947)
- Crime and Punishment (Current Affairs, no. 112, 14 pages with illustrations, 1950)
- The Law is Yours (Daily Mirror, London, 1964)
- As I Was Saying (Police Review, London, 1985)
