= Believe What You Like =

1973 book by C. R. Hewitt

- Cover
- Author: C. H. Rolph
- Language: English
- Subject: Mental health, Scientology
- Genre: Non-fiction
- Publisher: Andre Deutsch
- Publication date: 1973
- Publication place: Great Britain
- Media type: Print
- ISBN: 0-233-96375-8
- OCLC: 815558
- Dewey Decimal: 131/.35
- LC Class: BP605.S2 H47

Believe What You Like: What happened between the Scientologists and the National Association for Mental Health is written by the New Statesman director C. R. Hewitt under the pen name C. H. Rolph. It details a public dispute between the Church of Scientology and the National Association for Mental Health (now known as Mind) in Britain.

== Main points ==
The book covers the controversy of how, starting in 1969, members of the Church joined the NAMH in large numbers with the intent to change the organization from the inside. The Scientologists attempted to ratify as official policy a number of points concerning the treatment of psychiatric patients, and in so doing, secretly promoted Scientology's anti-psychiatry agenda. When their identity was realized, the Scientologists were expelled from the organization en masse, but later sued the NAMH over the matter in the High Court in 1971 and lost. The case was important in UK charity law.

The book also covers the origins and activities of the Church of Scientology in the UK and some of their other legal actions in the UK around that time, including:

- The libel case against Geoffrey Johnson Smith.
- Hubbard's legal difficulties getting Saint Hill Manor registered as a place of religious worship.
- The Church's libel suit against two Melbourne judges, Justice Kevin Anderson and Judge Gordon Just.
- Scientology front groups called the Campaign Against Psychiatric Atrocities and AHDA (Association For Health Development And Aid).

== See also ==
- Bibliography of books critical of Scientology
- Scientology controversies
- Scientology and psychiatry
- Foster Report — Enquiry into the Practice and Effects of Scientology
- Kenneth Robinson (British politician)
- Fair game (Scientology)
