= Cults of Unreason =

1973 book by Christopher Riche Evans

- 1974 ed. Book cover
- Author: Christopher Riche Evans
- Cover artist: Paul Agule (jacket design)
- Language: English
- Subject: Cults, pseudoscience
- Publisher: Harrap, Farrar, Straus and Giroux, Delacorte Press
- Publication date: 1973, 1974, 1975
- Publication place: United States
- Media type: Print (Paperback)
- Pages: 257 (UK:259)
- ISBN: 0-374-13324-7; ISBN 978-0-374-13324-5; ISBN 0-440-54402-5; ISBN 978-0-440-54402-9; UK 0245-518703
- OCLC: 863421
- Dewey Decimal: 133/.06
- LC Class: BF1999 .E83 1974
- Followed by: Landscapes of the Night – how and why we dream

Cults of Unreason is a non-fiction book on atypical belief systems, written by Christopher Riche Evans, who was a noted computer scientist and an experimental psychologist. It was first published in the UK in 1973 by Harrap and in the United States in 1974 by Farrar, Straus and Giroux, in paperback in 1975, by Delacorte Press, and in German, by Rowohlt, in 1976.

Evans discusses Scientology and Dianetics, UFO religions, believers in Atlantis, biofeedback, Yoga, Eastern religions, and black boxes. He points out that these systems and groups incorporate technological advances within a theological framework, and that part of their appeal is due to the failure of modern people to find strength, comfort, and community in traditional religion and in science.

In 2001, new religious movement specialist George Chryssides criticized the book's title by pointing out that most groups referred to as cults do have well-defined beliefs.
