= Going Clear (book) =

2013 non-fiction book about Scientology written by Lawrence Wright

Going Clear: Scientology, Hollywood, and the Prison of Belief
- Hardcover, US first edition, Knopf, 2013
- Author: Lawrence Wright
- Cover artist: Peter Mendelsund
- Language: English
- Subject: Scientology
- Genre: Non-fiction
- Publisher: Alfred A. Knopf (US)
- Publication date: January 17, 2013
- Publication place: United States
- Media type: Print (Hardcover)
- Pages: 448
- ISBN: 978-0-307-70066-7

Going Clear: Scientology, Hollywood, and the Prison of Belief is a 2013 non-fiction book about Scientology written by Lawrence Wright.

The book contains interviews with current and former Scientologists, the histories of founder L. Ron Hubbard and current leader David Miscavige, and analysis of the relationships of Tom Cruise and John Travolta to the organization. In an interview with The New York Times Wright said: "There are a lot of people out there who were very high up in the church and know a lot about it who have become outspoken... I'm very lucky to come along at a time when a lot of these people are ready to talk". Wright also disclosed that he had received "innumerable" letters threatening legal action from lawyers representing Scientology and celebrities who belong to it. Wright spoke to two hundred current and former Scientologists for the book.

The title of the book, Going Clear, is in reference to a stage of spiritual development in Scientology. In Scientology parlance, "Clear" means a state of having freed oneself from "subconscious memories of past trauma". Scientologists go through therapy sessions called "auditing" as part of the process of becoming Clear.

Wright had previously written a profile of former Scientologist Paul Haggis for The New Yorker.

== Reception ==
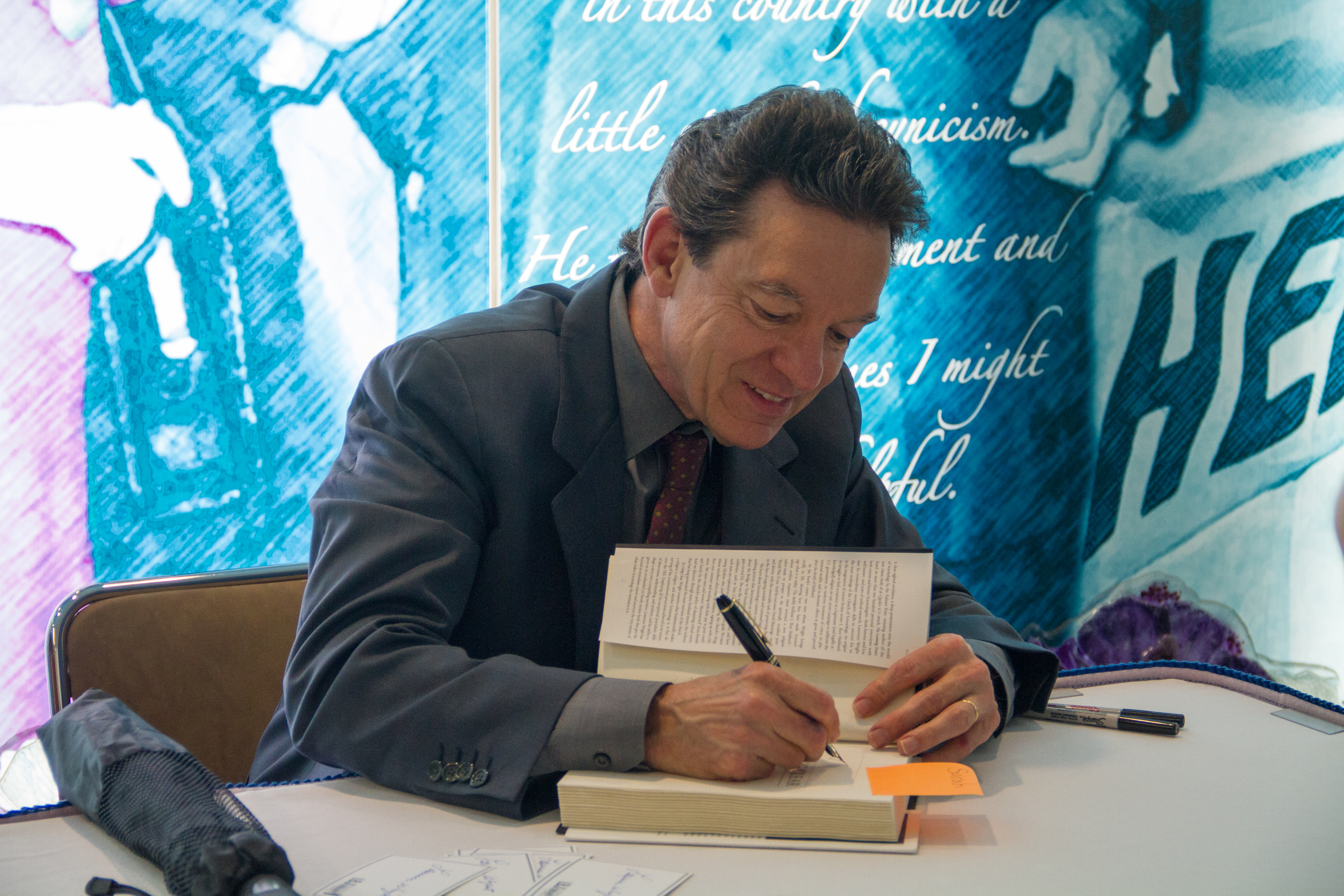
Lawrence Wright signing a copy of Going Clear

The New York Times published Michael Kinsley's review of the book, where he wrote: "That crunching sound you hear is Lawrence Wright bending over backward to be fair to Scientology. Every deceptive comparison with ... other religions is given a respectful hearing. Every ludicrous bit of church dogma is served up deadpan. This makes the book's indictment that much more powerful".

Clark Collis reviewed the book for Entertainment Weekly, writing:

Lawrence Wright, who won a Pulitzer for 2006's The Looming Tower: Al-Qaeda and the Road to 9/11, interviewed roughly 200 current and former Scientologists for the book, which began as a 2011 New Yorker article written with Haggis' cooperation. You can feel the heft of the research as he details Hubbard's establishment of the church in the '50s, its globe-spanning infiltration of government agencies in the '70s, and the more recent alleged physical abuse suffered by some members (the Church of Scientology denies many of the claims...) Going Clear is peppered with examples of the church lavishly accommodating its A-list members, particularly Tom Cruise, if not always dealing so well with its famous congregants' quips.

Karen Swartz reviewed the book for Nova Religio: The Journal of Alternative and Emergent Religions, writing that Wright achieved his goal for the book, providing “a rich history that engages current questions”, while allowing for a “more nuanced discourse” of the meaning of religion, while perpetuating a “heavily Protestant understanding”. She also commented that the author recognized the lack of information provided by the Church of Scientology and encouraged readers to research further.

Joshi Herrmann of the Evening Standard wrote that "the revelations in Going Clear depict a frightening organisation, capable of imprisoning people often without keeping them imprisoned".

Transworld Publishers, who were to publish the book in the United Kingdom on the same day other publishers around the world released the book, cancelled at the last moment. The book was published in the UK three years later by Silvertail Books, the same publisher for John Sweeney's book The Church of Fear: Inside the Weird World of Scientology. Sweeney speculated that the reason Transworld backed out of their contract for Wright's book was the litigious nature of the Church of Scientology, combined with the strong libel laws in England. According to Sweeney: "You don't need capital to publish a book on Scientology – you need courage".

The Church of Scientology denied the contents of the book, putting out an official statement and publishing a website.

Wright's German publisher, Random House Publishing Group, provided the web addresses of the Church of Scientology's published responses in a disclaimer in the front of the German edition, and a disclaimer that none of the stories contained in the book concern the German branch of the church.

== Awards and honors ==
The book was a finalist for the National Book Award for Nonfiction, and was shortlisted for the 2013 National Book Critics Circle Award. It won the nonfiction Carr P. Collins prize of the Texas Institute of Letters.

== Film adaptation ==
The book was adapted into a documentary film by HBO, directed by Alex Gibney, and premiered at the Sundance Film Festival on January 25, 2015. It had been stated by HBO documentary films chief Sheila Nevins that HBO had 160 lawyers review the film out of concerns about litigation by the Church of Scientology. This was later called hyperbole by Gibney, though the film was scrutinized by HBO's lawyers.

== See also ==
- Bibliography of books critical of Scientology
- Scientology controversies
