= Christopher Evans (computer scientist) =

British computer scientist and author (1931–1979)

Christopher Riche Evans
- Born: 29 May 1931; Aberdyfi, Wales
- Died: 10 October 1979 (aged 48)
- Citizenship: United Kingdom
- Education: University College London, University of Reading
- Known for: Pioneers of Computing recordings (1970s); The Mighty Micro (1979 book and TV series)
- Children: 2
- Scientific career
- Fields: Computer science, parapsychology
- Workplaces: Royal Air Force, Duke University, University of Reading, National Physical Laboratory

Christopher Riche Evans (29 May 1931 – 10 October 1979) was a British computer scientist and author.

== Biography ==
Born in Aberdyfi, Christopher Evans spent his childhood in Wales and was educated at Christ College, Brecon (1941–1949). He spent two years in the RAF (1950–1952), and worked as a science journalist and writer until 1957, when he began a B.A. course in Psychology at University College London, graduating with honours in 1960. After a summer fellowship at Duke University in the United States, where he first met his American wife, Nancy Fullmer, he took up a research assistant post in the Physics Laboratory, University of Reading, working on eye movements under Robert Ditchburn. Upon receiving his PhD (the title of his thesis was "Pattern Perception and the Stabilised Retinal Image"), he went to the Division of Computer Science, National Physical Laboratory, Teddington, in 1964, where he remained until his death from cancer in 1979. Three years before his death, the newly formed Committee for the Scientific Investigation of Claims of the Paranormal (CSICOP) made Evans a fellow (1976-1979) and served as a consulting editor for the magazine Skeptical Inquirer

== Works ==
In 1979, Christopher Evans wrote a book about the oncoming microcomputer revolution, The Mighty Micro: The Impact of the Computer Revolution, which included predictions for the future up to the year 2000. This book was also printed in the US as The Micro Millennium (New York: The Viking Press, ISBN 0-670-47400-2). He subsequently scripted and presented for ATV a six-part television series based on this book and broadcast posthumously by ITV between October and December 1979.

His other books include Cults of Unreason, a study of Scientology and other pseudoscience, and Landscapes of the Night: How and Why We Dream.

In the 1970s, Evans undertook a set of interviews with computer pioneers such as Konrad Zuse and Grace Hopper. These were released through the Science Museum, London, as Pioneers of Computing, a set of cassette tapes.

Christopher Evans also edited two anthologies of psychological science fiction/horror stories, Mind at Bay and Mind in Chains, a collection of science writings, Cybernetics: Key Papers, a reference book Psychology: A Dictionary of Mind, Brain and Behaviour, and was a contributing editor to the science magazine Omni. A keen pilot, he also edited a yearly pilot's diary of rural airfields in Great Britain.

Evans had a significant friendship and collaboration with the writer J. G. Ballard. Together around 1968 they developed ideas for a play about a car crash, offered to the Institute of Contemporary Arts but not produced. Later came an exhibition of crashed cars at The New Arts Lab in London in 1970, and ultimately Ballard's novel Crash, published in 1973. Evans' charismatic appearance as a "hoodlum scientist" (in Ballard's description) was an inspiration for the character of Dr Robert Vaughan in Crash. Evans also appears in Ballard's fictionalised life story The Kindness of Women as the psychologist Dr Richard Sutherland. Ballard recounts his friendship with Evans in his autobiography Miracles of Life.

During the 1970s, Evans was the scientific advisor to the ITV TV series, The Tomorrow People.

Christopher Evans died of cancer in 1979, at the age of 48, shortly after The Mighty Micro had been published in hardcover and before the broadcast of the TV programmes.

== Selected works ==
Cults of Unreason

- Evans, Christopher (1973). Cults of Unreason (hardcover ed.). London: Harrap. ISBN 978-0-245-51870-6.
- Evans, Christopher (1974). Cults of Unreason (paperback ed.). St Albans, Hertfordshire, UK: Panther Books. ISBN 978-0-586-03905-2.
- Evans, Christopher (1974). Cults of Unreason (hardcover ed.). New York: Farrar, Straus & Giroux. ISBN 978-0-374-13324-5.
- Evans, Christopher (1975). Cults of Unreason (paperback ed.). New York: Delacorte Press. ISBN 978-0-440-54402-9.

The Mighty Micro

- Evans, Christopher (1979). The Mighty Micro (hardcover ed.). London: Victor Gollancz Ltd. ISBN 978-0-575-02708-4.
- Evans, Christopher (1980). The Mighty Micro (paperback ed.). London: Coronet. ISBN 978-0-340-25975-7.

As editor

- Evans, Christopher (1969). Mind at Bay (paperback ed.). Panther. ISBN 978-0-586-02902-2.
- Evans, Christopher (1970). Mind in Chains (paperback ed.). Panther. ISBN 978-0-586-03423-1.
