= Purefoy =

Purefoy is a surname. Notable people with the surname include:

- Edward Bagwell Purefoy (1868–1960), British army officer and lepidopterist
- James Purefoy (born 1964), English actor
- Robert Purefoy, also Robert Parfew (d. 1557), bishop of Hereford
- William Purefoy (c. 1580–1659), one of the regicides of Charles I of England
- George Purefoy-Jervoise (1770–1847), English politician

== See also ==
- Wilfred Bagwell Purefoy (1862–1930), British breeder of racehorses
- Purifoy
- Purify
