= New York Rescue Workers Detoxification Project =

American organization found in 2003

- Formation: 2003
- Headquarters: New York City, New York, U.S.
- Official language: English
- Director: Jim Woodworth
- Parent organization: Church of Scientology
- Website: detoxacademy.org

The New York Rescue Workers Detoxification Project was founded in New York City in 2003 with the stated purpose of treating rescue workers for toxins inhaled from the smoke of the September 11 attacks. It has two clinics: Downtown Medical on Fulton Street, two blocks from the site of the World Trade Center, and another at Williston Park, Long Island. The project's co-founder and top fundraiser is actor Tom Cruise. It uses the Purification Rundown, a detoxification program invented by L. Ron Hubbard as part of Scientology's Bridge to Total Freedom. This rundown has been criticized by many doctors as pseudoscientific and medically dangerous. It was reported in October 2007 that 838 people had completed the New York program.

The project has been supported by some public officials, and received some public funding, but received criticism for its financial ties to the Church of Scientology, for exposing rescue workers to potential medical dangers, and for discouraging use of orthodox medicine. Sources in the Fire Department told a reporter that several participants had joined Scientology, even disconnecting from their families.

== Background ==
=== Tom Cruise criticises EPA ===
Tom Cruise explained his motivation for setting up the project in a Scientology promotional video that leaked onto the internet in January 2008. The Environmental Protection Agency had stated after the World Trade Center attack that the air was safe to breathe. The video narration contradicted this, saying, "The devastation had spread an unprecedented combination of toxins through the air — and it was lethal." Cruise is seen dismissing the EPA's all-clear:

Of course, as a Scientologist, you go, that's a lie. Outright lie. Liar. Fine. Finally you say, dammit, just go there and do it. Put it there, let's go, here's the money, let's go. Let's just get one person treated. I can't sleep another night.

In an appearance on CNN's Larry King Live, Cruise said that he founded the project out of concern that 9/11 survivors would suffer leukemia, Parkinsonism, multiple sclerosis or cancer as a result of toxins lodged in their fatty tissue. He advocated Hubbard's purification program as the only way to deal with these problems, claiming, "Doctors do not know how to diagnose chemical exposures ... You go to a doctor and now he's going to put you on more and more drugs, steroids and things that are ineffective."

=== Detoxification in Scientology ===
The principles of the detoxification program were described in the Scientology book Clear Body, Clear Mind. Known as the "Purification rundown" or "Purif", the program is promoted through various groups affiliated with the Church of Scientology, including the Narconon and Second Chance programs. It claims to flush poisons from the body's fat stores using exercise, saunas, and the consumption of oil and high doses of vitamins, particularly niacin. Medical professionals have judged the method to be unproven, ineffective and/or potentially dangerous. A report for the Department of Health in California described the mega-doses of vitamins as "hazardous" and "in some cases lethal." Scientology's own literature reports dehydration, electrolyte disturbances including hyponatremia (low sodium level) and hypokalemia (low potassium level), and heat-related illnesses as being frequent side-effects of the program. Testimonials from some participants credit it with improvements in physical and mental health, but several families blame the program for the death of a relative and several lawsuits have been filed against Scientology.

The project's clients were required to attend this programme three hours each day, for between twenty-one and forty days. This was promoted as a way to treat memory loss, respiratory problems, fatigue and other problems suffered by the Ground Zero workers.

== Finances and organization ==
From 2003 to 2007, Downtown Medical received US$900,000 in public funding, including $630,000 from the City of New York. The project also received private funding, the biggest supporter being Tom Cruise. Other celebrity donors included Paul Newman, Paul McCartney, Adam Sandler, Leah Remini, Will Smith and Jada Pinkett Smith. By late 2004, these donations amounted to $2.3 million. The detoxification program has been offered for free to rescue workers, and also offered to other New York City residents, some of whom paid $5,000.

According to tax filings, the project pays some of its money to two bodies that promote the Purification Rundown, both related to the Church of Scientology. These are the Association for Better Living and Education (ABLE), which receives 5% of all contributions, and the Foundation for Advancements in Science and Education (FASE). In 1981, Bill Franks, then Executive Director of the Church of Scientology, was involved in creating FASE; he later described it as a front group. In one year, $173,300 of Downtown Medical's income went to Dr. Steven Lager, a Scientologist. As of 2007, the director of the project was Jim Woodworth, a former drug addict who credits his recovery to the Purification Rundown. He was formerly the executive director of HealthMed, a Sacramento, California, group which promotes Hubbard's approach to detoxification.

== Endorsements and criticism ==
The project had a mixed response from public officials. Margarita López, a former member of the New York City Council, endorsed the program and helped it to win public funding. Subsequently, she received nearly $115,000 in campaign contributions from Scientologists. Another councillor, Joseph Addabbo Jr., also supported the project, telling reporters, "The project seems to work. I've seen it firsthand." Mayor Michael Bloomberg spoke out against Addabbo and López for their connections with the program, saying that Scientology is "not science, and we should only fund those programs that reputable scientists believe will stand the light of day".

Another supportive member of the City Council was Hiram Monserrate. Monserrate went through the program himself, and drafted official proclamations honoring both Tom Cruise and L. Ron Hubbard. Describing himself as a Christian, he distanced himself from Scientology but said he believes in the Purification Rundown. Another councillor (and chair of the Public Safety Committee), Peter Vallone Jr., vocally criticized the detoxification project and argued that public money should not be spent on it. He accused Monserrate of crossing the line between "cult and state".

The project's publicity included favorable quotations from U.S. Senator Chuck Schumer and from Michael Balboni, New York's deputy secretary for Public Security, though Schumer later withdrew his support and Balboni denied ever making the statement. Council speaker Christine C. Quinn denounced the program as meritless. U.S. Representative Carolyn B. Maloney wrote a letter supporting the project. Dr. Bob Hoffman of the New York City Poison Control Center warned that the Purification Rundown is potentially dangerous, calling it "hocus pocus". Mayor Doreen Ehrbar of Williston Park took part in the opening ceremony for the Long Island clinic.

Neither the New York City Police Department nor New York City Fire Department officially supported the project. The Uniformed Firefighters Association initially supported it, but withdrew when the connection to the Church of Scientology was revealed. Firefighter Union President Patrick Bahnken said his members' lives had benefited from the program, and that it had involved no religious rhetoric. Deputy Fire Commissioner Frank Gribbon of the FDNY told The New York Times, "while we are aware some members of the department have availed themselves of the program, we in no way endorse it.” Officials at the department raised concerns that firefighters were giving up existing medications in order to take part. The department's deputy chief medical officer Dr. David Prezant said, "It's not our job to say you can't go. All we can do is say there's no proven evidence it works."

Actress and radio show host Janeane Garofalo drew criticism by allowing actress Leah Remini, then a Scientologist, to promote the project on her Air America Radio show.

== Outcomes ==
It was reported in October 2007 that 838 people had completed the program. The clinic displayed towels with colored stains, as evidence that toxic material had been sweated out in the saunas. According to its director, Jim Woodworth, during the Purification Rundown firefighters had passed odd-colored bowel movements and sweated out mercury, aluminium and magnesium. The Fire Department's chief medical officer, Dr. Kerry Kelly, criticized the lack of objective evidence, saying, "I have trouble believing in these purple-stained towels."

An investigation by the New York Press asked a number of independent doctors about the evidence for the Purification Rundown. None of them endorsed the program's effectiveness and some explicitly described it as dangerous. Several said that no peer-reviewed research on the rundown had been published in any medical journal. Some apparently supportive studies have been published, but these lack control groups and have other scientific failings. According to Deputy Fire Commissioner Frank Gribbon, doctors investigating the program on behalf of the Fire Department concluded that it was not detoxifying. University of Georgia bioterrorism expert Cham Dallas also denied that the procedure could detoxify, saying "It sounds great and they mean well, but it just doesn't work."

In 2007, James Dahlgren and colleagues published a small-sample pilot study assessing the project. Dahlgren is a doctor who promotes the Purification Rundown as a method of detoxification. The study claimed to find evidence both of elevated levels of polychlorinated biphenyls (PCBs) and polychlorinated dibenzofurans (PCDFs) in the rescue workers and improvement during the program. Two scientists from Cambridge Environmental, Inc. published a thorough critique of the study. They questioned the premise that World Trade Center rescue workers needed detoxification, citing studies that had found that their blood concentration of toxins was no greater than normal.

[W]ith few exceptions, people's body burdens of PCBs and other 'dioxin-like compounds' are determined almost exclusively by the food we eat, not by the air we breathe. Firefighters may occasionally receive on-the-job exposures to PCBs and PCDFs, but these would be from having fought PCB-containing electrical transformer fires, not from 9/11.

The paper argues that the project never properly tested its outcomes and concludes that application of the "potentially dangerous" Purification Rundown to the health problems of 9/11 workers is "unconscionable".

Many of the participants spoke favorably of the program and reported improved physical and mental health. Others said they were just taking advantage of the free saunas. One Fire Department lieutenant was quoted describing colleagues as desperate for help with the distress they felt in the aftermath of the attacks, to the point that they would try anything. Fire Department officials raised concerns about the project, saying that firefighters were being required to give up inhalers, pills and other orthodox medication. Two weeks into the program, one firefighter passed out and was taken to an emergency room with severe asthma, later saying that he had been asked to stop using his inhaler. According to the clinic's associate medical director, Dr. Kawabena Nyamekye, participants were being helped off medication at their own insistence, not at the request of Downtown Medical. A former worker at Downtown Medical told reporters that staff were discouraged from calling for an ambulance even in an emergency, and that one of them had been required to break off contact with her boyfriend because he had left Scientology. A spokesman responded that the clinic had "a clear policy of calling 911 when needed."

== See also ==
- Purification Rundown
- Narconon
- Clear Body, Clear Mind
- All About Radiation
- Dianazene
