= Purify =

Purify is a surname. Notable people with the name include:

- Maurice Purify (born 1986), American football wide receiver
- James & Bobby Purify, American soul music vocal duo

Purify may also refer to:

- Purify (album), a mini album released by the Canadian death metal band Axis of Advance
- Purify (Funk Trek album), an album by funk/jazz fusion band Funk Trek
- "Purify", a song by Metallica on the album St. Anger
- "Purify", a song by Neurosis on the album Through Silver in Blood
- "Purify", a song by Lacuna Coil on the album Unleashed Memories
- IBM Rational Purify, in computing, debugger software
- Purification (disambiguation), the act or process of purifying

== See also ==
- Purified (disambiguation)
- Putrify
- Purefoy
- Purifoy
