= Purification Rundown =

Scientology pseudoscientific detoxification program

- Type: Detoxification program in Scientology
- Description: A regimen of daily brief running, extended sauna sessions, and high-dose vitamins alleged to remove toxins and residual drugs from the body
- Role: To prepare individuals for auditing and improve spiritual and physical well-being
- Associated controversies: Medical safety concerns, high vitamin dosages, lack of scientific support

The Purification Rundown, also known as the Purif or the Hubbard Method, is a pseudoscientific procedure that advocates of Scientology claim is a detoxification program. There is no evidence for its efficacy in detoxification, and significant evidence from clinicians that it is dangerous. It involves heat exposure for up to 5 hours a day and can exceed 4 weeks in length. It can potentially cause heatstroke damage, which includes brain injury, heart problems, organ failure, and death. It was developed by Scientology's founder L. Ron Hubbard and used by the Church of Scientology as an introductory service. Numerous individuals have been hospitalised as a result of taking part in the process.

It has no known clinical use in treating drug addiction, but followers of Scientology believe it to be the only effective way to deal with the long-term effects of drug abuse or toxic exposure. It forms the basis for programs operated by groups affiliated with the Scientology organization, widely considered to be recruitment fronts, such as Narconon, Criminon, Second Chance, and the International Academy of Detoxification Specialists. The Scientology organization markets these as drug rehabilitation and detoxification programs. The program combines exercise, dietary supplements and long stays in a sauna (up to five hours a day for five weeks). It is promoted variously as religious or secular, medical or purely spiritual, depending on context. Hubbard put forward his ideas about niacin in a book called All About Radiation. He claimed to have discovered that large doses of vitamins could both alleviate and prevent radiation sickness. He marketed this anti-radiation mixture in the form of a tablet, calling it "Dianazene". Twenty-one thousand such tablets were seized and destroyed by the U.S. Food and Drug Administration in 1958.

The 1979 predecessor of the Purification Rundown was known as the "Sweat Program" and was similarly designed to remove traces of LSD which, according to Hubbard, remained for long periods in the body. The participant had a restricted diet, including large doses of vitamins and a teaspoon of salt, and spent at least an hour a day jogging in a rubberised suit. For some, this regimen lasted for months.

The program was developed for use in Narconon, and was published in Hubbard's Technical Bulletins of Dianetics and Scientology as well as the book Clear Body, Clear Mind. Two other books describe the procedure, Purification: An Illustrated Answer to Drugs and Narconon New Life Detoxification Program: the effective purification program by L. Ron Hubbard. The term "Purification Rundown" is a trademark of the Religious Technology Center (the governing body of the Church of Scientology), though an RTC spokesman has denied any licensing arrangement with Narconon.

== Process ==
The Purification Rundown usually takes several weeks. As well as spending time in saunas, people are required to do light exercise including calisthenics, treadmills, and other similar activities.

The program consists of a course of doses of vitamins (niacin in particular), long periods in a sauna, exercise, and consumption of a blend of vegetable oils, in the belief that the subject will sweat out the toxins and replace the oils in the body's fatty tissues with the vegetable oil. Clear Body, Clear Mind recommends that participants maintain their normal diet throughout the procedure, supplemented with fresh vegetables.

The program requires its participants to ingest the following at regular intervals:

- A multi-vitamin cocktail, the main ingredient of which is niacin. Clear Body, Clear Mind recommends initial doses of 100 mg, increasing to 5,000 mg over the course of the program. This contrasts with the medically recommended level of about 15 mg: larger doses can have severe, even potentially fatal side effects. The participant is told to expect toxic symptoms due to the release of poisons or radiation from their body fat. Thus the effects of niacin overdose, which include skin irritation, flushing, dizziness and headache, are interpreted as a positive effect of the program.
- Mineral supplements, including calcium, magnesium, iron, zinc, manganese, copper, iodine and potassium.
- Up to half a cupful of pure oils per day.
- "CalMag", a drink which Clear Body, Clear Mind describes as a solution of calcium gluconate, magnesium carbonate and vinegar in water, in such proportions that the mix has twice as much elemental calcium as magnesium. This is taken up to three times per day.
- Enough liquids to replace the fluids lost in the sauna.

Hubbard specified that each participant must complete a daily report form, listing the amounts of vitamins, minerals, Cal-Mag and other fluids taken, which is reviewed to make sure they are complying with every aspect of the program.

The cost of the program was reported as about US$2,000 in 1990 $1,790 "with discounts" in 1996 (though another 1996 source claims around $4,000 for a four-week programme), $1,200 in 1998 and $5,200 in 2009.

Clear Body, Clear Mind contains a disclaimer which states that the program is not a medical treatment. A similar disclaimer appears in the Hubbard Communication Office Bulletins, noting that the treatment is not a medical process but a purely spiritual activity. Hubbard recommends that the participant should sign a waiver noting that the program is not medical treatment.

== Promotion ==
The Purification Rundown is promoted as having physical and mental benefits such as lowering cholesterol, relieving pain, and improving memory. Scientology's promotional materials claim it can boost IQ by up to 15 points. Scientologists are strongly encouraged to take part in the program as a necessary step in their spiritual progress. Scientology promotes the Purification Rundown to the public as a detoxification program, while it also works with non-religious Scientology-affiliated groups such as Narconon to offer this program as a treatment for addiction and high levels of stress. Conditions that are claimed by Scientologists to respond to the program include cancer, AIDS, heart problems, kidney failure, liver disease and obesity.

In a January 1980 announcement, Hubbard told his followers that a nuclear war was an imminent threat and that the program would enable them to deal with heavy nuclear fallout. He warned that those who completed the program would stand better chances of survival.

The Church of Scientology unsuccessfully tried to have the Nobel Peace Prize awarded to Hubbard for his invention of the program.

In California, two organizations were set up by Scientologists to try to give scientific legitimacy to the detoxification program—Foundation for Advancements in Science and Education (FASE) and HealthMed Clinic. Bill Franks, prior Executive Director International of the Church of Scientology, said he was involved in creating FASE and later described it as one of Scientology's front groups. FASE funded research and published articles by Scientologists hailing the effectiveness of Hubbard's procedures. HealthMed, an ostensibly independent organization, used this material to promote Hubbard's detoxification methods to public agencies all over the state. Both bodies were strongly criticized by a group of physicians from the California Department of Health Services.

The program, as delivered by HealthMed, is heavily promoted in the book Diet for a Poisoned Planet by journalist David Steinman, who denies any connection with the Church of Scientology. The book was the subject of a paper from the U.S. Food and Drug Administration which accused Steinman of distorting facts. C. Everett Koop, the former Surgeon General of the United States, also criticized the book, recommending that the public stay away from Hubbard's "detoxification" procedure.

== Reception ==
=== Theoretical basis ===
The theory behind the Purification Rundown is that toxins, drugs, and radioactive particles are stored in body fat, which are released through the exchange of fats (thus the oil consumption) and exercise, and then finally released via perspiration and other normal mechanisms such as body waste. Independent scientific evaluations report that the concentration of toxins or drugs in the sweat is negligible, as they are primarily removed from the body through the liver, the kidneys and the lungs. The notion that toxins from fatty tissue can be sweated out is categorically denied by toxicology experts. Evidence offered has not demonstrated that detoxification is actually taking place.

A 1995 review at a medical conference described the massive doses of niacin as inappropriate, especially since they cause the release of histamine, which is counterproductive when dealing with chemical sensitivity. Psychologist Herman Staudenmayer describes the program as part of a trend for diagnosing and treating a Multiple Chemical Sensitivity disorder which does not correspond to any known disease and is likely to be psychophysiological. He adds, "The position statements of medical societies [...] are unambiguous about the lack of scientific evidence for these practices."

In January 2005, a group of five doctors and nine health education experts acting on behalf of the California Department of Education issued a report examining Narconon and its materials. The report described the key assumptions of the program as unscientific and inaccurate. Three experts consulted by The Buffalo News criticised the weak evidence and dubious assumptions behind the program.

David Emerson Root, a medical doctor affiliated with Narconon, has administered the program for twenty years and stands by the theory behind it. A non-Scientologist, he denies that the program collects money or new members for Scientology.

=== Effectiveness and safety ===
An investigation by the New York Press asked a number of independent doctors about the evidence for the Purification Rundown. None of them endorsed the program's effectiveness and some explicitly described it as dangerous. Several said that no peer-reviewed research on the program had been published in any medical journal. Some apparently supportive studies have been published, but these lack control groups and have other scientific failings.

Newkirk Herald Journal editor Robert W. Lobsinger solicited a number of medical experts' opinions on the program in 1989. James Kenney of the National Council Against Health Fraud condemned those administering the "unproven" treatment as guilty of health fraud. He wrote that "[...] the scientific evidence shows the exact opposite of what Hubbard's theory predicts", warning that large doses of niacin could cause liver damage, gout, gastritis, and other serious side-effects. Dr. David Hogg of Toronto said that the program may be detrimental to participants' health. Dr. C. Mark Palmer of Ponca City, Oklahoma rebutted the theory that sweating would clear out drugs, stating that "No matter how much a patient were made to sweat, it could not significantly increase his clearing of most drugs."

After reviewing materials published by Narconon, University of Oklahoma biochemistry professor Bruce Roe described the program as "a scam" based on "half-truths and pseudo-science." In a 1988 report, Dr. Ronald E. Gots, a toxicology expert from Bethesda, Maryland, called the regimen "quackery", and noted that "no recognized body of toxicologists, no department of occupational medicine, nor any governmental agencies endorse or recommend such treatment." In 1991, the Board of Mental Health in Oklahoma refused to certify the program for use in a Narconon facility on the grounds of potential danger from its high vitamin and mineral doses. A report on Narconon for the Department of Health in California described the mega-doses of vitamins as "hazardous" and "in some cases lethal". Prof. Michael Ryan, a pharmacologist at University College Dublin, testified in a 2003 court case that the program is scientifically unverified and medically unsafe.

Those who market the program insist that it has been proven safe and effective. The marketing materials present testimonials for its effectiveness. Some doctors who have observed the treatment have been impressed by the testimonials but asked for evidence that improvements are caused by the program itself rather than suggestion, delusion or the placebo effect. In 2007, psychopharmacology expert John Brick said of his visit to a Manhattan clinic, "Whether it's from some mysterious combination of vitamins or just good diet and exercise, I can't say. But the bottom line is that it helped the patients I talked to." He emphasized the importance of independently verifying the validity of the program, conceding that no causal relationship between the results and the program had been demonstrated.

In a 1999 French court case, five staff members of the Church of Scientology were convicted of fraud for selling the program and other Scientology procedures. In Russia, the program has been banned by officials as a threat to public health.

== Adverse outcomes ==
Paride Ella and Giuseppe Tomba, clients of Narconon in Taceno, Italy, died in 1995 during the vitamin phase of the program, suffering kidney problems and a heart attack respectively.

In 1996, journalist Mark Ebner described the case of a woman who had suffered heatstroke and anemia while on the program.

One day, she was found blue-lipped on the waiting room floor, hemorrhaging. Instead of taking her blood pressure or calling an ambulance or even a doctor, they explained away her bleeding as "restimulation" from radiation she had absorbed from ultrasound testing she'd had years before.

In 1997, two emergency room doctors reported treating a 45-year-old man who had participated in the Purification Rundown. Previously healthy, he had developed tremors while on the program, for which the Church of Scientology recommended further Purification as treatment. Put back in the sauna, he developed seizures and was taken to hospital in an incoherent state. He was diagnosed with severe hyponatremia and required three days of medical treatment. In a similar case, a woman from Medina, Ohio required hospitalization after losing sleep and developing hallucinations during the program. In 2004, a former participant in the UK told reporters that the program had gravely worsened his physical condition, and that he had been denied medical treatment.

A 25-year-old man in Portland, Oregon died from liver failure after having participated in the Purification Rundown. His parents sued the Church of Scientology and the case was settled out of court. Scientology officials blamed the death on prior medical problems.

== Adoption by public bodies ==
The City Council of Shreveport, Louisiana approved 20 firefighters to take the program via HealthMed in the late 1980s. The city's insurers commissioned an evaluation from toxicologist Ronald E. Gots, who dismissed the program as "quackery", saying it "served no rational medical function." As a consequence, Shreveport ended its support.

In 1994, the London Borough of Tower Hamlets covered costs for an alcoholic to go to Narconon for detoxification, but the council withdrew funding when the Church of Scientology connection was revealed. The woman stayed on, funded by Narconon's trustees.

=== Second Chance ===
"Second Chance" is a program administering the Purification Rundown to substance abuse offenders. Its first center was set up in Ensenada in 1995 with a mix of state and private funding. In October 2001, two officials from Erie County Holding Center in Buffalo, New York visited the Mexican center at a Scientology patron's expense. They were impressed enough to appeal for $700,000 to introduce Second Chance to their own prison, although lack of funds put the project on hold.

In September 2006 a Second Chance project was set up in Albuquerque, New Mexico. This center took in hundreds of referrals in its first year but ran into financial trouble. Some judges, unconvinced of its effectiveness, refused to refer offenders. In October 2008, Curry County commissioners ended their contract with the project, after an independent study revealed the center had inflated its success rates. In the two years prior, the center had received $1.57 million in federal and state funding. In December 2008, the center was forced to close down after Mayor Martin Chavez accused it of "misrepresentation and deceit".

=== New York Rescue Workers Detoxification Project ===
The New York Rescue Workers Detoxification Project is an initiative in New York City, co-founded by celebrity Scientologist Tom Cruise, which provides Purification Rundowns for public-sector employees who were exposed to toxins in the aftermath of the September 11, 2001 attacks. Its president claimed to have administered the program to over 800 rescue workers. Many participants have claimed positive results, and some local government figures have supported the project, which was awarded public funding. However, it has drawn criticism for exposing rescue workers to the potential dangers of the program, for encouraging them to give up conventional medical treatments, for recruiting into Scientology and for channeling funding to Scientology-related bodies.

=== Utah Meth Cops Project ===
Inspired by the New York project, a center in Orem, Utah administers the Purification Rundown to Salt Lake City police who complain of health effects from exposure to meth lab toxins. The process is administered under the name of Bio-Cleansing Centers of America and has received public money in addition to private donations. Many police who have taken part claim to have benefited, though a medical doctor associated with the Utah clinic acknowledged in 2007 that there were no studies of the program's effect on people who had been exposed to meth labs.

The major supporter of the clinic has been State Attorney General Mark Shurtleff. In 2007 and 2008, his office spent $140,000 to pay for 20 police to take the program, and requested a total of $440,000 from the Utah State Legislature. The legislature advanced $240,000 of this further funding. In 2009, Republicans in the State Legislature approved an additional $100,000 for the project in the closing days of a session, bypassing a committee which would have reviewed the payment.

== Other endorsements ==
Scientologist actress Kelly Preston endorsed the program and credited it for helping the health of her son Jett.

In a 1998 interview, Heber Jentzsch, president of the Church of Scientology International, credited the program with curing radiation sickness that he allegedly suffered as a result of childhood exposure to nuclear testing in Utah. No cases of radiation sickness have ever been reported in Utah, due to the low level of fallout involved, although some cases of leukemia may have been associated with the tests.

== See also ==
- Scientology beliefs and practices
- Narconon
