= David Emerson Root =

Chief Flight Surgeon, US Air Force and Senior Pilot

David E. Root
- Born: March 1936 (age 90); Salt Lake City, Utah, U.S.
- Known for: Detoxification,
- Medical career
- Sub-specialties: Occupational and Environmental Medicine
- Website: getdetoxinated.com; somg.net

David Emerson Root (born March, 1936) is a United States Air Force physician known for promoting Niacin Protocol Sauna Detoxification to treat chemical exposure.

== Professional life ==
Root received his medical degree from Wake Forest University School of Medicine, Bowman Gray Campus, Winston-Salem, NC, in 1962. He served 20 years in the United States Air Force before retiring in 1980 with the rank of Colonel as Chief Flight Surgeon and Senior Pilot.

In 1982 Root began implementing the Niacin Sauna detoxification method, based loosely on a protocol created L. Ron Hubbard, from his Sacramento, California, practice in a joint venture with the HealthMed Clinic, run by two environmental medicine doctors and an organization named "Foundation for Advancements in Science and Education" (FASE). Root is listed as the medical director of HealthMed and the Senior Medical Advisor of FASE.

He was the Senior Medical Advisor to the "International Academy of Detoxification Specialists", a subsidiary of New York Rescue Workers Detoxification Project. The program was supported by NYC Council member, Margarita Lopez(also a patient), Senator Charles Schumer, Congresswoman Carolyn Maloney, Congressman Vito Fossella and former Congressman and Vice Presidential Candidate, Jack Kemp. It received three rounds of public funding.

== Criticism ==
Scientists independent of Scientology describe the Hubbard Method as quackery, unproven and medically unsafe. The Scientology operated Narconon drug rehabilitation centers, for which Root is a member of the Science Advisory Board, has garnered considerable controversy as a result of its origins in Scientology and its methods. After reviewing materials published by Narconon, University of Oklahoma biochemistry professor Bruce Roe described the program as "a scam" based on "half-truths and pseudo-science."

== Other activities ==
In a 1987 California Workers' Compensation Appeals Board award, Root's testimony helped annul a 1986 denial of insurance on a claimed injury to the petitioner's skin, gastrointestinal tract, and other organs from cumulative exposure to polychlorinated biphenyls (PCBs) in the course of his employment. The petitioner recovered his detoxification costs, and this ruling paved the way for other workers' compensation cases involving Multiple Chemical Sensitivity, a controversial diagnosis which is not generally accepted by medical science.

Claimed positive subjective results from the New York Rescue Workers Detoxification Project convinced Utah State Attorney General Mark Shurtleff to fund the Utah Meth Cops Project with over $440,000 in taxpayer dollars to treat police who complain of health effects from exposure to meth lab toxins.

== Published works ==
- David, E. Root; Gerald, T. Lionelli (January 1, 1987). "Excretion of a lipophilic toxicant through the sebaceous glands: a case report". Journal of Toxicology: Cutaneous and Ocular Toxicology. 6 (1): 13–17. doi:10.3109/15569528709052160. ISSN 0731-3829.
- Root, D.; Anderson, Joan (April 1986). "Reducing Toxic Body Burdens Advancing an Innovative Technique". Occupational Health and Safety. 11 (4).

== Research studies funded ==
=== Gulf War syndrome ===
In an effort to validate their subjective detoxification results while providing relief to the American vets suffering from Gulf War Syndrome, FASE set out to secure funding for a comprehensive research study through the Congressionally Directed Medical Research Programs (CDMRP). Root's testimony in 1998 to the Presidential Special Oversight Board For Department of Defense Investigations of Gulf War Chemical & Biological Incidents, and to the Centers for Disease Control (CDC), led to an official recommendation by CDC that detoxification be studied as a treatment option for Gulf War veterans. The $633,677.00 grant, titled "Gulf War Illness: Evaluation of an Innovative Detoxification Program" was awarded in September, 2010.

=== Utah Meth Cops project ===
In 2012, a peer-reviewed report of the findings from the Utah Meth Cops Project study was published on PubMed.Gov of the US National Library of Medicine for the National Institute of Health.

The report concludes, "This investigation strongly suggests that utilizing sauna and nutritional therapy may alleviate chronic symptoms appearing after chemical exposures associated with methamphetamine-related law enforcement activities. This report also has relevance to addressing the apparent ill effects of other complex chemical exposures. In view of the positive clinical outcomes in this group, broader investigation of this sauna-based treatment regimen appears warranted."
