= David Steinman =

American environmentalist

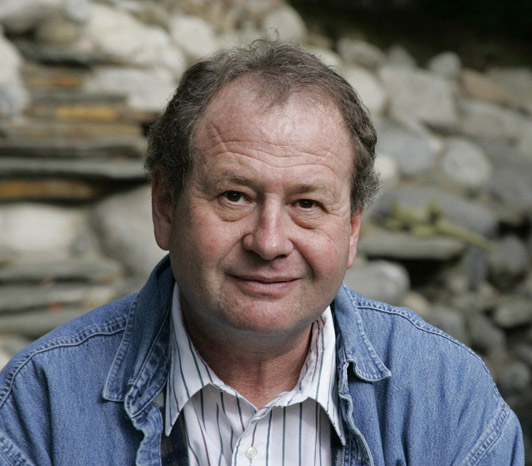
- David Steinman in 2006.
- Education: Columbia University; University of Oregon
- Occupations: Journalist, Environmentalist, Author
- Notable work: Diet for a Poisoned Planet

David Steinman is an environmentalist, journalist, consumer health advocate, publisher and author. He has published five books focusing largely on environmental, dietary, and consumer safety issues, including Diet for a Poisoned Planet in 1990. He is the founder of the publishing company, Freedom Press, which publishes Healthy Living Magazine, and he also operated an online radio show entitled, Green Patriot Radio.

== Education ==
Steinman earned his undergraduate degree from Columbia University before earning a Master's degree in journalism from the University of Oregon.

== Career ==
In 1985 while writing for LA Weekly, David Steinman learned that fish in the Santa Monica Bay were tainted with DDT and PCBs. He organized a research team from Loma Linda University that found levels of DDT and PCBs were elevated in the blood of local sport fishermen (including himself). He wrote an article about his findings for the Weekly entitled "Poisoned Fish, Poisoned Fishermen".

In February 1986, Steinman was invited to testify as an expert witness before the Congressional Subcommittee on Health and the Environment chaired by Henry Waxman. He shared his findings about the environmental contamination of fishers from Santa Monica Bay and the levels of contamination in locally-sold seafood. The findings of his research team from Loma Linda University were also published in Environmental Toxicology and Chemistry in 1989.

In 1990, he published his first book, Diet for a Poisoned Planet, which discussed, among other things, how to avoid foods that may have been contaminated with pesticides and what pesticides could do to human bodies. Soon after its release, the book garnered criticism from industry organizations like the California Raisin Advisory Board and the American Council on Science and Health (ACSH) for its "alarmist" views. The California Raisin Advisory Board spent $558,000 on a campaign to denounce findings in the book. ACSH founder, Elizabeth Whelan, termed the book a "threat to national security." Steinman himself said that he believed the industry was "conspiring against" him to discredit his research. The book promoted Scientology's HealthMed program extensively.

In 1995, Steinman co-authored The Safe Shopper's Bible with Samuel Epstein. The book provided information on which foods, cosmetics, toiletries, and other household products did or did not have carcinogens or other toxins.

In 2007, Steinman commissioned a study on shampoos and bath products that showed that some were contaminated with the carcinogenic compound, 1,4-dioxane. He commissioned a second study in 2008 that revealed that 47 out of 100 soaps, shampoos and other consumer products labeled "natural" or "organic" had detectable levels of the compound. By that time, Steinman had begun publishing Healthy Living Magazine via his publishing company, Freedom Press.

In 2010, Steinman created the online radio show, Green Patriot Radio, which he also hosted. Steinman ran for the U.S. House of Representatives in California's 33rd congressional district in 2012 as a Green Party candidate, running against incumbent Democratic candidate Henry A. Waxman and others. Steinman lost in the June 2012 nonpartisan blanket primary, coming in sixth place with 3.5% of the vote.

=== Bibliography ===
Publication year	Title	Original publisher	ISBN	Notes
1990	Diet for a Poisoned Planet	Harmony Books	ISBN 1-56025-922-1	Seattle Times Bestseller.
1995	The Safe Shopper's Bible	Macmillan	ISBN 0-02-082085-2	Co-written with Samuel Epstein
1996	Living Healthy in a Toxic World	Perigee Trade	ISBN 0-399-52206-9	Co-written with Michael Wisner
1998	The Breast Cancer Prevention Program	Macmillan	ISBN 0-02-862634-6	Co-written with Samuel Epstein
2007	Safe Trip to Eden	Running Press	ISBN 1-56025-806-3	
