= CBCM =

CBCM may refer to:

- CBCM-FM, the rebroadcaster of the radio station CBLA-FM in Penetanguishene, Ontario, Canada
- Clear Body, Clear Mind, a book published by the Church of Scientology
