= Purification =

Purification is the process of rendering something pure, i.e. clean of foreign elements and/or pollution, and may refer to:

== Religion ==
- Ritual purification, the religious activity to remove uncleanliness
- Purification after death
- Purification of the Virgin, a Christian liturgical feast
- Purification Rundown, in Scientology

== Other uses ==
- Purification (album), a 2002 Crimson Thorn album
- Quantum state purification in quantum mechanics, especially quantum information
- Purification theorem in game theory and economics, a Nash equilibrium consisting of randomly mixed strategies
- Water purification
  - Organisms used in water purification
- List of purification methods in chemistry

== See also ==
- Purificación (disambiguation)
- Purify (disambiguation)
- Purified (disambiguation)
