= Purified =

Purified may refer to:

- Purified (rapper), Christian hip hop electrohop artist from South Africa, now in Sydney, Australia
- Purified (album), 2005 gospel album by CeCe Winans
- "Purified", song by Celldweller from the album Blackstar
- "Purified", song by Michael W. Smith from the album Worship
- "Purified", song by Of Mice & Men from the album The Flood

== See also ==
- Purified National Party, a break away from South African National Party which lasted from 1935 to 1948
- Purify (disambiguation)
- Purification (disambiguation)
