= Purificación =

Purificación may refer to:

== Places ==
- Purificación, Tolima, a town and municipality in the Tolima department of Colombia
- Purificación River (Jalisco), a river in Jalisco, Mexico
- Purificación River (Tamaulipas), a river in Tamaulipas, Mexico
- Villa Purificación, a town and municipality in Jalisco, Mexico
- Camp Purificación, headquarters of the Federal League (1815–1820) on the eastern bank of the Uruguay River

== People ==
- Purificación Ortiz (born 1972), Spanish paralympic athlete
- Purificación "Purita" Campos (1937–2019), Spanish illustrator
- Purificación Carpinteyro Calderón (born 1961), Mexican politician and lawyer
- Purificación Angue Ondo, diplomat from Equatorial Guinea
- Purificacion Santamarta, Spanish paralympic athlete
- Purificación Zelaya (1866–1940), Honduran military officer, landlord and politician

== See also ==
- Purification (disambiguation)
