= Dianazene =

Vitamin compound in Scientology

Dianazene was the name given by L. Ron Hubbard to a vitamin compound containing iron, vitamin C, and various B vitamins, including especially large doses of niacin.

Hubbard promoted it as a form of protection against radiation poisoning during the 1950s, saying that "Dianazene runs out radiation — or what appears to be radiation. It also proofs a person against radiation in some degree. It also turns on and runs out incipient cancer."

In 1958, the Food and Drug Administration seized and destroyed 21,000 Dianazene tablets from the Distribution Center Inc., a company with ties to the Church of Scientology, because they were falsely labeled as a preventative and treatment for radiation sickness.

Vitamins continue to play a large role in the Scientology Purification Rundown and (the secular version) in the Narconon program, where it is similarly claimed that large quantities of niacin and other vitamins, combined with the heat in a sauna, can "purify" the body by allowing it to release toxins stored in cellular tissue and to "run out" or ameliorate prior radiation exposure including sunburn.

== Ingredients ==
A standard dose of Dianazene, according to Hubbard's 1957 book All About Radiation, contained the following ingredients:

- Vitamin B_{3} (Niacin): 200 mg
- Iron (Ferrous gluconate): 10 grains (600 mg)
- Vitamin B_{1} (Thiamine): 25 mg
- Vitamin B_{2} (Riboflavin): 50 mg
- Vitamin C (Ascorbic acid): 200–500 mg
- Calcium (Dicalcium phosphate): 15-20 grains (1000–1300 mg)
