= Clear Body, Clear Mind =

Scientology book, Purification Rundown

- Cover of first edition
- Author: L. Ron Hubbard
- Language: English
- Subject: Purification Rundown
- Publisher: Bridge Publications
- Publication date: 1990
- Publication place: United States
- Media type: Print
- Pages: 306
- ISBN: 0-88404-549-8
- OCLC: 22113510
- Dewey Decimal: 613 20
- LC Class: RC564 .H828 1990
- Website: clearbodyclearmind.com

Clear Body, Clear Mind is a pseudoscientific book about Scientology compiled from L. Ron Hubbard material from the 1960s. It was published posthumously in 1990 by Bridge Publications, the Church of Scientology's publishing house. The book is considered part of Scientology's canon. It is the textbook for the Purification Rundown ("Purif"), which Scientologists believe is a detoxification program with medical and spiritual benefits. Medical professionals characterise it as dangerous, quackery, and in some cases lethal.

== Purification Rundown ==
The Purif consists of a "combination of exercise, vitamins, nutrition and sauna use," which purportedly "dislodges drug residues and other toxins from the fatty tissues so that these substances can then be eliminated from the body." Scientologists are expected to take the Purif as part of their spiritual progress, and it is also promoted in secular contexts via Scientology-related groups including Narconon, Criminon and Second Chance. It is promoted as a cure for conditions including cancer, AIDS, heart problems, kidney failure, liver disease and obesity. The procedure is viewed as dangerous by many medical professionals, as it calls for saunas and vitamins far in excess of safe levels. Side effects listed by Scientology include dehydration, electrolyte disturbances including hyponatremia (low sodium level), hypokalemia (low potassium level), and heat-related illnesses. Some families have sued the Church of Scientology, claiming that the Purif was responsible for the death of a relative.

== Medical claims ==
Clear Body, Clear Mind includes a disclaimer to the effect that the Purification Rundown is not a medical treatment and that it should not be read as making medical claims. However, in their Introduction to the book, David Root M.D. and James Barnes write:

L. Ron Hubbard's Purification program remains the only proven and safe method for reducing or eliminating chemical residues from the body. It has been used to alleviate the symptoms and concerns of people exposed to radiation. With each year, the importance of this discovery to every man, woman and child on this planet becomes more evident.

Hubbard claims to have been the discoverer of the "acid flashback" phenomenon, in which LSD is said to lodge itself in tissues and re-enter the bloodstream years later. He claims to have made this discovery "In the 1970s, working with cases of individuals who had been drug users". (pg. 23, 1990 hardcover edition)

Scientology's official website says of the book:

"Pesticides, solar radiation, drug and environmental toxins have become increasingly pervasive in today's society. They damage not just your health, but your personality and your ability to think clearly. Clear Body, Clear Mind -'The Effective Purification Program', by L. Ron Hubbard, details his groundbreaking discoveries in this field. Discover the world's only all-natural, proven program to eliminate drug and toxic residues lodged in the fatty tissues of your body. Over 250,000 have done this program with spectacular success."

The claim of "Over 250,000" successes drew censure from the UK's Advertising Standards Authority. The figure was a count of everyone who had completed the program, including people whose "drug" exposure was infrequent use of alcoholic drinks or prescription drugs.

A 1995 review of the book at a medical conference described the mega-doses of niacin as inappropriate, especially since they cause the release of histamine, which is counterproductive when dealing with chemical sensitivity.

== Related books ==
In All About Radiation, Hubbard (1957) sets out his idiosyncratic theories of radiation, including the idea that large doses of vitamins could both alleviate and prevent radiation sickness.

Purification: An Illustrated Answer To Drugs (New Era Publications, 1984. ISBN 87-7336-350-2) is an earlier, illustrated explanation of the Purification Rundown. Another illustrated book, Narconon New Life Detoxification Program: the effective purification program by L. Ron Hubbard. (Bridge Publications, 1991. ISBN 0-88404-658-3) is listed as based on Clear Body, Clear Mind.

== See also ==
- Bibliography of Scientology
- New York Rescue Workers Detoxification Project
- Scientology beliefs and practices
