= Edward Bagwell Purefoy =

Captain Edward Bagwell Purefoy (6 November 1868 – 19 November 1960) was an Irish officer in the British Army and lepidopterist. He was the first to discover the life cycle of the large copper butterfly (Lycaena dispar) and succeeded in establishing a colony of L. d. rutilus at his home in Greenfields, Tipperary. The colony survived from 1918 until shortly before his death. He also discovered the life history of the large blue butterfly (Phengaris arion) whose larvae live in the nest of the ant Myrmica sabuleti.

Purefoy was born on the Greenfields estate, Tipperary, in a landed Irish family, the second son of Captain (Honorary Colonel) Edward Bagwell-Purefoy (1819-1883) and Charlotte Wilkinson. One of his brothers was Wilfred Bagwell Purefoy (1862-1930). He was educated at Tonbridge School and joined the Kings Royal Rifle Corps in 1888. Two years later he was with the 16th Lancers. He saw action as an Adjutant in the Boer War with the 57th Buckinghamshire Company of the Imperial Yeomanry. He received a Queen's South Africa Medal with 6 clasps. he was invalided and returned home in July 1901 aboard the troopship Assaye. He retired in 1908 to Maidstone, having reached the rank of captain. Purefoy was interested in butterflies from his youth and began to collect and rear them. He became a Fellow of both the Royal Entomological Society and the Zoological Society of London, and between 1915 and 1926 he was successful in reintroducing a population of the large copper butterfly which had gone extinct in Britain around 1850. He carefully prepared a bog with the host plant Rumex hydrolapathum and released 120 larvae obtained from near Wolvega by H. E. Wittpen. He had also introduced L. d. rutilis in 1913 from near Berlin and the two apparently crossbred. Hybrid specimens were sent to Tring. A population survived on his estate in County Tipperary until around 1955. He also identified the association of an ant species in the life cycle of the large blue butterfly which became extinct in the UK after his death. He collaborated with F. W. Frohawk on this study.

Purefoy married in 1897 Frances Elizabeth Rogers (d. 1903), daughter of John Thornton Rogers. She died at The White House, Buckingham, on 25 February 1903. They had two sons including Lt. Col. Arthur Edward Bagwell-Purefoy (1903–1986).

He died in 1960 in Kent, at the age of 92.
