= Second Chance Program =

Substance abuse rehabilitation program tied to the Church of Scientology

Not related to San Diego Second Chance Program - a nonprofit organization operating in San Diego, California.

The Second Chance Program is a controversial detoxification and rehabilitation program based on the ideas of L. Ron Hubbard, the founder of the Church of Scientology. It focuses on individuals convicted of substance abuse offenses. The program utilizes a combination of saunas, vitamins, minerals and oils to tackle the effects of drug addiction. Other elements of the program aim to improve the educational and social abilities of inmates, and to instil a moral code for them to live by. First established in Baja California, Mexico, in 1995, Second Chance has attracted controversy over its methods and claimed success rates.

Between 1995 and 2009, Second Chance operated in prisons in Albuquerque, New Mexico, United States and in the Mexican cities of Tijuana and Ensenada. Its Mexican operations were closed down after it lost government funding. Its only U.S. operation was terminated in January 2009 by the mayor of Albuquerque. By that time it had received more than $1.5 million in public funding, but on closing it left debts of over $672,000 to the federal, state and city governments. Second Chance was proposed – but was rejected – for prisons in the states of Arizona, Nevada and New York.

Scientology's relationship with Second Chance has been a particular focus of contention, as the program uses many elements of Hubbard's doctrines that originated in, and are still used by, the Church of Scientology. The involvement of Nevada Assembly member Sharron Angle with Second Chance was a significant issue in the 2010 United States Senate elections.

== Background ==
The Second Chance Program was established by Rick Pendery, a former real estate developer and veteran Scientologist. During the 1970s he worked for Narconon, a drug rehabilitation program linked with the Church of Scientology, eventually becoming executive director for the U.S.-wide organization. Pendery also worked in an official capacity for Criminon, a Scientology-related program for prisoners that is based on the teachings of Scientology founder L. Ron Hubbard. In 1995 he established Second Chance, described as a "non-profit corporation that rehabilitates offenders in the criminal justice system" utilising Hubbard's methods.

== Establishments and proposed establishments ==
=== Mexico ===
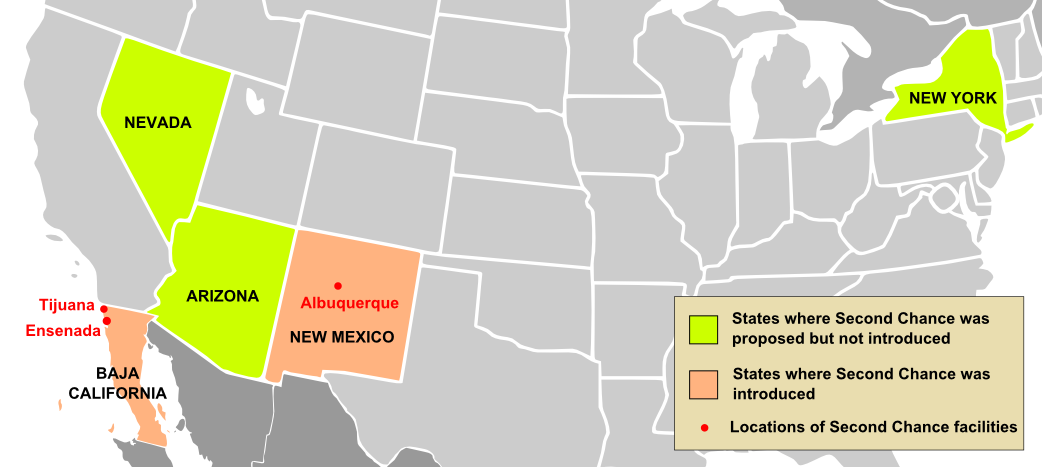
Overview of Second Chance's presence in the US and Mexico

Pendery unsuccessfully sought to open a Second Chance program in a U.S. prison, but succeeded in establishing the program in the state prison at Ensenada, Baja California, Mexico in 1995. The program was funded partly with his own money and partly with financial support from the Mexican government. It was subsequently approved for use in the state prison at Tijuana, though that program was suspended due to prisoner moves.

Second Chance was publicized in the U.S. and elsewhere, attracting a series of visits by political dignitaries. The Spanish judge Baltazar Garzón was among these dignitaries, and the government of Guatemala was reported to be interested in the program. In October 2001, two officials from Erie County Holding Center in Buffalo, New York visited Ensenada at a Scientology patron's expense. They were impressed enough to appeal for $700,000 to introduce Second Chance to their own prison, although lack of funds put the project on hold. The Ensenada program was eventually shut down after losing its government funding.

=== Arizona ===
State legislators in Arizona expressed interest in Second Chance in 2000–2001. State Rep. Mark Anderson (R) sponsored an amendment in 2000 that would have appropriated $1.5 million to fund a Second Chance program. However, the amendment was defeated after the head of the Arizona Department of Corrections came out strongly opposing Second Chance in hearings before the Arizona Senate Judiciary Committee, in which he noted that no nationally recognized drug treatment expert or institution had studied the program. He was concerned about its ties to Scientology and its methods.

State Senators Tom Smith (R) and Christine Weason (D) visited the Ensenada Second Chance facility in 2001 and declared themselves impressed by it, though neither sought to introduce legislation regarding the program in their own state. They pushed for the state government or private donors to find funding to support Second Chance, but the government rejected this idea; the cost of the program, at $15,000 a head, was regarded as prohibitive.

=== Nevada ===
Second Chance was promoted in Nevada by Assemblywoman Sharron Angle (R) from Reno. In February 2003 she proposed legislation to establish Second Chance for female prisoners and invited 35 legislators to accompany her on a trip to Ensenada to see the program in operation there. Angle had already twice visited Ensenada, once with a group of female legislators and later with Nevada Department of Corrections Director Jackie Crawford. She was impressed with the facility and sought to authorize a demonstration project in Nevada, supported by funding from the federal government. It emerged that the trip to Ensenada was being underwritten by Randall Suggs, an Arizona businessman and wealthy Scientologist who was later to play a major role in bankrolling Second Chance in New Mexico.

Angle's involvement with Second Chance attracted significant media and political interest. Assembly Majority Leader Barbara Buckley (D) advised legislators to vote against Angle's proposal, and the office of Governor Kenny Guinn (R) indicated that they wanted nothing to do with it. Angle received little support for her proposal and dropped the plan, blaming Democratic opposition.

==== 2010 United States Senate election controversy ====
In 2010, Second Chance again became the subject of controversy in relation to that year's United States Senate election in Nevada. Angle's previous support for Second Chance was used in attack ads by Sue Lowden, her opponent for the Republican nomination, and by incumbent Senator Harry Reid (D). An advert by Lowden portrayed Second Chance as a cushy health spa with inmates wearing prison uniforms being tended to by attractive masseuses. The voiceover asserted that, "Career politician and Senate candidate Sharron Angle sponsored a bill that would have used tax dollars to give massages to prisoners." The same line of attack was used in a Reid ad: "That's Sharron Angle. First, a Scientology plan to give massages to prisoners. Now she wants to get rid of Medicare and Social Security. What's next?"

During a KVBC-hosted debate on the program Face to Face with Jon Ralston, Angle was asked by host Jon Ralston "about recent whispers that an Angle legislative proposal to explore a program of massages and sweat-boxes for Nevada prisons was a strange foray into Scientology." Angle responded, "This program had a recidivism rate of less than ten percent. They aren't massages. ... it was more of a karate chop. The sauna was a sweat box. When you're in there with thirty guys it's not exactly a sauna." Angle also told the conservative newspaper Human Events that Second Chance was "not Scientology, but rather natural homeopathic medicine". (The program uses saunas and vitamin and mineral supplements, not homeopathy.)

=== New Mexico ===
In 2002, Pendery gave a presentation on Second Chance to a conference of the National Foundation of Women Legislators being held in San Diego, California. Sixty of them accepted his invitation to visit Ensenada to inspect the program. One of them, State Rep. Anna Crook (R) of New Mexico, was sufficiently impressed to ask the New Mexico Corrections Department to establish a pilot program. The department declined but Crook managed to obtain $350,000 for Second Chance from the 2004 federal appropriations bill. The majority of the remaining $300,000 required to fund the program was donated by Randall Suggs, the Scientologist who had underwritten Angle's visits to the Ensenada program. Another $300,000 was later allocated by the state of New Mexico. Crook convinced other New Mexico legislators to pass a bill allowing judges to sentence offenders to Second Chance in lieu of prison. To be eligible, inmates had to be facing imprisonment of six months to a year and had to have been diagnosed with chronic substance abuse problems. Prisoners with serious medical conditions or who had committed violent or sex offenses would not be accepted.

The program was established in Albuquerque. W. John Brennan, a former chief district judge who had been convicted in 2004 of drunk driving and cocaine possession, was hired by Second Chance as its president and was given the task of lobbying New Mexico judges to send inmates to attend the program. Second Chance received its first inmate in September 2006. In its first year it had several hundred referrals and on average housed about 65 inmates at a time in the old West Side jail in Albuquerque. Jurisdictions that sent inmates to Second Chance included Socorro, Grant, Taos and Sierra counties.

Although the program had some support, mainly from rural parts of the state, it was controversial from the start. The program's unconventional methods, unwillingness to disclose its finances and ties to Scientology aroused controversy, although Second Chance officials and a Scientology spokesperson said that there were no ties. Judge William Lang, the chief district judge in the Albuquerque area, was "highly suspicious" of the program. Lang cautioned many of New Mexico's district judges about the program, arguing that funding for treatment should go to existing programs that have a track record. He said that he was concerned by Second Chance's use of unlicensed substance abuse professionals, that its administrators were vague about its treatment model and that its corporate structure was unclear. Sheriff Darren White Bernalillo County told the Albuquerque Journal that he was "very, very skeptical" about Second Chance and would prefer the criminal justice system to "fund what we already know works." Some judges, unconvinced of its effectiveness, refused to refer offenders.

==== Financial difficulties ====
Second Chance faced increasing financial difficulties from its second year of operations. Brennan distanced himself from Second Chance, criticizing the way it was being operated and managed. By the end of 2007, Bernalillo County had ceased sending prisoners to the program and Second Chance's income from state funding was below the anticipated level. To make up for the shortfall, Second Chance began "jail shopping" in 2008 – offering rural counties the chance to offload their overflow inmates, including women, at a discounted rate. It appealed to the New Mexico legislature for $3.6 million of further funding. Although the proposal was again supported by Crook, Second Chance was awarded only $600,000 in July 2008. More money was raised from private donors but this was insufficient to cover expenses. It laid off employees, missed payroll deadlines and was ordered by a court to pay $78,000 after failing to pay for its video security system. An additional blow came when Brennan was forced to resign from his post as president of Second Chance after being charged with committing false imprisonment and battery on a household member.

The effectiveness and methods of Second Chance was also questioned. A study carried out by the University of New Mexico (UNM) found that the program was taking in violent offenders, in violation of its criteria, and that judges sending inmates to the program were unclear about its mandate. Following the presentation of the study to the New Mexico legislature, Curry County commissioners decided to end their contract with Second Chance. The commissioners stated that Second Chance had billed the county $4,500 without a signed contract and was not sending requested progress reports on the inmates in their care.

==== Investigation and termination ====
In November 2008, state officials expressed concern that the program had become a "dumping ground" for prisoners from around the state, including those convicted of violent felonies. Bernalillo County Sheriff Darren White commented: "They were established as a treatment facility and not a jail, and it appears to me that it's being run as such."

Albuquerque Mayor Martin Chávez (D) ordered an investigation to establish the status of the inmates and Second Chance was given a deadline in December 2008 to account for its inmates. However, Albuquerque Public Safety Director Pete Dinelli accused Second Chance of transferring inmates out of the facility just before the deadline expired. According to city officials, forty inmates were bused to an Albuquerque homeless shelter and another eight inmates were loaded into a van and taken out of the county. The city's chief of police reported:

"Acting upon a tip that inmates were going to be moved this morning from the Second Chance Center located on the West Mesa, I had personnel monitor the area. This morning between 7 and 10:30, officers observed 40 persons transported from Second Chance to St. Martin's Hospitality Center in Albuquerque. Additionally eight individuals were loaded in a van. The van was followed west on I-40 to the city limits. The van continued west from there to an unknown location."

The eight had been convicted of violent crimes; Dinelli commented that Second Chance appeared to be "deliberately deciding not to include those eight individuals. And to me failure to disclose is just as good as lying." It also emerged that Second Chance had violated its lease by building a large sauna inside the facility without permission. Second Chance's lease was terminated by the city a few days later.

Mayor Chávez said: "They simply didn't live up to their end of the agreement", citing Second Chance's housing of violent inmates and the apparent attempt to cover this up. He accused the program of misleading city and state officials, saying: "This program has been based on misrepresentation and deceit, and, frankly, I can't see how that would be the basis for a good recovery program." He was strongly critical of Second Chance's attempt to "avoid our oversight, our scrutiny" and said: "It's very evident to me that they were attempting to avoid oversight by taxpayers. This is not going to be tolerated." The notice of termination also accused Second Chance of misusing its facility as a jail rather than as a substance abuse rehabilitation center.

The program was terminated with effect from January 31, 2009, and the remaining twenty or so inmates were returned to their original jurisdictions. Second Chance made an unsuccessful last-minute appeal to legislators to save it from closure. By November 2008, it had received more than $1.5 million in public funding but by March 2009 it was reported to owe over $672,000 to the state, the city and the IRS in tax liens, utility bills and unpaid rent.

== Corporate structure and links with Scientology ==
The Second Chance program in Albuquerque was operated by two entities, against which tax liens were levied by the IRS and the state of New Mexico. The entities were Second Chance Program Inc., and Second Chance Center New Mexico LLC. Second Chance Program Inc. is a private nonprofit company while Second Chance Center is a private for-profit corporation. However, neither Second Chance's President Joy Westrum nor her husband, Executive Director Rick Pendery, have explained the roles or functions of the two entities. Chief District Judge William Lang complained in 2006 that he was unclear about the corporate structure of Second Chance.

From the start of Second Chance's involvement with the prison system in the U.S., its close ties with Scientology have been a controversial issue. The materials used by Second Chance are licensed from Criminon, another Scientology-related organization. Its officials denied that it was based on Scientology. Joy Westrum said in 2007 that it was "utilizes a protocol that is based on the discoveries of Mr. Hubbard. Second Chance is a completely secular program."

However, according to former and current Second Chance employees interviewed by the Albuquerque Journal, "everything that happens there is based in Scientology." Inmates and employees were required to go through courses and "ethics training" that were taken directly from Scientology; Scientology-related entities played a major role in operations at Second Chance; the program was predominately funded by wealthy Scientologist donors; and the program materials were taken directly from Narconon and Criminon, both run by Scientologists and classified by the IRS as "scientology-related entities". Several employees told the Journal that the program was merely a "front group" for Scientology. Mayor Chavéz commented: "It was always represented to us that this program was totally secular, but that some of it was based on L. Ron Hubbard's teachings ... If in fact what they were doing out there was teaching people directly out of L. Ron Hubbard's books, well, that just adds fuel to the fire."

== Methodology ==
The Second Chance Program consists of five core modules, combining course materials from Criminon and Narconon, two other Scientology-related entities:

- Drug Rehabilitation Module
- Study Skills Module
- Self Respect Module
- Life Skills Module
- Reintegration Module

The first four modules are delivered in the facility, while the final Reintegration Module begins in the facility and continues after release. Each of the modules consists of a number of courses, as summarized below:

| Module | Course | Purpose and methodology |
|---|---|---|
| Drug Rehabilitation Module | Orientation | Program introduction |
| | Communication Course | Equivalent to the Criminon Communication Course. Teaches students to communicate using "communication drills". |
| | Sauna Detox | Core element of Narconon. Aims to "detoxify" students by taking exercise, sauna sessions and massive doses of vitamins and minerals. |
| | Advanced Communication A | Equivalent to the Narconon Communication and Perception course. Intended to give students the ability to more fully communicate with others and their environment. |
| | Advanced Communication B | As per above. |
| Study Skills Module | Study Skills Course | Equivalent to the Narconon Learning Improvement and the Criminon Learning Skills for Life courses. Teaches students "how to study, how to overcome the barriers to comprehension, how to retain knowledge, and apply what they have learned". |
| Self-Respect Module | Way to Happiness Course | Equivalent to Criminon Way to Happiness Course. Utilizes L. Ron Hubbard's book The Way to Happiness to teach the student a new moral code. |
| Life Skills Modules | Changing Conditions of Life Course | Uses the Criminon Improving Conditions In Life course. Teaches a student to recognize the different conditions that a person or activity can be in, and how to improve conditions of life. |
| | Ups and Downs in Life Course | Uses the Criminon How to Deal with Ups and Downs in Life course. Deals with the skills needed "to chart one's own course in life, with honesty and integrity". |
| | Potential Trouble Source Handling Course. | Uses the Criminon How to Deal with Ups and Downs in Life course. Teaches the student how "to spot and handle negative personal associations which would tend to lead one astray", by identifying "anti-social personalities" in society. |

The program makes extensive use of saunas. In the case of the New Mexico Second Chance program, inmates spent four hours a day in the sauna, interrupted only by short breaks to drink water, eat raw vegetables or take a shower. The sauna sessions were preceded by exercise. Inmates were also required to take large doses of vitamins, minerals and olive oil. Participants perform "nerve assists" - a type of laying on of hands - on each other.

The communication drills involve inmates sitting in pairs, three feet apart, and going through a series of exercises that can last for hours at a time. Some involve sitting face-to-face, eyes closed, in total silence. Others involve a technique called "bull-baiting", where one insults the other, who is expected to remain silent. The Santa Fe Reporter gave an example:

"You stupid fat ass!" one goatee-wearing inmate blurts out at his pot-bellied "twin." When the recipient of the insult starts laughing, his provoking partner yells, "Flunk!"

Another drill requires inmates to sit opposite each other, look each other in the eye and read lines from Lewis Carroll's Alice in Wonderland.

=== Theoretical basis ===
Second Chance's program is based on what are said to be "secular discoveries" made by Hubbard. In particular, it draws on five key elements – the Purification Rundown, Study Technology, Hubbard's book The Way to Happiness, communication drills originally developed for Scientology auditing and an ethical framework derived from Scientology.

The sauna-based part of the program is based on Hubbard's belief that the body's fatty tissue accumulates drugs and other toxins over time. This is said to contribute to cravings, which make it harder to overcome addiction. The use of vitamins, minerals and oils is supposed to dislodge toxins stored in body fat, which is then sweated out during sauna sessions. However, this belief has been criticized by medical experts. Professor Bill Miller of UNM told The Wall Street Journal that he did not know of any scientific basis for it, and commented: "It wasn't clear to me what sort of scientific basis there was even for the conception of the program to begin with." A similar program was reviewed by the National Council Against Health Fraud, which found that such detoxification methods do the opposite of what Hubbard claimed. Instead of releasing fat into the bloodstream, high doses of niacin block the release of fat and can damage the liver.

According to Second Chance, it uses "cutting-edge study technology from Applied Scholastics", another Scientology-related organization. Study Technology is based on the idea that there are three fundamental barriers to learning. These are said to be a "lack of mass", when there is no object to illustrate a concept; a "skipped gradient", when difficult material needs to be studied incrementally, and a "misunderstood word", which can be resolved by using dictionaries in a process called "word clearing." David G. Bromley and Mitchell L. Bracey Jr. comment that "the concept of the misunderstood word ... has a central position within Scientology's teachings."^{p. 146} These principles were set out by Hubbard in "Barriers to Study", a Scientology publication issued in 1971.

The British sociologist Roy Wallis comments that Study Technology forms a key element of Scientology indoctrination by "assist[ing] those who are slow in grasping the principles of the movement." Its underlying principle is that a failure to understand a text is due not to the text being faulty – such as it being nonsensical – but because the reader has failed to understand a word or concept. Thereby, Wallis notes, "the individual learns to doubt his own judgement; to locate some meaning in the undoubted mystification of much of Hubbard's writing; or to acquiesce to some half-comprehended and yet half-incomprehensible statement in the hope that all will be made clear to him at some later point." The extreme tedium of "word clearing" leads, in Wallis's view, to "a further suspension of the individual's critical faculty, or to its inhibition, and to the ready acceptance of Hubbard's formulations as intrinsically meaningful."

The Way To Happiness is described by Joy Westrum of Second Chance as "a nonreligious moral code written by L. Ron Hubbard and based wholly on common sense." Published in 1980 as a 48-page booklet, it sets out 21 moral precepts for the reader to follow. It forms the core of the Criminon program and is also used in Narconon – all clients receive a pamphlet of The Way to Happiness when they begin the program. It has been widely distributed by individual Scientologists and Scientology-related organizations. A campaign in the early 1990s to distribute the booklet in U.S. schools was described in Scientology publications as "the largest dissemination project in Scientology history" and "the bridge between broad society and Scientology."

Criminon's Ups and Downs in Life course, which Second Chance uses, teaches the concept of "suppressive persons" and "potential trouble sources". These concepts come from Scientology. Ruth A. Tucker wrote that the concept appeared to have first been introduced into Scientology in the 1960s "as membership grew and as authoritarian control [by Hubbard] increased." Tucker notes that many of those who joined Scientology during this period were "well-educated people who prided themselves in independent thinking [who] struggled with the idea of allowing any other individual to completely dominate their opinions." Hubbard's definitions of the characteristics of "suppressive persons" were set out in Scientology works of the 1960s, notably his 1968 book Introduction to Scientology Ethics.^{p. 132}

== Claimed success rates and certifications ==
An investigation in 2008 by Albuquerque station KRQE found that Second Chance had a success rate far below what was claimed. Although it claimed that only 10% of its graduates went on to reoffend, Second Chance's own figures obtained by KRQE showed that the recidivism rate was closer to 32%. Some of the failures were among Second Chance's own instructors, six of whom had subsequently been charged with offenses ranging from drug dealing to smuggling contraband into a jail. A study carried out by the UNM found that within 100 days of graduation, 8.6% of Second Chance graduates committed new crimes and 22.9% violated their probations. Officials in Curry County stated that thirteen inmates from the county had undergone the program but only three graduated, two of whom subsequently returned to jail.

A different study of Second Chance in Mexico by Dr. Alfonso Paredes claimed that the program had a recidivism rate for those who completed the program of less than ten percent. However, the Albuquerque Journal noted that Dr. Paredes was reported to have studied Scientology (he is listed as having achieved the Scientology status of "clear" in 1991) and he is also on the advisory board of Narconon. UNM criminologist Paul Guerin, who carried out a study into Second Chance, was skeptical of the claims made by Paredes: "They need to drop this Mexican study. There's not a program ever that has produced those kinds of results."

As of March 2007, Second Chance was not certified by the Commission on Accreditation of Rehabilitation Facilities (CARF). Second Chance's website lists certifications for Narconon, but none for itself.

== See also ==
- Association for Better Living and Education
- Criminon
- Narconon
- Penology
- Politics of Nevada
- United States Senate election in Nevada, 2010
