= All About Radiation =

1957 Scientology book by L. Ron Hubbard

- Cover of first edition
- Author: L. Ron Hubbard
- Language: English
- Subject: Purification Rundown
- Publisher: Hubbard Association of Scientologists International
- Publication date: 1957
- Publication place: United States
- Media type: Print
- Pages: 110
- ISBN: 9780884044468
- OCLC: 1082936769

All About Radiation is a pseudoscientific book by L. Ron Hubbard in 1957 on the subject of radiation and atomic bombs, radiation's effects on the human body, techniques for reducing risk, and eradicating damage to the body. The book is considered part of Scientology's religious texts, and is mandatory reading for Scientologists doing the Purification Rundown. The book is controversial for claiming that radiation poisoning, and even cancer, can be cured by a course of vitamins and prolonged sweating. There is no known cure for radiation poisoning, and current medical practice is to provide palliative care until symptoms subside or the patient dies.

== Editions and authorship ==
It was first published in 1957 by the Hubbard Association of Scientologists International (HASI) and printed by Speedwell Printing Company, Kent, England. Later editions were published by the Church of Scientology's in-house publishing companies. Editions were issued in 1957, 1967, 1979 and 1989. As of 2024, the book has been out of print and no longer being sold by the Church of Scientology.

Early printings of the book were credited on the cover as simply "By a nuclear physicist and a medical doctor", while subsequent ones credited L. Ron Hubbard as being the nuclear physicist and "Medicus" as being the doctor. The 1979 edition credited the "medical doctor" as Richard Farley, and copyright by L. Ron Hubbard. The 1989 edition was copyrighted L. Ron Hubbard Library with introductions written by Gene Denk and Farley R. Spink.

=== Variations between editions ===
The book has gone through a number of printings since its initial run, with some modifications over the years, mostly to remove controversial assertions made in the original lectures. As it is a fundamental Scientology tenet that Hubbard's works are considered immutable standard tech, not to be altered in any way, except by Hubbard himself, these changes are considered evidence to Freezone practitioners that the current Church alters the text. The first part of the book is not by Hubbard and that the second part was not written by Hubbard but edited from four of his lectures given in April 1957 in London. These lectures are available since March 2005 with a transcription which makes it possible to see how the book text was edited from the lectures. The book was not reissued in June 2007 as part of the Golden Age of Knowledge program. Among the text removed from the book in later editions:

- "Alleviation of the remote effects and increased tolerance to radiation have been claimed as a result." (pg.49)
- "How is it that gamma rays go through walls but don't go through bodies?....I can fortunately tell you what is happening when a body gets hurt by atomic radiation. It RESISTS the rays! The wall doesn't resist the rays and the body does." (pg.79)
- "Scientology is the principle [sic] agency that is preventing and treating people for radiation at this time." (pg.110)
- "Dianazene runs out radiation – or what appears to be radiation. It also proofs a person against radiation to some degree. It also turns on and runs out incipient cancer. I have seen it run out skin cancer. A man who didn't have much liability to skin cancer (only had a few moles) took Dianazene. His whole jaw turned into a raw mass of cancer. He kept on taking Dianazene and it disappeared after a while. I was looking at a case of cancer that might have happened." (pg. 123–124)

=== Hubbard's falsified qualifications ===
Despite calling himself a nuclear physicist (some editions of the book even call him "one of America's first nuclear physicists" on the dustjacket), Hubbard was not a qualified physicist. His degree was from the unaccredited Sequoia University, a diploma mill. The one course in nuclear physics Hubbard took was in 1931 at George Washington University, whose records indicate that he scored an F in the course. Hubbard dropped out of school shortly thereafter, with a 2.28 grade point average.

Hubbard referred to himself as a nuclear physicist on many occasions in the 1950s, such as in the tape-recorded 1956 lecture A Postulate Out of a Golden Age, where he not only claimed to be a nuclear physicist, but that he was offered (and turned down) a U.S. Government post as one. This comment has been edited out of the CD version of the lecture currently offered by the L. Ron Hubbard Classic Lectures series.

The book was mentioned in the resulting report of an official inquiry in Australia:

"The Board heard evidence from a highly qualified radiologist who has made a special study of radiation and its effects. He said that Hubbard's knowledge of radiation, as displayed by his writings in All About Radiation, was the 'sort of knowledge that perhaps a boy who has read Intermediate Physics might, with a lot of misapprehensions and lack of understanding, demonstrate'. ... From this witness's evidence it is apparent that Hubbard is completely incompetent to deal with the subject of radiation and that his knowledge of nuclear physics is distorted, inaccurate, mistaken and negligible. No evidence was called which disputed in any way these conclusions."

— Kevin Victor Anderson in Report of the Board of Inquiry into Scientology (1965)

In February 1966, Hubbard defended his mail-order degree: "I was a Ph.D., Sequoia's [sic] University and therefore a perfectly valid doctor under the laws of the State of California". But only a month later, he announced: "having reviewed the damage being done in our society with nuclear physics and psychiatry by persons calling themselves "Doctor" [I] do hereby resign in protest my university degree as a Doctor of philosophy (Ph. D.)".

== See also ==
- Bibliography of Scientology
- Scientology beliefs and practices
- Purification Rundown
- Clear Body, Clear Mind
