= Wilfred Bagwell Purefoy =

British horse breeder and businessman (1862–1930)

Wilfred Bagwell-Purefoy (13 June 1862 – 10 March 1930) was a British breeder of racehorses and a director of several companies.

The eldest son of Colonel Edward Bagwell-Purefoy of the Greenfields estate, County Tipperary, Wilfred Bagwell-Purefoy was educated at Harrow School and then at the Royal Military College, Sandhurst. On 10 May 1882 he joined the 3rd King's Own Hussars and served for six years with the rank of lieutenant. He resigned from the army to start a stud farm at Greenfields, County Tipperary. He was the director of the Autostrop Safety Razor Company, a competitor of Gillette.

He collected rare orchids and was interested in gardening and natural history, but his introduction to the British Isles of exotic plants and insects was denounced by naturalists. His brother Edward Bagwell Purefoy served in the Boer war and was a lepidopterist who reintroduced the large copper on their estate.

Bagwell-Purefoy is chiefly remembered as one of a group of five gamblers who formed the Druid's Lodge confederacy. The gamblers owned Hackler's Pride, winner of the Cambridgeshire Handicap in 1903 and again in 1904, yielding them a spectacular payoff.
