= Samuel Epstein (physician) =

British American physician (1926–2018)

Samuel Seymour Epstein (April 13, 1926 – March 18, 2018) was a physician and, at the time of his death, professor emeritus of environmental and occupational health at the School of Public Health of the University of Illinois at Chicago. He is known for his contributions on avoidable causes of cancer, for which he was given the Right Livelihood Award in 1998. His papers are held at the National Library of Medicine in Bethesda, Maryland.

== Biography ==
Epstein was born in England on April 13, 1926, to Isidore and Gertrude Epstein and emigrated to the United States in 1960. For ten years, he held a position at the Children's Cancer Research Foundation and Harvard University. He then became a distinguished professor at Case Western Reserve University before moving to the University of Illinois in 1976. In addition to 270 scientific articles, he published 12 books, and was active in publicizing claims on the carcinogenic properties of chlordane pesticides, growth hormones in milk, nitrosamines in bacon, saccharin, beverage preservatives, and other food additives. His work drew criticism from the U. S. Food and Drug Administration, which claimed that his book The Safe Shopper's Bible misleads consumers by labeling safe products as carcinogenic. He was a strong critic of the American Cancer Society.

== Books ==
- Epstein, S. S.; Legator, M., eds. (1971), The Mutagenicity of Pesticides, Cambridge, Massachusetts: MIT Press, ISBN 9780262050081, LCCN 70130274.
- Epstein, S. S., ed. (1971), Drugs of Abuse—Genetic and Other Chronic Non-Psychiatric Hazards, Cambridge, Massachusetts: MIT Press, ISBN 0262050099.
- Epstein, S. S.; Grundy, D., eds. (1974), The Legislation of Product Safety. Consumer Health and Product Hazards. Vol. I. Chemicals, Electronic Products, Radiation, vol. 1, Cambridge, Massachusetts: MIT Press, ISBN 9780262050135. Vol. II. Cosmetics and Drugs, Pesticides, Food Additives, MIT Press, 1976.
- Epstein, S. S. (1978), The Politics of Cancer, San Francisco: Sierra Club Books. Abridged Japanese translation, 1978. Revised and expanded edition, Anchor/Doubleday Press, New York, 1979. The Politics of Cancer, Revisited, East Ridge Press, Fremont Center, N.Y., 1998.
- Epstein, S. S.; Pope, C.; Brown, L. (1982), Hazardous Waste in America, San Francisco: Sierra Club Books, ISBN 978-0871568076.
- Doyal, L.; Epstein, S. S. (1983), Cancer in Britain: The Politics of Prevention, London: Pluto Press, ISBN 9780861043941.
- Steinman, D.; Epstein, S. S. (1995), The Safe Shoppers' Bible, New York: Macmillan Publishing Company, ISBN 9780020820857.
- Epstein, S. S.; Steinman, D. (1997), The Breast Cancer Prevention Program, New York: Macmillan Publishing Company, ISBN 9780025361928. 2nd ed. (with Levert), Macmillan, 1998.
- Epstein, S. S. (2001), Got (Genetically Engineered) Milk! The Monsanto Milk Wars Handbook (E-book), New York: Seven Stories Press, ISBN 9781583222065.
- Epstein, S. S. (2001), Unreasonable Risk. How to Avoid Cancer from Cosmetics and Personal Care Products, Environmental Toxicology, ISBN 9780971518605. 2nd ed., Environmental Toxicology, 2005. Japanese ed., Lyon-sha Publishing, 2006.
- Epstein, S. S. (2005), Cancer-Gate: How to Win the Losing Cancer War, Baywood Publishing, ISBN 9780895033543.
- Epstein, S. S. (2006), What's In Your Milk?, Trafford Publishing, ISBN 9781412089203.
- Epstein, S. S. (2009), Toxic Beauty, BenBella Books, ISBN 9781933771625.
- Epstein, S. S. (2011), NATIONAL CANCER INSTITUTE and AMERICAN CANCER SOCIETY: Criminal Indifference to Cancer Prevention and Conflicts of Interest, Xlibris, Corp, ISBN 9781462861347.
