= Purifoy =

Purifoy may refer to:

- 13063 Purifoy, a minor planet designation

== People with the name Purifoy ==
- Bill Purifoy (1959–2013), American football defensive end in the United States Football League
- John Purifoy (1842–1927) American politician from Alabama
- Loucheiz Purifoy (born 1992), American professional football defensive back in the Canadian Football League
- Noah Purifoy (1917–2004), American visual artist
- Tiara Purifoy, contestant on the TV series American Idol season 3
- Tristan Purifoy (born 1990), American football wide receiver in the National Arena League

== Others ==
- Jake Purifoy, fictional character in The Southern Vampire Mysteries book series and TV series
