= Narconon =

Scientology's drug rehab program

- Formation: 1966
- Founder: William Benitez, L. Ron Hubbard
- Type: Scientology front group
- Headquarters: Hollywood, Los Angeles, California, U.S.
- President: Clark Carr
- Website: narconon.org

Narconon International (commonly known as Narconon) is a Scientology organization which promotes the theories of founder L. Ron Hubbard regarding substance abuse treatment and addiction. Its parent company is the Association for Better Living and Education (ABLE), which is owned and controlled by the Church of Scientology. Headquartered in Hollywood, California, United States, Narconon operates several dozen residential centers worldwide, chiefly in the U.S. and western Europe. The organization was formed in 1966 by Scientologist William Benitez with Hubbard's help, and was incorporated in 1970.

The Scientology organization and Narconon state that Narconon is a secular program independent of Hubbard's writings about Scientology, and that it provides legitimate drug education and rehabilitation. The organization has been described by many government reports and former patients as a Scientology front group.

Hubbard's writings, which underlie the program, assert that drugs and their metabolites are stored in the body's fatty tissue, causing the addict's cravings when partially released later on, and can be flushed out through a regimen known as Purification Rundown, which involves exercise, sauna and intake of high doses of vitamins. This hypothesis is contradicted by experimental evidence, and is not medically accepted. There are no independently recognized studies that confirm the efficacy of the Narconon program.

The program has garnered considerable controversy as a result of its origins in Scientology and its methods. Its drug rehabilitation treatment has been described as "medically unsafe", "quackery" and "medical fraud", while academic and medical experts have dismissed its educational program as containing "factual errors in basic concepts such as physical and mental effects, addiction and even spelling". Narconon's facilities have been the location of several deaths, some of which have been linked to a lack of trained medical personnel on site.

== History ==
=== Origins ===
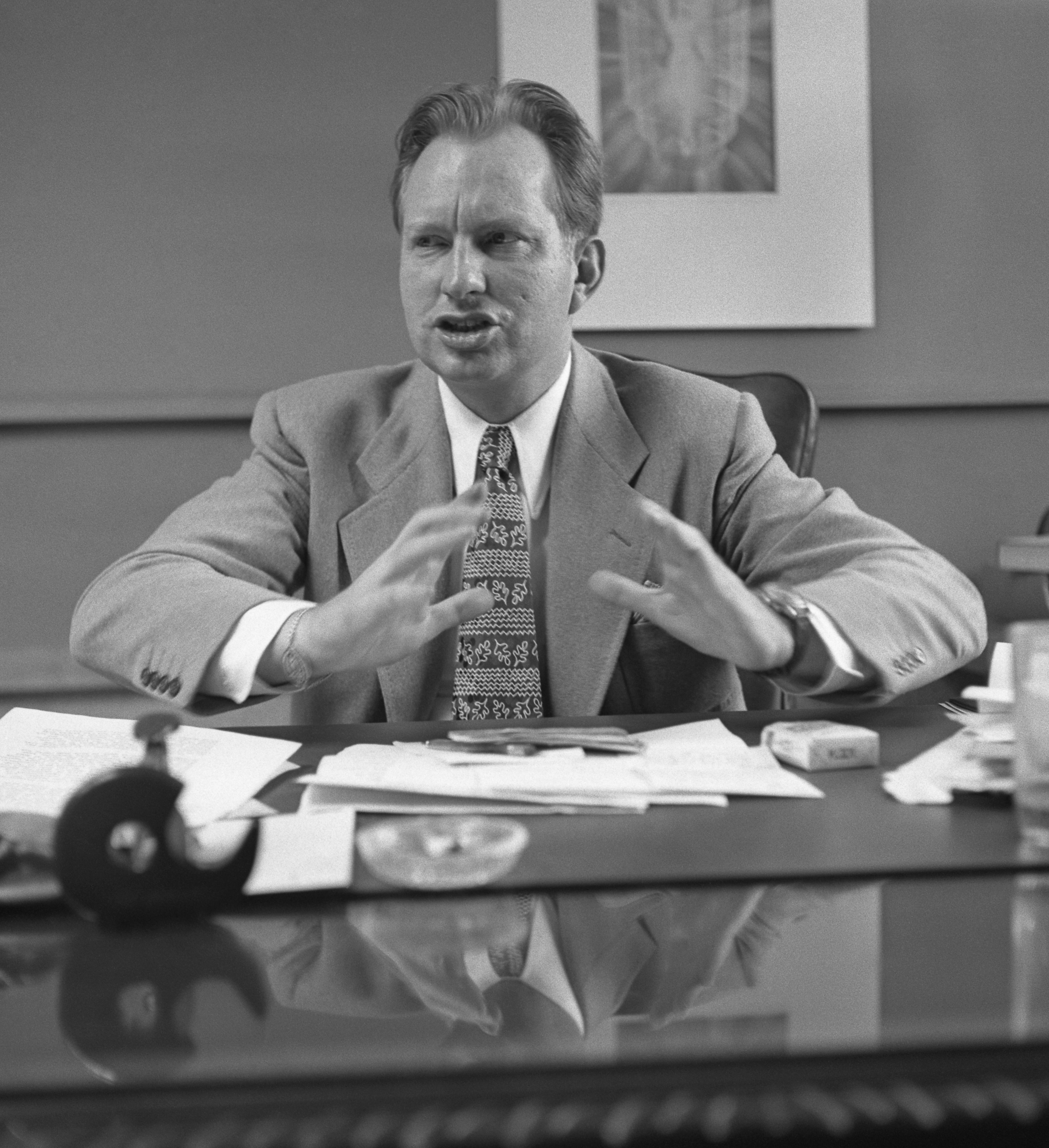
L. Ron Hubbard, founder of Scientology, upon whose ideology the Narconon program is based.

Narconon was established 19 February 1966 as a drug rehabilitation program based on the book Scientology: The Fundamentals of Thought by L. Ron Hubbard, the creator of Scientology, and was first delivered to drug abusers in the Arizona prison system. The name "Narconon" originally referred not to an organization but to the program.

Narconon's creator was William C. Benitez, a former Arizona prison inmate who had served time for narcotics offenses. His work was supported by Hubbard, and in 1970 Hubbard sponsored the incorporation of Narconon as an organization. The organization was co-founded by Benitez and two Scientologists, Henning Heldt and Arthur Maren.

Even before Narconon became established, Scientology and Dianetics were promoted as providing a cure for drug addiction. In 1970, the Rev. John W. Elliot, senior minister of the Church of Scientology and chairman of its Drug Abuse Prevention team, announced that "Dianetic Counseling" had "completely cured 30 out of 30 people" who came to Scientology for help. Rev. Elliott also reported that Dianetics could cure hay fever, asthma and arthritis.

In the early days of Narconon, no distinction was made between Scientology's "religious" and "secular" branches; Narconon was considered by Scientologists to be an example of Scientology in action. "Narconon, with the Scientology program, is another example of the workability of Dianetics and Scientology", said an adherent in 1970. "The program has been expanded and is used in all Scientology churches and missions".

The Narconon website reports that the keynote of Narconon is that the "...individual is responsible for his own condition and that anyone can improve his condition if he is given a workable way to do so... man is basically good and it is pain, suffering, and loss that lead him astray". It positions the program as an approach to rehabilitation without recourse to alternative drugs. This early program did not, however, deal directly with withdrawal symptoms. In 1973, the Narconon program adopted procedures to include drug-free withdrawal.

=== 21st century ===
A number of Scientologist celebrities have publicly attested that Narconon was helpful in their own lives. Musician Nicky Hopkins and actress Kirstie Alley have credited Narconon for their recovery from addiction to drugs and alcohol. Alley subsequently became a public spokesperson for Narconon. Elsewhere, the New York Rescue Workers Detoxification Project has used Hubbard's sauna detoxification regimen in an effort to improve the health of rescue workers exposed to toxic substances from 9/11, although the results are disputed. Toxicologist Dr Ronald E. Gots described the Narconon / Purification Rundown program in a 1987 report on its use by California firefighters:

The treatment in California preyed upon the fears of concerned workers, but served no rational medical function. ... Moreover, the program itself, developed not by physicians or scientists, but by the founder of the Church of Scientology, has no recognized value in the established medical and scientific community. It is quackery.

In 2004 and 2005, WISE at Work magazine and International Scientology News each published articles clarifying the relationship between Narconon and Scientology; each placed Narconon in Scientology's "Division 6B", with responsibility for introducing the public to Scientology services.

By the end of 2005, according to the International Association of Scientologists (IAS), Narconon was operating 183 rehabilitation centers around the world. New centers opened that year included in Hastings, East Sussex, England (now closed), and in Battle Creek, Michigan. Narconon President Clark Carr asserted that drug prevention lectures "have been given to over 2 million children and adults over several decades... and are currently being delivered across the United States, all New England States, Washington D.C., Georgia, Florida, Oklahoma and surrounding states, Michigan and Illinois, Texas, New Mexico, Idaho, California, Nevada, Hawaii and possibly others" in response to an inquiry from The Humanist.

On 17 July 2006, the Narconon center in Trois-Rivières, Quebec, Canada, started a website at Narcodex.ca. Narcodex was a wiki purported to contain drug information. The domain name of Narcodex.ca was owned by ABLE Canada, a Scientology subsidiary. The funding for the website came entirely from Narconon Trois-Rivières, which also controlled the content on the site. The center was closed by the local health authorities in 2012.

In July 2013, Narconon proposed to acquire the 150 acre Hockley, Ontario, estate of Donald Blenkarn, who had died the previous year. Narconon planned to convert the estate into a rehabilitation center for alcohol and other drug use, but drew widespread opposition from residents who were opposed to the presence of a rehab center, and to the presence of Narconon and Scientology specifically. The Blenkarn family ultimately chose to sell to an unidentified person within the community for below the asking price, and rejected a counter-offer from Narconon.

In January 2014, Narconon instituted a Hubbard-based detoxification program in Annapolis, Maryland, to treat veterans suffering from war-related conditions. The treatments were funded by the Department of Defense through a September 2010 grant for $633,677 given to University of Albany, where David O. Carpenter serves as the director of the school's Institute for Health and the Environment and is the program's chief investigator. As of December 2014, seven Gulf War veterans completed the program. It was administered on a seven-day-per-week schedule, with the regimen being completed in 33 days. The program's purpose was to discover whether Hubbard's program has a scientific basis for therapy and whether it was effective in reducing symptoms and improving the functional status of veterans whose physical pain and anxiety improved upon completion of the program. Carpenter affirmed that the program was effective in his own treatment.

== Narconon and Scientology ==
Front page of Narconon News volume 6 issue 3, Special Edition, 1974, depicting Narconon as starting people up Scientology's Bridge to Total Freedom.

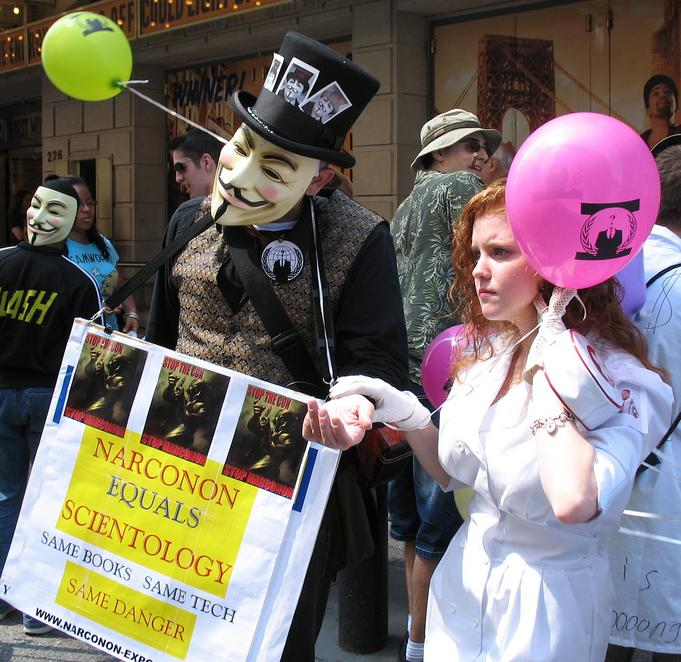
As a Scientology front group, Narconon has attracted protests from anti-Scientology campaigners.

Narconon's affiliation with the Church of Scientology has made the program a focus of controversy. The organization has never denied that many of its administrators are committed Scientologists or that its methods are based on the teachings of L. Ron Hubbard.

In its early days, Narconon used unaltered Scientology materials in its courses, and Scientology executives ran the organization; founders Heldt and Maren were high-ranking members of the Church's public-relations department known as the Guardian's Office (GO). In April 1970, Scientology spokesman Max Prudente described Narconon as "based solely on the philosophy and tenets of Scientology", claiming an 85% success rate.

However, as Narconon promoted its drug treatment services to a variety of governmental jurisdictions within the U.S., the organization repeatedly found itself at the center of controversy when its ties to Scientology were raised by journalists or politicians. Such ties raised questions about the constitutional appropriateness of governmental bodies sponsoring a religiously affiliated organization (see Lemon v. Kurtzman). These problems were further intensified by claims that the program was medically unsound and served as a fundraising and recruitment program for Scientology.

By the late 1970s, Scientology was keen to disavow its connection with Narconon. When the FBI raided Scientology offices on 8 July 1977, papers seized revealed that Scientologists were instructed to refer to Narconon and other "front groups" using code names:

Codes should be used for the names of front groups that we do not want connected with the C of S and for anything that gives specific and actual evidence that the C of S is in legal control of B6 groups [of which Narconon was one].

In 1994, John Wood, the head of Narconon UK, denied any connection between Narconon and Scientology, saying, "I know beyond doubt that Narconon does not recruit for nor promote the Church of Scientology", despite the final stage in Narconon's process for patients at that time being "Route to nearest Org (Scientology organisation) for further services", but by 2001 Scientology spokesman Graeme Wilson was describing Narconon as Scientology's "affiliate charity".

A March 1998 Boston Herald series exposed how two Scientology-linked groups, Narconon and the World Literacy Crusade, used anti-drug and learn-to-read programs to gain access to public schools without disclosing their Scientology ties. Heber Jentzsch, president of the Church of Scientology International, who said in an interview that the Purification Rundown saved his life, confirmed after the Herald report was published that Scientology's Los Angeles law firm had hired private investigators to look into the personal life of Herald reporter Joseph Mallia, who wrote the series. The Herald noted numerous other instances over the years where reporters were harassed with "noisy investigations" after writing stories exposing Scientology.

In Montreal, Narconon employees describe themselves as "FSM's", a Scientology abbreviation for Field Staff Member, while in Georgia a memo released under court order showed Narconon executive director Mary Rieser reporting directly to Scientology's Office of Special Affairs (OSA) as well as to parent organization ABLE.

== Drug rehabilitation program ==
The treatment ... served no rational medical function. Moreover, the program itself ... has no recognized value in the established medical and scientific community. It is quackery.

— Toxicologist Dr Ronald E. Gots

Since its establishment, Narconon has faced considerable controversy over the safety and effectiveness of its rehabilitation methods and the organization's links to Scientology. Medical professionals have been sharply critical of Narconon's methods, which rely on theories of drug metabolism that are not supported by mainstream toxicology. Narconon teaches that drugs reside in body fat, and remain there indefinitely; and that to recover from drug abuse, addicts can remove the drugs from their fat through saunas and use of vitamins. Experts disagree with this basic understanding of physiology, saying that no significant amount of drugs are stored in fat, and that drugs can't be "sweated out" as Narconon claims. In one 2005 report, experts stated that Narconon's treatment methods "does not reflect accurate, widely accepted medical and scientific evidence." Particular criticism has been directed at the therapy's use of vitamins (including massive doses of niacin) and extended sauna sessions.

David Root, an occupational medicine practitioner and a member of the Narconon Scientific Advisory Board, defended the program's validity. He told the San Francisco Chronicle in 1991 that drugs and other poisons "come out through the skin in the form of sebaceous, or fatty, sweat. The material is frequently visible and drips, or is rubbed off on towels". This apparently explains the need for "daily doses of vitamins, minerals, and oils, including niacin".

Narconon's "New Life Program" consists of two principal stages: detoxification and rehabilitation. The program, adapted from Hubbard's Purification Rundown, consists of six elements: exercise, sauna, supplements, sufficient liquids, regular diet with fresh vegetables, and adequate sleep.

According to Narconon spokesman John Bitinas, there are more than 200 beds at Narconon Arrowhead, the program's flagship center in Pittsburg County, Oklahoma. Asked whether medications are used to help patients going through withdrawal, he said that, "Narconon is drug-free, meaning we do not use substitute drugs as part of our rehabilitation process." All patients are assessed at enrollment to determine whether they are "psychiatrically or medically qualified for the level of care we offer here. If they are found to need a higher level of care then Narconon is qualified to offer at that time, they are referred to a more appropriate facility." If patients require medications to treat physical conditions like diabetes or infections, those medications are prescribed by the Narconon physician, who is part-time but available on-call on a 24-hour basis, according to Bitinas. Each U.S. patient spends an average of three to four months at Narconon, for a fee that ranges from $10,000 to around $30,000.

=== Overview ===
The Narconon detoxification program is based on Hubbard's theory that "small amounts of drugs [and their metabolites] stored in fat cells are released at a later time causing the person to re-experience the drug effect and desire to use again." According to Narconon, exercise helps to release toxins from body fat as fat deposits are burned for energy, while concurrently releasing chemicals via sweating, sebum (produced by the skin's sebaceous glands), and regular bowel movements.

Narconon is not a medical model. The program rejects the disease model of addiction, and its literature has described the terminology used by that model as being disempowering to patients.

The Narconon program follows the "social education" model of drug rehabilitation. The program is four to six months long and includes a regimen of detoxification that includes "aerobic exercise, dry-sauna sweating, hydration and nutrition supplements; life skills trainings; and personalized plans for after-graduation living." The main premise of the detoxification regimen is that "the activation of drug residuals stored in the body can elicit drug cravings in the former drug user thus tempting relapse. The Narconon detoxification regimen is designed to eliminate drug residues from drug users' bodies and thus reduce the cravings that may be caused by these residues."

Experts from mainstream medicine and toxicology have repeatedly argued that Hubbard's method has no validity: "one may from a pharmacological point of view strongly question the idea of using enforced sweating to expel drugs from the body", said Professor Folke Sjoqvist in a 1996 report for the Swedish government, while an Oklahoma Board of Mental Health report from 1990 states that, "Although minute quantities of some drugs may be found in sweat the amount represents a small fraction of drug elimination". In a deposition concerning the death of Patrick Desmond at Narconon Georgia, expert witness Louis A. Casal was questioned by plaintiff's attorney Jeff Harris:

Harris: And the sauna program, what Narconon contends is that in—it in fact detoxifies your body. True?
Casal: True.
Harris: But there's no scientific basis that you can point me to to support that contention, is there, sir?
Casal: You're correct.
Harris: So when Narconon states that the sauna program detoxifies its students, you're not aware, as a medical doctor, of any scientific basis for that contention?
Casal: I agree.
Harris: The vitamin regimen. You're familiar with the vitamin regimen?
Casal: Yes, sir.
Harris: What—do you have an opinion about whether or not the vitamin regimen is effective at treating addiction?
Casal: I believe that it has very likely no bearing whatsoever on the treatment of addiction.

Narconon asserts that methadone, amphetamines, methamphetamines, morphine, copper, mercury, and other toxins, some consumed years earlier, leave the body by means of sweating. This contrasts with the view of the body's drug retention taken by mainstream science, which has found that most recreational drugs leave the body within a few days (with the exception of cannabis, which in the case of frequent use can remain in the body for up to a month).

=== Niacin ===
According to Narconon, vitamin and mineral supplements are needed to address nutritional deficiencies and offset nutrient loss due to sweating. Other key elements in the program are the use of niacin, which Hubbard believed to increase free fatty acid mobilization, and the inclusion of polyunsaturated fats that he thought to increase the excretion rate of some toxin compounds. Together with a proper amount of sleep, this regime is thought by Narconon to mobilize and eliminate long-term stored toxins.

Narconon's "drug bomb" includes a niacin dose of 4000 mg/day. The risk to patients of taking high-dose niacin is one reason why medical experts assessing the Narconon program have found that it is a danger to patients; the program has been banned in a number of jurisdictions including Quebec and France as a result.

Because Narconon doctrines dictate that patients undergoing its program exhibit physical symptoms relating to the drugs that are (supposedly) being "sweated out," and because Narconon's staff are not medically qualified or typically qualified in orthodox drug rehabilitation, there is a risk that serious medical symptoms—from niacin overdose or from other causes—may be misinterpreted by Narconon staff as the desirable effects of detoxification:

The Narconon Program exposes its patients to the risk of delayed withdrawal phenomena such as seizures, delirium and/or hallucinations. ... The Narconon program presents a potential risk to the patients of the Narconon program that delayed withdrawal phenomena such as seizures, delirium or hallucination that are occasionally seen several days after cessation of drugs such as benzodiazepines, may be misinterpreted by Narconon's non-medical staff as the effect of mobilizing the drug from fat during the sauna sweat-out procedure period. There is also a potential risk that the reported re-experience of the abused drugs' effect during the sauna sweat-out program may be the result of misinterpreted symptoms of hyperthermia or electrolyte imbalance ...

=== Training routines ===
The remainder of the Narconon course uses Scientology's "Training Routines" or "TRs". They were originally devised by Hubbard to teach communications skills to Scientologists. In the Narconon variant, these courses claim to be designed to rehabilitate drug abusers. These routines sometimes include TR 8, which involves the individual commanding an ashtray to "stand up" and "sit down", and thanking it for doing so, as loudly as they can. Former Scientologists say that the purpose of the drill is for the individual to "beam" their "intention" into the ashtray to make it move.

=== Efficacy ===
There is currently no reliable evidence for the effectiveness of Narconon as a primary or secondary drug prevention program.

— Norwegian Knowledge Centre for the Health Services

Narconon typically claims success rates as high as 75% of the graduates of its program remaining drug-free for the rest of their lives, and has in the past claimed "very close to a 100% success rate". However, these numbers are highly controversial, and there exist no independent studies that support these claims.

Independent researchers have found considerably lower rates of success. At least one website critical of Narconon cites a Swedish research study that gives a rate of 6.6%. Narconon has reported the same study's findings as being much more favorable, although its representation of the study is greatly simplified.

The Church of Scientology claims that "the Narconon success rate is not merely the world's highest, it is four times better than international averages", while a systematic review of evidence regarding Narconon's efficacy conducted by the Norwegian Knowledge Centre for the Health Services on behalf of the Norwegian Directorate of Health concluded that:

Collectively, one quasi-experimental and five non-experimental studies document lack of evidence of the preventive effects of these programs. Thus, there is currently no reliable evidence for the effectiveness of Narconon as a primary or secondary drug prevention program. This is partly due to the insufficient research evidence about Narconon and partly due to the non-experimental nature of the few studies that exist.

In April 2014, the town council of Wyong, New South Wales, Australia refused permission for Narconon to open a new centre at nearby Yarramalong, saying that the program's method of treatment was a factor in the decision. Wyong Mayor Doug Eaton said:

To be allowed in the area it'd have to be defined as a hospital and there wasn't enough material to demonstrate it could be so defined because my understanding of the rehab process it that it is more of a religious process than it is a medical process.

— Church of Scientology drug rehab centre rejected, Australian Broadcasting Corporation

== Education program ==
=== Florida ===
In 1999, Scientologists from Clearwater, Florida, tried to get a Narconon drug education program instituted into the Pinellas County school district curriculum. After a hearing on the matter, a school district committee refused to allow students to participate in an anti-drug program based on Hubbard's teachings, citing that teaching students about the "tone scale" and other trappings of Scientology was inappropriate for a drug education program for their schools.

=== California ===
In 2004, Narconon offered an anti-drug program to public schools in California, free of charge. However, a series of articles in the San Francisco Chronicle in June 2004, resulted in California school officials investigating Narconon's claims. The study found that Narconon's program did not reflect medically and scientifically based practices and that it offered students misleading information about drug use and abuse. As a result of the investigation, on 23 February 2005, the state's superintendent of public instruction, Jack O'Connell, officially recommended that all schools in the state reject the Narconon program. O'Connell's secretary announced that the school systems in Los Angeles and San Francisco had dropped the program. The president of Narconon, Clark Carr, responded that the study presented only limited information about his organization's work, and that those efforts were "accurate and relevant to the current challenges children face with drugs."

A May 2014 investigation by the Chronicle discovered that some California schools were still using the Narconon program, in spite of the 2004 decision. Steve Heilig, one of the experts who evaluated the Narconon education program on behalf of the school district and found it to be scientifically unsound, urged schools to check the accreditation of drug education programs before allowing them access to students, saying, "One imperative of drug education is that we not deceive students, as once they discover that you are not telling them factual information, they are likely to disbelieve everything you say".

=== United Kingdom ===
The UK prisons ombudsman recommended to prison governors that Narconon rehabilitation programs not be used in prisons although some schools in the UK are using these programs; The Sunday Times said this was because schools are less aware of Narconon's links to Scientology. In September 2012, the 149 Church of England schools in the Diocese of London were warned not to accept offers from Narconon to give lectures to their pupils, following complaints from parents.

In November 2016, Narconon was reported to have given talks on the dangers of drug addiction in two schools in Camden, London. Elizabeth Kitcatt, Camden School for Girls headteacher, said in a statement that the students found the talk "very useful", while Harry Shapiro, Director of DrugWise, called out the schools for being unaware to the group's ties to Scientology. A Brecknock Primary spokeswoman said: "The school's deputy head was in the room for the whole drug awareness talk and at no point was there any mention of Scientology or any religious connotations. It was marketed as an anti-drug talk and that's exactly what it was". President of Narconon UK Noel Nile claimed that the group was "in the business of saving lives".

=== Cecchini/Lennox study ===
In 2008, Narconon executive Marie Cecchini published, with Richard Lennox, a paper that claimed to show that the Narconon educational program reduced drug use among youths. However, the study was funded by Narconon's parent organisation, ABLE, and subsequent correspondence in the same journal asserted that the study's conclusions were contradicted by its own data: that the control group "were more likely to resist pressures to take drugs" than the Narconon group.

== Deaths ==
=== Jocelyne Dorfmann, Grancey-sur-Ource, France (1984) ===
In 1984, a 34-year-old French woman named Jocelyne Dorfmann died from an untreated epilepsy seizure while undergoing treatment at a Narconon center in Grancey-sur-Ource (near Dijon). The assistant-director of that center was convicted of lack of assistance to a person in danger. The Narconon center was closed. Medical experts reported that her death was caused by "an epileptic seizure due to the absence of sufficient treatment at its beginning and of emergency treatment during the seizure". Narconon staff failed to call for medical assistance, as a result of which Dorfmann died.

=== X del Pozo, Cercedilla, Spain (1985) ===
In 1985, a young man surnamed Del Pozo, a native of Ceuta, injected himself with an overdose of heroin while he was in Narconon Cercedilla, in the Community of Madrid. He was taken by ambulance to the hospital, where he died. The El Escorial Court opened an investigation, but ended up closing the case for lack of evidence and testimonies to clarify the incident.

=== Paride Ella and Giuseppe Tomba, Valsassina, Italy (1995) ===
In 1995, two young men, Paride Ella (22) and Giuseppe Tomba (26), died suddenly at the Narconon centre in Taceno, Province of Lecco, Italy. Ella died of acute kidney failure (symptoms consistent with a niacin overdose), while the recorded cause of death for Giuseppe Tomba was heart attack. Both patients suffered similar symptoms, namely vomiting and diarrhea, for days before their deaths. The young men died within a few days of one another, in the so-called "detoxification" stage of the Narconon program.

The Narconon centre had no medical staff and was unable in either case to diagnose the seriousness of their condition. Before the deaths, Taceno's mayor had asked for the Narconon centre to be closed.

=== Federica X, Torre dell'Orso, Italy (2002) ===
In 2002, a 33-year-old Italian patient identified as "Federica X", from Torre dell'Orso, died from peritonitis, according to her autopsy. She first began to suffer from stomach pains on Monday 7 October, and was driven to a first aid station where she was given painkillers. Federica was driven to hospital the following evening, where she died soon after being admitted in a coma.

Narconon patient Giovanni Costa later stabbed staff member Rodolfo Savino, whom Costa claimed had ignored Federica's symptoms and had given her insufficient medical aid. Costa was arrested and charged with attempted murder.

=== Patrick Desmond, Norcross, Georgia, United States (2008) ===
Patrick W. "Ricko" Desmond, a former member of the United States Marine Corps, died at Narconon Georgia on 11 June 2008, aged 28, from a heroin overdose. Desmond's family alleged wrongful death and filed a lawsuit against Narconon, claiming that their actions led to his death and that Narconon falsely claimed to be a licensed inpatient program.

WSB-TV in Atlanta reported that:

The evidence includes documents with Narconon's letterhead with the word "outpatient" when reporting Patrick's death to state investigators, but letterhead on letters sent to Florida courts omitted the word "outpatient".

Desmond's family paid Narconon $30,000 for his treatment. Narconon Georgia director Mary Rieser commented to a reporter:

There's things that people do to themselves. Of course it's sad.

The lawsuit between Narconon Georgia and the Desmond family was settled out of court in February 2013, three days before jury selection was scheduled to begin. The settlement followed harsh sanctions against Narconon by the trial judge Stacey K. Hydrick, who said in a court order that Narconon Georgia had:

Intentionally, willfully and repeatedly provided false and misleading responses to plaintiff's discovery requests regarding issues relevant to the resolution of this case

and that it had:

Repeatedly failed to produce, and on multiple occasions falsely denied the existence of clearly relevant, responsive documents and information.

Judge Hydrick withdrew Narconon's response to the Desmond family's allegations, meaning that if the case had not been settled then the family's claims would essentially have gone unopposed by Narconon.

Narconon International denied that it had any connection with Narconon Georgia, although documents disclosed in the Patrick case showed that Narconon Georgia's executive director, Mary Rieser, reported to Narconon International, Scientology's Office of Special Affairs, and to ABLE, describing in her reports the evening of Patrick's death:

On June 10th 2008 a student was watching a basketball game late in the evening with Brad in his apartment. They consumed tequila and the student gained access to his cash which was supposed to be locked in that apartment. A sad thing happened later in the evening. Two days later we tested Brad and he was dirty for methadone, PCP, cocaine and methamphetamine.

— Mary Rieser, "Things That Shouldn't Be", 14 August 2008, Estate of Patrick Desmond v Narconon of Georgia et al)

=== John Cunningham, Watsonville, California, United States (2015) ===
In July 2015, John Cunningham, a 58-year-old Boeing employee addicted to benzodiazepines, was sent by his sister to Redwood Cliffs, a Narconon facility in Watsonville, California. The staff at Redwood Cliffs sent Cunningham to be detoxed to Bright Futures Recovery (BFR), a newly-opened, "non-medical" facility, which was also closely associated with Redwood Cliffs and Narconon, and which had opened only six weeks prior. According to the family's lawyer, the detox facility was “horribly run,” and had "no idea how to handle a serious case like Cunningham’s". They made him quit all drugs cold turkey, including medication he had been prescribed to treat depression, and was sent to "a local ER three times in just five days for withdrawal symptoms". On 22 August 2015, seven days after arriving at BFR, he was found dead after being left alone in his room long enough for him to "hang himself by a belt in his bedroom closet". Cunningham's sister did not know that Narconon was a Scientology outfit until after her brother's death, and said she would not have sent him there if she had.

Represented by attorney H. Gavin Long, Cunningham's family sued Redwood Cliffs and Bright Futures Recovery for $1 million each. The rehabilitation centers countered with an offer of "$100,000 and $350,000, respectively". The family refused and took the case to a jury in Santa Cruz. After a twelve-day trial where Narconon tried to argue that they had not referred Cunningham to Bright Futures Recovery, the jury awarded the family $11 million. According to journalist Tony Ortega, it was very rare for the case to go to a jury trial, and that since the filing of the court case, "Scientology cut ties with its Northern California Narconon network, and the Redwood Cliffs facility has closed. But Narconon is still on the hook for its share of the verdict".

=== Deaths at Narconon Arrowhead, Oklahoma, United States (2009–2012) ===
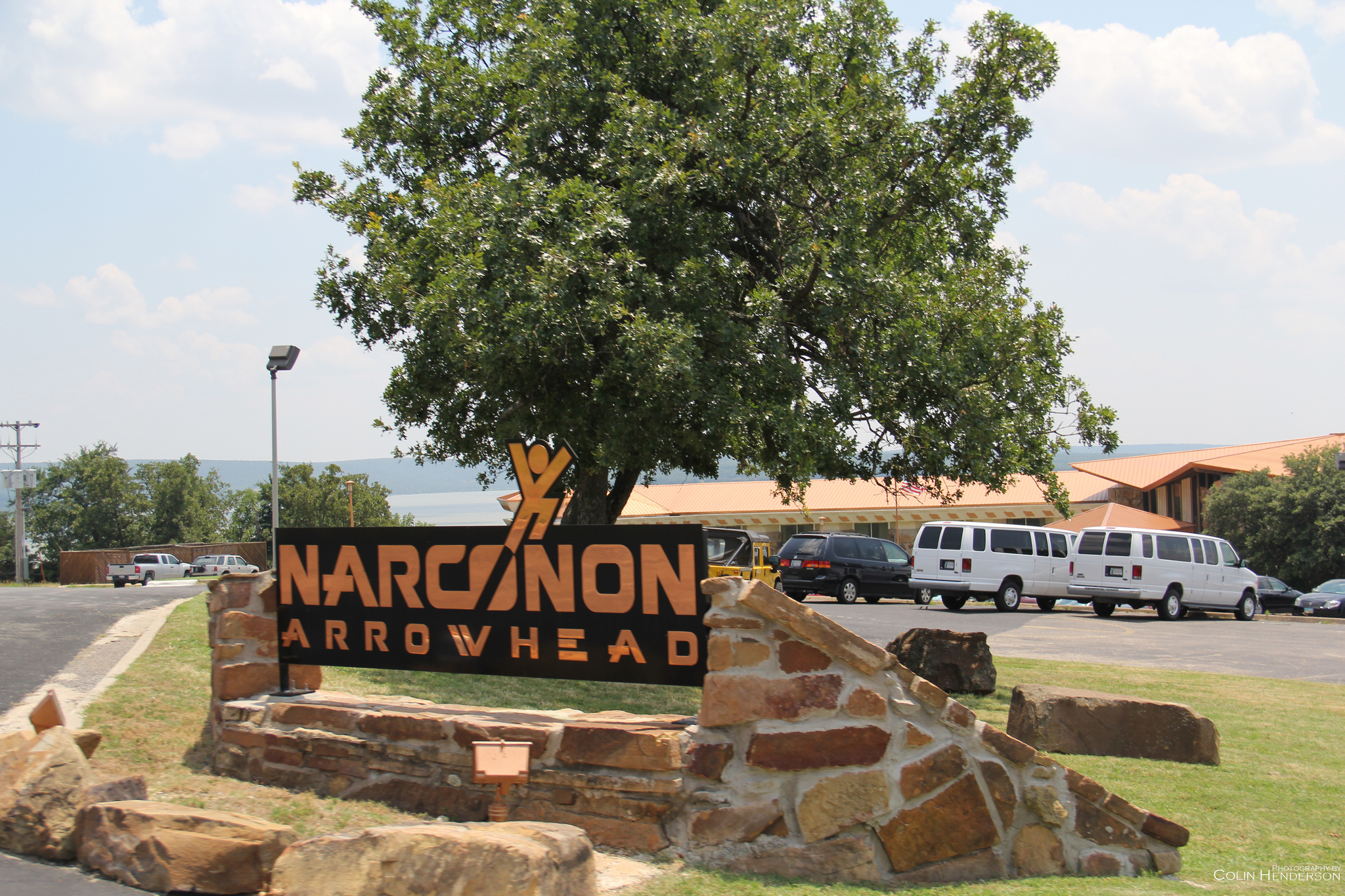
Narconon Arrowhead, Oklahoma, where various law enforcement agencies are investigating recent deaths.

In August 2012, Pittsburg County sheriffs and the Oklahoma Department of Mental Health (ODMHSAS), along with the Oklahoma State Bureau of Investigation (OSBI), began an investigation of deaths at Narconon Arrowhead following the deaths of three patients in a period of nine months.

The investigation included the recent deaths of four patients: Stacy Dawn Murphy, aged 20, who died at Narconon Arrowhead on 19 July 2012; Hillary Holten, 21, who was found dead at the facility on 11 April 2012; and 32-year-old Gabriel Graves, who died at the facility on 26 October 2011. The investigation later expanded to cover the death of 28-year-old Kaysie Dianne Werninck, who died at Narconon Arrowhead on 3 March 2009.

Following media attention surrounding the deaths, the National Association of Forensic Counselors (NAFC) permanently revoked the Certified Chemical Dependency Counseling certification of several Narconon Arrowhead employees, including director Gary Smith. In August 2013, the ODMHSAS permanently revoked the facility's permit for medical detoxification after Narconon had exhausted all avenues for protesting the decision.

In August 2013, Inspector General Kim Poff and investigator Michael DeLong, both of the ODMHSAS, who had been investigating the deaths at Narconon Arrowhead, had their employment terminated. No reason was given for the termination, but the investigators' attorney later claimed that the two were wrongfully fired, saying: "Their termination, in part, relates to the Narconon investigation".

==== Kaysie Dianne Werninck (2009) ====
Kaysie Dianne Werninck died at Narconon Arrowhead on 3 March 2009. Her parents filed a lawsuit against the center claiming her death was "a result of the defendant's gross negligence". The case was settled.

==== Gabriel Graves (2011) ====
Gabriel Graves, who died at the facility in October 2011, was the subject of an open records request made to the ODMHSAS by the Tulsa World newspaper, which revealed reports of use and distribution of drugs at the facility. Graves' autopsy recorded his cause of death as "unknown".

==== Hillary Holten (2012) ====
Hillary Holten died on April 11, 2012. Her parents filed a lawsuit against Narconon Arrowhead, and alleged Hillary had died due to lack of medical care. Their lawsuit states that she "had a history of Congenital Adrenal Hyperplasia, a condition that required the daily administration of Dexamethasone and in extreme circumstances, an injection of liquid cortisone", and that Narconon Arrowhead did not properly manage her condition. Gary Smith of Narconon refrained from comment, adding that "there are federal rights to privacy laws which prohibit us from discussing anything about former clients."

==== Stacy Dawn Murphy (2012) ====
Stacy Dawn Murphy died on July 20, 2012 at Narconon Arrowhead. Stacy's father said Narconon officials told him that, when his daughter was found dead alone in the "detox" room, she had not been checked on for two and a half hours. "That's too long, if they thought she was overdosed, why didn't they have someone with her the whole time?" he said, adding, "We sent her there to get better, not to die". Gary Smith responded in an email statement that, "It is always deeply saddening when drug addiction takes a life or destroys a family. ... For the family the pain of losing a loved one to addiction is unimaginable."

A patient who was resident at Narconon Arrowhead at the time of Stacy's death said, "There was no doctor there, no nurse on staff. There's nothing like that there ... The staff, they're all former patients. ... My understanding is that everyone there is pretty much a former patient. ... The drugs that would have saved Stacy's life were either not available or no one there knew how to administer it." Now told reporters that he feared retaliation by Narconon for talking to the police and media: "I'm afraid for my life." Stacy's roommate, Destanie Ramsey, called police on the night of her death in order to leave Narconon Arrowhead, where she claimed she was being held against her will.

==== Public and media response ====
Protests over the deaths took place outside Narconon Arrowhead; one protest in late June 2012, planned to include bereaved family members, was disrupted by road resurfacing works outside the facility, paid for by Narconon. Pittsburg County Commission Chairman Gene Rogers explained that, "[Gary Smith] called me and said they might be having a problem with the public that weekend and he wanted help policing the area and he asked about doing overlaying [of the road]".

Oklahoma State Senator Tom Ivester commented that, "Clearly something isn't right and we have a moral obligation to do everything in our power to end this predatory business being run by the Church of Scientology disguised as drug treatment", adding, "This is a disgusting business that preys on desperate family members and their sick loved ones, scamming them out of thousands of dollars with the promise of providing hope and new life. It's a disgrace to have these people operating in the state of Oklahoma." In direct response to the Arrowhead deaths, Ivestor introduced legislation to expand Oklahoma's ability to regulate rehab facilities.

In response to an NBC Rock Center segment on the facility, Narconon President Clark Carr called its criticism of Narconon "bigoted" and described the program as addicts' "last chance for a decent, honest, drug-free life".

== Controversies ==
=== State code violations ===
Narconon facilities in California have been cited repeatedly for violations by state inspectors. Violations included administering medication without authorization, having alcohol on the premises, and not having proper bedding for patients. Narconon has also attempted to silence opposition, including sending letters to neighbors of a proposed facility in Leona Valley threatening legal action for criticism. Residents had been concerned that Narconon would increase crime. The local town council recommended an eight-foot security fence and independent security, which was objected to by Narconon officials.

=== Narconon Chilocco licensing problems ===
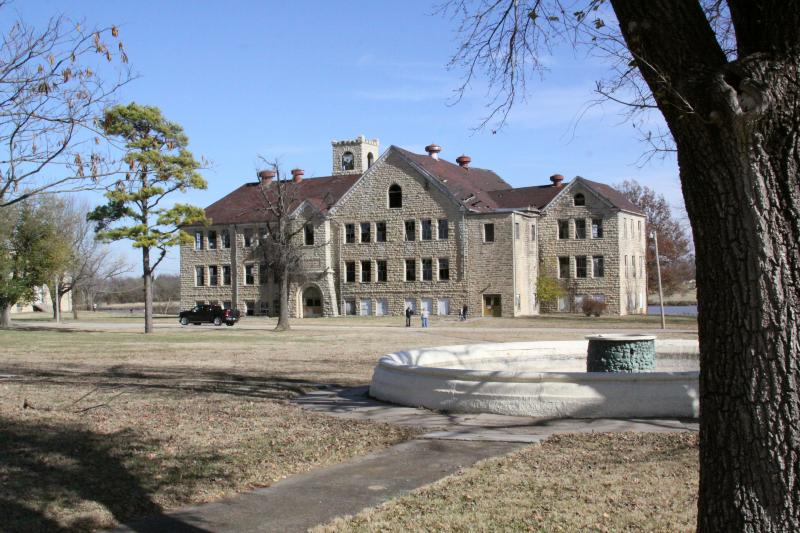
Narconon's first presence in the state of Oklahoma was at the Chilocco Indian Agricultural School, near Newkirk. Narconon made the argument that operating on an Indian reservation obviated the need for a state license.

Narconon began operations in Oklahoma in 1990, as an unlicensed facility on the site of the Chilocco Indian Agricultural School near the town of Newkirk, claiming that it did not require a state license as it was operating on an Indian reservation. In 1992 Narconon applied for a state licence, and was twice refused by the ODMHSAS, which found "no evidence that drug and alcohol abuse education was part of the program" and declared the program "not medically safe", a decision to which Narconon spokesperson Kirstie Alley responded, "The arrogance and irresponsibility of the mental health board will not survive the outrage of the many thousands of parents, graduates and supporters from the scientific community".

Between 1989 and 1992, Narconon, through Scientology attorney Tim Bowles, filed lawsuits against the ODMHSAS; its members; and local newspaper editor Robert Lobsinger, who had written about Narconon's Scientology connection. Narconon contacted the Mayor of Newkirk's 12-year-old son at a library, and hired private detectives to research Narconon's opponents, leading residents to fear retribution if they spoke out against the organization. A Narconon spokesman quoted by The New York Times described Narconon's critics in Newkirk as "in favor of drug abuse... They're either connected to selling drugs or they're using drugs."

Narconon achieved exemption from the requirement for state licensing in 1992, as a result of approval from the Commission on Accreditation of Rehabilitation Facilities. Scientology leader David Miscavige commented on the case in an interview with ABC News Nightline, saying, "There are a group of people on this planet who find us to be a threat to their existence, and they will do everything in their power to stop us. And that is the mental health field. I didn't pick a war with them."

In 2012, a paid advert in the Oklahoma Gazette contained allegations from a previously unknown group named "Oklahomans for the preservation of homeland security and american values, (ohsav)" [sic]. The advert referred to recent TV news stories about Narconon and Scientology, named some of Narconon's critics in Oklahoma, and alleged those critics had "subjugated [their] individuality for [their] own thirst for hatred", had an "agenda of religious intolerance, racial discrimination or disdain for corporate America", and blamed them for "public disinformation hate campaigns against Blacks, Jews, Muslims and Scientologists". The advertisement showed the characteristics of a dead agenting campaign.

=== Investigation in Russia ===
In April 2007, it was revealed that the public procurator in Moscow's South District had begun an investigation into Narconon's activities in Russia. The Moskovskij Komsomolets newspaper reported that legal proceedings were begun against the head of the clinic "Narconon-Standard" for violating bans in Russian medical practices. Russian law enforcement became interested after receiving many complaints from citizens about the high fees charged by Narconon. The Narconon office in Bolshaya Tulskaya St. was searched, and documents and unidentified medications were seized. One year later, as part of an investigation in Ulyanovsk into the Church of Scientology, police searched a Narconon office in the town of Dimitrovgrad.

=== Narconon Trois-Rivières closed by Quebec health authorities ===
[Narconon] may represent a risk to health

— Health and Social Services Agency, Mauricie Region, Quebec

On 17 April 2012, Quebec health officials ordered the Narconon facility in Trois-Rivières to close, and to relocate its 32 residents. After an investigation into Narconon Trois-Rivières' activities by the Centre Québécois d'Agrément (CQA), an independent body that monitors the quality of healthcare, the Mauricie Region's Health and Social Services Agency decided not to re-certify Narconon due to concerns that its methods "may represent a risk to health" of patients.

The Agency's director, Marc Latour, said that Narconon Trois-Rivières was dangerous for patients, that it violated many of the criteria governing rehabilitation centres in Quebec, and that there was no medical supervision and no scientific basis to its treatment. He added that at least four clients had been hospitalized in recent months because of methods used at the centre. Narconon Trois-Rivières issued a response, saying, "People with drug problems and their families should have a right to choose the program that works for them as these days there are many good alternative programs".

The closure followed a two-year campaign by ex-Narconon patient and staff member David Love, whose negative experiences with the program prompted him to become one of its fiercest critics in Canada. While he was at Narconon Trois-Rivieres, Love reports that:

staff members withheld insulin from a diabetic patient undergoing the sauna treatment. That young man ended up in hospital for three days, Love said. In another [incident], [Narconon] took away a patient's antidepressants. He jumped from a second-floor window in a suicide attempt.

Love is one of five former Narconon patients who have filed a complaint with Quebec's Human Rights Commission, alleging that their drug addiction was exploited by Narconon, which recruited them into the program and made them perform manual labour while taking part in it. Love also alleges that Narconon Trois-Rivieres earned around $16 million for Scientology between its opening in 2005 and its forced closure in 2012.

Narconon President Clark Carr stated that the facility closed because the province changed its stance on "what kind of drug rehabilitation it would tolerate" to "strictly medical, drug substitution, and so forth". Narconon was informed that it had to reacquire a license, but would only be approved if its method of treatment was changed.

=== Pur Detox suicide attempt ===
In September 2012, Pur Detox, a Narconon offshoot, was sued in Orange County, California, for negligence, medical malpractice, and negligent supervision. William Sweeney, the plaintiff, "suffered severe personal injuries" after a suicide attempt, jumping from a third floor balcony at the clinic, in Dana Point. Sweeney's complaint alleges that he was taken off his prescribed psychiatric medication at the facility, and that it was this which led to his suicide attempt.

=== Arrest of Heber Jentzsch ===
In December 1988, the president of the Church of Scientology International, Heber Jentzsch, was arrested in Spain after an investigation into Narconon that resulted in (later dropped) allegations that he and Scientology were defrauding Spanish citizens and running its centers with unqualified staff. The judge in the case said at a news conference after the arrests that the only god of Scientology was money, and compared the church to a pyramid scheme in which members pay increasing sums of money. The judge said that Narconon swindled its clients and lured them into Scientology. By the end of 1991, the Spanish court found there was no evidence to support prosecutors' allegations that drug rehabilitation and other programs sponsored by Scientology in Spain amounted to illicit gatherings aimed at activities such as fraud. In April 2002, the charge was formally dropped. The court also ordered that the bail bond deposited for Jentzsch's release in 1988 be returned to Scientology along with interest, which nearly doubled the original amount.

=== Slatkin fraud ===
On 8 November 2006, the Associated Press reported that Narconon was one of the Scientology groups that would pay back a total of $3.5 million of illegal funds from EarthLink co-founder Reed Slatkin:

Slatkin, who was once an ordained Scientology minister, paid $1.7 million from his scheme directly to Scientology groups, while millions of dollars more were funneled through other investors to groups affiliated with the church, bankruptcy trustee R. Todd Neilson said in court filings. Among the church groups to receive ill-gotten gains from Slatkin's scheme were Narconon International, the Church of Scientology Celebrity Centre International and the Church of Scientology Western United States, the filings said. The $3.5 million being returned by the church groups was the result of a negotiated compromise, Scientology attorney David Schindler and Alexander Pilmer, an attorney for Neilson, said.

=== Head of Narconon deported from Kazakhstan ===
In July 2008, the head of Narconon in Kazakhstan was deported: Kazakh Justice Minister Zagipa Baliyeva announced that "foreigners from the USA, Georgia, South Korea and Japan have been deported from the country by law-enforcement agencies and in line with court rulings for violating the rules regarding the stay of foreigners and carrying out missionary activities without registration. In particular, with a further ban on entering Kazakhstan for five years, the head of the Narconon public foundation affiliated with the Church of Scientology has been deported," adding, "27 cases were uncovered where heads of non-traditional religious organizations violated the law on the freedom of conscience and religious organizations; in particular, materials propagating radical ideas and teachings of non-traditional religions were seized from them".

=== Accusation of website graphics design/layout plagiarism ===
In January 2001, Narconon came under fire when they appeared to plagiarize the entire layout and site design of the webzine Urban75.com for their websites heroinaddiction.com and cocaineaddiction.com, among others. The editor of Urban75 posted up comparisons of the copying, showing that Narconon had not even removed Urban75's hidden JavaScript code, unique to Urban75. The Register noted the irony of this scandal, quoting a critic who wrote, "Scientology has sued countless individuals and organizations putatively [sic] for 'copyright violation' and the organization claims loudly that they're at the 'forefront of protecting proprietary information on the Internet'."

=== Narconon Georgia closed amid investigation for insurance fraud ===
In April 2013, agents of the insurance commissioner of the U.S. state of Georgia and the Gwinnett County district attorney's office searched the group's offices in Norcross, Georgia, questioning employees as they arrived at work and impounding more than a dozen computers and boxes full of documents. The insurance commissioner said during the investigation that, "We have credible information that indicates that insurance fraud is taking place with Narconon". The family of one patient said that the group was billing insurance companies for treatments that had never been given, and the doctors for whom the costs were being billed claimed never to have met the patient.

State investigators discovered nearly $3 million of insurance fraud at Narconon Georgia; in September 2013, the facility surrendered its state license in order to avoid criminal charges.

== Lawsuits ==
=== California ===
In March 2014, attorney Ryan Hamilton filed two civil lawsuits against Narconon with the state of California.

The first civil suit was filed on behalf of Angelo Amato of Illinois, who purchased Narconon's Purification Rundown at Narconon Fresh Start (a.k.a. Sunshine Summit Lodge) in Warner Springs, after Amato searched the Internet for drug treatment facilities and believed claims by Scientology that purported to be from an "independent consultant" web site. Amato claims to have been defrauded of $31,000 and began the Narconon program only to discover that it was actually Scientology being practiced, alleging that no actual drug treatment was offered at the facility.

The second civil suit was filed on behalf of plaintiffs Christie Estrada and Branden Chavez of New Mexico, who also researched "drug treatment facilities" on the Internet and were allegedly deceived by Narconon Fresh Start in to paying $33,000 before the Purification Rundown process could be applied, with Narconon Fresh Start allegedly asking for $23,000 of that fee up front in cash. The defendants in this case are also Narconon Fresh Start.

The core plaintiff complaints cover a spectrum of allegations of criminal misconduct by Scientology that include insurance fraud, denial that Narconon is tied to Scientology, fraudulent claims that Narconon staff were medically trained in drug treatment, and a number of other deceptive claims.

=== Nevada ===
In February 2014, Hamilton filed an additional civil suit against Narconon with the state of Nevada. His clients, Michael Tarr and his mother Cathy, sued Narconon Fresh Start (doing business as Rainbow Canyon Retreat) for fraud, breach of contract and negligence. The Tarrs claimed that, while residing at Narconon to treat his former heroin addiction, Michael did not receive detoxification treatment but rather indoctrination into Scientology, and asked the court to award them punitive damages as well as a refund of Narconon's $33,000 fees and their legal expenses.

The Tarrs' civil suit followed closely behind a previous lawsuit filed by Hamilton on behalf of David, Stacy, and Jack Welch of Texas, who also allege that Narconon Fresh Start committed breach of contract, fraud, and negligence.

In April 2014, Hamilton filed another lawsuit against Narconon Nevada, this time on behalf of Harry and Lauren Geanacopulos and their son Peter. The Geanacopulos family's complaint argues that Narconon's programme content and success rate were misrepresented to them and that it has no genuine medical or scientific basis. Hamilton claimed to possess a Narconon internal document showing that the program was used as a "bridge" to introduce clients to Scientology.

=== National Association of Forensic Counselors ===
In May 2014, the NAFC filed a lawsuit in Oklahoma, naming Narconon, Scientology and eighty other defendants. The NAFC is a body that provides certification to drug abuse counsellors. The filing sought an injunction to prevent Narconon from using the NAFC's trademarks, certifications or logos; it also sought punitive damages.

The filing alleged that Narconon and the other defendants conspired to:

willfully misuse the NAFC logos and trademarks and falsified certifications supposedly obtained through the NAFC or the ACCFC to misrepresent the credentials of their employees and volunteers to promote the Narconon Network.

going on to claim that Narconon:

willfully misused (and continues to misuse) Plaintiff NAFC's logos, trademarks and false certifications to further the goals and purposes of the Church of Scientology International. Specifically, Plaintiffs claim that the misuse was calculated to increase the credibility of the Narconon Treatment Centers and the affiliated counselors, and to expand the reach and profitability of the Church of Scientology International to Plaintiffs' detriment.

=== Oklahoma ===
On 5 June 2014, one-time Narconon employee Eric Tenorio was issued a subpoena to appear before a multi-county grand jury in Oklahoma that was investigating alleged insurance fraud and credit card fraud being committed at Narconon Arrowhead. The grand jury is empowered to hand down state and federal indictments and to subpoena current and previous employees, agents, and operators of the facility.

The grand jury investigation of Narconon Arrowhead came shortly after Tenorino filed documentation with the state of Oklahoma and with the NAFC, which resulted in NAFC filing their own civil lawsuits against 82 named defendants working for Narconon.

=== Colorado ===
At the Scientology facility in Fort Collins, Colorado, operating under the name "A Life Worth Living", there have been numerous law enforcement call-outs, medical emergencies, and other related requests for emergency services reported under a Freedom of Information Act request made available to the public on the Scribd document server, detailing numerous recorded incidents of Scientology operatives refusing to allow patents to leave, refusing to return their property, and patients making 9-1-1 calls that are interrupted by Scientology operatives.

== Spin-offs and related groups ==
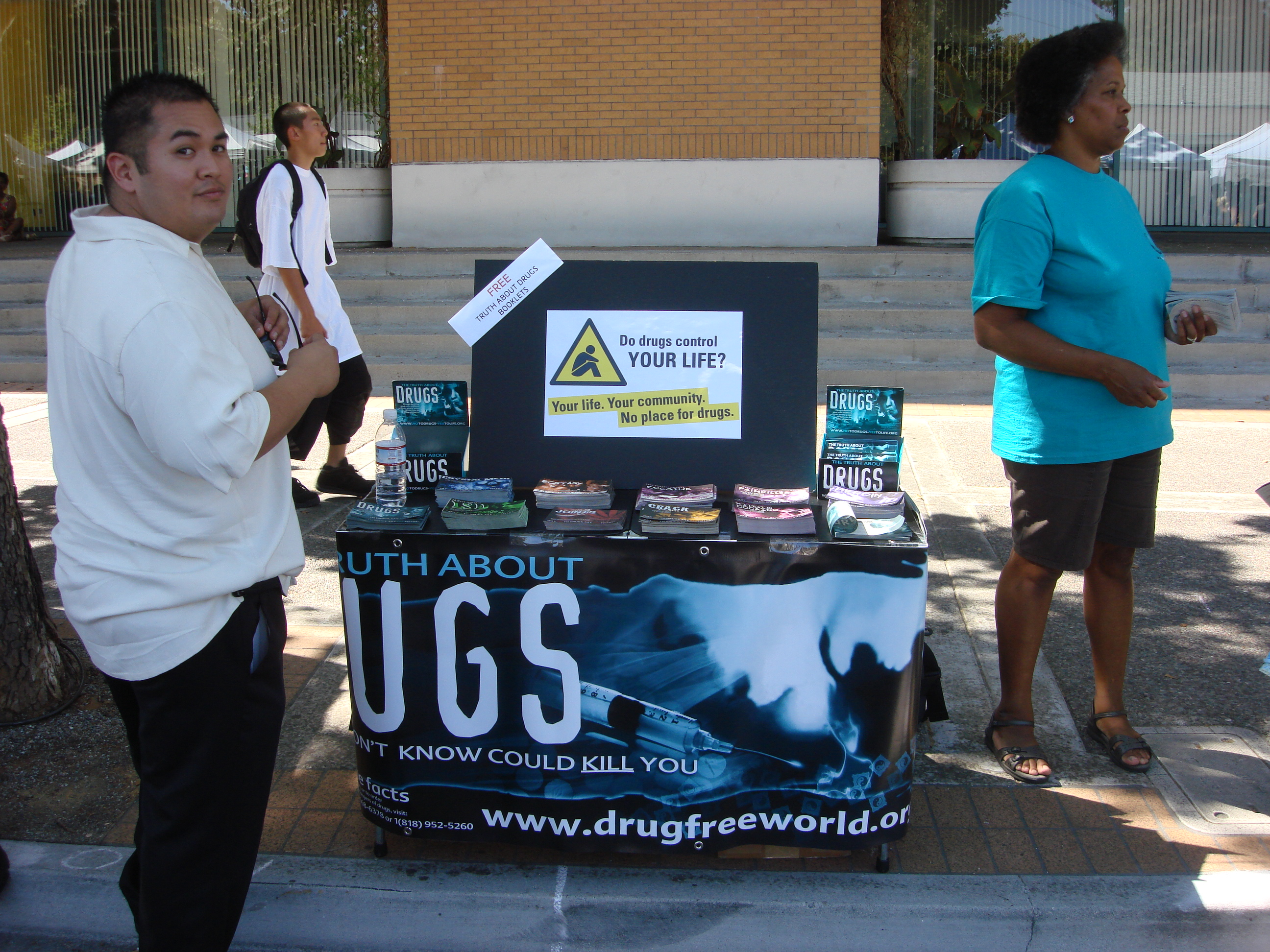
Stall for 'The Truth About Drugs', one of the names under which Narconon and Scientology market their programs.

Narconon also operates and markets drug rehabilitation facilities under other names, partly to hide that they are part of Scientology. There are also other Scientology-affiliated drug rehabilitation groups that are based on the Purification Rundown.

- Blu by the Sea in Emerald Coast, Florida, is the name of the former Narconon Gulf Coast.
- Droganon was active in Spain in the 1980s and was controlled by Scientology.
- Drug Free Ambassadors is a Narconon program targeting schools and youth organizations.
- Elevate Addiction Services, a group of clinics formerly operating under the name Narconon of Northern California, broke away from Narconon in 2014/2015 after an arbitration where they agreed to no longer use the sauna and vitamin method or teach Narconon/Church of Scientology programs, and would no longer be licensed by Narconon. The name was changed to Halcyon Horizons and several other entities operating under the trade name of Elevate Addiction Services. Still owned by the same Scientologists and using much of the earlier faculty, similar practices are in use.
- Fresh Start is a pseudonym sometimes used by Narconon's facility in Nevada.
- Get Off Drugs Naturally is a business name for Narconon's Australian branch.
- Israel Says No to Drugs is a Scientology-affiliated organization based in Jaffa, Israel.
- Pur Detox (also Pür Detox with an umlaut) is a Scientology-affiliated clinic in Dana Point, California. The clinic has come under scrutiny due to a lawsuit by one of the former patients. The Church of Scientology was not a party to the lawsuit.
- Rainbow Canyon Rehabilitation Center, Rainbow Canyon Retreat or just Rainbow Canyon is a Narconon center in Caliente, Nevada.
- Say No to Drugs Say Yes To Life or Yes to Life, No to Drugs is a front group for Narconon and Scientology, organizing races and street festivals to support Narconon.
- Sober Living in Orange County is the Purification Rundown operated at the Orange County Scientology Org itself.
- Suncoast Rehabilitation Center is a trade name or subsidiary of Narconon Spring Hill Inc., Florida. The center has come under scrutiny from the local authorities for their patient housing. The nearby Novus Medical Detox Center, while not directly affiliated to Scientology, is operated by the landlord of the Suncoast center.
- Teen-anon or Streetcats is a Narconon program at the Narconon Vista Bay facility.
- The Truth About Drugs and Foundation for a Drug-Free World are slogans under which Scientology and Narconon advertise their programs while concealing their Scientology origins.

Though not directly linked to Narconon, the New York Rescue Workers Detoxification Project and Second Chance Program are both Scientology-affiliated and also use the Purification Rundown.

== See also ==
- Association for Better Living and Education
- Clear Body, Clear Mind
- Criminon
- Scientology front groups
- New York Rescue Workers Detoxification Project
- Purification Rundown
- Second Chance Program
- Synanon
