= Erie County Holding Center =

Pre-trial, maximum security detention facility in New York, US

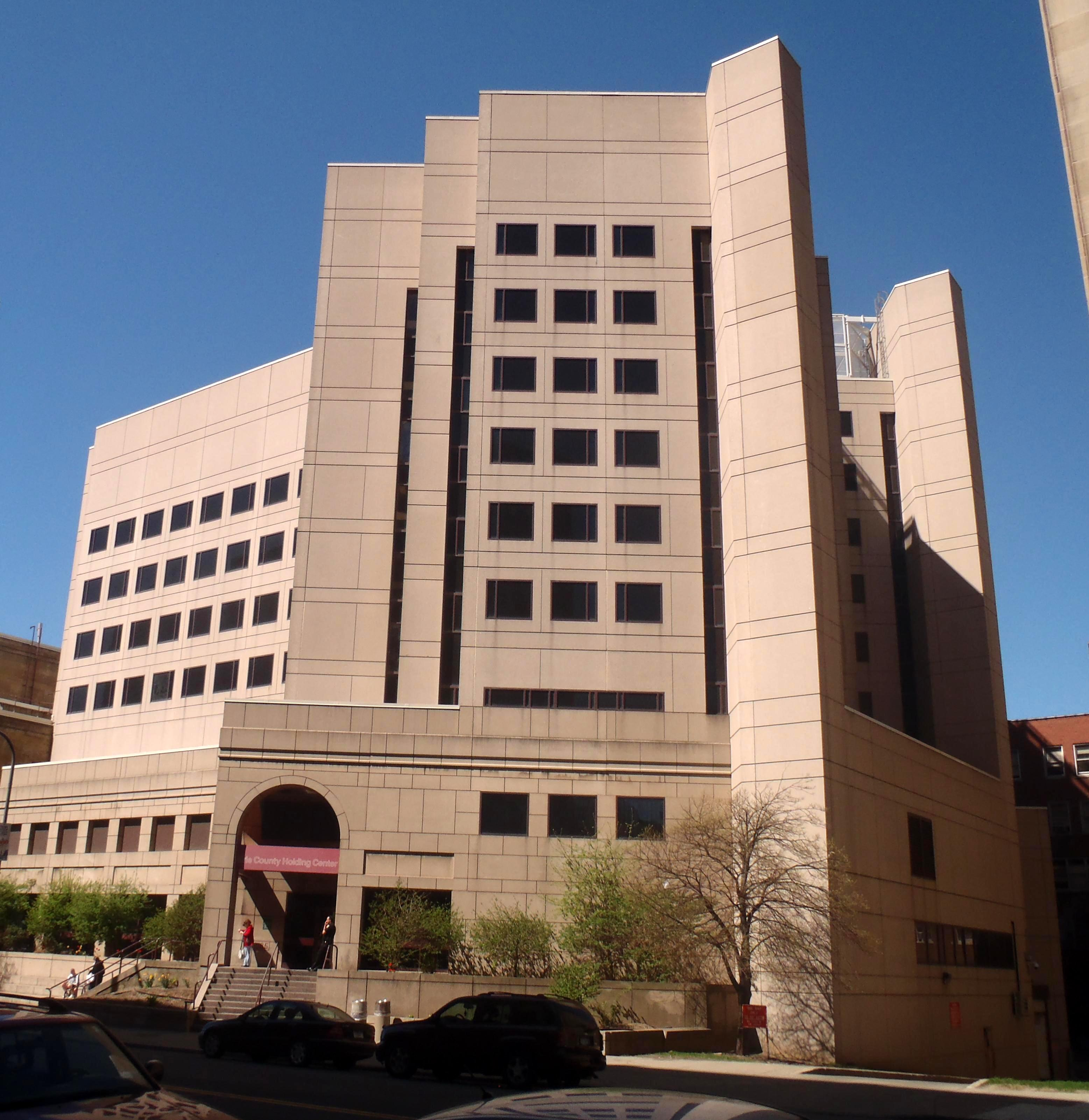
- Interactive map of Erie County Holding Center
- Location: Buffalo, New York; 42.885°N 78.879722°W
- Status: Operational
- Security class: Maximum
- Capacity: 680
- Opened: 1938
- Managed by: Erie County Sheriff's Office

The Erie County Holding Center in Buffalo, New York is a pre-trial, maximum security detention facility that serves Erie County. Capable of housing 680 inmates, it is the second largest detention facility in New York State outside of New York City. Inmate "Over-flow" is housed at the Holding Center Annex at the Erie County Correctional Facility in Alden, New York. The Jail Management Division of the Erie County Sheriff's Office conducts regularly scheduled tours of the facility for high school and college student groups, police academy classes and groups of "At risk" teens. The ECHC is staffed by approximately 500 Deputies whom are sworn police officers. There are currently two operational k9 narcotics detection teams among them. The ECHC houses many high profile criminals and frequently has to deploy QET (quick entry team) to quell inmate disturbances and emergency situations.

== Complaints ==
According to a professor at University at Buffalo Law School, "Erie County continues to operate the Holding Center with indifference to the basic medical needs of inmates."

The suicide rate at the Holding Center has brought it unwanted attention. The Erie County Prisoners Rights Coalition demonstrates in front of the Center each Wednesday.
