= Scientology front groups =

Organizations pretending to be not-Scientology

Scientology front groups are organizations named or operated in such a way as to disguise their association with the Church of Scientology. The Church uses front groups as a public relations tool, to introduce its ideas and techniques into society by presenting a neutral or secular face to gain access to audiences that would reject Scientology branding. These groups are also used to recruit new members, and to advance the Church's political interests. Time magazine reported that the Church attracts "the unwary through a wide array of front groups in such businesses as publishing, consulting, health care and even remedial education." Many of the groups are founded on pseudoscience, named disingenuously, and underplay their links to Scientology and L. Ron Hubbard.

== Overview ==
There are four types of front groups:

1. those groups which are part of the Scientology network of corporations and are managed directly within the Church of Scientology but bear names disguising the connection,
2. those operated under "secular" subsidiary corporations but still managed or overseen within the Church of Scientology,
3. groups or projects made up of volunteer Scientologists while still overseen and guided by the organization, and
4. companies owned by Scientologists and operated using Scientology principles of management and administration under licenses from Scientology.

According to Benjamin Beit-Hallahmi, "The majority of activities conducted by Scientology and its many fronts and subsidiaries involve the marketing of secular products such as the "Clear" program, Sterling Management Systems executive training, and self-improvement in scholastics." Some Scientology products are defined as religious in one setting but secular in another. For example, Study Technology is sold in Churches of Scientology but is also taught in some schools under claims of being secular and non-religious.

Scientology is unique among religions for its quantity of front groups, which has been part of its policy since its beginnings and was outlined by Hubbard in his 1960 document "Special Zone Plan". Along with their own front groups, Scientology engages in infiltration of civil society groups and government agencies. Their front businesses are a major source of income for Scientology and are used as a way of obtaining funds from government and charity sources. Per Beit-Hallahmi, "This use of fronts has been a major part of the organization's activities, and it indicates an acknowledgement of having something (or more than just something) to hide."

In 1974, Mary Sue Hubbard, who ran the Guardian's Office, wrote that "Scientology must avoid being labeled a political group", and that the solution was for "all political activity to be carried on via front groups".

== History ==
Documents obtained in the FBI's 1977 raids on Scientology's Los Angeles and Washington DC premises included an undated memo entitled "PR General Categories of Data Needing Coding". This memo listed what it called "Secret PR Front Groups" which included the group Alliance for the Preservation of Religious Liberty (APRL), later renamed Americans Preserving Religious Liberty.

In 1991, Time investigative reporting identified several other fronts for Scientology, including the Citizens Commission on Human Rights (CCHR), The Way to Happiness Foundation, Applied Scholastics, the Concerned Businessmen's Association of America and HealthMed. Their article The Thriving Cult of Greed and Power resulted in years of litigation. The case was dismissed, but not before Time had spent $3.7 million in legal fees.

The Cult Awareness Network (CAN) was an organization that provided information on cults, receiving the most number of inquiries about Scientology and one other group. CAN, founded in 1978, considered Scientology to be "the most dangerous, rapacious, and destructive cult in contemporary America". In 1996, CAN was forced into bankruptcy by a series of frivolous lawsuits orchestrated by the Church of Scientology. In a bizarre twist, the Church of Scientology acquired CAN's assets including files on Scientology, and re-opened CAN under Scientologist leadership, becoming a front group for Scientology.

In 1998, the Boston Herald identified Narconon and the World Literacy Crusade as front groups for Scientology. Other Scientology groups include Downtown Medical, Criminon and the Association for Better Living and Education (ABLE). Other organisations with links to the Church of Scientology include EarthLink and Striker Systems.

== List of Scientology front groups ==
- ALERT International Inc. (est. 1986)
- All Faiths Network (est. 2011) (Note: All Faiths Network was established in 2011, renamed in 2012, and Martin Weightman has been Director since 2012. He is a Scientologist of 40 years, 33 of which were spent on staff, who has reached OTVII and is in the Sea Org. For more than 15 years, up until 2007, he was Managing Director of the Church of Scientology's European Human Rights Office in Brussels, Belgium (1990-2007). He authored a published chapter in 2020, which ties All Faiths Network to Scientology.)
- Alliance for the Preservation of Religious Liberty (est. 1977)
- American Citizens for Honesty in Government
- American Conference on Religious Movements
- American Society for Disaster Relief (est. before 1960)
- Americans Preserving Religious Liberty
- Applied Scholastics (APS) (est. 1972)
- Association for Better Living and Education (ABLE) (est. 1988)
- Association for Health Development and Aid
- Author Services, Inc. (est. 1981) Merged into Galaxy Press, Inc. in 2015
- BigotWatch (est. 2000)
- Bridge Publications (est. 1981)
- Citizens Commission on Human Rights (CCHR) (est. 1969)
- Citizens for an Alternative Tax System (CATS) (est. 1990)
- Citizens for Social Reform (CSRPAC) (est. 2001)
- Citizens' Press Association
- Committee for a Safe Environment
- Committee on Public Health and Safety (COPHS)
- Computer Ethics Institute (CEI)
- Concerned Businessmen's Association of America (CBAA) (est. 1983). Renamed as Set a Good Example Foundation in 2007.
- Constitutional Administration Party (est. < 1960)
- Criminon (est. 2000)
- Distribution Center Inc. (est. c. 1958)
- Drug Free Ambassadors (est. 1993)
- Drug Free Marshals (est. 1993)
- Education Alive
- Effective Education Association
- Foundation for a Drug-Free World (FDFW) (est. 2006)
- Foundation for Religious Freedom (est. 1997)
- Foundation for Religious Tolerance of Florida (est. 2001)
- The Freudian Foundation of America (est. 1954)
- Friends of Freedom (est. 1990)
- Hubbard College of Administration (est. 1990)
- International Executive Technology Inc.
- International Foundation for Human Rights and Tolerance (est. 1997)
- International Hubbard Ecclesiastical League of Pastors (IHELP) (est. 1982)
- Jewish Coalition for Religious Freedom
- Lead the Way to a Drug Free USA
- Narcodex (est. 2006)
- Narconon (est. 1966)
- National Academy of American Psychology (est. 1957)
- National Association for Rights Protection and Advocacy (NARPA)
- National Commission on Law Enforcement and Social Justice (est. 1989)
- New Cult Awareness Network (CAN) (est. 1996)
- Religious Freedom Watch (RFW) (est. 2001)
- Religious Research Foundation (RRF)
- Rock for Human Rights
- Safe Environment Fund (est. 1978)
- Scientologists Taking Action Against Discrimination (STAND)
- Second Chance Program (est. 1995)
- Set A Good Example Foundation (SAGE) (est. 1981) Formerly Concerned Businessmen's Association of America.
- Social Coordination International
- Society of Consulting Ministers (est. before 1960)
- Stop Torture of Mental Patients (STOMP)
- The Way to Happiness Foundation (TWTH) (est. 1984)
- United for Human Rights (est. 2005)
- World Institute of Scientology Enterprises (WISE) (est. 1979)
- World Literacy Crusade (est. 1992)
- Writers of the Future (WOTF) (est. 1985)
- Youth for Human Rights International (YHRI) (est. 2001)

== Licensed commercial organizations ==
The following commercial groups have as their goal either recruitment to make new Scientologists, or the spreading of L. Ron Hubbard principles and methods into society. The groups vary in the amount of disclosure they provide to the general public about their affiliation with Scientology or Hubbard. These organizations are licensed to sell "secular" Scientology products and services.

- APPLE Schools (est. 1970's)
- Cardone Training Technologies
- Delphi Schools
- Downtown Medical (est. 2003) (Note: Downtown Medical, Foundation for Advancements in Science and Education, HealthMed, International Academy of Detoxification Specialists, International Association of Detoxification Specialists, and New York Rescue Workers Detoxification Project are interrelated.)
- Foundation for Advancements in Science and Education (FASE) (est. 1981)
- HealthMed
- Hollander Consultants (est. 1983), also known as Silkin Management
- International Academy of Detoxification Specialists (est. 1999) Operated under Association for Better Living and Education.
- International Association of Detoxification Specialists
- Irons Marcus & Valko Services (est. 1995)
- Mace-Kingsley Ranch School and Mace-Kingsley Family Center (est. 1987)
- MGE Manangement Group
- Mojave Academy (est. 1999)
- New York Rescue Workers Detoxification Project (est. 2003)
- Pur Detox and Recovery
- Silkin Management, also known as Hollander Consultants (est. 1983)
- Sterling Management (est. 1983)
- Survival Strategies Inc.
- U-Man International
