= New Village Leadership Academy =

Coordinates: 34.138571°N 118.701314°W

- Logo of organization
- 23679 Calabasas Road, Suite 414; Calabasas, California; United States

Information
- Type: Private
- Motto: Spiral Up! (motto)
- Established: 2008
- Closed: June 28, 2013
- Grades: Pre-kindergarten - Grade 6
- Head of School: Piano Foster
- Website: nvlacademy.org

New Village Leadership Academy (NVLA) was a private elementary school located in Calabasas, California, USA. Indian Hills High School previously used the campus, and in 2008 actor Will Smith funded New Village Leadership Academy and leased the Calabasas facilities for three years.

Smith and his wife Jada Pinkett Smith selected the management for the school. Educational methodologies used by the school include Study Technology, Montessori education, Gardner, and Bruner methods.

The school closed on June 28, 2013.

== Funding ==
The school's campus was formerly used by Indian Hills High School, which relocated to Agoura High School in Agoura Hills, California to save money. In 2008, actor Will Smith paid US$890,000 to lease the Calabasas campus for three years, restructuring it from a high school to a private elementary school called New Village Academy. The school is located close to Will Smith's home in Calabasas.

Prior to New Village Leadership Academy, Smith and Pinkett Smith's two children were home-schooled by their mother. The school was founded by the Smiths, who say they are not Scientologists, in 2005 as a home school for their younger children and those of several other families. Smith and his wife installed their current director of philanthropy, Jana Babatunde-Bey, as the executive director of the school and Jacqueline Olivier as Head of School.

In an appearance on Live with Regis and Kelly Will Smith commented on the educational methodologies used by the school: "There are just very powerful educational concepts that we believe in, and we feel like we want to design the system that revolutionizes public education." "New Village Academy was born of a simple question, 'Is it possible to create an educational environment in which children have fun learning?' Jada and I believe the answer is 'Yes.'", said Smith in a released statement.

A spokesperson for Will Smith told The Guardian: "Will is leasing the campus for three years, plus he'll cover all costs such as utilities. The academy will be run privately, and will include pre-kindergarten through grade six." New Village Academy's Calabasas facilities opened in 2008. In March 2009 the Associated Press reported that Jada Pinkett-Smith planned to open a companion high-school. Federal tax filing showed that Will Smith donated $1.2 million to the school in 2010.

== Teaching and staff ==
Educational methodologies used by the school included Montessori, Gardner, Jerome Bruner, and Study Technology. Subjects included in the school's curriculum include mathematics, literacy, Spanish, karate, yoga, robotics, technology, etiquette, art, and living skills. New Village Academy served organic meals to students, and laptops were made available to all students. The school encouraged parental involvement and restricted access to television. Tuition was approximately $22,500 per year to attend the school, and 80% of the students would receive financial assistance.

=== Scientology ties ===
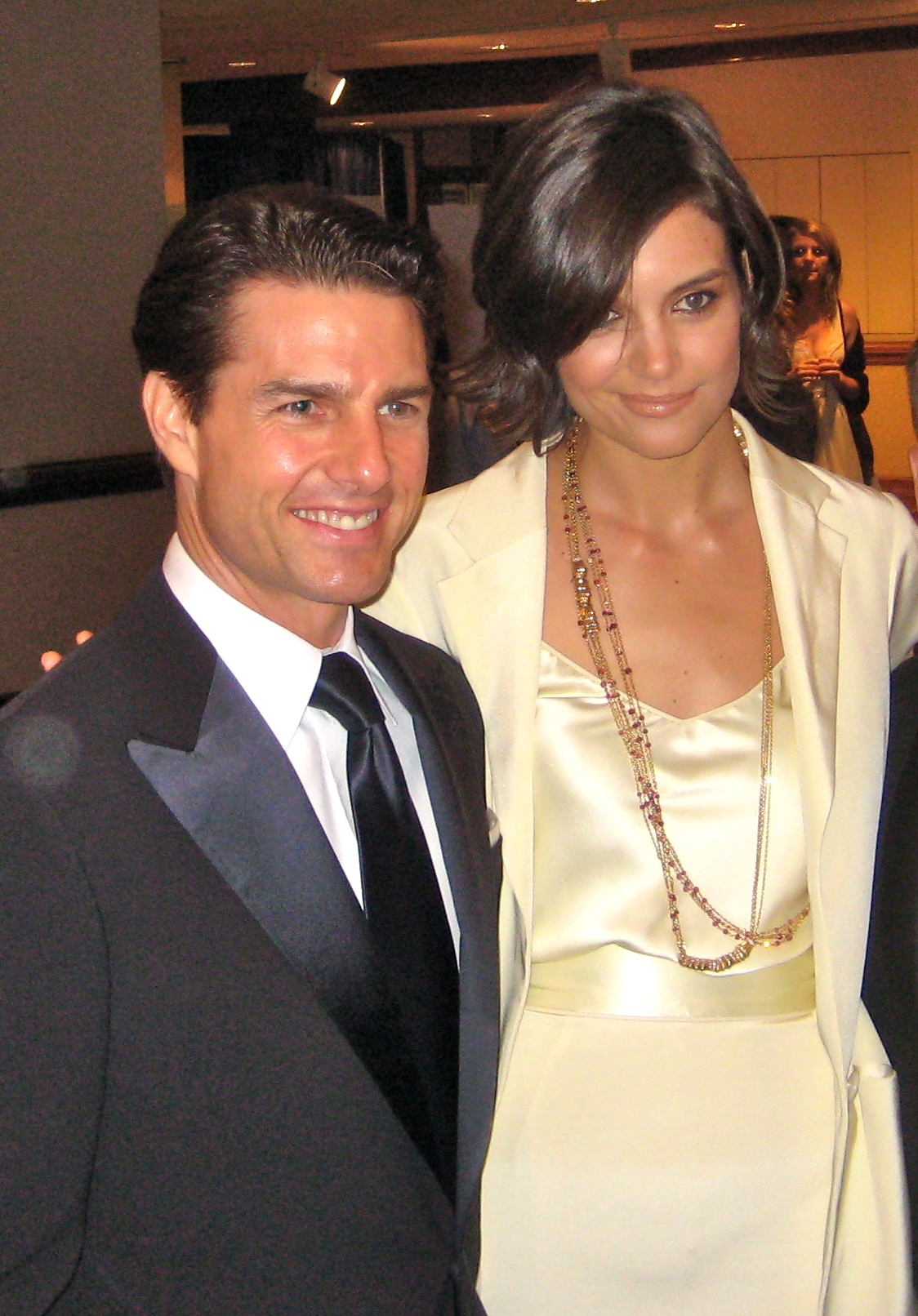
Tom Cruise and Katie Holmes' daughter Suri attended the school from 2009

The staff includes a number of Scientologists, including the Director of Learning, Director of Qualifications and artistic director, as well as some of the school's teachers. New Village Academy's Director of Learning, formerly the director of HELP in Boston, graduated from the Scientology Delphi School in Milton, Massachusetts. The school's website lists "Study Technology", a form of education developed by Church of Scientology founder L. Ron Hubbard, as one of its methodologies. The website utilizes Scientology terminology including "spiraling" and "gradient" in order to illustrate how students learn in the school's programs.

The school's motto "Spiral Up" has been compared to Scientology's term "dwindling spiral", when "one commits overt acts unwittingly", although "spiral curriculum" is also a term associated with Jerome Bruner. When a student needs to be disciplined they are taken to the "ethics teacher". Jada Pinkett Smith told ABC News, "Study Technology is a secular methodology intended to help students better understand what is being studied and apply it to real life. NVLA integrates this methodology as a tool in instructional design by providing teachers the framework to design lessons and curriculum."

In response to reports of Scientology ties in 2008, Jacqueline Olivier who was administrator at the time, denied that the school had a religious affiliation, and told the Los Angeles Times: "People tend to think Study Technology is a subject, but it is really just the way the subject is taught. They then come to the conclusion that we are teaching Scientology when actually a methodology doesn't have anything to do with content."

Olivier was appointed administrator at the school in 2007, her duties have included hiring all teachers since that time. She said that in addition to Scientologists the school also has Muslim, Christian and Jewish staff members, and said: "We are a secular school." "Faculty and staff do not promote their own religions at school." Children from all religious backgrounds will be accepted at the school.

Professor of computer science at Carnegie Mellon University and Scientology critic David S. Touretzky was critical of the school's use of Study Technology, and told the Los Angeles Times: "There is no reputable educator anywhere who endorses Study Technology. What happens is that children are inculcated with Scientology jargon and are led to regard L.R. Hubbard as an authority figure. They are laying the groundwork for later bringing people into Scientology."

Touretzky maintains a website critical of Study Technology, and told the Los Angeles Times that the terms "Director of Qualifications" and the school's "Qual" department refer to those tested by a Church of Scientology qualifications teacher in a Scientology Auditing session. Karin Pouw, Scientology spokeswoman and director of public affairs for Church of Scientology International, disputed Touretzky's statements and asserted to the Los Angeles Times that Study Tech is not a religious methodology and is used in schools internationally.

In early September 2008 members of the anti-Scientology group Project Chanology protested outside of New Village Academy and objected to their claims that L. Ron Hubbard techniques were being used in the school.

In July 2009, Olivier and several of the teachers resigned from their posts for undisclosed reasons. Olivier was replaced by Piano Foster, an educator with Scientology associations; Foster began at the school on July 1, 2009. Piano Foster has participated in Scientology courses. Foster completed the Scientology class, Basic Study Manual, at the Scientology Celebrity Center in 2005. Olivier was let go from her US$200,000 position, due to disagreements over teaching methodologies to utilize at the school. A representative for Will Smith and Jada Pinkett Smith told the New York Post, "Jacquie is no longer at the school for reasons entirely unrelated to curriculum. She is an excellent educator and fully embraced the school's secular and open-minded approach to innovative teaching methodologies."

The New York Post reported that Olivier left the school due to conflicts with the Smiths over the Scientology "Study Tech" teaching methodologies. Foster confirmed she had been placed as the new administrator for the school, and stated, "I officially took over on July 1, 2009, and I'm looking forward to the challenge. I feel I'm ready for the job." Suri Cruise began attending in April 2009. According to the Smiths, the school has no religious affiliation.

== See also ==
- Delphi Schools
- Greenfields School
- Mace-Kingsley Ranch School
- World Literacy Crusade
