= Scientology in Egypt =

Scientology in Egypt has no official presence because non-monotheistic religions are not recognized in Egypt. The Church of Scientology has claimed that Egypt is one of the "countries in which Dianetics and Scientology services are ministered", but there are no known membership statistics available. In 2002, two Scientologists were detained by Egyptian authorities under the charges of "contempt of religion". As of 2010, books authored by Scientology founder L. Ron Hubbard and printed by the Church of Scientology for its front groups were being distributed in Egypt—even bearing the approval of Al-Azhar, the highest Sunni learning institution in the Muslim world. Narconon, an organization that promotes Hubbard's drug abuse treatment, has a branch in Ismailia Governorate called "Narconon Egypt".

== Detention of two members ==
On December 24, 2001, Egyptian authorities arrested two members of the Church of Scientology: Mahmoud Massarwa, a 28-year-old Israeli citizen of Palestinian origin, and his Palestinian wife Wafaa Ahmad. They were charged with "contempt of religion" and were accused of trying to establish a branch in Egypt and harm the country's two main religions "with the aim of sparking riots". Two months later, a court extended their custody for 30 days to allow further police questioning, adding that they have confessed to have come to Egypt in order to spread their doctrine. Human rights director of the Church of Scientology, Leisa Goodman, denied these claims on behalf of the Church (Note: Use of "Church" or "the Church" is a common shortened form of "Church of Scientology"; see The Church (Scientology).) and said that the couple was in the country representing the Italian branch of New Era Publications, a firm that publishes the works of L. Ron Hubbard, to promote Hubbard's book Dianetics: The Modern Science of Mental Health, stressing that the authorities had allowed the book's entry to Egypt. "We are greatly concerned at their prolonged detention, which appears to be a violation of their right to freedom of expression," Goodman said. The two were finally released the next month and the court ruled that condemning people for adopting new ideas is a violation of human rights.

== Scientology books in Egypt ==
Arabic-language translations of books by L. Ron Hubbard, such as Dianetics: The Modern Science of Mental Health and The Way to Happiness, have been sold in several book stores in Egypt and were made available at the annual Cairo International Book Fair. The books bore the approval stamp of Al-Azhar, the Muslim world's highest Sunni learning institution. They were printed in Denmark, both in English and Arabic, and shipped to Egypt by New Era Publications. Professor Ahmed Abdel Khalek of Al-Azhar University, who had served as chief-of-staff and translator to the Grand Imam of al-Azhar, said that he had no objections to the approval of the books unless they violated "morality and traditions". "We should be open-minded and listen to the other. After all, if I disagree with something in a book, I should write a rebuttal," he said. New Era Publications' public relations office said that Al-Azhar's approval was essential and insisted that there was nothing religious about the books.

== Narconon ==
Narconon Egypt is a drug abuse treatment center based in Ismailia Governorate, previously in Fayoum. It is a branch of the Narconon organization, a Scientology front group that promotes L. Ron Hubbard's unscientific methods of detoxifying the body. In 2010, Narconon Egypt's executive director Mohamed Nour Salah said there was no connection between Narconon Egypt and the Church of Scientology, and stressed that it was a non-profit organization and that none of the staff were Scientologists. Nevertheless, Narconon Egypt's website mentions Hubbard's work as an inspiration for its founding.
