= 2020 Clearwater, Florida municipal elections =

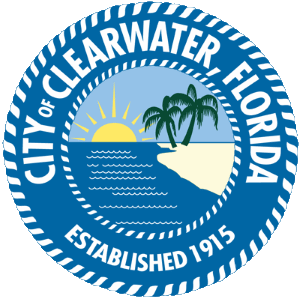
- March 17, 2020

Clearwater, Florida, held a general election on March 17, 2020, to elect a mayor and two members of the city council (seat 2 and 3). These elections coincided with the Democratic and Republican presidential preference primaries.

== Background ==
The Clearwater City Council consists of a mayor and four council members, who each serve four-year terms. Incumbent mayor George Cretekos, who was first elected in 2012 and re-elected unopposed in 2016, was ineligible to run for re-election to a third consecutive term.

City council elections were held for seat 2 (held by Jay Polglaze) and seat 3 (held by Bob Cundiff). (Note: Elections for seat 4 and seat 5 were most recently held in 2018 and won by David Allbritton and Hoyt Hamilton respectively.)

Issues raised throughout these elections included the proposal of a new amphitheater downtown, diversity in city government, rights of nature, and Scientology. The COVID-19 pandemic in Florida began two weeks before the elections, which raised concerns for the safety of in-person voters and poll workers.

== Mayor ==
2020 Clearwater mayoral election
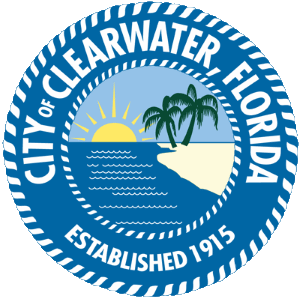
- March 17, 2020
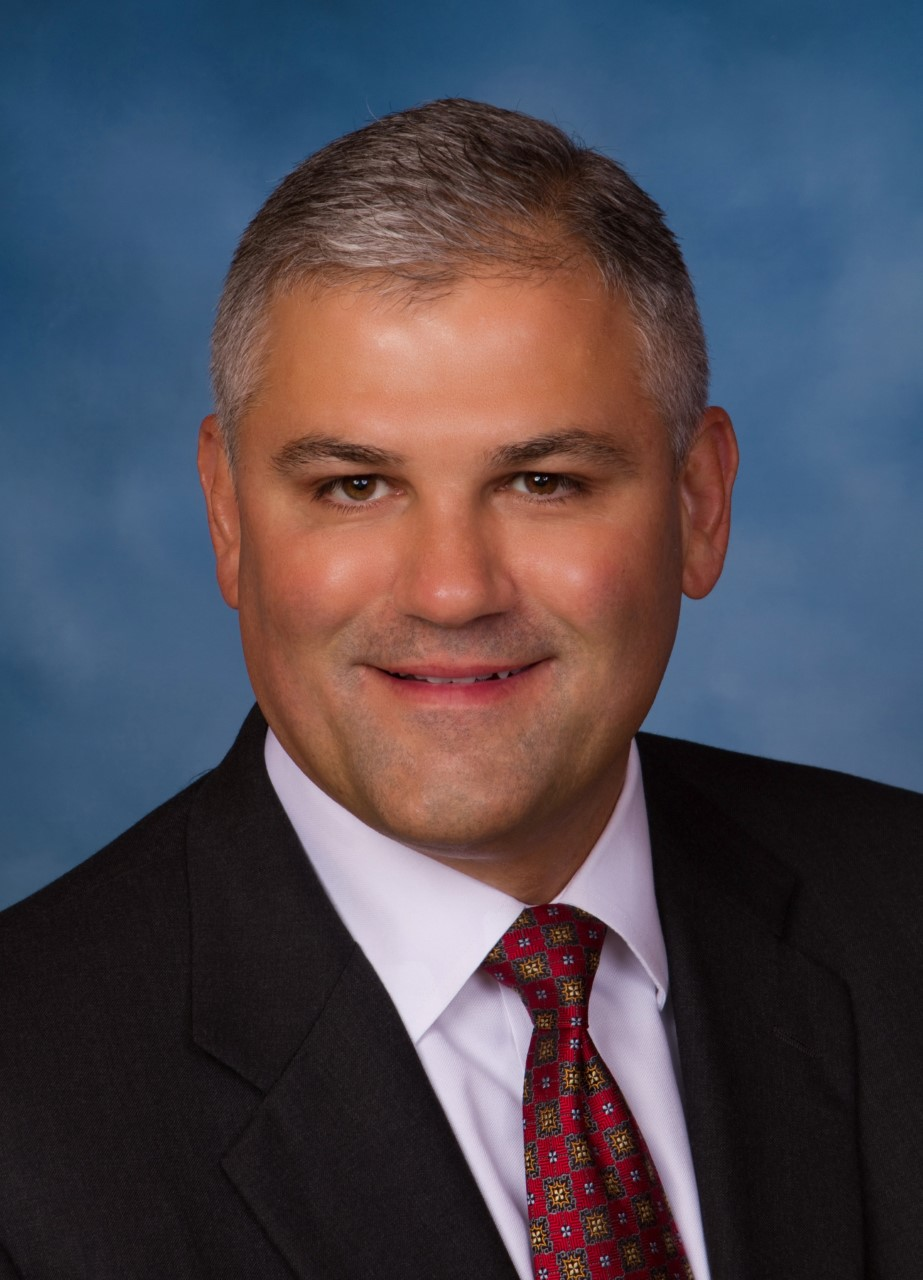

Nominee	Frank Hibbard	Elizabeth Drayer
Party	Nonpartisan	Nonpartisan
Popular vote	13,194	5,727
Percentage	55.17%	23.95%
Nominee	Bill Jonson	Morton Myers
Party	Nonpartisan	Nonpartisan
Popular vote	3,862	1,133
Percentage	16.15%	4.74%
- Precinct results Hibbard: 40–50% 50–60% 60–70% 70–80% Drayer: 30–40% 40–50% No votes
Mayor of Clearwater before election
George Cretekos
Republican
Elected Mayor of Clearwater
Frank Hibbard
Republican

=== Candidates ===
- Elizabeth "Sea Turtle" Drayer, retired attorney and former EPA employee
- Frank Hibbard, former two-term Clearwater mayor (2005–2012)
- Bill Jonson, former four-term Clearwater city councilmember (2001–2007, 2010–2018)
- Morton Myers, multiple small business owner, Clearwater native

=== Endorsements ===
Elizabeth "Sea Turtle" Drayer

Organizations

- Florida NOW PAC
- Pinellas County Democratic Hispanic Caucus
- Sierra Club Suncoast Chapter

Individuals

- Bill Bucolo, founder of Florida Democratic Environmental Caucus
- Karl Deigert, civic leader and co-owner (Anglers Inn)
- Cathy Harrelson, co-founder of St. Petersburg Sustainability Council
- Neil Taylor, business owner (Strike Three Kayak Fishing)
- Grant Wilson, executive director for Earth Law Center
Frank Hibbard

Organizations

- ClearPAC, political action committee representing AMPLIFY Clearwater
- Clearwater Police Department, Fraternal Order of Police Lodge 10
- Pinellas REALTOR Organization

Newspapers

- Tampa Bay Times

Individuals

- Al Capogna, business owner (Capogna's Dugout)
- Haley Crum, executive vice president of Frank Crum
- Matt Crum, president of Frank Winston Crum Insurance
- John Doran, former Clearwater city councilmember
- Jerry Figurski, Countryside resident
- Melody Figurski, Countryside resident
- Nicholas Fritsch, former Community Development Board chairman
- Brett Miller, Citizens for Social Reform
- Carlen Petersen, former Clearwater city councilmember
- Trisha Rodriguez, small business owner
- Joanie Sigal, Citizens for Social Reform
- Steve Sigal, Citizens for Social Reform
- John Walser, retired Clearwater Police Department detective
Bill Jonson

Individuals

- Nino Accetta, resident and community activist
- Douglas Booher, Spring Branch
- Desmond Buzzell, resident and community activist
- Beth Davis, resident and community activist
- Anne Garris, Clearwater Beach
- Isay Gulley, president of Clearwater Neighborhood Housing Services
- Johanna Guzik, resident and community activist
- Edward Hopwood, DMD, Countryside
- Margaret Hyde, Shady Oaks Farms
- Sally Keith, Countryside
- Gerry Lee, Wynwoods Landing
- Jill Melkonian, resident and community activist
- Brenda Harris Nixon, local photographer
- Patrick Raftery, Countryside
- Charlie Rutz, Countryside
- Howard Warshauer, former president of Clearwater Neighborhoods Coalition
- Ronnie White, North Greenwood
Morton Myers

Organizations

- Dairy Kurl (business owned by Myers)
- Tampa Bay Pawn (business owned by Myers)

=== Fundraising ===
Upon the launch of her campaign, Drayer pledged not to accept any money contributions, saying, "The sea turtle cannot be bought." She led the first campaign fundraising numbers between September 19 to September 30, with a $20,000 personal check from herself; Hibbard raised $19,950 (including $1,000 of his own money); Jonson raised $6,370.20, including a $5,000 personal loan and a $20.20 cash contribution; and Myers did not report any fundraising numbers, as he filed to run after the first fundraising report deadline. It was subsequently reported that Myers had raised $2,100 (all from himself via a personal loan) before November.

Hibbard and Jonson, the two former officeholders in the race, were the only candidates who raised money in November, earning $8,926 and $6,785 respectively; this raised Hibbard's total to $100,419 and Jonson's total to $20,475.40. As of a January article from Tampa Bay Times, Hibbard had reportedly raised $110,469 total, while Jonson had raised $25,340 total. Drayer and Myers, the two non-politicians in the race, continued to self-fund their campaigns, with earned totals of $20,000 and $3,100 respectively (the former's total remaining the same since September). As of January, Hibbard had earned 25% of his donations from businesses, compared to Jonson's 9%; however, Jonson led Hibbard in individual donations from Clearwater residents. Hibbard received donations from powerful political and wealthy figures such as Florida State Senator Ed Hooper, DEX Imaging CEO Daniel Doyle Jr., and political action committees associated with Jack and Chris Latvala.

=== Results ===
2020 Clearwater mayoral election
Party	Candidate	Votes	%
Nonpartisan	Frank Hibbard	13,194	55.17
Nonpartisan	Elizabeth "Sea Turtle" Drayer	5,727	23.95
Nonpartisan	Bill Jonson	3,862	16.15
Nonpartisan	Morton Myers	1,133	4.74
Total votes		23,916	100

== City council elections ==
=== Seat 2 ===
Incumbent councilmember Jay Polglaze declined to run for a new term.

==== Candidates ====
- Mark Bunker, filmmaker and critic of the Church of Scientology
- Michael "Mike" Mannino, small business owner and local soccer coach
- Bruce Rector, attorney, author and businessman
- Eliseo Santana Jr., United States Army veteran and retired Pinellas County Sheriff's Office tech worker
- Lina Teixeira, small business owner and fashion designer

==== Endorsements ====
Mark Bunker

Individuals

- Denis deVlaming, attorney
- Leah Remini, actress, producer and co-host of Leah Remini: Scientology and the Aftermath
- Mike Rinder, co-host of Leah Remini: Scientology and the Aftermath
- Aaron Smith-Levin, board member for The Aftermath Foundation
Michael "Mike" Mannino

Organizations

- Clearwater Fire Fighters Association
- Clearwater Police Department, Fraternal Order of Police Lodge 10 (co-endorsement with Bruce Rector)
- Sierra Club Suncoast Chapter
Bruce Rector

Organizations

- ClearPAC, political action committee representing AMPLIFY Clearwater
- Clearwater Police Department, Fraternal Order of Police Lodge 10 (co-endorsement with Michael "Mike" Mannino)
Eliseo Santana Jr.

Organizations

- Florida NOW PAC
- Pinellas County Democratic Hispanic Caucus
- United for Progress

Individuals

- Brett Miller, Citizens for Social Reform
- Joanie Sigal, Citizens for Social Reform
- Steve Sigal, Citizens for Social Reform
Lina Teixeira

Organizations

- Pinellas REALTOR Organization

Individuals

- David Aardsma, retired professional baseball pitcher
- Ray Burris, retired professional baseball pitcher
- Lissette Campos, journalist
- Darryl Rouson, Democratic Florida State Senator (since 2016)

==== Results ====
2020 Clearwater city council election - Seat 2
Party	Candidate	Votes	%
Nonpartisan	Mark Bunker	6,170	27.10
Nonpartisan	Michael "Mike" Mannino	5,909	25.96
Nonpartisan	Lina Teixeira	4,522	19.86
Nonpartisan	Eliseo Santana Jr.	3,369	14.80
Nonpartisan	Bruce Rector	2,795	12.28
Total votes		22,765	100

=== Seat 3 ===
==== Candidates ====
- Kathleen Beckman, retired teacher
- Robert "Dr. Bob" Cundiff, incumbent Clearwater city councilmember (since 2016)
- Bud Elias, small business owner
- Scott R. Thomas, former two-term Pottsville, Pennsylvania school board member and human resources director

==== Endorsements ====
Kathleen Beckman

Organizations

- Florida NOW PAC
- Pinellas County Democratic Hispanic Caucus
- Sierra Club Suncoast Chapter

Individuals

- Muhammad Abdur-Rahim, community activist
- Gary Baker, attorney
- Kate Baker, president and owner of Assure Title, LLC
- Brad Barnes, non-profit director
- Nicole Carr, Pinellas County School Board member
- Christine Clifford, small business owner
- Leslie Coley, small business owner
- Donna Dennis, Clearwater Library Advisory Board member
- Jim Dyson, founder of Ridgecrest Elementary Panther Pals Reading
- Camile Hebting, manager for Clearwater Ferry
- Manos Kranias, small business owner
- Janet Long, Pinellas County Commissioner
- Brett Miller, Citizens for Social Reform
- Martin O'Malley, former governor of Maryland (2007–2015); former mayor of Baltimore (1999–2007); candidate for President in 2016
- Joanie Sigal, Citizens for Social Reform
- Steve Sigal, Citizens for Social Reform
- John Thomas, vice chair for the Environmental Advisory Board and president of Florida Botanical Gardens Foundation
- Marilyn Turman, local business owner
Robert "Dr. Bob" Cundiff

Individuals

- Cathi Chamberlain, author
- Billy Day, Clearwater Beach hospitality business owner
- Doug Kelly, local radio host
- Ethel Kearnes Mayer, retired Clearwater High School teacher
- John Tewksbury, chief operations officer for BeachTran
- Karen Tewksbury, chief operations officer for BeachTran
- Dr. George Youstra, former Reagan Administration member and former Clearwater Christian College president
Bud Elias

Organizations

- Clearwater Fire Fighters Association
- Clearwater Police Department, Fraternal Order of Police Lodge 10 (co-endorsement with Scott R. Thomas)
- Pinellas REALTOR Organization

Individuals

- Barbara Green, founder of Homeless Emergency Project
- Kevin Hayslett, Esq., defense attorney
- Karen Seel, Pinellas County Commissioner
Scott R. Thomas

Organizations

- ClearPAC, political action committee representing AMPLIFY Clearwater
- Clearwater Police Department, Fraternal Order of Police Lodge 10 (co-endorsement with Bud Elias)

Individuals

- Elder Christopher Ervin, minister of Bible Church of God in North Greenwood
- Linda Kubilius, vice president of the Clearwater Beach Association
- Patrick Raftery, Countryside resident

==== Results ====
2020 Clearwater city council election - Seat 3
Party	Candidate	Votes	%
Nonpartisan	Kathleen Beckman	11,228	48.90
Nonpartisan	Bud Elias	4,971	21.65
Nonpartisan	Robert "Dr. Bob" Cundiff	3,929	17.11
Nonpartisan	Scott R. Thomas	2,835	12.35
Total votes		22,963	100
