= Citizens for Social Reform =

Scientologist-run political action committee

- Formation: 2001
- Type: Political Action Committee founded in 2001 by Scientologists
- Legal status: Non-profit
- Headquarters: Sacramento, California, United States
- President: Don Pearson
- Website: csrpac.org

Citizens for Social Reform (CSRPAC) was a political action committee founded in 2001 by Scientologists. Its primary mission was "to work with elected officials toward the goal of bringing about more humane and effective solutions to social ills like illiteracy, criminality, substance abuse and the general decay of moral character", mainly by promoting Scientology associated programs including Narconon, Criminon, Applied Scholastics and CCHR with legislators at the US federal and state levels. CSRPAC went inactive on June 30, 2007.

Their website, csrpac.org, while often avoiding direct references to the Church of Scientology, used much L. Ron Hubbard-based language. An entire section on their site was devoted to a "Citizen Hat" treatise listing Scientology books such as The Antisocial Personality and The Thinking Book side by side with basic civics texts such as The Federalist Papers and the U.S. Constitution. The "Citizen Hat" was illustrated by Scientologist Virginia Romero. CSR's website also dealt with anti-psychiatry issues, a key topic for Scientologists.

The former president of CSRPAC was Don Pearson. Corporation records show that Don Pearson opened a local chapter of the Citizen's Commission in 1998. Pearson also set up a political action committee called the Association of Citizens for Social Reform, for the purpose of eliminating "public support for social, educational and mental health programs that are intrusive, force-based or damaging to individual awareness and competence."

== See also ==
- Scientology front groups
