= Scientology in Pakistan =

Scientology in Pakistan is said to be followed among a very small number of people, mainly from the middle and upper classes of Karachi.

Scientologists, operating under the name Society for Advancement of Health, Education and the Environment (SAHEE) have administered the self-study programme named Criminon in Karachi jails, alleging 1,500 prisoners have completed the course.

== See also ==
- Religion in Pakistan
