= Dunedin Academy =

K–12 private school in Dunedin, Florida, US

Location
- Dunedin, Florida; United States; 28.024035°N 82.76425°W

Information
- Type: Private
- Religious affiliation: Christian (non-denominational)
- Grades: K–12
- Gender: Co-educational
- Enrollment: 181 (2007–08)
- Campus type: Suburban
- Website: Official site

Dunedin Academy is a K–12 private school in Dunedin, Florida, US. The school had an enrollment of 181 in year 2007–08. It is a Christian, non-denominational, co-educational school.

Dunedin Academy state that their Elementary & Middle School has won over 100 national and state awards. Student Alissa Jeup won the statewide 1994 Junior American Citizens contest that was sponsored by the Daughters of the American Revolution. Gregory Culmone then won the 1996 contest.

== Notable alumni ==
- Stephen Bessette, New York Yankees
- Christopher J Mauer, basis for the HBO television series, "Hung"
- Nathan Rich, scientology critic
