= Don Pearson =

Don Pearson is Chief Strategy Officer for Inductive Automation, a supplier of web-based industrial automation software based in Folsom, California. He was formerly a management consultant and executive for the Folsom, California publishing company, e.Republic. Pearson is perhaps best known for his role in training Allstate Insurance Company managers and salesmen in the tenets of L. Ron Hubbard's 'management by statistics' during the late 1980s and early 1990s. In 1998, Pearson opened a chapter for Citizens Commission on Human Rights, and in 2001 set up a political action committee called the Association of Citizens for Social Reform, the aim of which was to eliminate public support for mental health programs not approved of by Scientology.

== e.Republic ==
Together with fellow Scientologists Dennis McKenna, Pearson operates e.Republic, a media and event management enterprise primarily serving the government information technology market, including Government Technology, Governing, and Converge magazines, which McKenna founded in 1983. Another e.Republic offshoot, the Center for Digital Government, provides research and consulting to state and local governments. e.Republic relies heavily on L. Ron Hubbard's writing as part of its employee training process.

== Management by Statistics ==
Pearson worked as a management consultant for International Executive Technology in the Sacramento area. From 1988 to 1993, his primary client was Allstate Insurance, for whom Pearson taught Hubbard's 'management by statistics', an activity licensed by World Institute of Scientology Enterprises. The training fostered the idea that workers who had low statistics should be penalized for low productivity, or for crossing a favored employee with 'up-statistics'. Some Allstate managers took such ideas too far, resulting in charges of "management by intimidation".

Pearson also pushed other Hubbard books and tapes while a consultant to Allstate. After a lengthy February, 1995 front-page story ran in The Wall Street Journal, describing training that included use of Scientology's 'Tone scale', Allstate banned and repudiated the courses. According to the article, more than 3,500 Allstate supervisors and agents participated in nearly 200 seminars conducted by Pearson's firm. Some agents who worked under managers who took the training courses eventually filed religious-discrimination and harassment charges with the Equal Employment Opportunity Commission.

== See also ==
- Church of Scientology
