= Greenfields School =

Independent day and boarding school

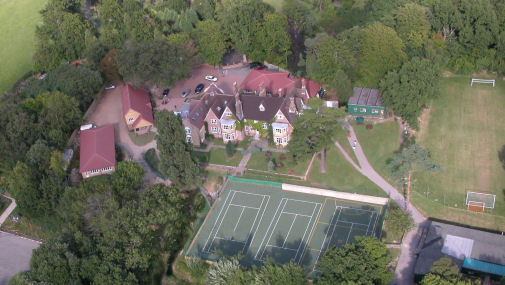
- Greenfields School from above

Location
- Priory Road; Forest Row, East Sussex, RH18 5JD; England; 51°05′18″N 0°00′54″E

Information
- Type: Private day and boarding
- Motto: Education For Life
- Religious affiliations: Non-Denominational, open to all religions, creeds and cultures
- Established: 1981
- School district: East Sussex
- Local authority: East Sussex
- Head teacher: Andrew Hodgson
- Staff: 50
- Gender: Mixed
- Campus size: 29 acres
- Colors: Green, Purple, Blue and White
- Website: greenfieldsschool.com

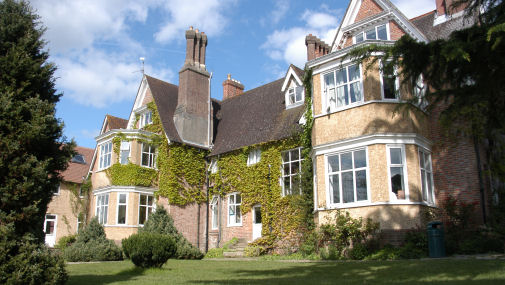
A Greenfields School building

Greenfields School is an independent, co-educational day and boarding public school for boys and girls aged 3 to 18 in Forest Row, East Sussex, England. It has a Montessori-based Pre-school & Reception class, followed by Infant, Junior, Senior, 6th Form and EFL (English as a Foreign Language) classes. The school uses the Cambridge Curriculum and is a member of the Independent Schools Council.

== History ==
The school was founded in 1981 by Margaret Hodkin and moved to Forest Row in 1983. It is run by the Greenfields Educational Trust, a registered charity. As of 2024 it has about 180 pupils, of whom 30 are boarders.

== Study method ==
Greenfields uses a study method called Study Technology which is a teaching method developed by Scientology founder L. Ron Hubbard, and licensed from Church of Scientology's educational arm, Applied Scholastics. The school's website states that it does not teach any religious philosophies and includes children of all nationalities, cultures and religions.

The school has English as a Foreign Language programmes for international students. Summer holiday programmes run from June to August, minimum stay 1 week. The school also runs English programmes all year around for children from 10 to 18 years old. Boarding is on-campus and the school also has many day students.

== Buildings ==
Recent building developments have included a new four-classroom block in the Senior School, a purpose-built Sports Hall in the Lower School and a complete renovation of the Main Senior Building.

== Reports ==
In 1994, one of the teachers from the school was jailed for five years after he admitted sexually molesting teenage pupils.

In 2006, a detailed article was published by Tes in which the teaching methods used by the school were discussed. It pointed out that these had been praised by school inspectors from the Independent Schools Inspectorate. The Financial Times had said the school had the most improved A-level results for an independent school and had ranked it at number 46th in England. At that time, 90 per cent of teachers and 80 per cent of pupils were from Scientologist backgrounds but the deputy head said that its religious philosophies were not being taught.

A 2012 newspaper report suggested that many students left the school after completing their GCSEs, without going on to the sixth form, in order to transfer to Sea Org. Another similar report calls this a "rumour" but notes that, owing to the school's proximity to Scientology's UK headquarters and the teaching methods used, it attracts children whose parents are employed there.

During the COVID pandemic, the trust running the school was given £200,000 in UK government support.

The school was inspected by the Independent Schools Inspectorate in March 2024. Their report noted that standards relating to the quality of education and to leadership and management were not met. Recordkeeping and promotion of wellbeing of pupils was also deficient, and required standards relating to pupil safeguarding were not met. Day pupils and especially boarders had insufficient outside activities, recreation, and free time. Boarding accommodations only met minimal standards.

Greenfields announced that as of July 31, 2024 they were no longer able to sponsor students from outside the UK because their ability to sponsor had been withdrawn by UK Visas and Immigration.

== Notable alumni ==
- Joanna Bessey, Malaysia-based actress and director
- Shannon Tarbet, actress
