= Nathan Rich =

American author and Scientology critic

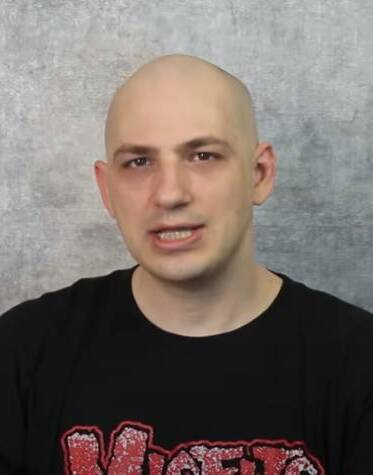
- Rich in 2019
- Born: February 13, 1982 (age 44); Los Angeles, California, U.S.
- Other names: Hotpot King (火锅大王)
- Occupations: Chief technology officer; Content creator; author
- Known for: Criticism of Scientology
- Television: Leah Remini: Scientology and the Aftermath
- Relatives: Sharon Rich (aunt)

Bilibili information
- Channel: NathanRich火锅大王
- Years active: 2019–present
- Followers: 1.39 million

YouTube information
- Channel: @NathanRichHotpot
- Years active: 2018–present
- Subscribers: 486,000
- Views: 38 million
- Last updated: 2 March 2026
- Website: hotpot.team

Nathan Rich (born February 13, 1982) is an American YouTuber with half a million subscribers, author, and Scientology critic. He appeared on Leah Remini: Scientology and the Aftermath alongside classmate Tara Reile about their experiences at the Scientology boarding school, the Mace-Kingsley Ranch School.

== Early life and education ==
Rich is the only child of Julie Miriam Rich, a pet communicator, who died from cancer in 2010. He completed only two school grades, seventh and eighth grades, at Dunedin Academy. He spent four years at the Mace-Kingsley Ranch when he was 8 and 14 years old. At 17, he left home and was later disconnected by his family. He spent seven years homeless while using and dealing drugs before attending community college.

== Scientology ==
=== Mace-Kingsley Ranch ===
At 8 years old, Rich was sent to the Scientology boarding school, the Mace-Kingsley Ranch in Palmdale, California, and then again at age 14. Rich alleges the Ranch was an abusive environment, with punishments including being scrubbed with a metal fence brush and paddling from the staff.

=== Documentaries ===
In October 2017 Rich appeared in episode 17 of the U.S. documentary series, Leah Remini: Scientology and the Aftermath.

== Autobiography ==
In 2018, Nathan Rich published a book about his experiences in Scientology and at the Mace-Kingsley Ranch, titled Scythe Tleppo: My Survival of a Cult, Abandonment, Addiction and Homelessness. According to reviewer Tony Ortega, "Scythe Tleppo is a roller coaster ride between these moments of clarity and one shocking scene after another told in brutal detail about the ways Nathan was abused, the ways he abused himself, and his ever downward spiral to homelessness and near-suicidal drug use."

== Personal life ==
Since moving to China, Rich has started a video blog sympathetic to the People's Republic of China. Among the views he holds are that those who had taken part in the Hong Kong protests were "terrorists" and "right-wing", and that Taiwan was an integral part of China and could therefore not be a state. He has also commented on the China–United States trade war and China's handling of the coronavirus pandemic.

== See also ==
- Propaganda in China
