= Village Suisse ONG =

Village Suisse ONG is a Swiss-based NGO, accredited to the UN ECOSOC, with a stated mandate to help children in developing countries, to provide computers to persons in developing countries and to provide social integration for persons in Switzerland.

== Village Suisse ONG and the Church of Scientology ==
Village Suisse ONG is associated with several events of the Church of Scientology.

The relationship of Village Suisse ONG to the Church of Scientology caused media controversy in 2009, when the UN Office at Geneva (UNOG) refused entrance of the Scientology group Des jeunes pour les droits de l’homme ("Youth for Human Rights") to the UN premises, for a meeting which had been planned and organized by Village Suisse ONG. Two members of the Church of Scientology, Martine Rhein and Christian Mirre, had traveled to Geneva to oversee the conference; they did not deny their membership in the church, but maintained that there was no connection between the group and Scientology. However, as reported by the Tribune de Geneve, the organization, whose statues were filled in Switzerland, was a direct offshoot of the American group, Youth for Human Rights, which is known to be run by the Church of Scientology.

In 2016, Village Suisse ONG was again noted by the Tribune de Geneve for holding a conference for a "Day of the NGOs", sponsored by the Church of Scientology. The news-article claimed that documentation distributed at the meeting in the UN's Palais des Nations was probably edited by the Church of Scientology.

== See also ==
- Youth for Human Rights International
