= Concerned Businessmen's Association of America =

Scientology front group

The Concerned Businessmen's Association of America (CBAA), founded in 1983, is a Scientology-related movement directed at promoting moral education and "enhanced well-being". The organization uses L. Ron Hubbard's The Way to Happiness booklet as part of their Set A Good Example (SAGE) program, which holds children's anti-drug contests, and awards grants to participating schools. The Way to Happiness presents Scientology's religious concepts in a secular framework. The CBAA licenses the trademarks of the Association for Better Living and Education (ABLE). Their office is located in Reno, Nevada.

In 2007, they changed their name to Set a Good Example Foundation.

== Media mention ==
In 1988, St. Petersburg Times listed them as "A Glendale, Calif.-based group of Scientologists that promotes drug-free living through its Way to Happiness book and like-named campaign, targeted to school-age children."

In 1991, Time magazine listed the CBAA as a Church of Scientology-linked group that "holds antidrug contests and awards $5,000 grants to schools as a way to recruit students and curry favor with education officials."

In 1998, the Boston Herald listed them on an organization chart under "Groups that teach Hubbard's management techniques".
