= Mace-Kingsley Ranch School =

Church of Scientology affiliated ranch school

Location
- 9 mi (14 km) NE of Reserve along New Mexico State Road 12; Reserve, New Mexico 87830; United States; 33°48′39″N 108°40′59″W

Information
- Other name: New Mexico Ranch School
- Type: Ranch school
- Religious affiliation: Scientology
- Opened: 1987
- Closed: 2002
- School district: Reserve Independent School District
- Gender: Coeducational
- Age: 8 to 17
- Language: English
- Campus size: 14,278 acres (5,778 ha)
- Campus type: Rural
- Tuition: US$30,000-75,000
- Affiliation: Applied Scholastics, Association for Better Living and Education, Religious Technology Center, Church of Scientology
- Website: Mace-Kingsley Ranch School

Mace-Kingsley Ranch School (later called The Ranch School, Inc., and the New Mexico Ranch School) was a ranch school for children aged 8 to 17 affiliated with the Church of Scientology. The School opened in 1987 and based in Palmdale, California before moving to a property in the Gila Wilderness, New Mexico in the early 1990s. It closed in 2002 and its certificate of incorporation was revoked. The school's curriculum focused heavily on the teachings of Scientology. Students were subjected to pseudo-scientific processes such as the Purification Rundown and daily auditing. A large portion of each day was dedicated to cleaning and general manual labor. The school received criticism over the years for the treatment of students under its care. Students have reported cases of being underfed as well as being beaten, whipped and publicly humiliated as forms of punishment.

== History ==
The Mace-Kingsley Ranch School was opened in 1987 in Palmdale, California by Scientologists Debra Mace and Carol Kingsley. The school stated that its purpose was to help kids in trouble by creating a safe environment for them away from the influences that were causing them problems. In the early 1990s, the school moved from its Palmdale location to a ranch in the Gila Wilderness, New Mexico. The school was located approximately nine miles (fourteen kilometers) northeast from the town of Reserve on New Mexico State Road 12. The ranch was situated on 158 acres (64 hectares) of land comprising two main areas, the upper ranch and the lower ranch. Attached to this was another 14,120 acres (5,710 hectares) leased from the US Forest Service.

The school was coeducational and was responsible for children as young as 8 years old. The boys dormitories were located at the lower ranch where most of the daily activities took place and the girls dormitories were at the upper ranch, around two miles (three kilometers) away. The school was eventually shut down in 2002 and its certificate of incorporation was revoked. After the school closed, the property was re-branded as the Hacienda del Espirito and was advertised for sale in 2003 at $1,700,000, later that year the sale price was raised to $2,000,000 before eventually being reduced to $1,499,000 in 2005.

== Scientology methodology ==
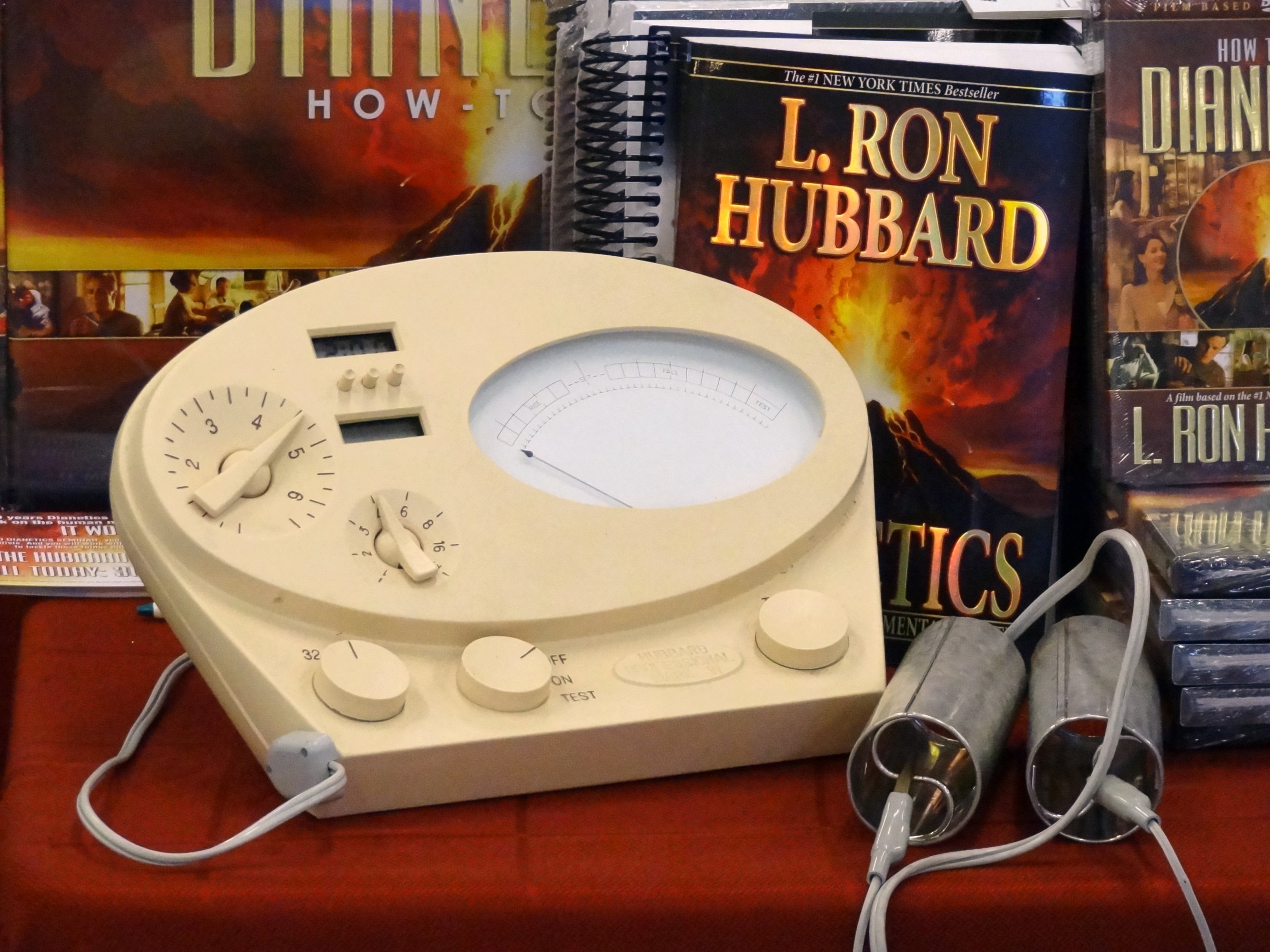
An E-Meter

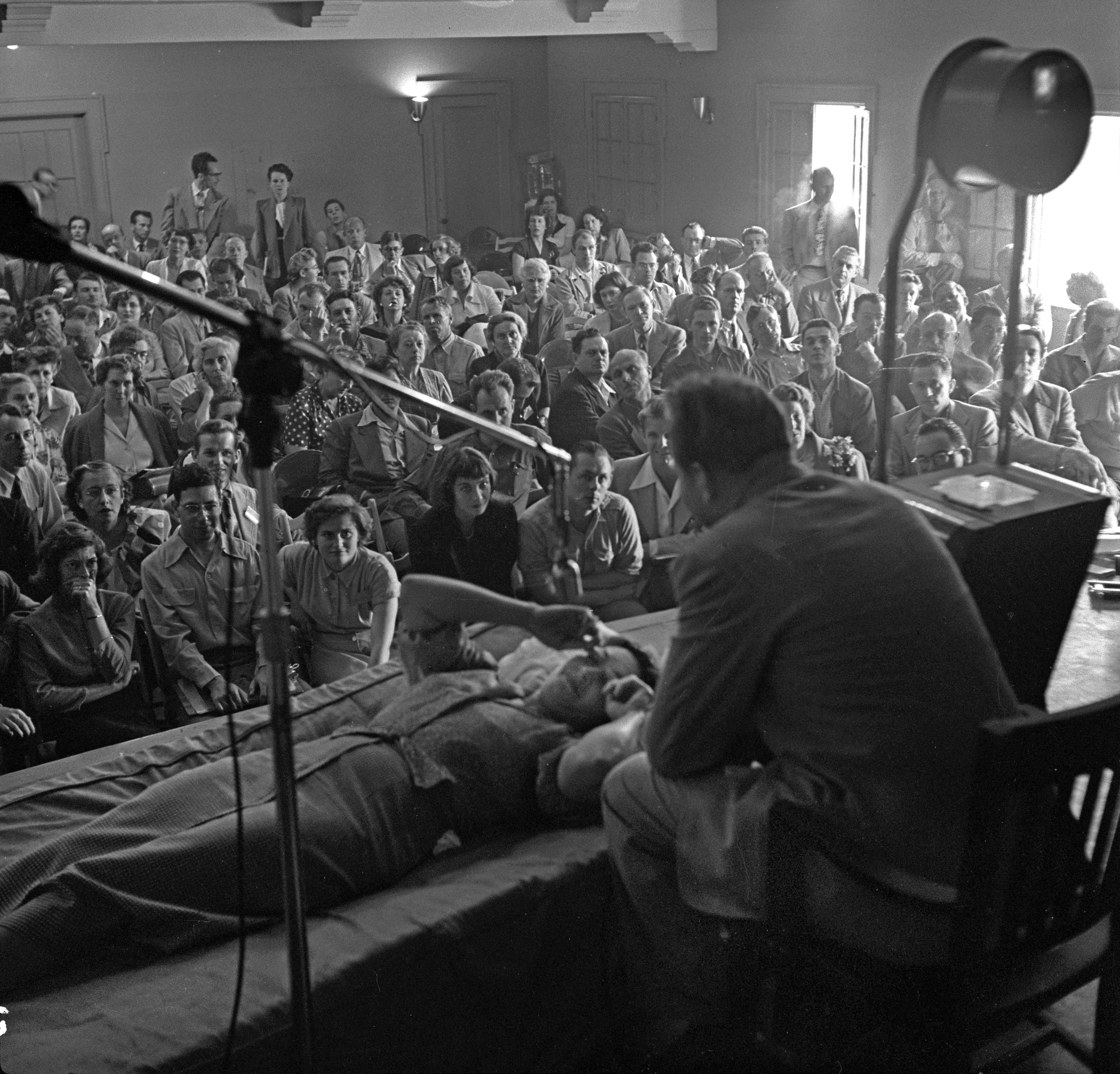
L. Ron Hubbard conducting Dianetics seminar in Los Angeles in 1950

The school utilized the "Study Technology" methodology developed by Scientology founder L. Ron Hubbard. A copyright notice on the school's website gave "grateful acknowledgement" to the L. Ron Hubbard Library for usage of works of the Scientology founder. The website also acknowledged that the school was "licensed" to use educational methodology from Applied Scholastics, a "service mark" owned by Association for Better Living and Education. The school's website also noted that terms including Dianetics, Scientology, Purification Rundown, and Oxford Capacity Analysis "are trademarks and service marks" of the Religious Technology Center. The school was endorsed by actress and Scientologist Kelly Preston.

Lon Woodbury of Woodbury Reports visited the school site in 2000, and evaluated it on his website in 2001. He noted that many of the classes were based on techniques developed by L. Ron Hubbard, and commented: "For a parent considering Mace-Kingsley Ranch School for their child, I would recommend obtaining at least a basic knowledge of Scientology. Since that is so central to the school’s program, it would be vital for the parents to be comfortable with its major tenets."

Upon arrival at the school students were first administered an IQ test before being subjected to the Purification Rundown. Students were then given the Oxford Capacity Analysis, a pseudo-scientific Scientology personality test originally designed in the early 1950s. In order to graduate from the program, students were required to complete The 10 requirements which included steps such as "orientation and willingness", "changing past patterns" and "demonstrating lessons learned". Daily auditing using E-Meters was also required of students.

== Criticism ==
=== Janet Reitman ===
Janet Reitman investigated the school before its closure. Her article in Rolling Stone magazine, "Inside Scientology", was critical of the school's practices. Reitman noted, "The school enforced a rigid Scientology focus that many former students now say served as both a mechanism of control and a form of religious indoctrination". This Rolling Stone article was selected for inclusion in The Best American Magazine Writing 2007, published by Columbia University Press.

=== Phoenix New Times ===
In an interview in 2009 with the Phoenix New Times regarding his time at the school, Charlie Brand of the Miniature Tigers said, "It was bizarre because my family's not Scientologists. My parents thought it was for troubled teens. [The camp] forced Scientology on you, and you had to go through the steps before you could leave. You had to use an E-Meter and study guides about all their beliefs. I fought it for a while but eventually was like, 'Yeah, this Scientology stuff is great,' and faked it".

=== Leah Remini: Scientology and the Aftermath ===
The A&E program Leah Remini: Scientology and the Aftermath aired an episode entirely dedicated to the ranch entitled "The Ranches". In the episode, former students Tara Reile and Nathan Rich make multiple accusations of child abuse and neglect, including being required to perform heavy manual labor daily, being denied sufficient food and nutrition for the amount of physical activity, being kept from communicating with family members, and paddlings with a wooden board. They also described public humiliations including being paddled with underpants down and being scrubbed with a wire brush by an adult in front of the entire school.

Just before the episode aired, the Church of Scientology added a "dead agenting" webpage about Rich and Reile which featured interviews from their relatives who either didn't know them personally or had long ago disconnected from them.

Audio of Wally Hanks recorded in or around Sep. 1988 at the Mace/Kingsley ranch school on W. Ave R8 in Palmdale, California

The show featured an audio recording of Wally Hanks repeatedly whipping a child with a belt while yelling at him to "look at that picture of LRH (L Ron Hubbard)." After his death in 2017, Hanks's nephew, Brian Hanks was interviewed by Tony Ortega of The Underground Bunker where it was noted that Hanks still kept the paddle he used on students at the ranch mounted on his wall.

=== Nathan Rich ===
In 2018, Nathan Rich published a book about his experiences in Scientology and at the ranch. According to reviewer Tony Ortega, "Scythe Tleppo is a roller coaster ride between these moments of clarity and one shocking scene after another told in brutal detail about the ways Nathan was abused, the ways he abused himself, and his ever downward spiral to homelessness and near-suicidal drug use."

== Mace-Kingsley Family Center ==
Some time after opening the Mace-Kingsley Ranch School, Debra Mace and Carol Kingsley opened the Mace-Kingsley Family Center in Clearwater, Florida. The center caters to Scientologist families and runs a number of programs for children based on the writings of L. Ron Hubbard. These programs include auditing, the purification rundown and Scientology ethics and justice. Scientologists can bring their young children, even infants to be audited at the center.

As of 2023, the business was still in operation as Mace Kingsley Family Center International, Inc. at 900 Grove St, Clearwater Florida.

According to Mike Rinder on an episode of Leah Remini: Scientology and the Aftermath, the Mace-Kingsley Family Center's website took credit for the ranch schools: "Over 30 years ago, Carol Kingsley and Debbie Mace started in the [Los Angeles] area what is now known as the Mace-Kingsley Family Center of Clearwater, Florida. ... Carol and Debbie went on to form several schools, start a ranch in New Mexico that handled kids in trouble and to work with families in many other ways. All this eventually developed into the current Family Center in Florida".
