= Applied Scholastics =

Scientology study techniques organization

- Applied Scholastics International
- Abbreviation: APS
- Formation: 1972
- Founded at: Los Angeles, California
- Type: Educational
- Legal status: Non-profit
- Purpose: Advancing the educational technology developed by L. Ron Hubbard
- Headquarters: 7065 Hollywood Blvd, Ste 200, Los Angeles, California
- Coordinates: 34.101723°N 118.343791°W
- Parent organization: Association for Better Living and Education
- Affiliations: Church of Scientology
- Website: appliedscholastics.org
- Formerly called: Applied Scholastics Incorporated (1972–2000)

Applied Scholastics (APS) is an organization that promotes and licenses the use of study techniques created by L. Ron Hubbard, the founder of Scientology. Applied Scholastics is operated by the Church of Scientology.

== Overview ==
Applied Scholastics, abbreviated "APS", was founded in 1972 by the Church of Scientology in order to disseminate L. Ron Hubbard's learning and teaching methods outside of a religious context. However, Hubbard's methods, which he called "study technology", are an integral part of Scientology practices and is considered a form of indoctrination into and within Scientology.

Applied Scholastics is classified as a dissemination organization in the Church of Scientology network hierarchy. APS falls under the Association for Better Living and Education umbrella which was established in 1987. Prior to that, APS was managed under the Social Coordination Bureau of the Guardian's Office (SoCo). The organization is staffed by Scientology officials, and it licenses the methods and materials to other organizations, and oversees their use.

Applied Scholastics was included in the 1993 closing agreement between the IRS and the Church of Scientology, and was classified as a Scientology-related entity, thus granting it non-profit status. As such, parents of children attending private schools licensed by APS can deduct the cost of tuition from their income tax returns.

Scientologist celebrities have been used to promote Applied Scholastics, including John Travolta, Kelly Preston, Isaac Hayes, Lisa Marie Presley, and Ann Archer. In 1997, Travolta met with President Bill Clinton to promote the program, and later Tom Cruise lobbied to obtain government funding and met with the Secretary of Education. By 2003, APS materials and tutoring programs were approved in several states.

Applied Scholastics has closely managed several service organizations, including:

- Applied Scholastics Hollywood—formerly called the Hollywood Education and Literacy Project (HELP).
- Education Alive
- Effective Education Association in the UK
- Literacy, Education and Abilities Program (LEAP), which was associated with the Mission of Scientology of Memphis
- World Literacy Crusade
- Effective Training Solutions

== Study Tech ==
Study Tech is a teaching methodology developed by L. Ron Hubbard.

Hubbard's theories on education describe three "barriers to learning". The first is the absence of mass, pertaining to the lack of a physical object relating to a concept. The second is a steep study "gradient", meaning a necessary previous step was skipped to master a skill. The third is the "misunderstood word", which necessitates looking up unclear words in the dictionary.

Students are taught that "misunderstood words" are a major cause of confusion and misunderstanding. They are taught to use dictionaries extensively. Emphasis is also put on making sure children are taught at a "gradient", so that a subject's crucial elementary concepts come before more difficult concepts. "Mass" is described as a measure of mental tangibility that students ascribe to a subject, so that students have a picture in their mind of the thing they are learning about.

Applied Scholastics licenses Study Tech to a number of schools throughout the world. In return, these schools pay 4% of their gross income to Applied Scholastics.

== Publishing ==
Applied Scholastics markets several books that are "Based on the works of L. Ron Hubbard" and were copyrighted by L. Ron Hubbard Library and printed by Bridge Publications, the publishing arm of the Church of Scientology. (Note: David S. Touretzky of Carnegie Mellon University comments: "A curious fact about the Study Tech books is that they list no author or editor. The covers all say "Based on the works of L. Ron Hubbard", and the copyright registration is held by the L. Ron Hubbard Library, the business alias of the Church of Scientology's corporate alter ego, the Church of Spiritual Technology. But while the copyright dates are 1992 (or in the case of the Basic Study Manual, 1990), Hubbard died in 1986. So who wrote these books? The decision to list no author or editor was made by Scientology's publisher, Bridge Publications, on the grounds that: "Mr. Hubbard was the author of the ideas and the technology of study... As they are Mr. Hubbard's ideas and methodologies, and his alone, Bridge Publications assigned the credit where it is incontrovertibly due, to L. Ron Hubbard, the originator." (Scott D. Welch, Senior Vice President of Bridge Publications, in a letter to the editor of Education Week, published October 10, 1997)") Later, the books were re-published under the imprint "Effective Education Publishing". They include:

- Learning How to Learn. 1992.
- Study Skills for Life. 1992.
- Basic Study Manual. 1990.
- How to Use a Dictionary. 1990.
- Grammar and Communication. 1992.
- Communicating is Fun. 1992.

Though the books contain a biography of Hubbard, they omit mentioning his role as the founder of Scientology. The books do not mention any connection with Scientology.

Applied Scholastics has also teamed up with educational publisher Heron Books, operated by Delphi Schools, to provide a collection of L. Ron Hubbard's writings on study, education and children.

== Criticism and controversy ==
In the 1980s, Applied Scholastics, Inc., operating as a management consulting group and boasting a stable of high-tech clients, was the subject of a legal dispute between one of their clients, Applied Materials (AM), and three of AM's former employees. The former employees sued AM claiming they were driven out of the company after they complained about the Applied Scholastics training seminars and "refused to be trained under the doctrines of L. Ron Hubbard's Church of Scientology". Applied Scholastics was also named as a defendant in the suit. Employees at AM confirmed that "Scientology teachings were used regularly by the company during self-improvement and confidence seminars led by a company called Applied Scholastics". AM settled for an estimated $600,000 and admitted the company "lacked sensitivity with regard to the controversial nature of L. Ron Hubbard".

In 1998, the group submitted five of its books for approval as supplemental classroom texts to the California Department of Education. The review board found no religious content to object to, although they did object to the lack of portrayals of disabled persons and people of color. The Southern California American Civil Liberties Union, however, objected on the basis that the books used many of the terms and concepts that the Church of Scientology uses elsewhere in its Study Tech.

In the aftermath of Hurricane Katrina, Applied Scholastics convinced the principal of Prescott Middle School in Baton Rouge, Louisiana to implement a program of Study Tech. Critics worried that the move was "an insidious plan ultimately aimed at promoting Scientology." However, Prescott's principal and two education experts claimed that they "saw [no] hidden Scientology agenda or proselytizing in the text." The school's principal felt that the program was worthwhile. In October 2005, St. Louis Public Schools superintendent Creg Williams discovered the group's Scientology connections and immediately advised area principals to cease working with Applied Scholastics. Additionally, CEO Bennetta Slaughter falsely claimed a "partnership" with the Hazelwood School District in St. Louis.

Some parents were upset when Applied Scholastics methods were introduced in September 2008 at Bambolino Montessori Academy, a private school in Toronto. The owner/principal and dean of the school are both Scientologists but they say that Applied Scholastics is secular and that they do not teach Scientology.

The Georgia Board of Education had approved Applied Scholastics in 2006 for a three-year license to tutor under a federal program which pays to tutor students from public schools which don't meet minimum academic criteria. In 2009, four complaints were lodged against Applied Scholastic in Cobb County concerned about their connection with Scientology and about keeping religion out of education. Georgia education officials then began inspections to ensure Applied Scholastics' policies and teachings were geared toward secular instruction.

In 2013, a group of charter schools in Phoenix, Arizona came under criticism for using tools provided by Applied Scholastics.

== See also ==
- Delphi Schools
- Greenfields School
- Progressive Academy
- World Literacy Crusade
