= World Literacy Crusade =

Scientology front group

- Abbreviation: WLC
- Established: 1992
- Founder: Alfreddie Johnson
- Dissolved: 2019
- Type: Nonprofit
- Location: Compton, California

World Literacy Crusade (WLC) was a non-profit organisation formed in 1992 by the Rev. Alfreddie Johnson to fight illiteracy, and supported by the Church of Scientology. WLC has been characterized as a Scientology front group. In 2008 it was involved in a housing voucher scam, and in 2015 its executive director and several others were charged with Medi-Cal and insurance fraud related to its drug detox program.

== Description ==
The group used Scientology's "Study Technology" and drug detoxification methods developed by L. Ron Hubbard, the Church's founder. It was promoted by celebrity Scientologists such as Anne Archer and Isaac Hayes, who was an international spokesman for the World Literacy Crusade.

== Fraud ==
The Los Angeles Times reported in 2008 that about 100 protestors gathered outside of the World Literacy Crusade offices after WLC sold around 250 fake housing vouchers for as much as $1,500 each. Officials at WLC admitted to selling the vouchers, which are issued free from the government to eligible renters.

== Insurance fraud case ==
WLC operated a drug detox program using "dry heat sweat therapy" in their Compton, California offices. In 2015, executive director Hanan Islam and three of her adult children—including Rizza Islam—were arrested and charged for Medi-Cal fraud and insurance fraud for billing for this detox program.

Two school principals and a coach were also charged; all three were fired and two pleaded guilty. Two of Hanan Islam's daughters pleaded guilty, Hanan Islam died before trial, and the state dropped charges for the last remaining defendant (Rizza Islam) on the first day of trial in 2023. The insurance fraud occurred between 2010 and 2013.
