= Safe Environment Fund =

Organisation of the church of Scientology

The Safe Environment Fund was a Church of Scientology organization that raised funds for the defense of the Scientology executives indicted (and ultimately convicted) for their role in a criminal conspiracy against the United States Government and numerous other public and private organizations and individuals. The term "safe environment" was used by Scientology founder L. Ron Hubbard to refer to his conception of Scientology's organizations as a bulwark against what he described as "the dangerous environment of the wog [non-Scientology] world, of injustice, sudden dismissals, war, atomic bombs" which would "only persist and trouble us if we fail to spread our safe environment around the world."

== History ==
According to a petition submitted to the United States District Court for the District of Columbia in May 1980, the Safe Environment Fund had "undertaken the responsibility of contributing toward the defendant's legal expenses in this case. The Safe Environment Fund is a charitable organization, associated with the Church of Scientology, and the monies needed for the defendant's legal defense have to be raised by public contributions and donations." The petition requested permission for Jane Kember and Mo Budlong, two executives of the Church's Guardian's Office who had been extradited from England to face trial in the United States, to appear at fund-raising events "to be held in various places in the United States". The petition was opposed by the government, which described the Safe Environment Fund as "an integral arm of the Church of Scientology created for the sole purpose of paying for the legal fees of the defendants, thus hiding the fact that the church was paying for these expenses."

The Safe Environment Fund was later described by former Guardian's Office staff member Janie Peterson, who had worked in the Las Vegas Guardian Office until 1979. Testifying at the City of Clearwater Commission Hearing on the Church of Scientology on May 8, 1982, she reported that the Church told its members that the indictment of Scientology executives "was a big conspiracy by the government, that these — that was the reason these people were indicted, and that these people had, at no time, ever done anything wrong or not legal, that the government had no information that was correct. We were not told that they were, indeed, guilty of the crimes or that they even later pleaded guilty to the crimes." It was said to have raised "many, many thousands of dollars", though Church members involved in fund-raising were instructed "to tell any public official, the press, or anyone that we did not operate the Safe Environment Fund while we were on what's called Post Time; in other words, we were to say that it was totally separate, it was something we were doing on our time. We were not allowed to say that, in fact, it was a big part of our job." The Safe Environment Fund raised money from Scientologists through "rallies and meetings and that type of thing and [they would] talk about the indictees and how much money it was costing. And then the people were to give donations."

Another fund-raising route was described by L. Ron Hubbard's former biographical researcher, Gerry Armstrong, during his defense in the 1984 case Church of Scientology v. Gerald Armstrong. After reading that Hubbard was responsible for writing the screenplay for the 1941 movie Dive Bomber, one of the Safe Environment Fund personnel came up with the idea of holding screenings of the film to raise money for the fund. Armstrong double-checked the provenance of the film to ensure that the fund's attribution of its authorship to Hubbard was accurate and found – despite Hubbard's claims to the contrary – that two other screenwriters were credited with the film. By this time, however, the fund had already put up posters and "glossy promotional items [in which] L. Ron Hubbard was noted as the man behind the scenes", and people had paid money to view the film.

== See also ==
- Operation Snow White
- Office of Special Affairs
- List of Guardian's Office operations
