= Progressive Academy =

K-12 school in Edmonton, Alberta (est. 1984)

- Edmonton, Alberta; Canada

Information
- Type: Private
- Established: 1984
- Grades: Pre-k - 12
- Website: www.proacad.ca

Progressive Academy is a private day school in Edmonton, Alberta, Canada founded in 1984. The school teaches students from pre-school to Grade 12. It is accredited and funded by Alberta Education (Alberta's provincial department of education).

Progressive Academy is a member of the Association for Independent Schools and Colleges of Alberta (AISCA), which is an advocacy organization for private schools in Alberta.

Progressive Academy's Junior Kindergarten program is licensed by Alberta Child and Family Services to operate a daycare facility and an out-of-school care program. The Junior Kindergarten and out-of-school care programs are also accredited by the Alberta Association for the Accreditation of Early Learning and Care Services (AELCS), on behalf of the Alberta Government.
