= 2020 Florida Republican presidential primary =

- March 17, 2020

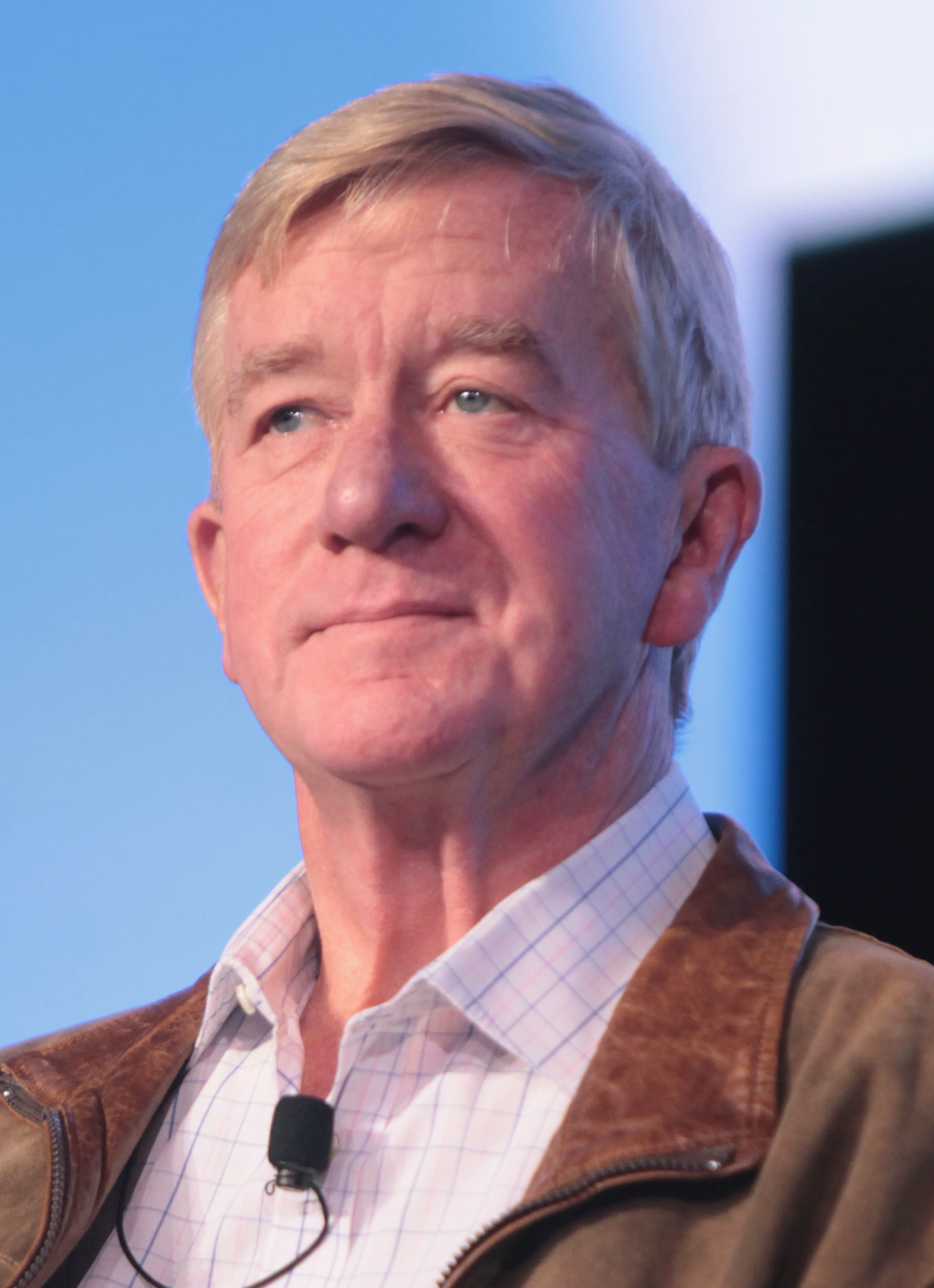
| Candidate | Donald Trump | Bill Weld |
| Home state | Florida | Massachusetts |
| Delegate count | 122 | – |
| Popular vote | 1,162,984 | 39,319 |
| Percentage | 93.79% | 3.2% |

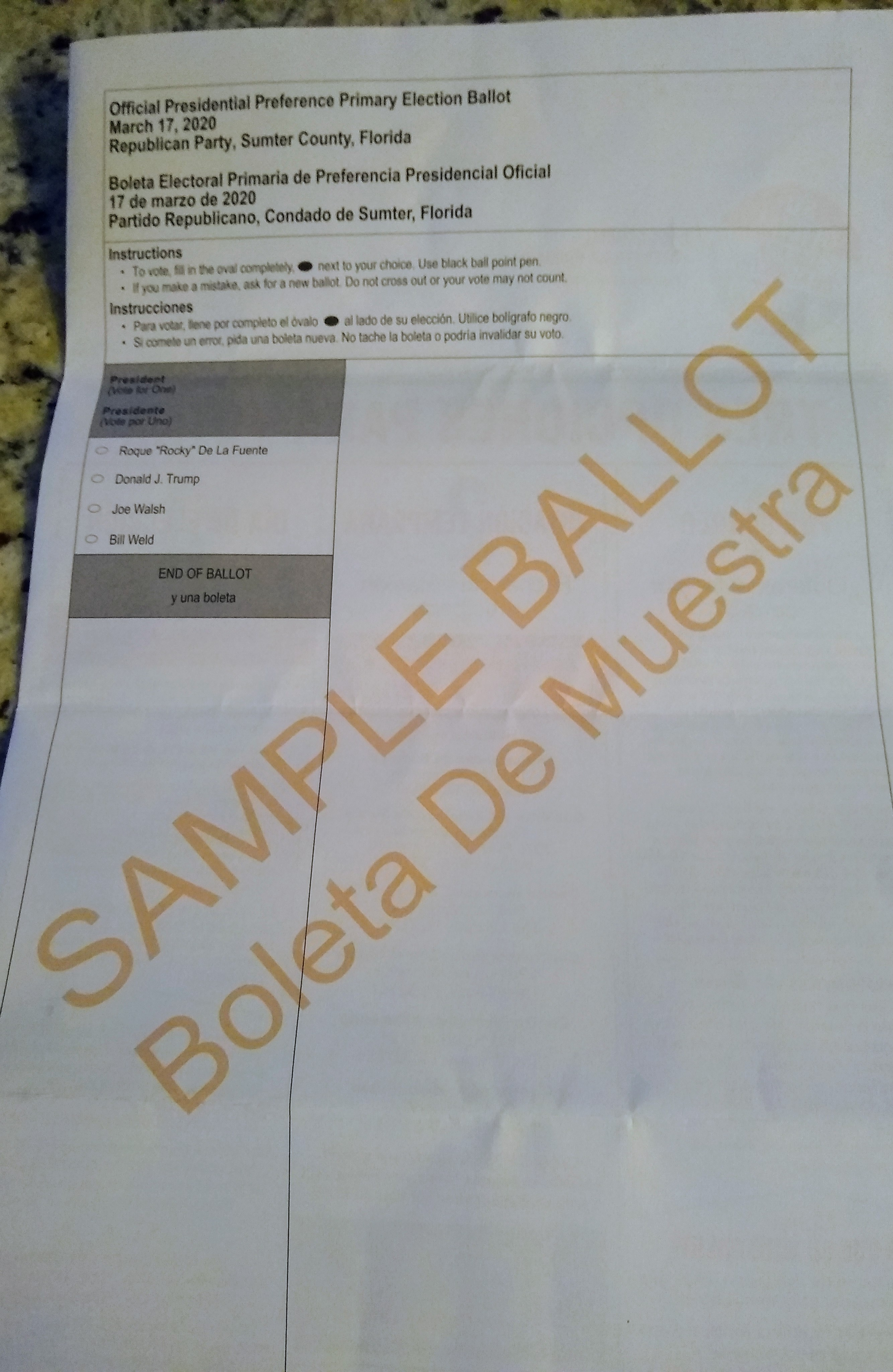
A Republican Party sample ballot from Sumter County, Florida.

The 2020 Florida Republican presidential primary took place on March 17, 2020, as one of the three contests scheduled on that date in the Republican Party presidential primaries for the 2020 presidential election.

== Results ==
Incumbent United States president Donald Trump was challenged by three candidates: businessman and perennial candidate Rocky De La Fuente of California, former congressman Joe Walsh of Illinois, and former governor Bill Weld of Massachusetts. Walsh withdrew from the race prior to the primary.

2020 Florida Republican presidential primary
| Candidate | Votes | % | Estimated delegates |
|---|---|---|---|
| Donald Trump (incumbent) | 1,162,984 | 93.79 | 122 |
| Bill Weld | 39,319 | 3.17 | |
| Joe Walsh (withdrawn) | 25,464 | 2.05 | |
| Rocky De La Fuente | 12,172 | 0.98 | |
| Total | 1,239,939 | 100% | 122 |

=== Results by county ===
2020 Florida Republican primary (results per county)
| County | Donald Trump | | Bill Weld | | Joe Walsh | | Rocky De La Fuente | | Total votes cast |
| County | Votes | % | Votes | % | Votes | % | Votes | % | Total votes cast |
|---|---|---|---|---|---|---|---|---|---|
| Alachua | 9,178 | 90.51 | 535 | 5.28 | 281 | 2.77 | 146 | 1.44 | 10,140 |
| Baker | 3,074 | 98.97 | 15 | 0.48 | 11 | 0.35 | 6 | 0.19 | 3,106 |
| Bay | 13,250 | 96.84 | 235 | 1.72 | 126 | 0.92 | 72 | 0.53 | 13,683 |
| Bradford | 2,756 | 97.63 | 25 | 0.89 | 28 | 0.99 | 14 | 0.50 | 2,823 |
| Brevard | 53,104 | 93.90 | 1,914 | 3.38 | 1,041 | 1.84 | 493 | 0.87 | 56,552 |
| Broward | 40,176 | 92.00 | 1,716 | 3.93 | 1,223 | 2.80 | 553 | 1.27 | 43,668 |
| Calhoun | 939 | 99.05 | 1 | 0.11 | 5 | 0.53 | 3 | 0.32 | 948 |
| Charlotte | 13,147 | 93.63 | 477 | 3.40 | 311 | 2.21 | 107 | 0.76 | 14,042 |
| Citrus | 18,556 | 95.35 | 480 | 2.47 | 289 | 1.49 | 135 | 0.69 | 19,460 |
| Clay | 17,750 | 95.51 | 392 | 2.11 | 316 | 1.70 | 126 | 0.68 | 18,584 |
| Collier | 34,863 | 93.85 | 1,379 | 3.71 | 609 | 1.64 | 298 | 0.80 | 37,149 |
| Columbia | 4,843 | 97.50 | 64 | 1.29 | 41 | 0.83 | 19 | 0.38 | 4,967 |
| DeSoto | 1,105 | 96.34 | 17 | 1.48 | 18 | 1.57 | 7 | 0.61 | 1,147 |
| Dixie | 1,440 | 98.77 | 9 | 0.62 | 2 | 0.14 | 7 | 0.48 | 1,458 |
| Duval | 50,953 | 94.74 | 1,381 | 2.57 | 979 | 1.82 | 467 | 0.87 | 53,780 |
| Escambia | 26,497 | 94.40 | 837 | 2.98 | 524 | 1.87 | 210 | 0.75 | 28,068 |
| Flagler | 10,308 | 95.60 | 237 | 2.20 | 161 | 1.49 | 76 | 0.70 | 10,782 |
| Franklin | 1,033 | 96.00 | 20 | 1.86 | 16 | 1.49 | 7 | 0.65 | 1,076 |
| Gadsden | 1,275 | 95.65 | 27 | 2.03 | 21 | 1.58 | 10 | 0.75 | 1,333 |
| Gilchrist | 1,695 | 96.53 | 26 | 1.48 | 25 | 1.42 | 10 | 0.57 | 1,756 |
| Glades | 901 | 96.47 | 14 | 1.50 | 12 | 1.28 | 7 | 0.75 | 934 |
| Gulf | 1,534 | 96.84 | 28 | 1.77 | 12 | 0.76 | 10 | 0.63 | 1,584 |
| Hamilton | 919 | 98.71 | 4 | 0.43 | 6 | 0.64 | 2 | 0.21 | 931 |
| Hardee | 1,525 | 97.51 | 10 | 0.64 | 17 | 1.09 | 12 | 0.77 | 1,564 |
| Hendry | 1,769 | 96.51 | 21 | 1.15 | 23 | 1.25 | 20 | 1.09 | 1,833 |
| Hernando | 17,258 | 95.42 | 368 | 2.03 | 312 | 1.73 | 148 | 0.82 | 18,086 |
| Highlands | 7,575 | 96.06 | 142 | 1.80 | 122 | 1.55 | 47 | 0.60 | 7,886 |
| Hillsborough | 68,940 | 92.93 | 2,657 | 3.58 | 1,646 | 2.22 | 939 | 1.27 | 74,182 |
| Holmes | 2,413 | 99.14 | 11 | 0.45 | 7 | 0.29 | 3 | 0.12 | 2,434 |
| Indian River | 14,629 | 93.70 | 541 | 3.47 | 319 | 2.04 | 123 | 0.79 | 15,612 |
| Jackson | 3,469 | 97.97 | 34 | 0.96 | 26 | 0.73 | 12 | 0.34 | 3,541 |
| Jefferson | 887 | 96.73 | 15 | 1.64 | 10 | 1.09 | 5 | 0.55 | 917 |
| Lafayette | 841 | 98.02 | 6 | 0.70 | 6 | 0.70 | 5 | 0.58 | 858 |
| Lake | 25,996 | 95.19 | 612 | 2.24 | 475 | 1.74 | 227 | 0.83 | 27,310 |
| Lee | 58,582 | 92.94 | 2,366 | 3.75 | 1,481 | 2.35 | 605 | 0.96 | 63,034 |
| Leon | 12,686 | 89.70 | 786 | 5.56 | 412 | 2.91 | 259 | 1.83 | 14,143 |
| Levy | 4,644 | 97.46 | 39 | 0.82 | 48 | 1.01 | 34 | 0.71 | 4,765 |
| Liberty | 438 | 98.87 | 0 | 0.00 | 2 | 0.45 | 3 | 0.68 | 443 |
| Madison | 1,457 | 97.79 | 17 | 1.14 | 10 | 0.67 | 6 | 0.40 | 1,490 |
| Manatee | 33,334 | 93.65 | 1,248 | 3.51 | 739 | 2.08 | 275 | 0.77 | 35,596 |
| Marion | 27,661 | 95.18 | 634 | 2.18 | 550 | 1.89 | 216 | 0.74 | 29,061 |
| Martin | 12,403 | 91.25 | 675 | 4.97 | 344 | 2.53 | 171 | 1.26 | 13,593 |
| Miami-Dade | 68,359 | 94.22 | 1,801 | 2.48 | 1,214 | 1.67 | 1,179 | 1.63 | 72,553 |
| Monroe | 5,745 | 91.85 | 254 | 4.06 | 169 | 2.70 | 87 | 1.39 | 6,255 |
| Nassau | 11,524 | 96.27 | 259 | 2.16 | 134 | 1.12 | 53 | 0.44 | 11,970 |
| Okaloosa | 17,330 | 93.78 | 580 | 3.14 | 401 | 2.17 | 169 | 0.91 | 18,480 |
| Okeechobee | 2,425 | 97.16 | 28 | 1.12 | 38 | 1.52 | 5 | 0.20 | 2,496 |
| Orange | 41,606 | 91.80 | 1,910 | 4.21 | 1,169 | 2.58 | 637 | 1.41 | 45,322 |
| Osceola | 13,931 | 93.40 | 430 | 2.88 | 334 | 2.24 | 220 | 1.48 | 14,915 |
| Palm Beach | 47,472 | 91.46 | 2,263 | 4.36 | 1,533 | 2.95 | 638 | 1.23 | 51,906 |
| Pasco | 35,678 | 94.59 | 968 | 2.57 | 782 | 2.07 | 292 | 0.77 | 37,720 |
| Pinellas | 72,450 | 90.89 | 3,699 | 4.64 | 2,558 | 3.21 | 1,005 | 1.26 | 79,712 |
| Polk | 38,493 | 95.34 | 959 | 2.38 | 638 | 1.58 | 284 | 0.70 | 40,374 |
| Putnam | 6,115 | 97.61 | 62 | 0.99 | 59 | 0.94 | 29 | 0.46 | 6,265 |
| Santa Rosa | 16,500 | 95.66 | 360 | 2.09 | 272 | 1.58 | 117 | 0.68 | 17,249 |
| Sarasota | 37,352 | 92.31 | 1,706 | 4.22 | 984 | 2.43 | 420 | 1.04 | 40,462 |
| Seminole | 27,009 | 93.00 | 1,127 | 3.88 | 578 | 1.99 | 328 | 1.13 | 29,042 |
| St. Johns | 24,171 | 94.93 | 688 | 2.70 | 406 | 1.59 | 198 | 0.78 | 25,463 |
| St. Lucie | 17,052 | 94.84 | 454 | 2.53 | 335 | 1.86 | 139 | 0.77 | 17,980 |
| Sumter | 21,897 | 96.44 | 452 | 1.99 | 257 | 1.13 | 99 | 0.44 | 22,705 |
| Suwannee | 4,494 | 98.38 | 30 | 0.66 | 34 | 0.74 | 10 | 0.22 | 4,568 |
| Taylor | 2,407 | 98.97 | 14 | 0.58 | 8 | 0.33 | 3 | 0.12 | 2,432 |
| Union | 1,043 | 98.58 | 6 | 0.57 | 4 | 0.38 | 5 | 0.47 | 1,058 |
| Volusia | 33,774 | 93.91 | 1,075 | 2.99 | 811 | 2.26 | 303 | 0.84 | 35,963 |
| Wakulla | 2,755 | 96.60 | 48 | 1.68 | 34 | 1.19 | 15 | 0.53 | 2,852 |
| Walton | 5,140 | 95.63 | 113 | 2.10 | 90 | 1.67 | 32 | 0.60 | 5,375 |
| Washington | 2,459 | 98.24 | 18 | 0.72 | 16 | 0.64 | 10 | 0.40 | 2,503 |
| Total | 1,162,984 | 93.79 | 39,319 | 3.17 | 25,464 | 2.05 | 12,172 | 0.98 | 1,239,939 |
