= Youth for Human Rights International =

Church of Scientology-run organization

Youth for Human Rights
- Formation: 2001
- Founder: Mary Shuttleworth
- Tax ID no.: 20-2661767
- Headquarters: 6331 Hollywood Blvd, Suite 720, Los Angeles, CA 90028
- Parent organization: United for Human Rights
- Affiliations: Church of Scientology
- Website: youthforhumanrights.org, humanrights.com

Youth for Human Rights is a program run by United for Human Rights, an American non-profit organization managed by Church of Scientology International. The organization promotes Scientology founder L. Ron Hubbard's writings on human rights and the United Nations Universal Declaration of Human Rights.

== History ==
Scientologist Mary Shuttleworth founded the program in August 2001 in coordination with the Church of Scientology International's Human Rights Office. Originally incorporated under the name "Youth for Human Rights International" in California in 2005, the name was changed to "United for Human Rights" in 2009 while retaining the brand "Youth for Human Rights". Websites for both United for Human Rights and Youth for Human Rights International list the same Taxpayer Identification Number, California corporation number, and business address.

== Activities and events ==
YHRI distributes materials related to its interpretation of the United Nations Universal Declaration of Human Rights and YHRI programs, to schoolchildren in a variety of developed nations, such as the United States, Australia, the United Kingdom and the Czech Republic. YHRI is also active in Germany. In Belgium, it handed out a prize, and also held an awards ceremony in Bulgaria for the same prize. YHRI awarded one prize to a Chinese actress, who promoted the group's views on her web site, and another to a young Israeli Scientologist who screened the film, UNITED, and distributed YHRI materials in his school. It held a conference in Zurich. It discussed plans to lecture and distribute its materials to schoolchildren in Ghana and Liberia. It advocated lower school fees in Uganda, and held a peace rally in Nigeria. In South Africa, Mary Shuttleworth's country of origin, it is pushing for a "human rights month." The organization's work is supported by the actor and Scientologist Tom Cruise and cooperates with human rights organizations, such as, allegedly, local chapters of Amnesty International. According to the Frankfurter Allgemeine Zeitung, neither Amnesty in Berlin nor Amnesty International headquarters in London had knowledge of any such collaboration and Amnesty International, as of March 2013, has been removed from the list of collaborators on the YHRI website.

In 2005, Youth for Human Rights International organized a conference at a Los Angeles High School. Stephen Strachan, principal of Jordan High School, said that although he knew some of the organizers were Scientologists, he did not know of YHRI's relationship to the church until the Church of Scientology was listed on publicity materials as a co-sponsor. After learning of the connection, an agreement was negotiated to remove any mention of the Church of Scientology from literature, and letters were sent to parents saying students would need permission to attend the event.

In 2007, YHRI led a pilot human rights course in the province of KwaZulu-Natal, South Africa, at which it distributed L. Ron Hubbard's tract The Way to Happiness to students ranging from 12 to 17 years old, and taught them Scientology jargon like the tone scale, while trying to enroll them in Drug Free Marshals, a Scientology organization like Narconon. An official in the provincial government said he hoped to bring it to the province's 4.44 million children.

== Criticism ==
In 2007, at a human rights youth forum organized by YHRI, in Sydney, Australia, three students from Canterbury Girls High School expressed concern at overt references to Scientology in the promotional materials. One said she felt "exploited." The Department of Education is looking into the students' complaints. However, David Clarke, a Liberal of the New South Wales upper house and a member of the Catholic group Opus Dei, said that he had also been unaware of any strong links between the youth forum and the Church of Scientology. But, Clarke added, "I'm a practising Catholic. There was no pushing as far as I could see of Scientology."

A German journalist has accused Scientology of false advertising through YHRI, recruiting members indirectly, and government officials in Germany have said YHRI serves as a cover-up tactic for Scientology.

The Florida Holocaust Museum complained that YHRI's connection to Scientology was not disclosed when they worked with them to organize a human rights march in St. Petersburg, Florida in March 2007.

In response, organizers claimed that while the Church of Scientology supported their group, the event was not created to promote Scientology. However, the Herald reported that, on the materials handed out at the event in Australia, L.Ron Hubbard's image and quotes figured more prominently than those of such activists as Martin Luther King and Mahatma Gandhi.

In 2009, Australia's Victoria government "told its schools not to distribute materials by a Scientology-funded group called Youth for Human Rights after it was revealed it organised a year 9 art prize."

Ursula Caberta, the Commissioner for the Scientology Task Force of the Hamburg Interior Authority, a Scientology watchdog group, stated the YHRI is one of a number of Scientology-linked groups that mask their connection to the church and seek to attract and recruit the young.

In 1995, the Hamburg Senate released a report on Scientology, describing its structure and the dangers it presented to individuals and society. One passage, citing Scientology documents, clarified the role of all organizations, which, like YHRI, are linked to the church.

In an internal memo, Scientology described the function of affiliate organizations: "All organizations and groups form a global network. Each one has its own individual role and responsibilities. But all service organizations have the goal to draw attention to L.Ron Hubbard's technology and deliver it to the public." Thus, each activity, however distantly it is related to Scientology, fits into a long-term strategic plan, which is ultimately steered by the highest management.

== Scientology, YHRI And Human Rights in Europe ==
According to the official Scientology website, YHRI is part of its overall campaign. YHRI, known in German as "Jugend für Menschenrechte," is active in both Switzerland and Germany, organizing human rights conferences for youth to promote religious tolerance. Referring to the campaign, Antje Blumenthal, a member of the German parliament, expressed concern that the good intentions of the young were being misused.

The governments of France and Germany have investigated Scientology in regard to human rights violations, investigations the Scientology organization calls discriminatory.

== See also ==
- Village Suisse ONG
