= The Way to Happiness =

Scientology front group

The Way to Happiness Foundation International
- Logo of foundation
- Type: Non-profit organization
- Headquarters: 201 E. Broadway, Glendale, California
- Official language: English
- Parent organization: Association for Better Living and Education (ABLE)
- Affiliations: Church of Scientology
- Website: The Way to Happiness

The Way to Happiness is a 1980 booklet written by science-fiction author and Scientology founder L. Ron Hubbard listing 21 moral precepts. The booklet is distributed by The Way to Happiness Foundation International, a Scientology-related nonprofit organization founded in 1984.

The Way to Happiness is used as part of Scientology's Criminon rehabilitation program and is promoted by Scientology celebrities. The unsolicited distribution of personalised copies of the booklet to schools and mayors' offices has caused controversy, and while it is promoted as secular in nature, critics have stated that it includes ideas that are specific to Scientology, and is used as a recruiting tool. The booklet has been translated into 70 languages.

== Foundation ==
The Way to Happiness Foundation International is a non-profit 501(c)(3), incorporated in 1984. Headquartered at 201 East Broadway, Glendale, California, the foundation coordinates the activities of the Way to Happiness international network, including continental and national offices, associates and local groups. The Way to Happiness Foundation International is a division of the Association for Better Living and Education (ABLE), and is a "Scientology-related entity" under the 1993 IRS Closing Agreement.

== Booklet ==
The Way to Happiness booklet contains a set of 21 precepts, which were written by L. Ron Hubbard, the founder of Scientology. The precepts are:

1. Take care of yourself
2. Be temperate
3. Don't be promiscuous
4. Love and help children
5. Honor and help your parents
6. Set a good example
7. Seek to live with the truth
8. Do not murder
9. Don't do anything illegal
10. Support a government designed and run for all the people
11. Do not harm a person of good will
12. Safeguard and improve your environment
13. Do not steal
14. Be worthy of trust
15. Fulfill your obligations
16. Be industrious
17. Be competent
18. Respect the religious beliefs of others
19. Try not to do things to others that you would not like them to do to you
20. Try to treat others as you would want them to treat you
21. Flourish and prosper

The code is not limited to negative prohibition of actions that are bad, (stealing, killing, promiscuity, illegalities) but also the positive advisement of good actions ("care of oneself, temperateness, respect for parents, aid for children, truthfulness, safeguard of environment, etc.") It was first published in 1981 by Regent House, Los Angeles as a 48-page paper-covered booklet (ISBN 0-9605930-0-4). The book is frequently given out by Scientologists. A campaign in the early 1990s to distribute the book in United States schools was described in Church of Scientology publications as "the largest dissemination project in Scientology history" and "the bridge between broad society and Scientology." A song titled "The Way to Happiness" appears on the music album The Road to Freedom, with music and lyrics by Hubbard.

The Way to Happiness forms the core of the Church of Scientology prison program Criminon. It is also used in the Scientology-affiliated organization Narconon – all clients receive a pamphlet of The Way to Happiness when they begin the program. Volunteer Ministers, a Scientology-affiliated organization which responds to disaster scenes, distributes The Way to Happiness pamphlets, and did so in the wake of the 2004 Indian Ocean earthquake, and the 2007 Virginia Tech massacre. The Scientology organization Concerned Businessmen's Association of America (CBAA) has also distributed The Way to Happiness, though representatives of the group have denied connections to Scientology. A 1993 article in Newsweek described cases where schools in Bellflower, California and Brooklyn, New York were influenced by CBAA to use The Way to Happiness in their schools, without knowing of the connections to Scientology. A 1990 Los Angeles Times article described the situation of a school in Fresno, California, where CBAA representatives refused to sponsor a contest at the school if The Way to Happiness pamphlet was not distributed. The booklet has been distributed to hotels.

== Promoted by celebrities ==
Scientologist Nancy Cartwright, the voice actor for Bart Simpson, mailed 1 million copies of The Way to Happiness booklet to residents of San Fernando Valley, California in December 2007. Cartwright told the Daily News of Los Angeles: "The mailing was from me to the San Fernando Valley community, the highest gang-infested area of Los Angeles. I thought it would make an impact, give someone a tool in order to make their lives happier at home." Isaac Hayes distributed The Way to Happiness pamphlets at his jazz performances in 2005.

Tom Cruise has distributed The Way to Happiness pamphlets, and passed out brochures embossed with his name at the elementary school where the 2005 movie War of the Worlds was filmed. He also gave copies of the pamphlet to managers of United International Pictures, the company which distributed War of the Worlds overseas. In a Church of Scientology-produced promotional video which appeared on YouTube in January 2008, Cruise cites "the way to happiness" as one of the benefits of Scientology: "When you're a Scientologist and you drive by an accident, you know you have to do something about it, because you know you're the only one who can really help," said Cruise. "We are the way to happiness. We can bring peace and unite cultures." Actor Miles Fisher parodies this quote by Cruise, in a scene in the 2008 film Superhero Movie. Fisher's character in the film states that he can "eat planets" and that he is "the way to happiness".

== Courses ==
The Church of Scientology offers two courses based on The Way to Happiness: "The Way to Happiness Course", done at a Church organization or mission and "The Way to Happiness Extension Course", which can be done at home. There is also the "Happiness Rundown" which is a Scientology procedure of a "Rundown" including auditing.

== Controversy ==
=== Deceptive and misleading distribution ===
In 1992, teachers in Anchorage, Alaska found copies of The Way to Happiness in their school mailboxes accompanied by a letter inviting the teachers to order more copies and distribute them to their students. Parents complained to the school district, and the school districts director of secondary education, Bill Mell, instructed school principals to tell teachers not to order The Way to Happiness. Mell told the Anchorage Daily News: "I don't know that it went to every teacher ... It looks as if they got a hold of the teachers' mailing list." A local businessman and Scientologist who was a member of the Concerned Businessmen's Association of America organization paid for the books to be distributed to the schools, and told the Anchorage Daily News that he believed both The Way to Happiness and the Concerned Businessmen's Association of America were not affiliated with the Church of Scientology.

At a 2005 fundraiser for the Boys & Girls Clubs of Clearwater, Florida, attendants found The Way to Happiness booklets in their goodie bags. The booklets contained the insignia of Boys & Girls Clubs on the front cover, and instructions on the back cover stating that additional copies could be obtained at the Boys & Girls Clubs of the Suncoast facilities. Carl Lavender, executive director of the Boys & Girls Clubs of the Suncoast, said that this usage of the Boys & Girls Clubs was unauthorized: "...I'm not pleased. You can't produce materials with our logo on it unless I give permission. We are going to collect all of them back and have them discarded." Joanie Sigal of the Scientology volunteer group Clearwater Community Volunteers, and a member of the Clearwater Boys & Girls Club's board of managers, had originally suggested adding the Club's insignia and distributing the booklets, and requested that the corporate board officially endorse the booklet. Executive director Lavender denied the request, stating: "The booklet ends as of today ... There needs to be a lesson. This cannot happen."

In 2005, Commander Mike Downing of the Los Angeles Police Department complained that "the Church of Scientology forged his endorsement on The Way To Happiness Web site, prompting the LAPD to disavow any endorsement of Scientology and The Way To Happiness."

In 2007, The Way to Happiness Foundation produced and distributed pamphlets with sample endorsements from the mayors of Dallas, Texas and San Francisco, California. The books were sent to mayor's offices, accompanied by a letter asking mayors to purchase copies of the books for distribution in their city. The mayor of Dallas did not appreciate this unauthorized usage of the mayor's logo and the official seal of the city of Dallas, stating: "Clearly we were not very comfortable and did not think it was appropriate to use the seal of the city of Dallas, the mayor's logo or my name on something we were not aware of." According to a report in The Dallas Morning News, the city attorney's office of Dallas looked into possible options of response regarding the matter.

Unauthorized use of the logo of the City of San Francisco, and image of its mayor, Gavin Newsom, on The Way to Happiness pamphlet, October 2007.

Similarly, in San Francisco, California, the mayor's office also received a boxful of the booklets and voiced displeasure with the unauthorized usage of the mayor's image, logo, and the seal of the city. According to a report by the Associated Press, the city ordered the Scientology group to stop using an unauthorized picture of Mayor Gavin Newsom on its promotional pamphlets. An official spokesman for the mayor of San Francisco released a statement, saying: "The mayor does not support the unauthorized use of his image or the city seal on this booklet." The city attorney for San Francisco wrote a letter to "The Way to Happiness Foundation", citing California state law, which prohibits deceptive and misleading advertising that could create an appearance that the pamphlets are from a government agency. The city attorney also cited San Francisco law, writing that the Board of Supervisors must approve any commercial use of the city's official seal.

In Winnipeg, Manitoba a box of pamphlets was delivered to the mayor's office with the official City of Winnipeg logo and the image of mayor Sam Katz. No legal action was taken: "This is obviously a sample sent to our office and it was not approved or paid for by our office... If material was being distributed on our behalf with a false endorsement, it would be a different story."

In a 2007 published US embassy cable, Ursula Caberta, the Director of the Working Group on Scientology (created by the Hamburg State Parliament to address all "destructive groups" which endanger society), obtained a booklet that contained the Hamburg mayor's photograph and signature, yet was actually a publication from The Way to Happiness Foundation. Caberta contended that "Scientology regularly used misleading methods to fool individuals into joining and said that such booklets had been distributed to other German cities. For someone unfamiliar with Scientology publications, the booklet looked very much like information brochures from the City of Hamburg."

In October 2007, uniformed police officers visiting Whyalla High School in Australia distributed a booklet called "Whyalla High School presents the way to happiness, a common-sense guide for better living", against the school's guidelines for religious education. One parent told the Adelaide, Australia paper The Advertiser she had specifically told the school not to give religious instruction to her children, and other parents mistakenly thought that the booklets were distributed by the Education Department because Whyalla High School was displayed on the booklet's cover.

In March 2008, The Way to Happiness Foundation agreed to stop sending thousands of unsolicited, personalized copies of the booklet to elected officials in Florida after hundreds of them complained. Booklets sent to mayors had the mayor's name on the front, and an endorsement from the mayor on the back, along with the Florida state flag and the address of the town hall. A note advised prospective readers to contact town hall if they had further questions. The Foundation said it had sent about 2,800 mailings, comprising a total of 250,000 booklets, to Florida mayors, businesses and community groups. Following the complaints, the Foundation explained that the books were only samples meant to encourage the recipients to buy further copies, and said that it would henceforth send out unpersonalized stock copies only. Unlike many mayors who were reported to have been displeased at seeing their names on the personalized samples, Anthony Masiello, the mayor of Buffalo from 1994 to 2005, did authorize distribution of the booklet, complete with the city seal and a picture of the city hall, after a Scientology center opened in Buffalo in 2003.

=== False claims of affiliation ===
In a speech given at a New Year's event in 2007, David Miscavige, the current leader of the Church of Scientology, claimed that the distribution of the booklet is aided by "corporate tie-ins", mentioning 7-Eleven in Taiwan, Coca-Cola Pakistan, Philips Electronics in Pakistan, and Dell in Africa as companies who supported the Foundation as part of their efforts to address their "third-world image problems". A video of the speech was released to YouTube in February 2008. A spokesman for Dell told the Los Angeles Times that they had researched the matter with their colleagues in Africa and elsewhere and found "no evidence that this is accurate ... it's not our practice to disseminate religious materials of any kind." Representatives from Philips and 7-Eleven told the Los Angeles Times that they were unaware of any such association, but said they were looking into the matter.

=== Denying affiliation with Scientology ===
The Way to Happiness pamphlet caused controversy in Sderot, Israel in February 2008, when a group calling itself the "Association for Prosperity and Security in the Middle East" became active in the city. The non-profit group sent e-mails to social workers in Sderot, offering to help people cope with Kassam rocket attacks the city has been enduring. Dalia Yosef, head of an umbrella psychological organization in the region called Hosen Center, received complaints from multiple social workers about the e-mails, and stated: "We intend to investigate this association, as we do every group that offers social and psychological services in Sderot". In an e-mail response to The Jerusalem Post, the Association for Prosperity stated: "We are unaware of any Scientology activity whatsoever being offered to Sderot residents. In general, regarding your question on Scientology activity in Sderot or elsewhere, you should contact the official representatives of the religion and receive their response".

A representative of Scientology told The Jerusalem Post that the director-general of the Association for Prosperity was a Scientologist, as were most individuals in the organization, but that some were not, and said that the principles found in The Way to Happiness were "totally different" from Scientology. The organization stated: "Claiming our organization is connected with Scientology just because our director-general studied Scientology is like saying that other nonprofits are hi-tech because volunteers work in hi-tech." Director-general of the Israeli Center for Cult Victims Ayelet Kedem described the organization as a front group for Scientology: "Hiding behind a front organization is a common tactic... The idea is to create a positive image by obscuring the connection with Scientology... Later, people who undergo free workshops are convinced that they must correct flaws in their personality by taking Scientology courses. Those who are hooked end up giving all their possessions to the Church of Scientology".

In Illinois in 2011, Rep. Dan Burke (D-Chicago) sponsored a resolution endorsing the "Good Choices" program, which is based on The Way to Happiness, as one of a number of suitable tools for teaching character, morals and values. Nancy Cartwright submitted testimony to a House education committee, stating the program had "nothing to do with religion." Opponents voiced concerns about the program's links to the Scientology belief system, and said that promoting its use in schools would violate the principle of the separation of church and state. Burke accepted that the program's Scientology links were more substantial than he had thought. He said he would work on the resolution and present it again at a later date. The reporter stated, "Not even the voice of Bart Simpson could convince Illinois lawmakers to approve a resolution aimed at teaching character in public schools because of its link to the Church of Scientology."

=== Validity of secular claim ===
The Way to Happiness is described by the foundation as "a non-religious moral code, based entirely on common sense, which is having profound effects around the world". The religious scholar Benjamin Beit-Hallahmi states he has performed an extensive search in the history of religions, and has been unable to find a single case in which "a religion was publicly propagating a secular version of its ethical system". To illustrate the uniqueness of the booklet, he gave the following analogy: "How about a secular, improved version of the Ten Commandments?"

The text uses key words and concepts taken directly from Scientology beliefs – for example that "survival" is the fundamental point of life, that you can be truly happy if you become the "cause" of your own actions, and that the truth is "what is true for you." A Brooklyn school principal who at first appreciated the booklet as "a values-oriented book about righteousness and peace" stopped using it after becoming aware that it contained "an undercurrent of a religious nature."

Critics argue that The Way to Happiness is primarily a recruiting tool for the church. According to Vicki Aznaran, former Inspector General of the Church's highest ecclesiastical organization, the Religious Technology Center, The Way to Happiness Foundation is "a front group to get people into Scientology" and the book is designed "to make Scientology palatable to the masses."

== See also ==
- Bibliography of Scientology
- Scientology beliefs and practices
- Church of Spiritual Technology
- Concerned Businessmen's Association of America
- Volunteer Ministers
- Youth for Human Rights International
