= Delphian School =

School in Oregon, United States

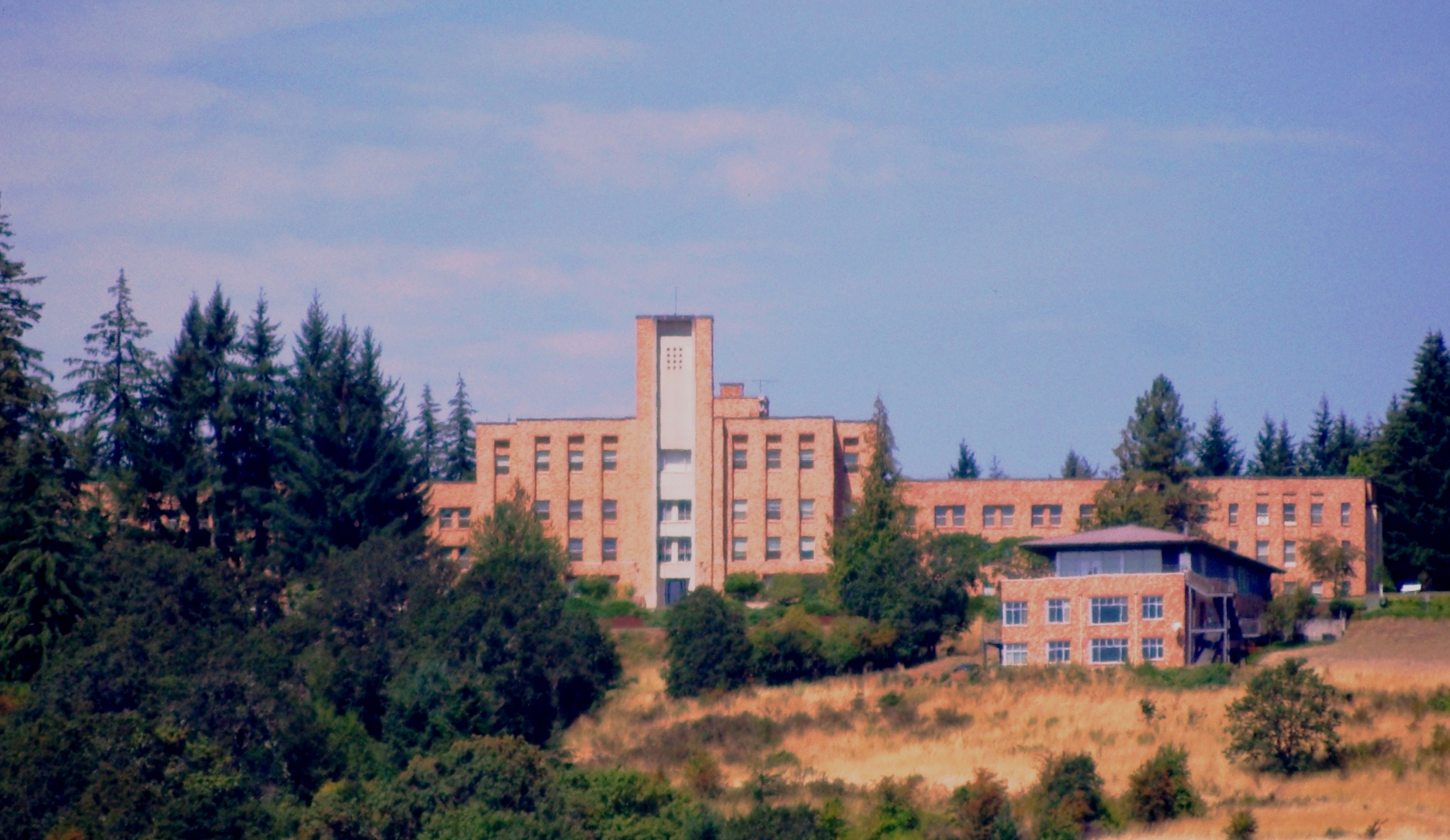

Location
- 20950 SW Rock Creek Road; Sheridan, Yamhill County, Oregon 97378; United States; 45.107282°N 123.44801°W

Information
- Type: Private school
- Opened: 1976
- CEEB code: 381071
- NCES School ID: 01161668
- Head of school: Trevor Ott
- Grades: K–12
- Enrollment: 204 (2024)
- Campus type: Rural
- Colors: Green and white
- Athletics conference: OSAA Northwest League 2A-1
- Team name: Dragons
- Accreditation: NWAIS, AdvancED
- Affiliations: Delphi Schools; Applied Scholastics
- Website: www.delphian.org

Delphian School is a private, co-educational K–12 boarding and day school near Sheridan, Oregon, US. It is operated by Delphi Schools on a 720-acre campus. Founded in 1976, Delphian primarily teaches children in grades 8–12, with most living on campus either full or part-time. The campus was formerly a Jesuit novitiate and includes a historic Art Deco building designed by Poole & McGonigle in 1933.

Delphian School is a member of the Oregon Federation of Independent Schools (OFIS), which is a school membership organization that serves as the voice for Oregon private schools. The school participates in the Oregon School Activities Association's (OSAA) Northwest League, 2A classification, for girls and boys sports. It uses study techniques created by Scientology founder L. Ron Hubbard, known as Study Tech. Accredited by Cognia and the Northwest Association of Independent Schools, Delphian curriculum is self-paced without traditional grades or grade levels.

== Campus and history ==
In the fall of 1976, Delphian School opened on the site of a former Jesuit novitiate near Sheridan, Oregon. The main building on campus is a four-story, Art Deco-style building with a brick exterior designed by Poole & McGonigle and built in 1933 for the Jesuit house.

In 1974, the order sold the building and surrounding acreage to Delphian. The former novitiate was then converted to a boarding school.

Opening in 1976, Delphian School created a curriculum for grades K-12. There were about 60 students in the school's first year. Two years later in 1978 the school had 120 students; tuition was $4,500 for boarding students and $2,800 for non-boarders. In the mid-1980s the campus was considered as a possible location for a federal prison. The Sheridan Federal Correctional Institution opened in 1989 in another location in the area.

The headquarters for Delphi Schools, Inc. are located at Delphian School, which is the founding school.

During school closures due to COVID-19, Delphian School offered free online classes.

== Academics ==
Delphian School uses Study Tech; techniques created by Scientology-founder L. Ron Hubbard and licensed through Applied Scholastics. The curriculum includes reading, writing, and arithmetic, as well as study, communication, research, and reasoning skills.

The school is the location of Heron Books, which published textbooks and materials using Hubbard's educational techniques (the Delphi Curriculum).

Delphian School is a member of the Oregon Federation of Independent Schools (OFIS), an organization that works to limit government influence on school choice. The OFIS's current director, Mark Siegel, also acts as the school's assistant headmaster. The school is an accredited member of the Northwest Association of Independent Schools, and an accredited member school of Cognia, a standards-based accreditation body.

== Activities and athletics ==
Delphian School's sports team is known as the "Dragons". The school participates in the Oregon School Activities Association's (OSAA) Northwest League, 2A classification, for girls and boys sports: basketball, tennis, cross country, track and field, boys soccer, volleyball, and cheerleading; and for such other activities as speech and debate, solo music, and choir.

Delphian School started its cheerleading squad in 2013. In 2016, they won the Class 3A/2A/1A state cheerleading title with an overall judged score of 160.70.

In 2014, the Delphian choir tied for the OSAA Choir State Championship. That year three school soccer players were named to the All-State team.

At the 2022 Mountain Valley Conference district track and field championship, the girls team won multiple disciplines including the 100 and 200 meters, 300 hurdles, and 4×400 relay. The boys team placed first overall, winning the 100, 200, 800, 1500 and 3000 meters, 300 hurdles, and the 4×100 and 4×400 relays.

== Delphi Schools, Inc. ==
Delphian School is the founding school of Delphi Schools, Inc. and also serves as its headquarters.

=== Other Delphi campuses ===
As of 2025, other campuses run by Delphi Schools, Inc. are located in Los Angeles, California (est. 1980); the Boston area (est. 1980); and Clearwater, Florida (est. 1984). Previously, there was a school in Chicago, and three others in California: Santa Monica (2007–2014), Sacramento (1980–2004), and the San Francisco Bay Area (est. 1991).

Delphi Academy of Boston is a Pre-K through eighth grade private school in Milton, Massachusetts.

Delphi Academy of Florida is a K–12 day school located at 1831 Drew St, Clearwater, Florida.

Delphi Academy of Los Angeles serves preschool through high school in Lake View Terrace, California. In October 2024, Delphi Academy of Los Angeles was named in a lawsuit by a former student who alleged that as a 13-year-old he was "groomed and repeatedly sexually molested" by Delphi's athletic director, a man who several years later was convicted of sexual abuse of multiple victims and was sentenced to over 17 years in prison. The 2024 lawsuit alleged that Delphi's head knew of abuses yet failed to take action, fire, or report the incidents to police or authorities. Instead, Delphi waited until the man's contract expired and then recommended him for a position at another school, at which he continued to sexually abuse minor boys.

=== Heron Books ===
Delphi's publishing arm operates under the assumed business name of Heron Books, whose offices are located on the Delphian School campus. It was incorporated in 1973 as the Delphi Foundation and changed to the present name in 1987. Delphi Schools says that its schools teach using "The Delphi Program". The Study Technology teaching method is licensed through Applied Scholastics. Several Delphi schools use the Heron Basics Program of Heron Books for instruction.
