= Association for Better Living and Education =

Organization associated with Church of Scientology

Association for Better Living and Education International
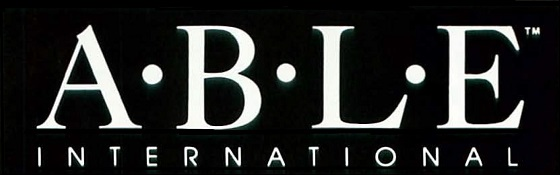
- Abbreviation: ABLE
- Formation: 1988
- Type: Advocacy
- Legal status: Non-profit
- Purpose: Secular promotion of Scientology concepts
- Headquarters: 7065 Hollywood Blvd, Los Angeles, California
- Coordinates: 34.101723°N 118.343791°W
- President: Rena Weinberg
- Publication: Inroads
- Parent organization: Church of Scientology
- Subsidiaries: Applied Scholastics; Criminon; Narconon; The Way to Happiness
- Affiliations: Scientology
- Website: able.org
- Formerly called: Association for Better Living and Education (1988-2000)

The Association for Better Living and Education (ABLE) is a non-profit front organization headquartered in Los Angeles, California, established and operated by the Church of Scientology. It states that it is "dedicated to creating a better future for children and communities." It promotes secular uses of L. Ron Hubbard's works, and has been classified as a "Scientology-related entity". Founded in 1988, ABLE's main office is located at 7065 Hollywood Boulevard, the former headquarters for the Screen Actors Guild.

== Programs ==
ABLE is an umbrella organization which manages the four entities:

- Applied Scholastics, educational programs based on study technology
- Criminon, a rehabilitation program for prisoners
- Narconon, a drug rehabilitation program
- The Way to Happiness Foundation, dedicated to disseminating Hubbard's "non-religious moral code".

== Criticism ==
Although various Scientology groups are registered as legally separate corporations and entities, critics note this has no bearing on whether or not they are controlled by the Church of Scientology. Studytech.org, a Scientology watchdog site, notes: "Applied Scholastics is indeed a legally separate corporation. However, it has so many ties to the Church of Scientology and its corporate alter ego, the Church of Spiritual Technology, that it cannot be regarded as being anything other than a Scientology subsidiary.

Nanette Asimov, reporter for the San Francisco Chronicle, in an article critical of ABLE and Narconon, summed it up this way:

A popular anti-drug program provided free to schools in San Francisco and elsewhere teaches concepts straight out of the Church of Scientology, including medical theories that some addiction experts described as "irresponsible" and "pseudoscience." As a result, students are being introduced to some beliefs and methods of Scientology without their knowledge.

ABLE and its groups were included in the 1993 closing agreement between the IRS and the Church of Scientology, and are classified as "Scientology-related entities".

== See also ==
- Applied Scholastics
- Criminon
- Narconon
- The Way to Happiness
