= Criminon =

Scientology rehab program for prisoners

- Official logo
- Formation: 2000
- Type: Penological rehabilitation program
- Headquarters: United States
- Affiliations: Scientology
- Website: criminon.org
- Remarks: Part of Association for Better Living and Education network

Criminon is a program for rehabilitating prisoners using L. Ron Hubbard's teachings. Criminon International, a non-profit, public-benefit corporation managing the Criminon program, was spawned from Narconon International in 2000, and is part of Association for Better Living and Education's public outreach programs. Criminon is promoted by the Church of Scientology International. Independent experts contend that methods used by the program are not supported by any scientific studies.

Second Chance, another prison-based rehabilitation program for inmates, is closely related to Criminon, from which it licenses the techniques and materials used in its program.

Criminon is said to be a prison-based version of Narconon, as the Purification Rundown detoxification and training procedures are a part of both programs.

== Criminon's program ==
Criminon originated in the mid-1970s as an alternative name for the committee to Re-Involve Ex-Offenders, a Scientology group. The program sent correspondence materials to hundreds of prisoners at the high security California State Prison, Corcoran, beginning in 1990. Criminon is administered by the Association for Better Living and Education (ABLE), a nonprofit organization that administers Criminon, Narconon, and other "social betterment" programs.

The program includes courses with questions requiring written answers. The responses are evaluated by volunteers and the materials are donated, so the program is provided free to the state. Included in one pamphlet is an essay in which Scientology founder L. Ron Hubbard writes, "There is not one institutional psychiatrist alive who by ordinary criminal law could not be arraigned and convicted of extortion, mayhem, or murder."

Hubbard's 1981 booklet, The Way to Happiness, is an integral part of the program, setting forth precepts such as "Do not take harmful drugs", "Be faithful to your sexual partner", "Do not tell harmful lies", "Don't do anything illegal", "Do not steal", and "Do not murder".

Criminon is also available under the name Second Chance, which licenses the Criminon materials.

== Controversies ==
Some critics question the long-term success of Criminon's program citing a lack of independent, peer-reviewed studies. As Criminon's website notes, the core of the prison program is the booklet The Way to Happiness.

In 1997, Judge Stephen Rushing, a Pinellas County, Florida, judge, was criticized by other judges when he began sentencing defendants to a program called "Impulse Control" that was run by Criminon. Rushing said the people running the course promised they would not try to convert anyone. However the paper noted that many critics have suggested that Criminon was being used as a recruiting tool. Rushing stated that if the program turned out to be nothing but a ploy to promote Scientology, "I owe an apology to the people I put in that program."

Criminon has also been criticized for promoting Scientology's hostile view of psychiatry. A Criminon instruction manual found at California's Corcoran Prison in 2005 instructs the supervisors who are supposed to be helping the inmates to encourage them to stop taking any psychiatric medication. "Most jails and prisons have a staff psychiatrist that goes in daily and gives dosages of various and sundry mind-altering drugs to the inmates. Most of the time this is a ploy to keep the inmates sedated so that they don't cause trouble", the manual stated. While Criminon claimed that this manual was "outdated", the replacement manual still advised that if inmates seemed angry, it may be because "some of them are on psychiatric drugs and have strange side effects as a result." Professor Stephen A. Kent said that Scientology's goal "is to destroy psychiatry and replace it with Scientology's own treatments. Criminon is simply one of many Scientology organizations that hope to see this goal realized."

In 2006, in New Mexico, government funding for the Second Chance program was cut when information on the program and its connections came to light.

Then-Nevada assembly member Sharron Angle supported the use of "Second Chance Program" in 2003. Angle sponsored legislation aimed at placing this program in women's prisons in Nevada.

== See also ==
- Narconon
