= Study Technology =

Scientology teaching method by L. Ron Hubbard

- Type: Educational method in Scientology
- Description: A system of learning techniques
- Methods: Handling of misunderstood words, word clearing, demonstrations
- Role: To ensure study effectiveness of Scientology materials
- Associated controversies: Concerns about indoctrination, use in secular programs, ties to Scientology organizations

Study Technology, also called Study Tech, is a teaching method codified by L. Ron Hubbard, founder of Scientology. Study Technology is used by Scientologists in their training, and it is also marketed outside the Church of Scientology through its affiliated corporation Applied Scholastics, which presents Study Tech as a secular teaching method for any student or topic. However, the method has many critics, including former teachers, claiming that Study Technology and its associated schools are intrinsically linked with religious aspects of Scientology.

Hubbard wrote in a policy letter in 1972 that "Study Tech is our primary bridge to Society." Most Study Tech books include a two-page biography of Hubbard that does not mention his role in creating Scientology. Religious scholar J. Gordon Melton said that Hubbard wrote the Study Tech materials to help people who joined Scientology with a low level of literacy, and that the materials are used within the Church of Scientology “not to proselytize for the religion but to teach people how to read.”

== Theory ==
According to Study Tech, there are three barriers that prevent students from learning: "absence of mass", too steep a gradient, and the misunderstood word. According to Hubbard, each barrier produces a physiological response in the student such as yawning, or feeling bored or frustrated. In accordance with L. Ron Hubbard's beliefs, the method denies the existence of psychiatric conditions, or any biological learning difficulties.

Harley and Kieffer (2009) stated that Study Tech materials claim that "absence of mass" is the idea that abstractions must be illustrated physically before they can be fully understood: learning about trains is accelerated if the student can see a train or a representation of one. Scientology classrooms are equipped with modeling clay and "demo kits", small collections of everyday objects, such as corks, caps, pen tops, and paper clips. Modeling clay or the contents of such a kit are used to create a physical model of what is being studied, thereby giving the student "mass". One of the course requirements for people learning to be Scientology trainers is to model in clay the premise of each paragraph of the chapter on communication in Hubbard's book, Dianetics 55!.

Scientology classrooms are supplied with different kinds of dictionaries, and students are directed to "find your misunderstood [word]." Yawning is taken as a physical sign that a student has misunderstood a word or concept.

Study Tech emphasizes the principle of "word clearing," an activity in which readers are asked to look up the meaning of words that they do not understand, and in turn look up unfamiliar words within the word's definition. The reader next is instructed to make up sentences of their own which use the word. This is their method of teaching vocabulary.

== Use in schools ==
According to Applied Scholastics in 1991, there were 150 schools using the Study Tech worldwide. However, a report by the St Petersburg Times said that response has been mixed. One school was forced closed in Germany and another one stopped from opening. Whereas in South Africa where the schools are backed by South African corporations, they reported success among poor black families. The Clearwater Florida schools were unaccredited, and some students reported learning more in the public schools.

In the United States, the method has been used in private Scientologist schools such as Delphi Schools, which runs a number of primary, middle, and secondary schools, and the former New Village Academy which was a private school in Calabasas, California.

In 1997, the California Department of Education reviewed the five Study Tech books as potential "supplementary texts" and found them to not be overtly religious. They were concerned, however, with the lack of social and gender diversity displayed in the books. The materials were criticized by a number of experts; for example, the practice of "word clearing" was criticized as a means for advancing the Scientologist use of clearing technology, and as inadequate for all levels of reading ability. Experts also criticized the inclusion of religiously-loaded terms such as "mass", "gradient" and "demo kit".

Study technology had been used extensively at the Mace-Kingsley Ranch School, a Church of Scientology-affiliated private ranch school for teenagers in a rural ranch environment. There have been several documented complaints of abuse and neglect, including students being lied to about the academic value of Study Tech.

The Literacy, Education and Ability Program (LEAP) of Memphis, Tennessee, an Applied Scholastics member organization, received a grant of $250,000 from the U.S. government's Fund for the Improvement of Education (FIE) in 2005.

In 2012, the Pinellas County School Board revoked the Life Force Arts and Technology Charter School's charter. Teachers blamed new school management's implementation of Study Tech curriculum for poor test results; the curriculum was not approved by the school board, which in part caused the charter to be revoked.

Study Tech was introduced in September 2008 at Bambolino Montessori Academy, a private school in Toronto, Ontario, Canada; the school's principal and dean said that the method is secular and that they do not teach Scientology. However, by 2012 Toronto, as well as Georgia, San Antonio, Texas, St. Louis, and Nevada had backed away from supporting Study Tech, after numerous complaints from educators and parents.

== See also ==
- Applied Scholastics
- Heron Books
