= Advertising management =

Part of the advertising industry

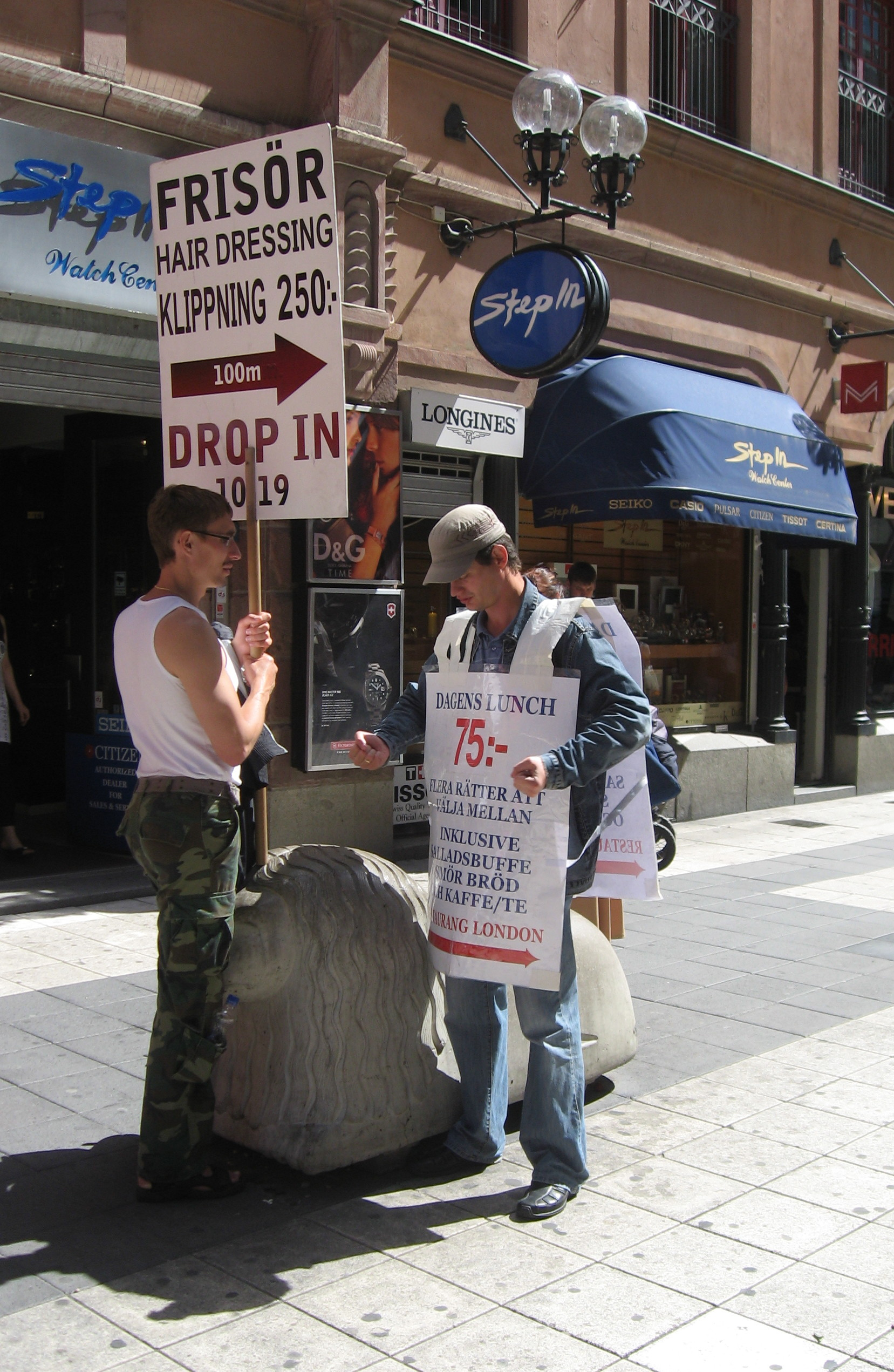
Advertising refers to any paid form of communication designed to create interest in or stimulate sales of products or services. Companies are constantly searching for novel media, such as these human billboards, to get their message out to potential consumers.

Advertising management is how a company carefully plans and controls its advertising to reach its ideal customers and convince them to buy.

Marketers use different types of advertising. Brand advertising is defined as a non-personal communication message placed in a paid, mass medium designed to persuade target consumers of a product or service benefits in an effort to induce them to make a purchase. Corporate advertising refers to paid messages designed to communicate the corporation's values to influence public opinion. Yet other types of advertising such as not-for-profit advertising and political advertising present special challenges that require different strategies and approaches.

Advertising management is a complex process that involves making many layered decisions including developing advertising strategies, setting an advertising budget, setting advertising objectives, determining the target market, media strategy (which involves media planning), developing the message strategy, and evaluating the overall effectiveness of the advertising effort.) Advertising management may also involve media buying.

Advertising management is a complex process. However, at its most basic level, it can be simplified into four key decision areas:

Target audience definition: Who do we want to talk to?
Message (or creative) strategy: What do we want to say to them?
Media strategy: How will we reach them?
Measuring advertising effectiveness: How do we know our messages were received in the form intended and with the desired outcomes?

== Advertising and advertising management: definitions ==
Consumers tend to think that all forms of commercial promotion constitute advertising. However, in marketing and advertising, the term "advertising" has a very special meaning that reflects its status as a distinct type of promotion.

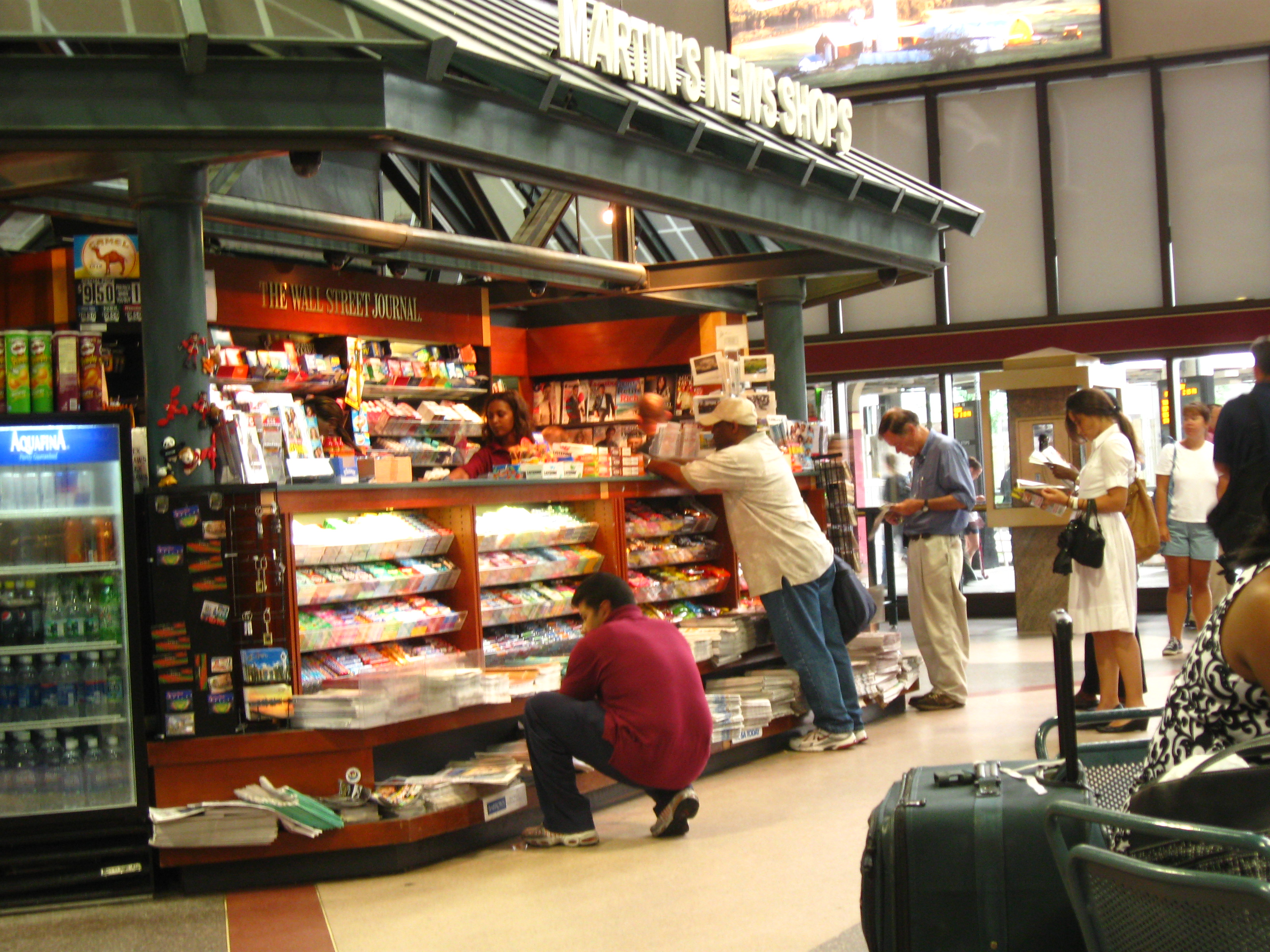
A key characteristic of advertising is that it utilises mass media channels such as newspapers, magazines, radio or TV to reach potential customers.

The marketing and advertising literature has many different definitions of advertising, but it is possible to identify common elements or themes within most of these definitions. The American Marketing Association (AMA) defines advertising as "the placement of announcements and persuasive messages in time or space purchased in any of the mass media by business firms, nonprofit organizations, government agencies, and individuals who seek to inform and/ or persuade members of a particular target market or audience about their products, services, organizations, or ideas". The American Heritage Dictionary defines advertising as "the activity of attracting public attention to a product or business, as by paid announcements in the print, broadcast, or electronic media". Selected marketing scholars have defined advertising in the following terms: "any non-personal communication that is paid for by an identified sponsor, and involves either mass communication viz newspapers, magazines, radio, television, and other media (e.g., billboards, bus stop signage) or direct to-consumer communication via direct mail". and "the element of the marketing communications mix that is non-personal, paid for by an identified sponsor, and disseminated through mass channels of communication to promote the adoption of goods, services, persons, or ideas." One of the shortest definitions is that advertising is "a paid, mass-mediated attempt to persuade".

Several common themes emerge in the various definitions of advertising:

- Advertising is a paid form of communication and is therefore commercial.
- Advertising employs non-personal channels (i.e. commercial mass media) which implies that it is directed at a mass audience rather than at an individual consumer and is a one-way communication mode where the sponsor sends messages, but recipients cannot respond or ask questions about the message content.
- Advertising has an identified sponsor.

In summary, because advertising is paid for, it is one of the many controllable elements of the marketing programme. Advertising is qualitatively different from publicity, in which the message sponsor is either not identified or ambiguously defined. It also differs from personal selling, which occurs in real time and typically involves some form of face-to-face interaction between the message sponsor and the recipient, allowing for two-way communication.

While advertising refers to the advertising message, per se, advertising management refers to the process of planning and executing an advertising campaign or campaigns; that is, it is a series of planned decisions that begins with market research continues through to setting advertising budgets, developing advertising objectives, executing the creative messages and follows up with efforts to measure the extent to which objectives were achieved and evaluate the cost-benefit of the overall advertising effort.

== Advertising and organisational responsibilities ==
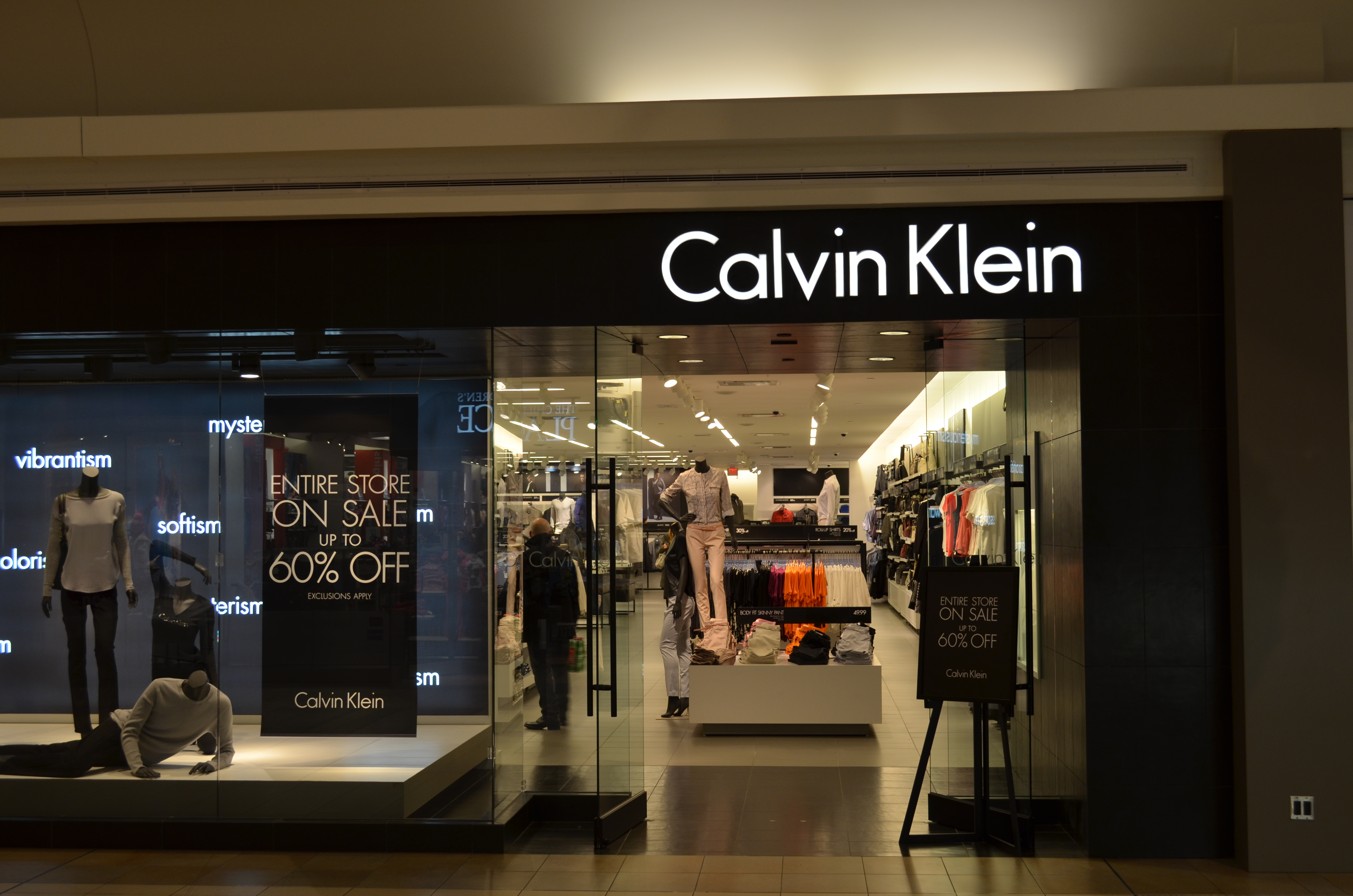
Calvin Klein is one of a growing number of companies that uses an in-house agency for its advertising and promotion.

In commercial organisations, advertising, along with other marketing communications activities, is the ultimate responsibility of the marketing department. Some companies outsource part or all of the work to specialists such as advertising agencies, creative design teams, web designers, media buyers, events management specialists or other relevant service providers. Another option is for a company to carry out most or all of the advertising functions within the marketing department in what is known as an in-house agency. By definition, an in-house agency is "an advertising organization that is owned and operated by the corporation it serves". Its mission is to provide advertising services in support of its parent company's business and marketing objectives. Well-known brands that currently use in-house agencies include Google, Calvin Klein, Adobe, Dell, IBM, Kraft, Marriott and Wendy's.

Both in-house agencies and outsourcing models have their own advantages and disadvantages. Outsourcing to an external agency allows marketers to obtain specialised strategic, research and planning skills, access to devoted creative talent and provides an independent perspective on marketing or advertising problems. In-house agencies deliver cost advantages, time efficiencies and afford marketers greater control over the advertising effort. In addition, personnel who work within an in-house agency gain considerable creative experience which stays within the company. Recent trends suggest that the number of in-house agencies is rising.

Whether a company chooses to outsource advertising functions to an external agency or carry them out within the marketing department, marketers need an understanding of advertising principles in order to prepare advertising plans, brief agencies about their needs and expectations, or develop their own solutions to marketing problems.

== Advertising's role in the promotional mix ==
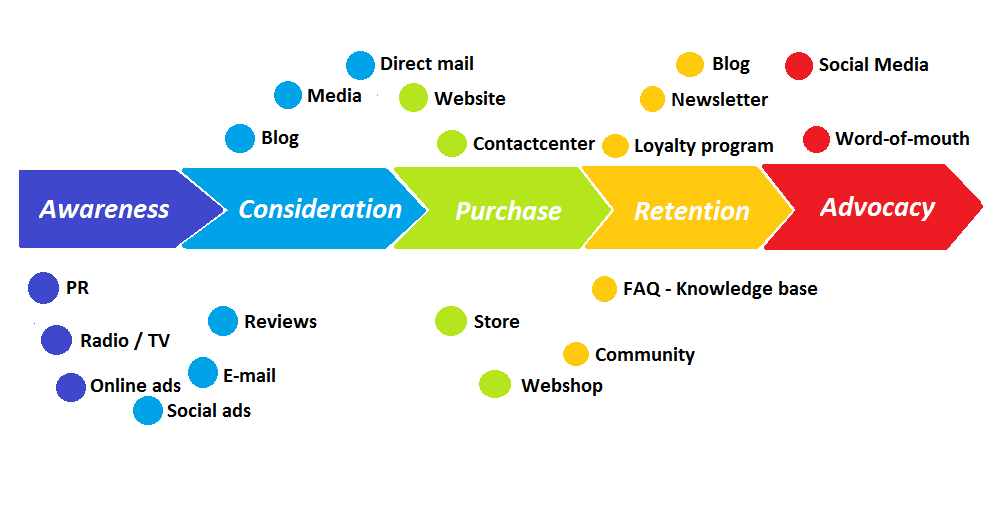
Customers rely on different types of marketing communications at different stages of their purchase decision.

The promotional mix is the specific combination of promotional methods used for a brand, product or family of products. Advertising is best treated as a multiplier that can leverage other elements of the promotional mix and marketing program. Therefore, advertising must be considered as part of a broader marketing and promotional program.

The promotional mix includes a variety of tools such as:

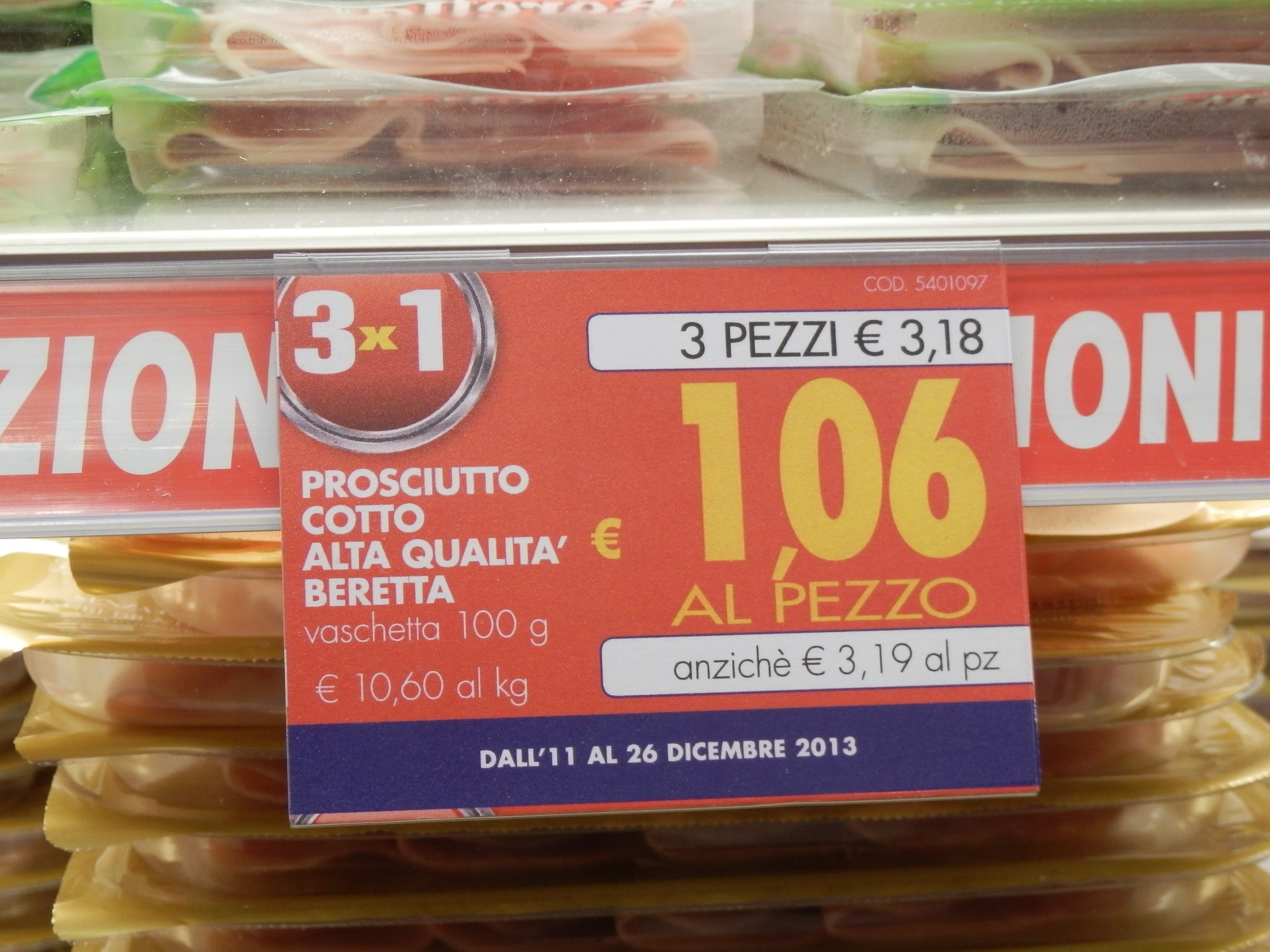
Sales promotion includes a variety of activities such as special price offers designed to stimulate sales.

Advertising: messages paid for by those who send them and intended to inform or influence people who receive them
Branded entertainment: the dedicated production of content designed to display corporate or branded messages in an entertaining format
Public relations (PR): the practice of maintaining goodwill between an organisation and its publics
Personal selling: face-to-face selling in which a seller attempts to persuade a buyer to make a purchase.
Direct marketing: contacting and influencing carefully chosen prospects with means such as telemarketing and direct mail
Sponsorship: the act of providing money for a television or radio program, website, sports event, or other activity usually in exchange for advertising or other form of promotion
Product placement: the practice of supplying a product or service for display in feature films or television programs
Sales promotion / merchandising: activities designed to stimulate sales normally at the point-of-sale; includes retail displays, product sampling, special price offers, shelf talkers, contests, giveaways, promotional items, competitions and other methods
Event marketing: a planned activity of designing or developing a themed activity, occasion, display, or exhibit (such as a sporting event, music festival, fair, or concert) to promote a product, cause, or organization.
Exhibitions/trade shows: events or shows (e.g. fashion shows, agricultural shows) where companies can display their wares or services

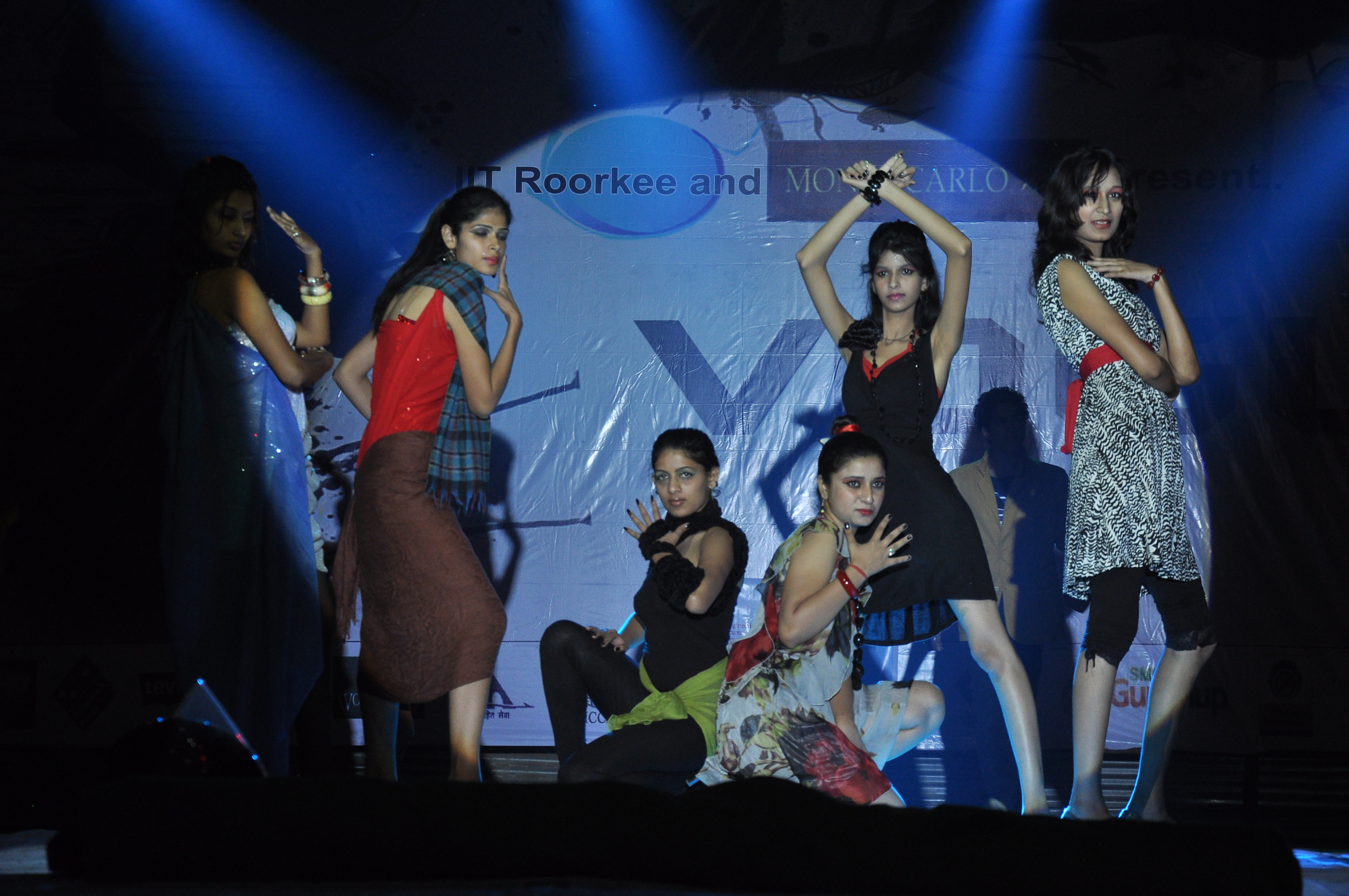
The Vogue Fashion Show is a special event designed to promote top designers' seasonal collections.

Advertising is just one of many elements that comprise the promotional mix. When marketers communicate with target markets across a broad range of different promotional types and media, the potential for contradictory or mixed messages is very real. Accordingly, it is important that advertising is treated as part of a total marketing communications program and that steps are taken to ensure that it is integrated with all other marketing communications, so that all communications messages speak with a 'single voice'. The process of ensuring message consistency across the entire marketing communications program is known as integrated marketing communications.

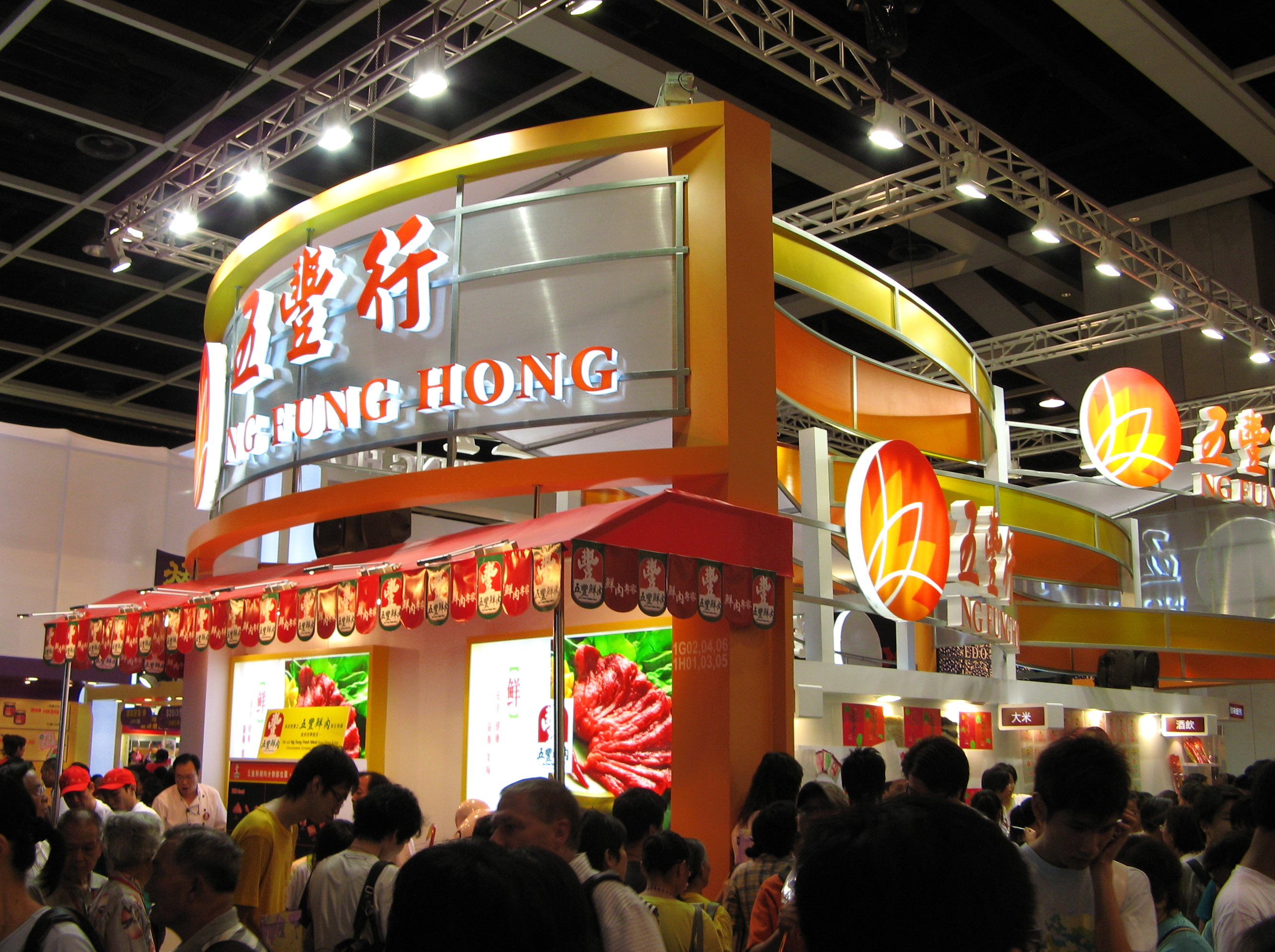
Mounting a display at a trade-fair or exhibition, such as the Hong Kong Food Show, is part of a company's total promotional mix.

Marketers need to be aware of the strengths and weaknesses of each of the elements in the promotional mix in order to select the right blend for a given situation. For instance, public relations allows for high credibility message delivery with relatively low costs, while advertising permits message repetition. Advertising is especially useful for creating awareness, but personal channels come into play for the actual purchase. The "right" promotional mix should consider both message impact and message consistency. In addition, decision-makers need to recognise that consumers rely on different information sources at different stages of the purchase decision process. Therefore, advertising and other elements of the promotional campaign must be integrated to ensure that consumers receive the right messages via the right channels at the right time, depending on the consumer's readiness to buy.

In terms of integrated communications, the literature identifies different types of integration: (1) Image integration refers to messages that have a consistent look and feel, regardless of the medium; (2) Functional integration refers to capacity of different promotional tools to complement each other and deliver a unified, coherent message; (3) Coordinated integration refers to the ways that different internal and external agencies (e.g. web designers, advertising agencies, PR consultants) coordinate to provide a consistent message; (4) Stakeholder integration refers to the way that all stakeholders such as employees, suppliers, customers and others cooperate to communicate a shared understanding of the company's key messages and values and (5) Relationship integration refers to the way that communications professionals contribute to the company's overall corporate goals and quality management.

On the surface, integrated marketing communications appear to be simple common sense. Yet, a survey of brand advertisers carried out by the Association of National Advertisers (ANA) revealed that while 67 per cent of marketers engage in integrated marketing communications, just one third are satisfied with their efforts. In practice, integrating communications messages across a broad range of promotional formats and media channels is very difficult to achieve.

== Theories of advertising effects ==
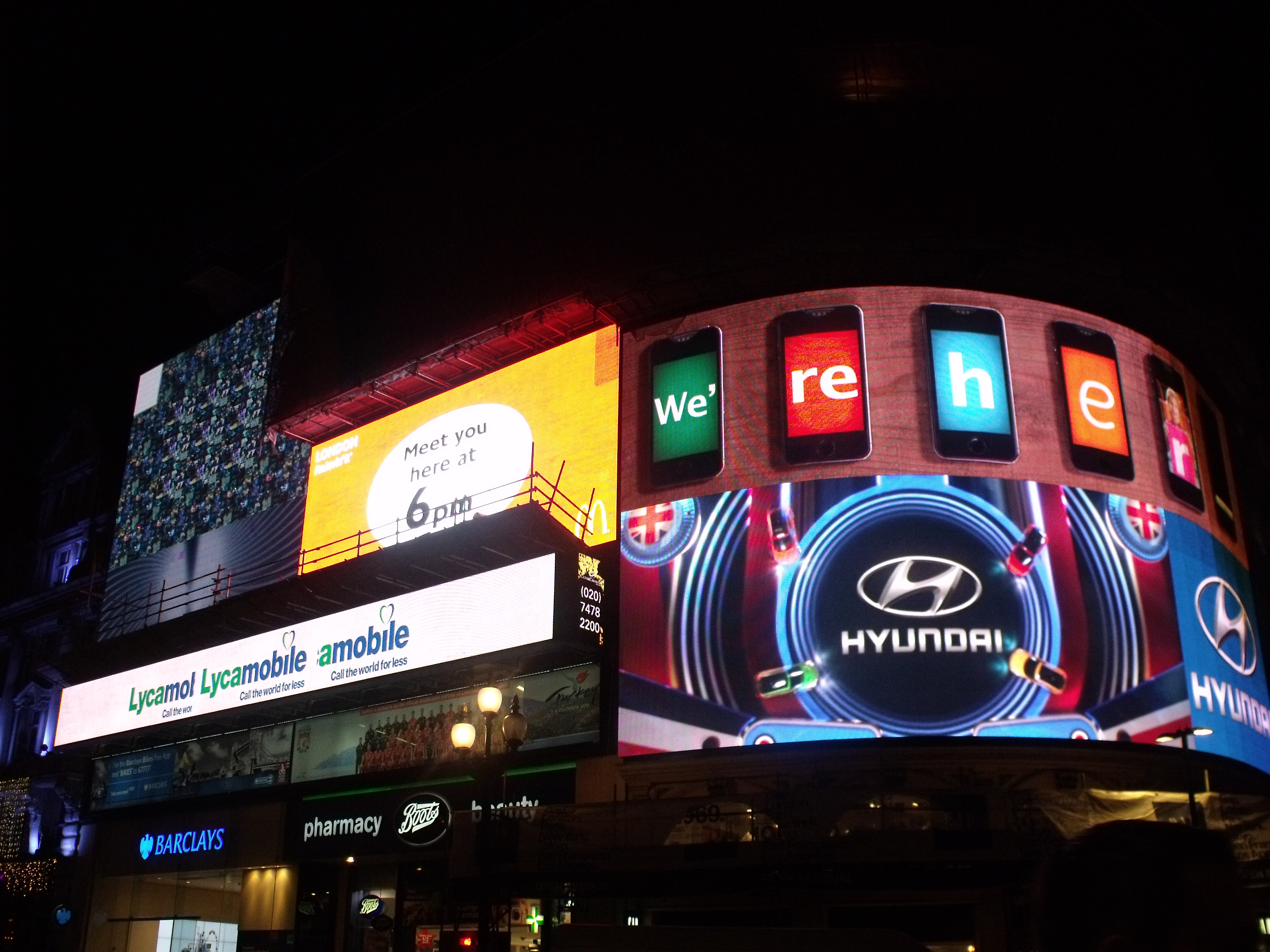
Advertising messages are all around us, yet the mechanism which leads from exposure to brand advertising through to sales is not entirely clear.

Studies have repeatedly demonstrated a clear association between advertising and sales response. Yet the exact process that leads from the consumer of being exposed to an advertising message through to a purchase or behavioral response is not entirely clear. Noting the difficulties in explaining how advertising works, one theorist wrote, "Only the brave or ignorant...can say exactly what advertising does in the marketplace."

The advertising and marketing literature suggests a variety of different models to explain how advertising works. These models are not competing theories, but rather explanations of how advertising persuades or influences different types of consumers in different purchase contexts. In a seminal paper, Vankratsas and Ambler surveyed more than 250 papers to develop a typology of advertising models. They identified four broad classes of model: cognitive information models, pure affect models, hierarchy of effect models, integrative models and hierarchy-free models.

=== Cognitive information models ===
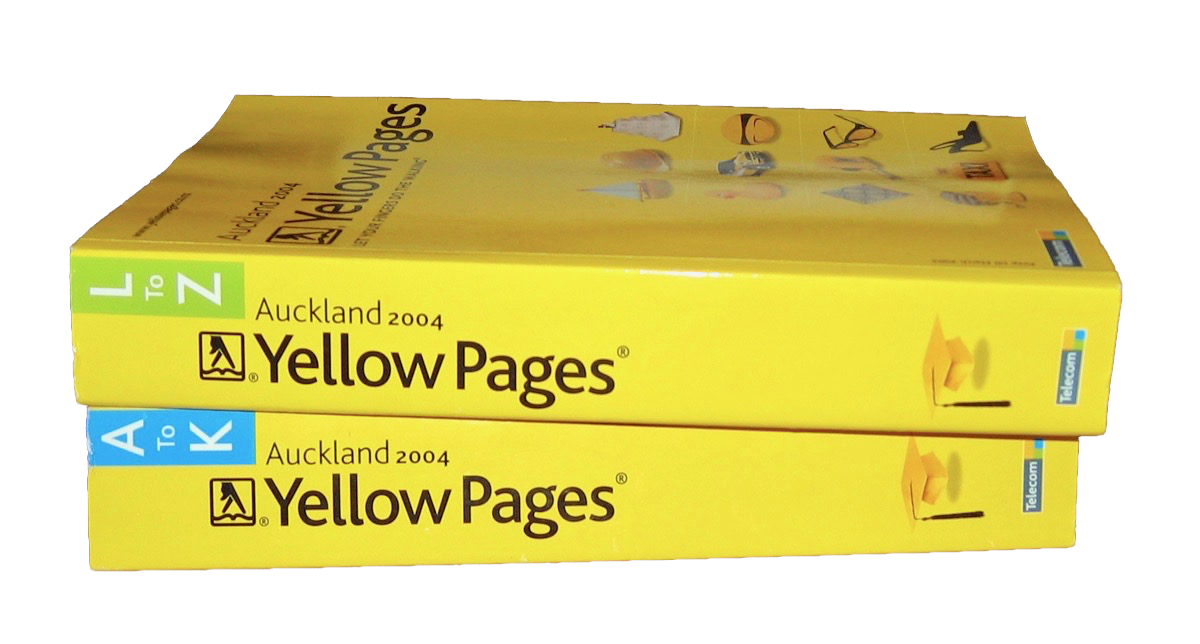
A directory such as Yellow Pages can eliminate the need for extensive store visits and the need to recall brand names.

Advertising researchers have a long-standing interest in understanding both the degree and type of cognitive elaboration that occurs when consumers are exposed to persuasive messages. Cognitive information models assume that consumers are rational decision-makers, and that advertising provides consumers with information utility by reducing the need to search for other information about a brand. For example, an advertisement in the Yellow Pages or an online directory means that the consumer does not have to travel from store to store in search of a product or service. Consumers process this information at a cognitive level before forming an attitude to the brand and purchase intent. A cognition is any thought that surfaces during the elaboration of the information. Cognitive information models are also known as the central route to persuasion.

A common theme in cognitive information models is that the net favourability of cognitive responses has a direct influence on attitude strength. In the cognitive information models, the general path to persuasion is as follows:

Ad cognition→ Attitude to ad (A_{ad}) → Brand cognition → Attitude to brand(A_{b}) →Purchase Intention (PI)

Theoretical works, combined with empirical studies, suggest that advertising information is more useful for experience goods (experiential services) than for search goods (tangible products). Research studies also suggest that consumers who are involved in the purchase decision are more likely to actively seek out product information and actively process advertising messages while low-involvement consumers are more likely to respond at an emotional level.

=== Pure affect models ===
Pure affect models suggest that consumers shape their preferences to a brand based on the feelings and attitudes elicited by exposure to an advertising message. When consumers view an advertisement, they not only develop attitudes towards the advertisement and the advertiser, but also develop feelings and beliefs about the brand being advertised.

Pure affect models help to explain the consumer's emotional responses to advertising and brands. These models suggest that simple exposure to a brand is sufficient to generate purchase intention. Exposure in the form of advertising messages leads to an attitude to the advertisement (A_{ad}) which transfers to the attitude to the brand (A_{b}) without any further cognitive processing. Exposure it not restricted to physical contact; rather it can refer to any brand-related contact such as advertising, promotion or virtual brands on websites.

In pure affect models, the path to communication effectiveness is represented by the following:

Attitude to Ad (A_{ad}) → Attitude to Brand (A_{b}) → Purchase Intention (PI).

This path is also known as the peripheral route to persuasion. Empirical research in the pure affect sphere suggests that advertising messages do not need to be informative to be effective, however consumers must like the advertising execution for the message to be effective. In addition, ad liking and advertiser credibility, may be especially important for corporate image advertising (compared to product-related advertising).

=== Hierarchy of effects models ===
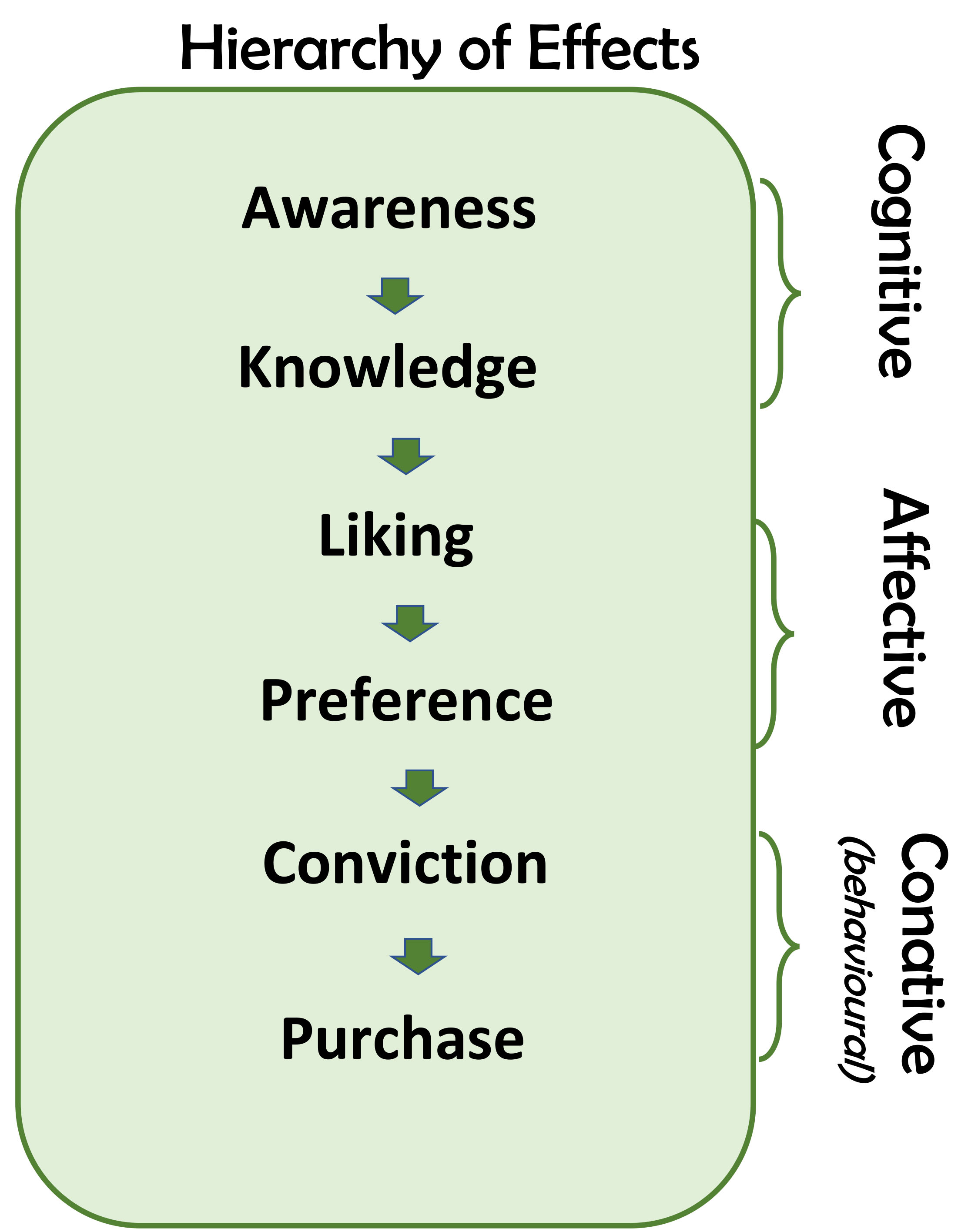
Generalised hierarchy of effects sequence (after Lavidge)

Hierarchical models are linear sequential models built on an assumption that consumers move through a series of cognitive and affective stages culminating in the purchase decision. The common theme among these models is that advertising operates as a stimulus and the purchase decision is a response. A number of hierarchical models can be found in the literature including Lavidge's hierarchy of effects, DAGMAR and AIDA and other variants. Some authors have argued that, for advertising purposes, the hierarchical models have dominated advertising theory, and that, of these models, the AIDA model is one of the most widely applied.

The AIDA model proposes that advertising messages need to accomplish a number of tasks designed to move the consumer through a series of sequential steps from brand awareness through to action (purchase and consumption).

Awareness – The consumer becomes aware of a category, product or brand (usually through advertising)

↓

Interest – The consumer becomes interested by considering the brand's fit with the consumer's lifestyle

↓

Desire – The consumer develops a favorable (or unfavorable) disposition towards the brand

↓

Action – The consumer forms a purchase intention or actually makes a purchase

As consumers move through the hierarchy of effects, they pass through both a cognitive processing stage and an affective processing stage before any action occurs. Thus, the hierarchy of effects models all include Cognition (C)- Affect (A)- Behaviour (B) as the core steps in the underlying behavioral sequence. The underlying behavioral sequence for all hierarchy models is as follows:

Cognition (Awareness/learning) → Affect (Feeling/ interest/ desire)→ Behavior (Action e.g. purchase/ consumption/ usage/ sharing information)

The literature offers numerous variations on the basic path to persuasion. The basic AIDA model is one of the longest serving models. Contemporary hierarchical models often modify or expand the basic AIDA model, resulting in additional steps, however, all follow the basic sequence which includes Cognition- Affect- Behaviour. Some of these newer models have been adapted to accommodate consumer's digital media habits. Selected hierarchical models follow:

Basic AIDA model: Awareness→ Interest→ Desire→ Action
Modified AIDA model: Awareness→ Interest→ Conviction →Desire→ Action
AIDAS Model: Attention → Interest → Desire → Action → Satisfaction
AISDALSLove model: Awareness→ Interest→ Search →Desire→ Action → Like/dislike→ Share → Love/ Hate
Lavidge et al.'s Hierarchy of Effects: Awareness→ Knowledge→ Liking→ Preference→ Conviction→ Purchase
DAGMAR Model: Awareness → Comprehension → Attitude/ Conviction → Action
Rossiter and Percy's Communications Effects: Category Need → Brand Awareness → Brand Preference (A_{b}) → Purchase Intent→ Purchase Facilitation

The Purchase Funnel indicates that awareness is a necessary precondition for purchase.

All hierarchical models indicate that brand awareness is a necessary precondition to brand attitude, brand preference or brand purchase intention. The process of moving consumers from purchase intention to actual sales is known as conversion. While advertising is an excellent tool for creating awareness, brand attitude and purchase intent, it usually requires support from other elements in the promotion mix and the marketing program to convert purchase intent into an actual sale. Many different techniques can be used to convert interest into sales including special price offers, special promotional offers, attractive trade-in terms, guarantees or a strong call-to-action as part of the advertising message.

In order to penetrate markets, it is essential that high levels of awareness are created as early as possible in a product or brand life-cycle. Hierarchical models provide marketers and advertisers with basic insights about the nature of the target audience, the optimal message and media strategy indicated at different junctures throughout a product's life cycle. For new products, the main advertising objective should be to create awareness with a broad cross-section of the potential market as quickly as practical. When the desired levels of awareness have been attained, the promotional effort should shift to stimulating interest, desire or conviction. The number of potential purchasers decreases as the product moves through the natural sales cycle in an effect likened to a funnel. Early in the campaign, the marketers should attempt to reach as many potential buyers as possible with high impact messages. Later in the cycle, and as the number of prospects becomes smaller, the marketer can employ more tightly targeted promotional activities such as personal selling, direct mail and email directed at those individuals or sub-segments more likely to exhibit a genuine interest in the product or brand.

=== Integrative models ===
Integrative models assume that consumers process advertising information via two paths – both cognitive (thinking) and affective (feeling) simultaneously. These models seek to combine the type of purchase with the consumer's dominant mode of processing. Integrative models are based on research findings indicating that congruence between personality and the way a persuasive message is framed. That is, aligning the message framing with the recipient's personality profile may play an important role in ensuring the success of that message. In a recent experiment, five advertisements (each designed to target one of the five personality traits) were constructed for a single product. Findings suggest that advertisements were evaluated more positively when they aligned with participants' motives. Tailoring persuasive messages to the personality traits of the targeted audience can be an effective way of enhancing the message's impact.

There are many integrative frameworks. Two of the more widely used models are the grids developed by Foote, Cone, Belding (FCB) (see below) and another devised by Rossiter and Percy, and which is an extension of the FCB approach. These planning grids are very popular with advertising practitioners because of their ease of application.

==== Foote, Cone, Belding (FCB) planning grid ====
The FCB planning grid was developed by Richard Vaughan, who was the senior vice president at advertising agency, Foote, Cone and Belding, in the 1980s. The planning grid has two dimensions, involvement and information processing. Each dimension has two values, representing extremes of a continuum, specifically involvement (high/low) and information processing (thinking/feeling). These form a 2 × 2 matrix with four cells representing the different types of advertising effects.

The FCB Planning Grid
Info processing Type of Decision	Thinking	Feeling
High-involvement	1. Learn→Feel→Do	2. Feel→Learn→Do
Low-involvement	3. Do→Learn→Feel	4. Do→Feel→ Learn

The FCB planning grid gives rise to a number of implications for advertising and media strategy:

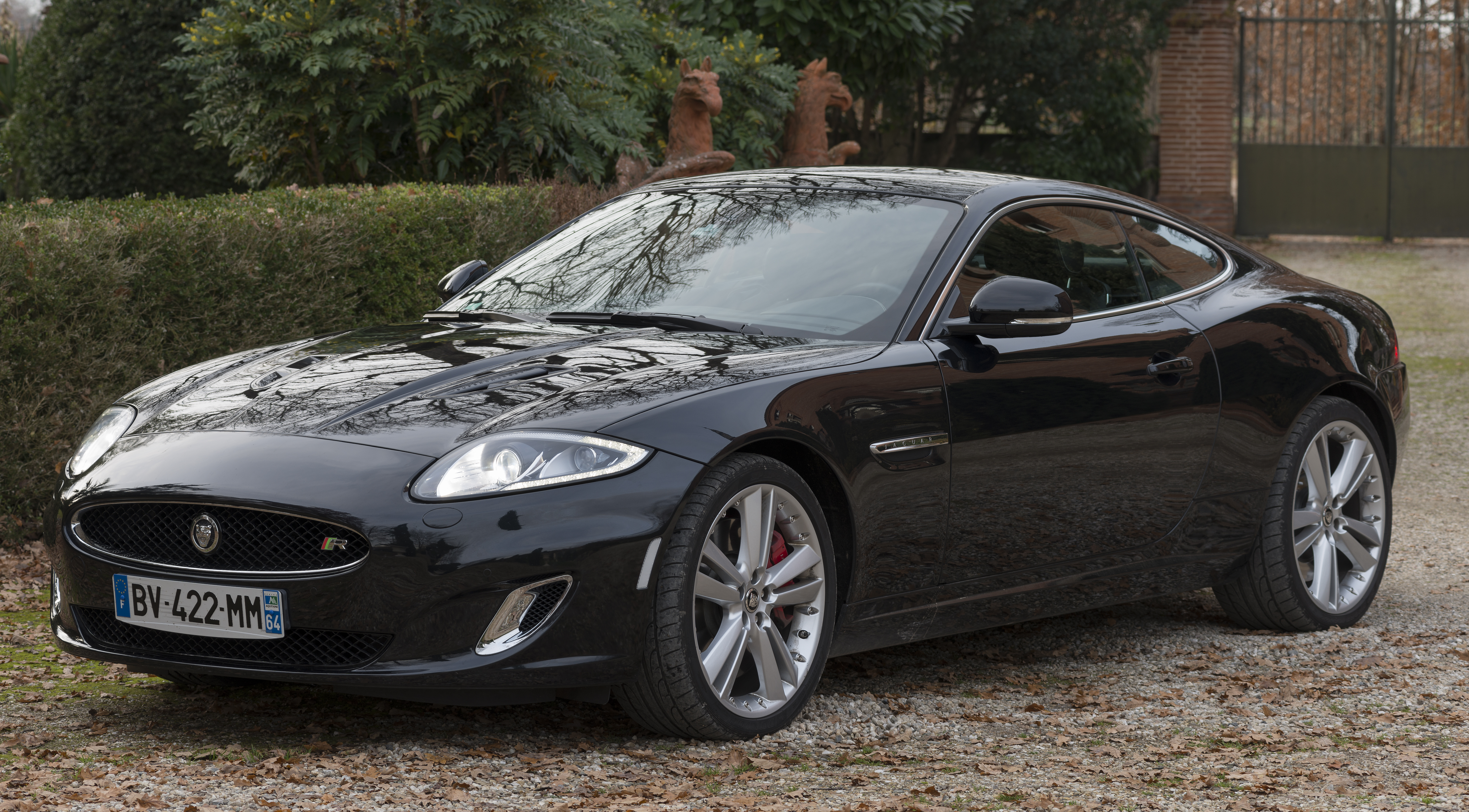
An expensive car is a high-involvement/rational purchase (i.e., FCB Quadarant 1).

Quadrant 1: High-involvement/ rational purchases: In the first quadrant consumers learn about a product through advertising after which they develop a favourable (or unfavourable) disposition to the product which may or may not culminate in a purchase. This approach is considered optimal for advertising high ticket items such as cars and household furniture. When this is the dominant approach to purchasing, advertising messages should be information-rich and media strategy should be weighted towards media such as magazines and newspapers capable of delivering long-copy advertising.

Quadrant 2: High-involvement/ emotional purchases: In the second quadrant, audiences exhibit an emotional response to advertisements which transfers to products. This approach is used for products such as jewellery, expensive perfumes and designer fashion where consumers are emotionally involved in the purchase. When this mode of purchasing is evident, advertising should be designed to create a strong brand image and media should be selected to support the relevant image. For example, magazines such as Vogue can help to create an up-market image.

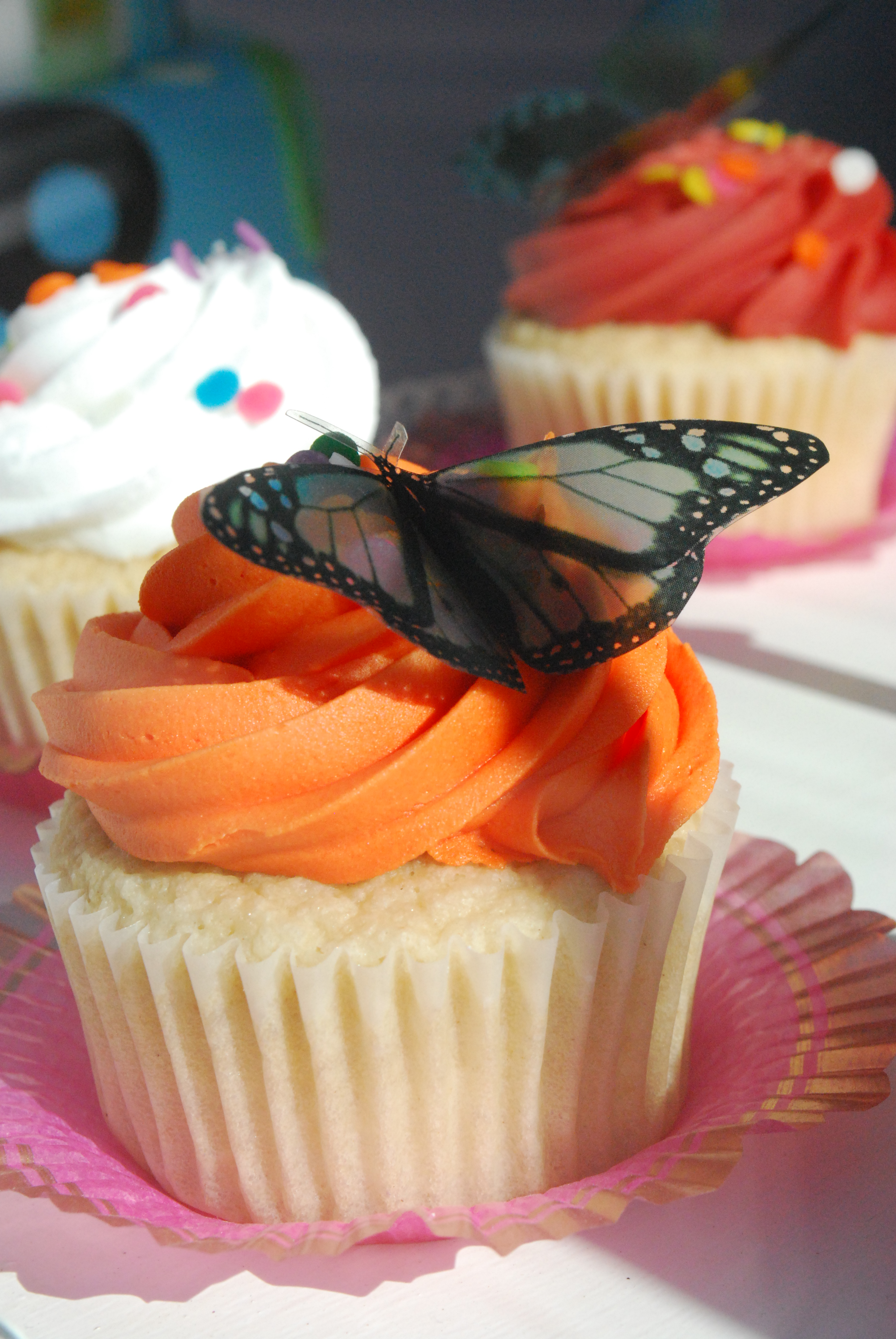
Impulse purchases are low-involvement/ emotional purchase items that make consumers feel good (i.e., FCB Quadrant 4).

Quadrant 3: Low-involvement/ rational purchases: The third quadrant represents routine low-involvement purchases evident for many packaged goods such as detergents, tissues and other consumable household items. Consumers make habitual purchases, and after consumption the benefit of using the brand is reinforced which ideally results in long-term brand loyalty (re-purchase). Given that this is a rational purchase, consumers need to be informed or reminded of the product's benefits. Advertising messages should encourage repeat purchasing and brand loyalty while media strategy should be weighted towards media that can deliver high frequency required for reminder campaigns such as TV, radio and sales promotion.

Quadrant 4: Low-involvement/ emotional purchases: In the final quadrant, consumers make low-involvement, relatively inexpensive purchases that make them feel good. Impulse purchases and convenience goods fall into this category. The purchase leads to feelings of satisfaction which, in turn, reinforces the purchase behavior. When this approach is the dominant purchase mode, advertising messages should "congratulate" customers on their purchase choice and the media strategy should be weighted towards options that reach customers when they are close to the point-of-purchase such as billboards, sales promotion and point-of-sale displays. Examples of this approach include "McDonald's – You Deserve a Break Today" and "L'Oreal- Because You're Worth It".

=== Hierarchy-free models ===
Many authors have treated reason (rational processes) and emotion (affective processes) as entirely independent. Yet, other researchers have argued that both reason and emotion can be employed simultaneously, to process advertising information. Hierarchy-free models draw on evidence from psychology and consumer neuroscience which suggest that consumers process information via different pathways rather than in any linear/ sequential manner. Thus, hierarchy-free models do not employ any fixed processing sequence. These models treat advertising as part of the brand totality. Some hierarchy-free models treat brands as 'myth' and advertising as 'myth-making' while other models seek to tap into the consumer's memories of pleasant consumption experiences (e.g. the MAC- Memory-Affect-Cognition model). Hierarchy-free models are of increasing interest to academics and practitioners because they are more customer-centric and allow for the possibility of consumer co-creation of value.

== Advertising planning ==
Advertising planning does not occur in a vacuum. Advertising objectives are derived from marketing objectives. Therefore, the first step in any advertising planning is to review to the objectives as set out in the marketing plan. This is designed to ensure that all promotional efforts, including advertising, are working towards achieving both short-term and long-term corporate and marketing goals and align with the company's values and vision.

=== Review the marketing plan ===
A review of the marketing plan can be a relatively simple process, or it can involve a formal review, known as an audit. The review or audit might consider such issues as prior marketing communications activity, an evaluation of what has been effective in the past, whether new market research studies are warranted, an outline of competitive advertising activity and a review of budgetary considerations.

The marketing plan can be expected to provide information about the company's long and short-term goals, competitive rivalry, a description of the target market, products offered, positioning strategy, pricing strategy, distribution strategy and other promotional programs. All of this information has potential implications for developing the advertising program. The advertiser must study the marketing plan carefully and determine how to translate the marketing objectives into an advertising program. Each advertising campaign is unique, so that the review requires a great deal of analysis as well as judgement.

==== Overall communications objectives ====
Communications objectives are derived from marketing objectives. However, communications objectives must be framed in terms of communications effects. For example, a company's short-term marketing objective might be to increase sales response for a given brand. However, this objective would require that a large number of consumers are aware of the brand and are favourably disposed towards it. Furthermore, consumers' purchase intentions may be dependent on other marketing activities such as access, price, the ability to trial the brand prior to final purchase and other marketing activities. It is unfair to hold marketing communications accountable for all sales when it is only one element in the total marketing effort.

While advertising is an excellent tool for creating awareness and interest in a brand, it is less effective at turning that awareness and interest into actual sales. To convert interest into sales, different promotional tools such as personal selling or sales promotion may be more useful. Many authors caution against using sales or market share objectives for marketing communications or advertising purposes.

Communications objectives might include such things as to:

- increase purchase
- encourage trial
- encourage loyalty
- position or re-position a brand
- educate customers

These will need to be translated into advertising objectives.

==== Target market and target audience ====
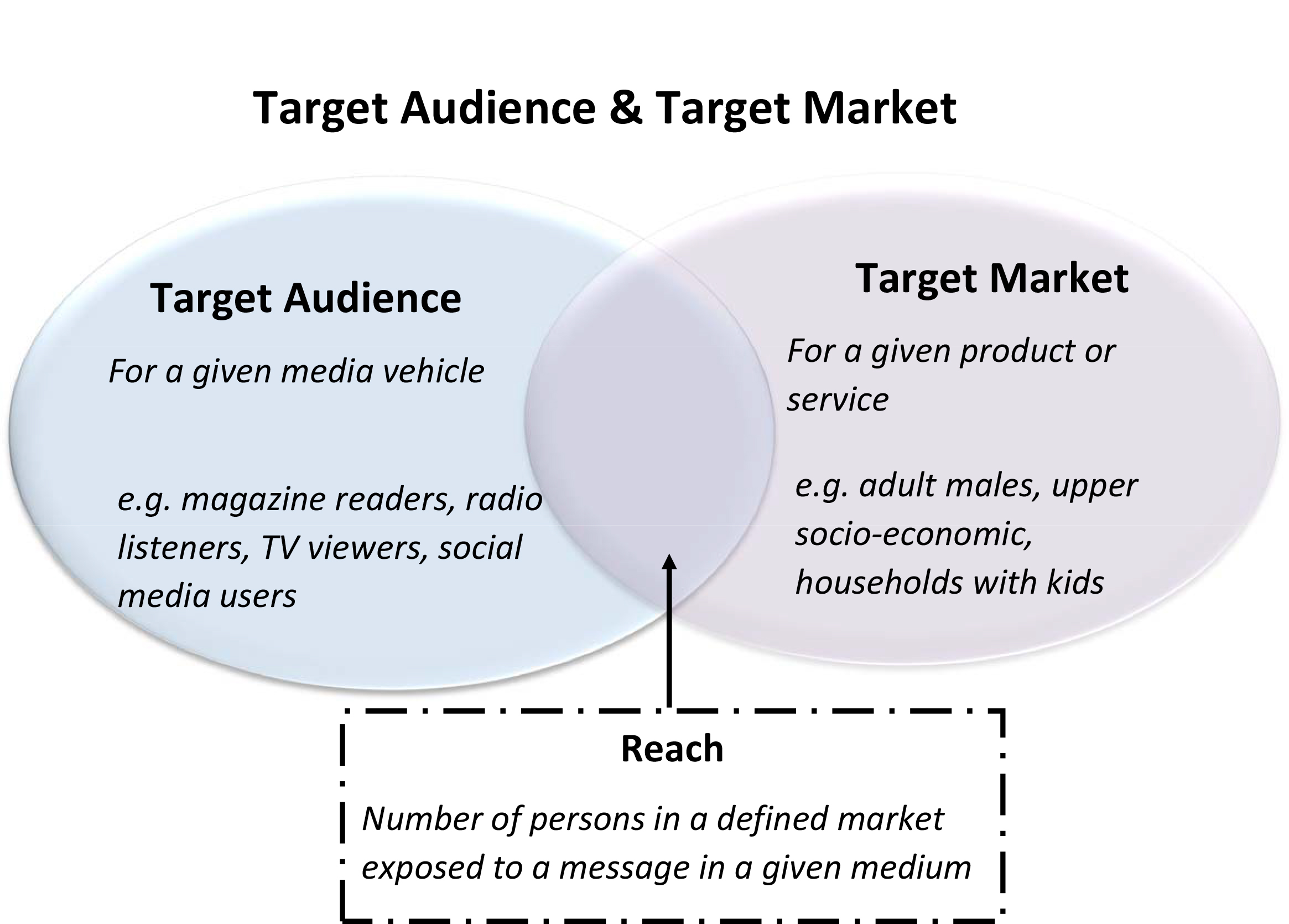
Relationship between target market and target audience

The review should take note of the overall target market. However, this does not necessarily mean that the advertising campaign will be directed at the total target market. Marketers and advertisers make a distinction between the target audience for an advertising message and the target market for a product or brand. By definition, the target audience is the intended audience for a given advertisement or message in a publication or broadcast medium, while the target market consists of all existing and potential consumers of a product, service or brand. Companies often develop different advertising messages and media strategies to reach different target audiences. For example, McDonald's Restaurants uses the anthropomorphic brand characters, Ronald McDonald and Hamburgler, in its advertising directed at children who are important brand-choice influencers. However, for adult target audience members, McDonald's uses messages that emphasise convenience and quality. Thus, the target audience for a given advertising message may comprise only a subset of the total market as defined in the marketing plan. Careful perusal of the marketing plan will assist marketers in the process of defining the optimal target audiences for specific advertising objectives.

==== Push vs pull strategy ====
The communications objectives will, at least in part, depend on whether the marketer is using a push or pull strategy. In a push strategy, the marketer advertises intensively with retailers and wholesalers, with the expectation that they will stock the product or brand, and that consumers will purchase it when they see it in stores. In contrast, in a pull strategy, the marketer advertises directly to consumers hoping that they will put pressure on retailers to stock the product or brand, thereby pulling it through the distribution channel. In a push strategy the promotional mix would consist of trade advertising and sales calls while the advertising media would normally be weighted towards trade magazines, exhibitions and trade shows while a pull strategy would make more extensive use consumer-oriented advertising and sales promotions while the media mix would be weighted towards mass-market media such as newspapers, magazines, television and radio.

=== Devising advertising objectives ===
Setting advertising objectives provides the framework for the entire advertising plan. Therefore, it is important to specify precisely what is to be achieved and outline how advertising will be evaluated. Advertising objectives should be Specific, Measurable, Achievable, Relevant, and Time-dependent (SMART). Any statement of advertising objectives must include measurement benchmarks – that is the norms against which advertising effectiveness will be evaluated. One of the first approaches to setting communications-oriented objectives was the DAGMAR approach (Defining Advertising Goals for Measured Advertising Results) developed in the 1960s. While memorable, the DAGMAR approach fails to provide concrete guidance on how to link advertising objectives with communications effects.

In order to set realistic and achievable advertising objectives, most advertisers try to link advertising or communications objectives with the communications effects. Rossiter and Bellman have argued that, for advertising purposes, five communications effects should be considered, namely:

1. Category Need: The consumer's acceptance that the category (the product or service) is necessary to satisfy some need
2. Brand awareness (brand recognition and brand recall): The consumer's ability to recognise a brand or to recall a brand name from memory
3. Brand preference (or brand attitude): The extent to which a consumer will choose one brand over other competing brands in the category
4. Brand action intention (purchase intent): The consumer's self-instruction to purchase a given brand
5. Purchase facilitation: The extent to which the consumer knows how and where to purchase the brand

Managerial Options for Communications Objectives
Target Consumer's State of Mind	Communication/ Advertising Objective	Advertising Message Example
Category Need: Category need already present; Latent category need; No or weak category need	Omit category need as an objective of advertising or promotion; Mention category need to remind customer of previously established need; "Sell" category need using positive or negative motivations; (e.g. pain removal, pain avoidance, dissatisfaction, sensory gratification, social approval)	Pain avoidance: "For fast, sure pain relief, Anacin"
Brand Awareness: Brand recall; Brand recognition	Use taglines, slogans, jingles to teach brand recall and strengthen learning; Associate brand name with category; Show product packaging or label in all advertising	Paired category-brand association: "When you think of chocolate, think of Cadbury"
Brand Preference: Negative preference; Unaware; Moderate preference; Strong preference	Change to moderate preference; Create strong preference; Increase preference; Reinforce strong preference	Brand Preference: "The burgers are better at Burger King (or Hungry Jack's)"
Purchase Intention: Low-involvement decision; High-involvement decision	Omit purchase-intention; Generate purchase-intention	Purchase-intention: "Hurry, hurry last days, offer must expire soon"; "Don't wait- limited stocks available"
Purchase Facilitation: Customer knows where to purchase product or service and how much to pay for it; Not obvious where to purchase or how to find retailer	Omit purchase-facilitation; Incorporate purchase-facilitation in all marketing communications	Purchase-facilitation: "Refer to website for nearest stockist"

For many purchases, category need and purchase facilitation will be present in the customer's mind and can be omitted from the advertising objectives. However, for some purchases, the customer may not be aware of the product category or may not know how to access it, in which case these objectives will need to be addressed in the communications objectives. Brand awareness, brand preference and purchase intention are almost always included as advertising objectives.

=== Setting advertising budgets ===
A firm's advertising budget is a sub-set of its overall budget. For many firms, the cost of advertising is one of the largest expenses, second only to wages and salaries. Advertising expenditure varies enormously according to firm size, market coverage, managerial expectations and even managerial style. Procter and Gamble, the top US advertiser, spent US$4.3 billion in 2015 on national media (exclusive of agency fees and production costs) while a small local advertiser might spend just a few thousand dollars in the same period.

The size of the budget has implications for the promotional mix, the media mix and market coverage. As a generalisation, very large budgets are required to sustain national television campaigns. Advertisers with tight budgets may forced to use less effective media alternatives. However, even advertisers with small budgets may be able to incorporate expensive main media, by focusing on narrow geographic markets, buying spots in non-peak time periods and carefully managing advertising schedules.

A number of different methods are used to develop the advertising (and/or marketing communications) budget. The most commonly used methods are: percentage-of-sales, objective and task, competitive parity method, market share method, unit sales method, all available funds method and the affordable method.

==== Percentage-of-sales method ====
Using the percentage-of-sales method, the advertiser allocates a fixed percentage (say 5% or 10%) of forecast sales value to the advertising budget. This method is predicated on the assumption that advertising causes future sales volume. The percentage of sales method is the easiest method to use and for this reason remains one of the most widely used methods for setting budgets.

A major problem with the %-of-sales method is that there is no consensus about the percentage value to apply. Some companies use industry averages as a guide to set their marcomms budget. The following table, based on industry averages, shows that the % value can vary from around 20% of sales to less than 1 percent.

Ad-to-sales ratios for selected industries, 2004
Industry	Ad-to-sales ratio
Health services	18.7
Transportation services	14.2
Motion pictures and videotape production	13.7
Food	11.9
Computer & office equipment	11.9
Computer & software wholesale	0.2

==== Objective and task method ====
The objective and task method is the most rational and defensible of all budgeting methods. In this method, the advertiser determines the advertising objectives and then defines specific, measurable communication tasks that will need to be undertaken to achieve the desired objectives. Cost estimates are developed for each communication task in order to arrive at a total budget estimate. This method is time-consuming and complex, and as a consequence has been less widely used in practice, however, recent research suggests that more marketers are taking up this approach.

==== Competitive parity method ====
The competitive parity method allocates the advertising or promotional budget based on competitive spending for comparable activities. This approach is a defensive strategy used to protect a brand market position. It assumes that rival firms have similar objectives and is widely used in highly competitive markets. The main criticism of this method is that it assumes competitors know what they are doing in relation to advertising expenditure.

There are several approaches to using the competitive parity method:

a) Allocate the same budget on advertising as a key rival;
b) Allocate the budget based on the industry average expenditure levels;
c) Allocate a similar percentage-of-sales as a key competitor;
d) Allocate the same percentage-of-sales on advertising as the industry average;
e) Use competitive activity as a benchmark to which sums are added or subtracted based on managerial judgement.

Competitive parity requires a detailed understanding of competitor's expenditure in key areas. Market intelligence used to inform this approach can be obtained by consulting company annual reports and also from commercial research service providers such as Nielsen's AdEx.

Other methods used to set advertising and promotional budgets include the market share method, unit sales method, all available funds method, affordable method, marginal analysis and others. Contemporary budgeting rarely relies on a single method, but instead uses a combination of methods to guide the marketer in determining the optimal expenditure levels.

=== Devising the creative strategy ===
The creative strategy is also known as the message strategy. The creative strategy explains how the advertising campaign will address the advertising objectives. Developing the creative strategy typically begins by identifying the big idea (also known as the creative concept that will establish the intended product position in the minds of the customer. Another way of thinking about the creative concept is that it refers to the one thing that will make consumers respond. The creative concept should show how the product benefit meets the customer's needs or expectations in a unique way.

Laskey et al. developed a typology of nine creative strategies. Initially devised for television, this typology has been widely adopted for other media including print media and social media.

Laskey, Day and Crask's typology first identifies two broad classes of creative strategy:

- Informational: rational appeals that typically provide information about the brand's benefits
- Transformational: emotional appeals that assist consumers to imagine an aspirational lifestyle

Informational appeals typically involve factual claims that list the product's benefits in a straightforward manner and are more likely to be used with high involvement goods. Transformational appeals play on emotions and are designed to transform the consumer's perceptions of themselves or of the product. Transformational appeals are more likely to be indicated for low-involvement goods or services. Emotional appeals are often known as a soft-sell approach. Because they bypass rational cognitive processing, transformational appeals are less likely to result in counter-arguing in the consumer's mind.

Typology of Creative Strategies
Informational	Description	Uses
Comparative	Explicit comparison of brand and rival(s)	Use with care in competitive markets
Unique Selling Proposition (USP)	Highlight a unique benefit that is meaningful to consumers	Use in categories with high levels of technological differentiation
Pre-emptive	Be the first to use a common attribute or benefit	Use when differentiation is difficult or impossible
Hyperbole	Gross exaggeration to highlight unique benefit	Use when brand has demonstrable point of difference
Generic informational	Focus on product category	Use for new categories, new products or repositioning
Transformational		
User Image	Focus on the consumer's lifestyles e.g. activities, interests, work	
Brand Image	Claim of superiority based on extrinsic factors such as customer perceptions, designed to give the brand a 'personality'	Use with low-tech goods where differentiation is difficult e.g. coolness, prestige
Use Occasion	Focus on the brand experience, the ownership experience, the shopping experience or the consumption experience	Use with experiential goods where differentiation is difficult
Generic	Focus on product class with emotional appeal	Use for new categories, new products or repositioning

In addition to determining the overall creative strategy, the advertiser also needs to consider the creative execution – which refers to the way that the message is presented. Examples of creative execution include: problem-solution formats, fear appeals, sex appeals, humour, parody, slogans or jingles, mnemonics, slice-of-life, guarantee, celebrity endorsement, testimonial, news style, scientific appeals, dramatisation and product demonstration.

=== Media planning ===
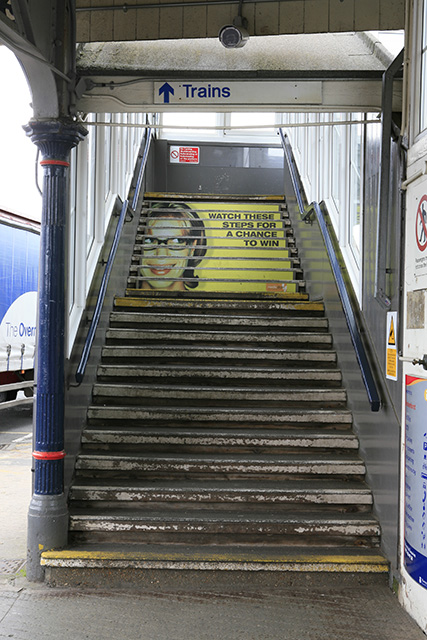
Integrating the creative and the media can result in imaginative and powerful messages that grab attention and are noticed.

Strategic media planning consists of four key decision areas:

1) Setting media objectives (with reference to both marketing and advertising objectives);

2) Developing a media channel strategy for implementing media objectives – the broad vision of when and how to reach target audiences;

3) Designing media tactics – specific instructions about media vehicles, placement, preferred position;

4) Devising procedures for evaluating the effectiveness of the media plan.

The traditional approach to media strategy was primarily concerned with setting objectives for message reach, weight and frequency. The contemporary approach, however, often treats the media strategy as an extension of the creative strategy. For example, L'Oreal Men's Expert promoted its skincare range on dry-cleaner hangers. When customers picked up their shirt, they found a $2 coupon and a message, "Your shirt doesn't come with wrinkles, why should your face?" This novel execution shows how media and creative can be integrated to generate powerful advertising.

==== Setting media objectives ====
In terms of setting media objectives, the planner needs to address several key decisions:

- Who do we want to talk to? (Target market/ audience definition)
- How often does an audience member need to hear our message before it is noticed or achieves the desired consumer response? (Effective frequency)
- When do audiences cease to notice the ad, or become tired of seeing the ad? (Advertising wear-out)

A number of key definitions are essential for media planning purposes:

Reach is defined as the number of households (or people) exposed to an advertising message in a given time period.
Frequency is defined as the average number of times a household (or person) is exposed to an advertising message in a given time period.
Effective frequency refers to the minimum number of media exposures in order to achieve a specified communication goal
Effective reach refers to the reach (% of households or people) at the effective frequency level.
Gross Ratings Points (GRPs) is defined as reach multiplied by frequency and is a measure of overall campaign weight or intensity

With respect to reach objectives, planners must decide what proportion of the target market need to be exposed to the advertising message. It is not always necessary to reach 100% of the target market. For new brands or brands with very low levels of awareness, it may be desirable to reach every member of the target market. However, for reminder type campaigns lower levels of reach may be all that is required. Reach objectives are normally framed in terms of a percentage of market. For example, a reach objective might read; To reach 50% of women aged 18–25 years.

With respect to frequency objectives, the planner must determine the optimal level of frequency in order to achieve the desired communications objective. Media planners often work with rules of thumb for setting frequency objectives that are based on an extensive body of evidence drawn from research findings. For example, empirical evidence suggests that the average consumer needs to be exposed to a message at least three times before they become aware of the brand information. This is sometimes known as the 3+ Rule. To this basic benchmark of three exposures, media planners recognise that to achieve higher-level communication goals, such as persuasion and lead generation, higher levels of frequency are required. To achieve simple brand awareness, three exposures may be sufficient, but for consumers to act on that awareness, higher levels of exposure may be required. Some theorists have developed sophisticated decision models to assist with planning optimal frequency levels.

Planners also need to consider the combined effects of reach and frequency (GRPs). In an intensive campaign, the schedule will utilise both broad reach (expose more people to the message) and high frequency (expose people multiple times to the message). The overall campaign weight has implications for budgets and for media selection. In an intensive campaign (heavy weight campaign), the media strategy is normally skewed towards main media, which remains the most cost efficient means of reaching large audiences with the relatively high frequency needed to create stable brand awareness levels.

==== Media channel strategy ====
The first channel decision that needs to be made is whether to use a concentrated channel strategy or a dispersion channel strategy:

Concentrated channel strategy
In a concentrated approach the planner invests most of the media expenditure in a single medium or a narrow range or media.
Dispersion channel strategy
In a dispersion approach, the planner spends across a broad range of advertising media. The main advantage of a concentrated channel strategy is that the advertiser has the opportunity to achieve a high share-of- voice and can become the dominant advertiser in the selected channels. A dispersion approach allows the advertiser to reach a broader cross-section of the defined target market.

With reach and frequency objectives firmly in place, the planner turns to determining the media mix and selecting appropriate media vehicles to carry the message. The media planner must determine the way that the advertising budget is to be allocated across the relevant media options (e.g. 50% TV; 30% Mags; 15% Digital and 5% Out-of-home). To make these decisions, the planner requires a detailed understanding of the target market and its media usage habits. Accordingly, the design of the media channel strategy requires a rich understanding of the media options and what each type of media can accomplish in terms of audience reach and engagement.

Overview of Main Advertising Media
Medium	Advantages	Disadvantages
	Television: Excellent mass market coverage; Low relative cost (i.e. cost per thousand exposures); Colour, sound and movement permit many creative possibilities; Good attention	Minimal geographic & demographic audience selectivity; Cost of spots is high (in absolute terms); Production costs are high; Clutter; Short life; ephemeral; Consumers can avoid exposure (via zapping)
	Radio: Spots are relatively inexpensive; High levels of reach and frequency; Some geographic and demographic selectivity; Message delivered in consumer's home or work environment; Short life	Lacks vision and movement – limited creative possibilities; Non-standard rate structures
	Newspapers: Broad coverage of national markets; High level of frequency and immediacy; Message delivered in home, car or work environment; Often the last medium to be consulted before shopping; Short lead times (for production and insertion)	Short life; Low attention; Clutter; Limited use of colour; Poor production quality
	Magazines: Able to select targeted audiences; Longer life – more opportunities to notice ads; High quality production values; Can add to brand prestige; High pass-along effect	Expensive; Long lead times; Limited frequency
	Cinema: Some audience selectivity; Able to reach youth audiences; Captive audience – high attention; High production values and big screen viewing; Relatively low cost; Minimal clutter	Creativity can be challenging; Minimal frequency; Limited reach
	Transit (bus, train, tram, cable-car, taxi): Able to reach audiences when they are out shopping; Relatively low cost	Minimal audience selectivity; Creativity can be a challenge
	Out-of-home (billboards, posters, street furniture, signage, footpath artetc.): Able to reach mobile audiences; Good creative possibilities; Some audience selectivity (e.g. billboards near sports venues)	Static; Creativity can be a challenge
	Internet-based and digital: Immediacy; Potential for two-way communications; Relatively low cost; Pay per number of views; Able to reach global audiences; Selective targeting	Creativity can be a challenge; Clutter

==== Media audience research ====
Media audience research is a central feature of media planning. The main purpose of media research is "to eliminate waste in advertising by objectively analysing the media available for promoting products and services". Identifying and profiling the audience for print media, broadcast media, cinema and online media magazine or newspaper is a specialized form of market research, often conducted on behalf of media owners. In most nations, the advertising industry, via its peak industry associations, endorses a single media research company as the official provider of audience measurement for main media. The methodology used by the official provider then becomes known as the industry currency in audience measurement. Industry members fund the audience research and share the findings. In a few countries, where the industry is more fragmented or where there is no clear peak industry association, two or more competing organisations may provide audience measurement services. In such countries, there is said to be no industry currency.

Research companies employ different methodologies depending on where and when media is used and the cost of data collection. All these methods involve sampling – that is taking a representative sample of the population and recording their media usage which is then extrapolated to the general population. Media owners typically share research findings with prospective advertisers, while selected findings are available to the general public via the media research company or an entity, such as a broadcast commission, established to administer the audience research process.

Media research acts as form of industry regulation and the legitimacy of research methodologies and provision of audience metrics. Media owners rely on metrics of both audience size and audience quality to set advertising rates.

Measures of media audience that are of especial interest to advertisers include:

Print Media

- Circulation: the number of copies of an issue sold (independently assessed via a circulation audit)
- Readership: the total number of people who have seen or looked into a current edition of the a publication (independently measured via survey)
- Readership profiles: Demographic/ psychographic and behavioural analysis of readership (sourced from Readership surveys)

Broadcast Media

- Average audience: The average number of people who tuned into the given time or given program, expressed in thousands or as a percentage. Also known as a Rating or T.A.R.P (Total Audience Rating Point).
- Audience share: The number of listeners (or viewers) for a given channel over a given time period, expressed as a percentage of the total audience potential for the total market. (The audience share is normally calculated by dividing a given channel's average audience by the average audience of all channels).
- Audience potential: The total number of people in a given geographical area who conform to a specific definition, such as the number of people with a television (or radio) set or the total number of people aged 6–12 years. Population potentials are normally derived from the census figures and are used to estimate the potential market reach.
- Audience movement by session: The number of listeners (or viewers) who switch channels during a given time period.
- Audience profile: Analysis of audience by selected demographic, psychographic or behavioural variables.
- Cumulative audience (CUME): The number of different listeners (or viewers) in a given time period; also known as reach.
- People Using Television (PUT): The number of people (or households) tuned to any channel during a given time period.

Out-of-home media

- Opportunities to see (OTS) – a crude measure of the number of people who were exposed to the medium, For example, the number of cars that drive past an outdoor billboard in a given time period

Internet and digital media

- Site traffic: The number of visitors to a website within a given time period (e.g. a month)
- Unique visitors: The number of different visitors to a website within a given time period
- Site stickiness: The average length of time a person remains on a page (a measure of audience engagement)
- Average page views per visit: The number of different pages generated by a visitor to a site (a measure of engagement)
- Click through rate (CTR): The number of people who clicked on an advertisement or advertising link
- Cost per click (CPS): The average cost of generating one click through
- Rate of return visitors: The number of unique visitors who return to a site
- Bounce rate: Number of site visitors who leave the site within a predetermined time (seconds)

Although much of the audience research data is only available to subscribers and prospective advertisers, basic information is published for the general public, often as topline survey findings. The type and depth of freely available information varies across geographic markets. The following table provides principal sources of information for main media audience research in English speaking markets.

Sources of Broadcast Audience Data ( Main English speaking markets)
Country	Radio	Television
Australia	Commercial Radio Australia	OZTAM
Britain	Radio Joint Audience Research	Broadcasters' Audience Research Board
Canada	Numeris*	Numeris*
India	Nielsen Media Research's RAM	TAM Media Research (a joint venture between AC Nielsen and Kantar Media)
Ireland	Broadcast Authority of Ireland	TAM Ireland
Malaysia**	Nielsen (Malaysia)	Nielsen Media (US) and Kantar Media ***
New Zealand	Radio NZ	Think TV ****
United States	Nielsen Audio	Nielsen
South Africa	Broadcast Research Council	Broadcast Research Council

Notes:
* Also see Nielsen Media, for Trends in Canadian TV Viewing
** English is one of the three official languages spoken in Malaysia. Print and broadcast media are normally segmented into language first and demographics second.
*** There is so single, official currency for measuring TV audiences in Malaysia. Currently two competing companies provide data, using different methodologies (Nielsen Media and Kantar Media)
**** Think TV is a consortium of commercial TV networks that oversees the TV ratings process

==== Media buying ====
While it is certainly possible for advertisers to purchase advertising spots by dealing directly with media owners (e.g. newspapers, magazines or broadcast networks), in practice most media buying is purchased as part of broader negotiations. Prices depend on the advertiser's prior relationship with the network, the volume of inventory being purchased, the timing of the booking and whether the advertiser is using cross-media promotions such as product placements. Advertising spots purchased closer to airtime tend to be more expensive.

Many advertisers opt to centralise their media buying through large media agencies such as Zenith or Optimedia. These large media agencies are able to exert market power through volume purchasing by buying up space for an entire year. Media agencies benefit advertisers by providing advertising units at lower rates and also through the provision of added value services such as media planning services.

Buying advertising spots on national TV is very expensive. Given that most media outlets use dynamic pricing, rates vary from day to day, creating difficulties locating indicative rates. However, from time to time, trade magazines publish adrates which may be used as a general guide. The following table provides indicative advertising rates for selected popular programs on American national television networks, broadcast during prime time viewing hours.

Advertising rates, selected US TV programs, 2010
Program/ Network	Network	Broadcast Day / Time	Rate (per 30 second spot)
American Idol *	Fox	Day not stated, prime-time	$360,000 – $490,000
Sunday Night Football	NBC	Sunday, prime-time	$435,000
Family Guy	Fox	Sunday, prime-time	$215,000
Saturday Night College Football	ABC	Saturday, prime-time	$140,000
Survivor	CBS	Thursday, prime-time	$152,000
The Biggest Loser	NBC	Tuesday, prime-time	$128,000
Jay Leno **	NBC	Mon-Fri, Late-night	$48,800 – $65,000

Notes:

* Rates for programs such as American Idol increase as the program moves closer to finals
** Rates for Mon-Fri programs such as Jay Leno vary depending on the day of the week and the expected audience size

==== Pulling it all together: Media tactics and the media schedule ====
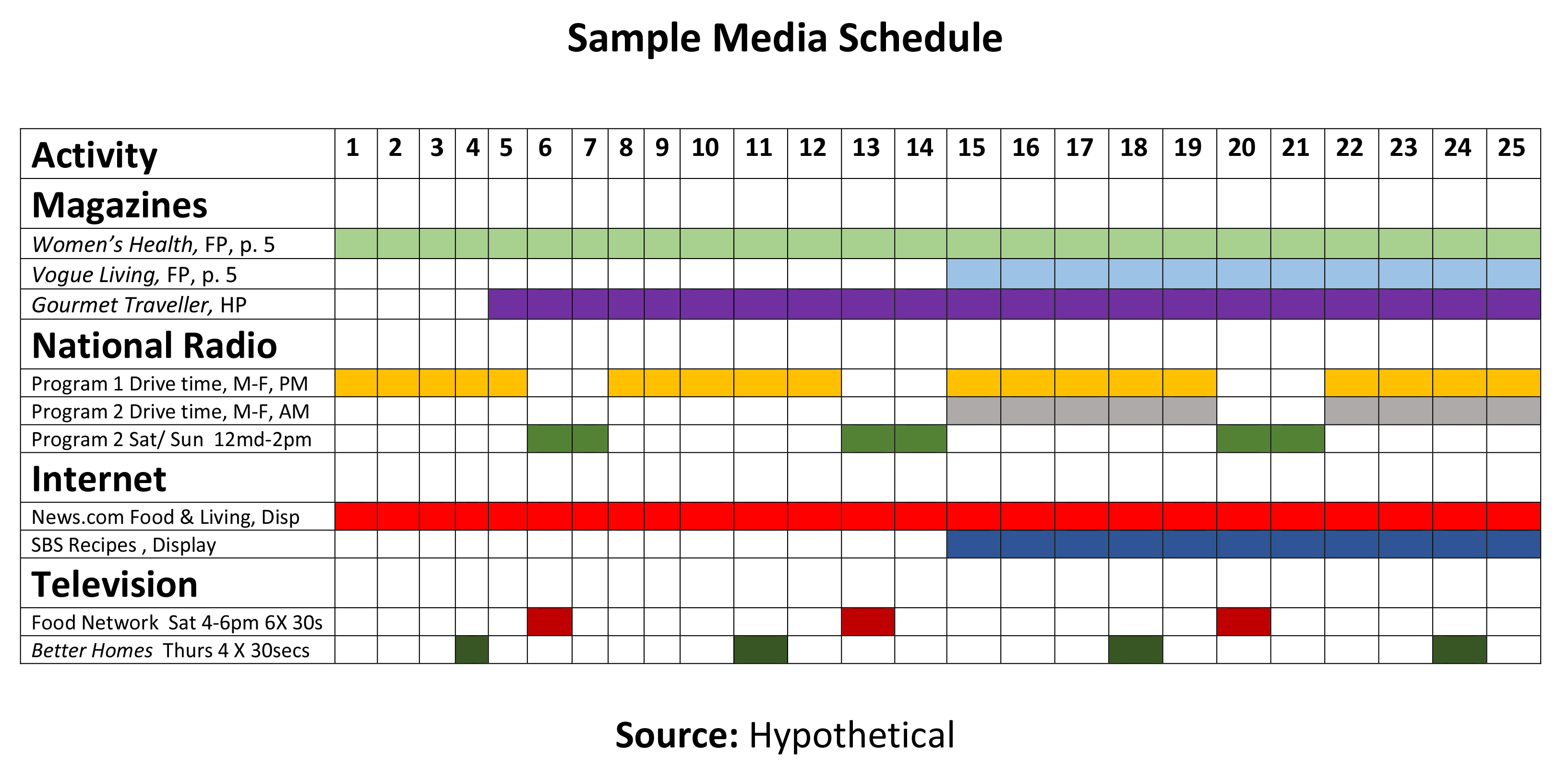
The media schedule includes specific detail such as dates, media, position, placement.

A media schedule is a program or plan that "identifies the media channels used in an advertising campaign, and specifies insertion or broadcast dates, positions, and duration of the messages".

Broadly, there are four basic approaches to scheduling:

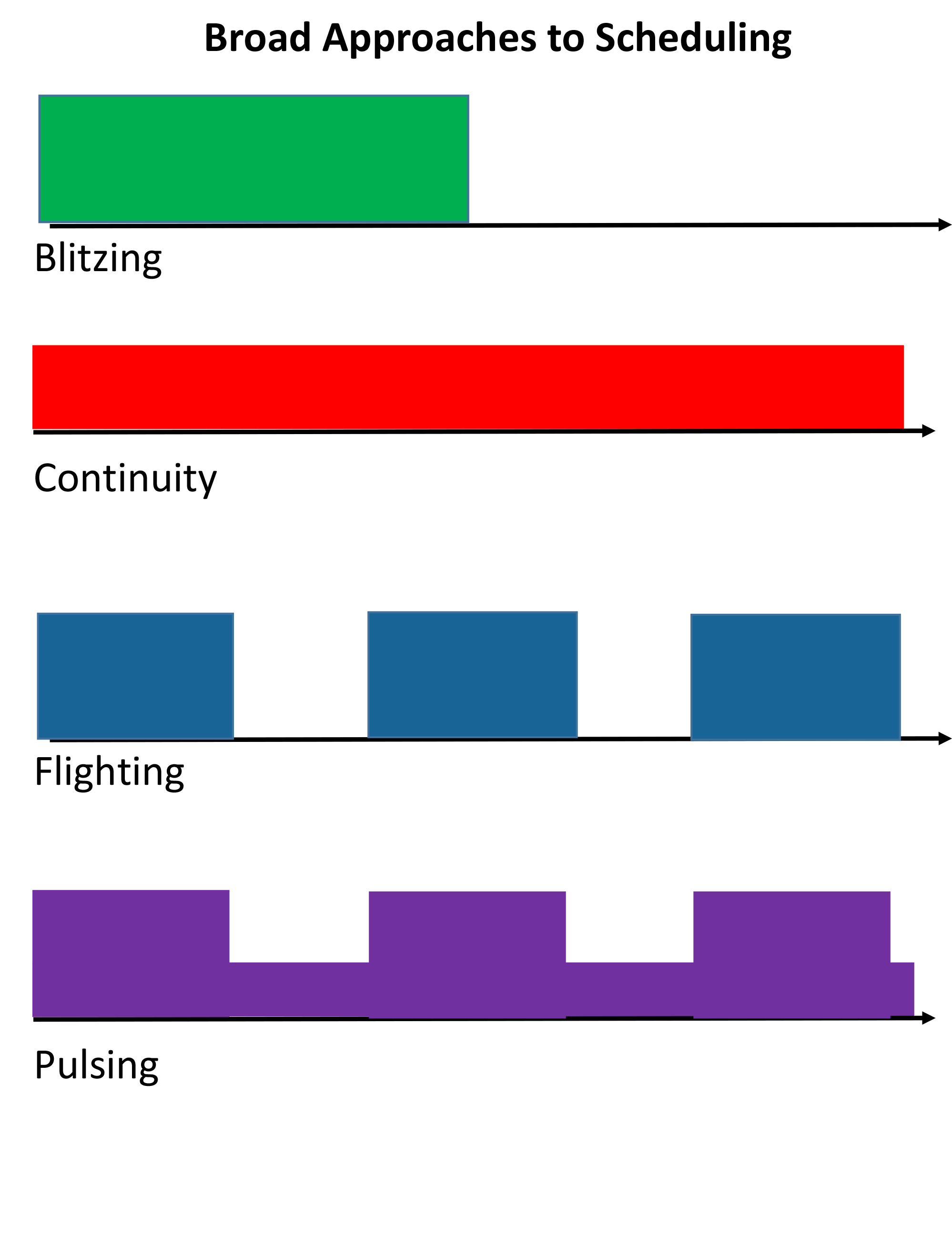
Blitzing, continuity, flighting and pulsing are the main schedule patterns.

Blitzing: one concentrated burst of intense levels of advertising, normally during the initial period of the planning horizon
Continuity: a pattern of relatively constant levels throughout a given time period or campaign (i.e. a relatively expensive spending pattern)
Flighting: an intermittent pattern of bursts of advertising followed by no advertising (i.e. a moderate spending pattern)
Pulsing: a combination of both continuity and pulsing; low levels of continuous advertising followed by bursts of more intense levels of advertising; (i.e. alternates between a high spending pattern and a low spending pattern)

Empirical support for the effectiveness of pulsing is relatively weak. However, research suggests that continuous schedules and flighted schedules generally result in strong levels of consumer recall. With flighted schedules, the second and subsequent flights tend to build on the first flight, resulting in awareness levels similar to a continuous schedule, but often with reduced costs.

A major consideration in constructing media schedules is timing. The advertiser's main is to place the advertisement as close as practical to the point where consumers make their purchase decision. For example, an advertiser who knows that a grocery buyer does a main shop on Saturday afternoons and a top-up shop on Wednesday nights, may consider TV to achieve general brand awareness, supplemented with radio spots to reach the shopper while he or she is driving to the supermarket or regular place of purchase on the days when the majority of consumers carry out their shopping.

== Measuring advertising effectiveness ==
Advertising is a major expense for most firms. Improved advertising effectiveness can deliver strategic and tactical advantages as well as helping to manage costs. Advertising managers are expected to be accountable for advertising budgets. Hence, most campaigns invest in a number of measures to evaluate whether advertising budgets are being well-spent and to assess whether the campaign requires improvement and, if necessary, to fine-tune campaigns in order to achieve the desired advertising effects. The main aim of effectiveness testing is to improve consumer response rates. Broadly, there are two classes of effectiveness testing: Tracking refers to a combination of both pre-testing and post-testing in order to provide continuous monitoring of advertising effects.

- Pre-testing: qualitative and quantitative measures taken prior to running an advertisement with a view to gauging audience response and eliminating potential weaknesses

- Post-testing: qualitative and quantitative measures taken during or after the target audience has been exposed to the message or advertising campaign and used to track the extent to which advertising is achieving the desired communications objectives.

=== Pre-testing ===
Sound pre-testing exhibits the following characteristics:

(i) relevant to the communications objectives;
(ii) agree on how results are to be used;
(iii) use multiple measures;
(iv) be theoretically grounded – i.e. based on a model of human response (e.g. hierarchy of effects);
(v) consider multiple exposures;
(vi) test comparably finished executions;
(vii) control the exposure context;
(viii) define the relevant sample;
(ix) demonstrate reliability and validity;
(x) take baseline (i.e., pre-exposure) measurements and/or use control groups

Specific types of pre-testing include copy tests, projective techniques and increasingly, a diverse range of physiological and/or biometric testing methods.

==== Copy testing ====
Copy testing is testing that evaluates advertising copy and creative executions. In this section, the principal methods of copy testing are briefly discussed.

===== Mock-ups =====
A template used for storyboards

Researchers often use mock-ups of the final creative with varying degrees of finished artwork. Some mock-ups are only intended to be seen by the advertising agency and client during the advertising concept development stage. However, mock-ups are useful for gauging audience response to the proposed advertising copy. Mock-ups can be used in face-to-face interviews, small focus groups or theatre tests. A sample of respondents is invited to look at the mock-ups and subsequently asked a series of questions designed to capture advertising effects that are of interest for the given campaign.

Types of advertising mock-ups that are used in copy testing, both print and broadcast advertising, include:

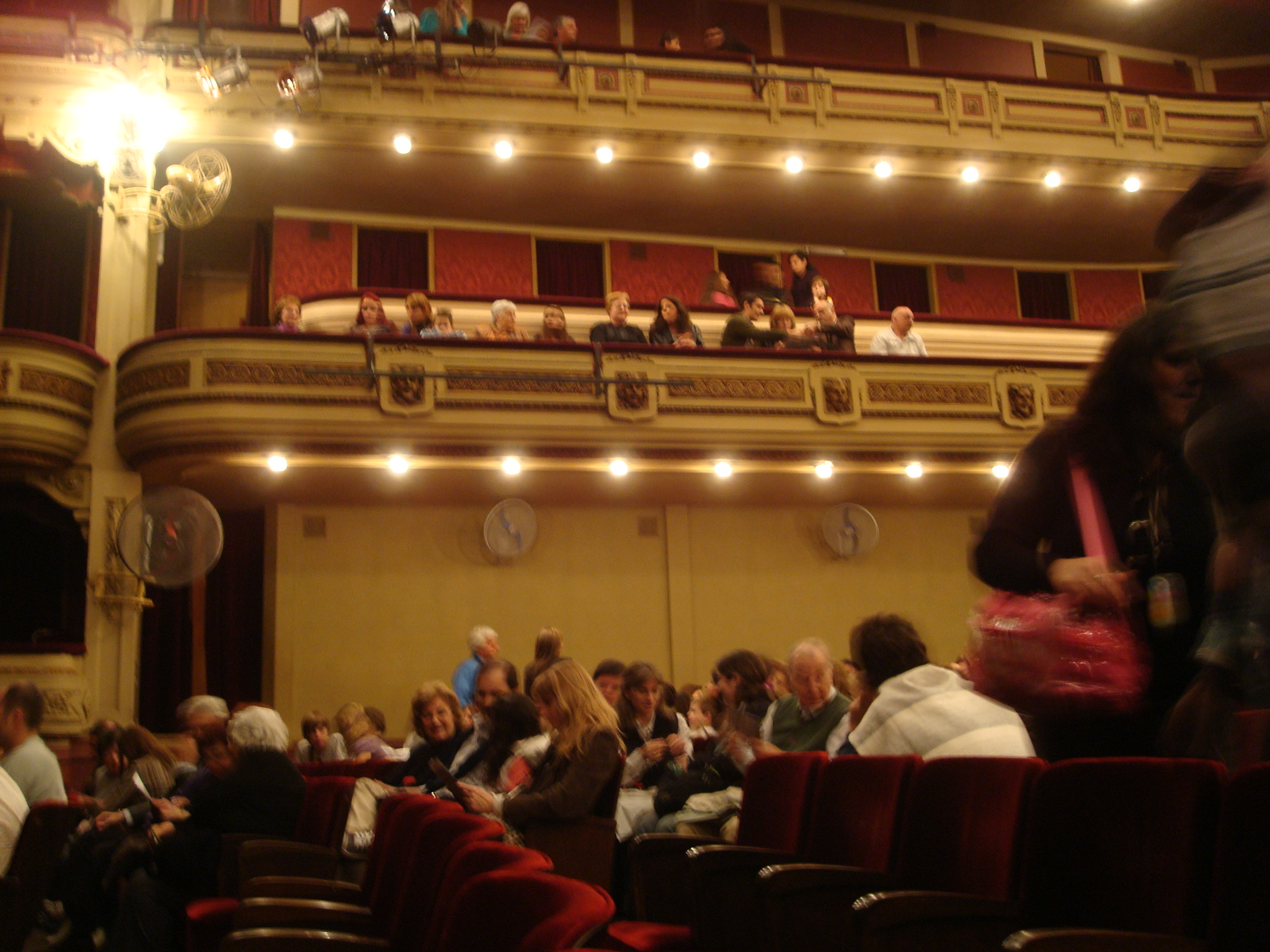
To pre-test advertisements, researchers might use face-to-face interviews, small focus groups or theatre tests for larger audiences.

Rough art: very rough drawings of the creative concept

Comps: (abbreviation of "composition art") refers to rough art included along with copy, slogans and campaign strategy

Rip-o-matics: very rough versions of a TV commercial that include stock images and film footage designed to emulate the look and feel of the final creative execution; rip-o-matic are often called "mood" or "concept" videos.

Photo-matics: include photographs along with the intended audio

Storyboards: a sequence of drawings or photographs accompanied by relevant copy and designed to resemble the final creative execution of a film or digital TV commercial.

Animatics: a more elaborate version of a storyboard that includes dialogue, soundtracks and voice overs that are intended to represent a more polished version of the final creative execution.

===== Projective techniques =====
In projective techniques, the respondent is invited to project themselves into the advertisement. There are many projective techniques including word association, sentence completion and story completion. These techniques assume that when exposed to incomplete stimuli, respondents use underlying attitudes or motivations to complete the storyline, thereby revealing their fears and aspirations that may not surface under more direct questioning. Projective techniques have been found to be very useful for evaluating concepts and generating new concepts.

==== Physiological measures ====
For decades, researchers have been using physiological measures to study such responses to advertising. These measures include such things as pupil response, electrode mal response (GSR) and heart rate. These measures have been shown to be effective measures of attention and the strength of emotional response. With the rise of consumer neuroscience, researchers have begun to use a much wider range of measures to investigate cognitive responses as well as emotional responses.

Some of the techniques used to measure consumer responses to advertising stimuli include:

===== Pupil dilation =====
The amount of pupil dilation (also known as pupillometry) is believed to provide a relatively precise measure of the amount of mental effort associated with a task. Pupil dilation tests became a staple of advertising copy testing during the 1970s as a way to test consumers' responses to television commercials. Pupil dilation suggests a stronger interest in the stimuli and can be associated with arousal and action. Pupil dilation is not only used to study advertising, but also used to investigate product and package design.

===== Eye tracking =====
While viewing an advertisement, a sensor aims a beam of infrared light at the eye and follows the movement to show the spot on which the viewer is focusing. This shows the length of time the viewer focuses on each element of the image and the general sequence used to interpret the image. Eye tracking is often used to fine tune advertising executions. Research studies suggest that eye tracking is associated with brand recognition, but less useful for brand recall.

===== Galvanic skin response (GSR) =====
Galvanic skin response uses a device, called a galvanometer, which is very similar to a lie detector, designed to measure minute amounts of skin perspiration and electrical activity in the skin. Changes in skin response are associated with arousal and are an indicator of the advertisement's ability to capture attention.

===== Electroencephalograph (EEG) =====
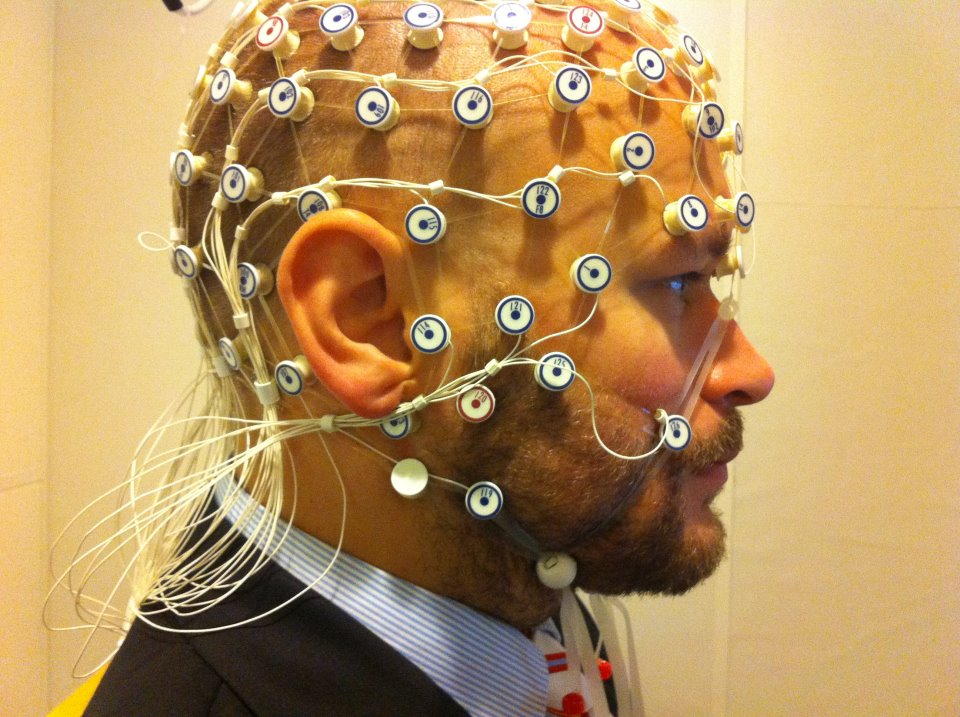
EEG testing is more invasive.

An electroencephalograph (EEG) is a device that measures changes in brain-wave activity. EEG testing can detect emotional arousal which is difficult to detect using alternative testing methods. Arousal is an indicator of the advertisement's ability to grab attention and engage the consumer in the message. EEG testing is a cumbersome and invasive testing method which militates against routine use in advertising testing.

===== Functional magnetic resonance imaging (FmRI) =====
FmRI is a technique that enables researchers to monitor activity in specific areas of the brain. This technique has been used to identify specific brain networks associated with pleasure and arousal associated with advertising.

=== Post-testing ===
The aim of post-testing is to provide indicators of how well a given campaign is achieving the desired communications objectives, so that corrective action and fine-tuning can occur during the campaign as well as to evaluate the effectiveness of advertising expenditure in order to provide benchmarks for future advertising programs. Techniques used in post-testing depend on the media employed, and may include such tests as Starch scores, day-after recall tests (DAR), campaign tracking, advertising ROI and other measures.

==== Starch scores ====
Starch scores were developed by Daniel Starch in the 1920s to evaluate the copy effectiveness of print advertisements and are still in use today. A consumer is shown a magazine page by page and subsequently asked whether they had noticed any part an advertisement. If they answer, 'Yes', the interviewer asks the respondent to indicate which parts of the ad were noticed. For each advertisement, three scores are calculated:

(1) Noted – the percentage of readers who recognize the advertisement as one they previously saw in the magazine issue (designed to capture the advertisement's ability to grab attention)
(2) Associated – the percentage of readers who saw or read any part of the advertisement that clearly indicated the brand advertised (designed to indicate the level of brand processing)
(3) Read most – the percentage of readers who read half or more of the ad's written material (an indicator of reader involvement or engagement)

==== Day-after-recall tests (DARs) ====
Day-after-recall (DAR) tests were developed by George Gallup in the 1940s and are still used. DAR tests provide a measure of the percentage of the people who recall something specific about an ad (e.g., sales message or a visual) the day following exposure. Interviewers ask questions designed to elicit:

(a) Unaided recall – when respondents remember any commercials for the product category in question
(b) Aided recall – when respondents remember seeing a commercial for Brand X
(c) Copy points – when respondents can recall what the brand showed, looked like and the main points of the commercial

==== Tracking ====
Ad tracking or campaign tracking refers to techniques used to monitor the "in-market performance" of advertising. Ad tracking uses a combination of pre-testing and post-testing. Pre-testing is used to establish benchmarks against which the actual performance of a campaign can be measured during and after the campaign has run. A particular area of concern during an advertising campaign is the problem of advertising wear-out. When audiences are repeatedly exposed to the same message, the level of attention begins to plateau and eventually decays. Any further repetitions may cease to be noticed or may alienate target audiences. When wear-out occurs, additional advertising expenditure is simply wasted. One way that advertisers avoid wear-out is to use repetition with variation – that is, the use of different executions of the same message. Campaign tracking can assist advertisers to determine when to introduce a new execution of the same advertising message or to fine-tune the campaign.

==== Advertising return on investment (ROI) ====
Advertising return on investment (advertising ROI) is designed to ensure that the right advertising tactics were employed. Good measures of advertising ROI should consider both short term and long term measures. Online campaigns and co-operative advertising are useful for building sales, while television and PR are essential to long-term brand building and customer loyalty.

== Careers ==
Advertising management is a career path in the advertising or marketing industries. Advertising and promotions managers may work for an agency, a public relations firm, a media outlet, or may be hired directly by a company to work in their in-house agency where they would take responsibility for communications designed to develop the company's brands or group of brands. In the agency environment, advertising managers are often known as account managers and their role involves working closely with client firms. In a marketing department, the advertising manager's position can include supervising employees, acting as a liaison between multiple agencies working on a project, or creating and implementing promotional campaigns.

== See also ==
- Advertising campaign
- Account planning
- Attitude-toward-the-ad models
- Audience measurement
- Consumer behaviour
- Creative brief
- Criticism of advertising
- Digital marketing
- Digital promotion
- Elaboration likelihood model
- History of advertising
- Integrated marketing communications
- List of magazines by circulation
- List of most-listened-to radio programs
- List of most watched television broadcasts
- Marketing communications
- Media relations
- Native advertising
- Online advertising
- Positioning (marketing)
- Promotional mix
- Share of voice
- Shock advertising
- Sustainability advertising

=== Advertising for special markets or products ===
- Advertising to children
- Advertising in the Middle East
- Political advertising campaign
- Cosmetics advertising
- Stealth marketing
- Tobacco advertising
- Toy advertising

=== Award winning campaigns ===
- Share a Coke
- Coca-Cola's Hillsong campaign
- Slip-Slop-Slap (Anti-Cancer Institute of Australia) Winner of the International Sulzberger Award, 2010

=== Influential thinkers in advertising and advertising research ===
- N. W. Ayer & Son – probably the first advertising agency to use mass media (i.e. telegraph) in a promotional campaign
- William Bernbach (1911–1982) – promoted the idea that the creative execution is just as important as the creative content
- Ernest Dichter – developed the field of motivational research, used extensively in advertising
- E. St. Elmo Lewis – developed the first hierarchy of effects model (AIDA) used in sales and advertising
- Arthur Nielsen – founded one of the earliest international advertising agencies and developed ratings for radio & TV
- David Ogilvy (businessman) – pioneered the positioning concept and advocate of the use of brand image in advertising
- Charles Coolidge Parlin (1872–1942) – regarded as the pioneer of the use of marketing research in advertising
- Rosser Reeves (1910–1984) – developed the concept of the unique selling proposition (USP) and advocated the use of repetition in advertising
- Al Ries – advertising executive, author and credited with coining the term, 'positioning' in the late 1960s
- Daniel Starch – developed the Starch score method of measuring print media effectiveness (still in use)
- J Walter Thompson – one of the earliest advertising agencies
