= Advertising in the Middle East =

Advertising in the Middle East are derived from traditional, societal, political, and religious influences.

== Egypt ==

Of Middle Eastern countries, Egypt is more lenient than others on rules and regulations of advertising and media. The Egyptian constitution guarantees freedom of the media, and for the most part the government is respectful of that, but there are still laws in place to restrict the media. However, in the 2005 presidential election, the office director for Information Minister Ahmed Selim declared they were entering an era of "free, transparent and independent Egyptian media."

Egypt is traditionally a print based advertising in media. It was not until 1995 that Egypt had nearly 100 television channels. Once television became popular, private broadcasters were not allowed to broadcast their own news, instead they were to stick to entertainment. The Ministry of Information was the organization that controlled content in state-owned broadcast media. Fortunately, Egypt was the first Middle Eastern country to have its own satellite. Traditionally, advertisement in Egypt has been very conservative in content. Gender roles were reinforced heavily and controversial topics were not addressed. Then, and even now, certain objects are still not shown in advertising such as alcohol and undergarments, as they are seen as "immoral" by government authorities and some of the public. In more modern times, women are becoming a force in advertising.

Egypt is now in a post-revolution era. As a result, a lot has opened up to marketers and advertisers on what they can and want to do. This revolution can be capitalized on very well as long as marketers respect and honor the spirit of the movement. Advertisements will now be seeing a new audience with different wants, needs and expectations. Women's issue and rights movements are beginning to take place through advertising campaigns as well as social media in Egypt is taking off, especially Facebook. The National Council for Women launched a campaign back in 2016 empowering women to ‘break barriers and not accept society’s narrow perceptions’. Also, because of the popularity of Facebook many advertising mediums are using the classic ‘like button’ icon in their ads to appeal to their newly informed audience. Online advertising is also proving to be very successful as it is now much easier to access and see. There is also massive market for online adverting as about half of Egypt's population is 29 years old or younger.

What this means for the future of Egypt is there is a growing job market in . New agencies and corporate positions will be created as a result in a higher demand for media experts. This also means more steps being taken towards freedom in the media. With a more progressive generation in charge of the media we will see it begin to alter and expand to fit their changing needs and to connect with the rest of the world.

== Israel ==
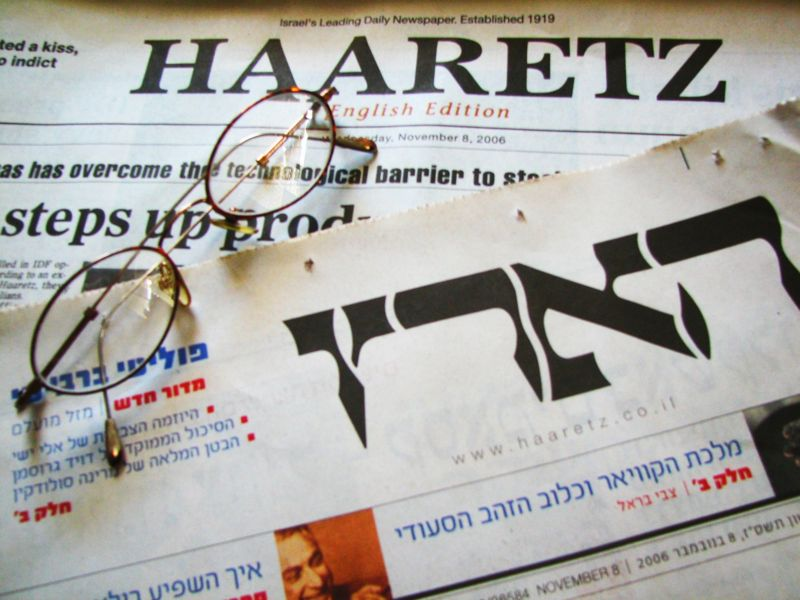
Front page of the Hebrew and English editions of Haaretz.

In 1922, the first Israeli advertising agency was established in Jerusalem. Many advertising agencies moved abroad after some successes but during the Holocaust; however, many Jewish advertising agencies were forced to close. Later, German immigrants began to open more agencies in the mid to late 1930s, resulting in an abundant advertising industry. After World War II, the expansion of American advertising agencies made it possible for Jewish agencies to gain credibility in the advertising field.

Haaretz, or “The Land” in English, is a daily newspaper located in Tel Aviv, Israel. It is printed in Hebrew and comes in an English edition. Haaretz has described itself as “a broadly liberal outlook both on domestic issues and on international affairs. Haaretz has a reputation of being very liberal amidst all the political and religious conflicts in Israel.

The daily newspaper, Hamodia which is based in Brooklyn, New York was founded on Haredi Judaism ideal, is a popular publication in Israel. The publication is against the printing and publishing of photographs of women, and is described as writing stories that align with the Torah and traditional views.

Globes is a daily business publication based in Rishon LeZion, Israel. Globes was one of the first daily publications in Israel to be published on the internet. The publications remain neutral when it comes to political involvement as it is primarily business focused.

The Israeli government abides by freedom of the press which is protected by the basic laws of Israel and independent judiciary. The Israeli government has implemented stricter guidelines that Palestinian journalists are to follow when reporting in Israel. Israeli media however, operate with little restrictions.

In 2017, Freedom House named Israel one of the freest countries. Today, censorship in Israeli media is fairly low and a majority of advertisements are published in print publications. There are restrictions on alcohol, cigarettes and pharmaceuticals. Advertising alcoholic beverages is banned during children's’ programs and if aired, they must provide discretion notices. Advertising cigarettes and promoting tobacco use is banned as well as promoting the use of pharmaceutical drugs outside of a professional or scientific setting.

Because there are little advertising regulations, there is a lot of room for false-advertising. According to Haaretz, 20% of ads in Israel that contain health claims are misleading. The Ministry of Health has worked to spread awareness about these falsehoods and urges consumers to research products before purchase. Israel though considered a small market, has a string of global ad agencies (mostly concentrated in Tel Aviv) — including McCann, FCB, JWT and Saatchi & Saatchi — have footprints in the Israeli market.

== Saudi Arabia ==

Saudi Arabia, an Arab state located in the Middle East and the home to the religion of Islam, is a country consisting of harsh geography including deserts and mountain regions. According to a study done on advertising in the region, its people are deeply rooted in the Islamic faith, and followers from all over the world make pilgrimage to the country to visit one or both of its two holy shrines: Mecca and Medina. In recent years, the region has become a hot spot for issues such as domestic terrorism and extremist attitudes. However, there have been several positive trends in recent years. In fact, The Washington Post reported that in the 2015 election that appointed Salman the leader of the country, women could vote and participate in the election process for the first time. While these are positive changes, the country still faces challenges when it comes to the future, and will likely remain at the forefront of international issues, partially due to its surplus of oil and natural gas.

In a region like Saudi Arabia where tradition plays a huge part in the overarching culture, advertising has had to adapt to the Arab values that dictate everyday life. This is especially true when it comes to how women are portrayed, if they are even portrayed at all. According to an article from Business Insider, it is not uncommon for nothing more than a woman's eyes to be shown in a typical Saudi advertisement.

Currently, Saudi Arabia accounts for 40% of all advertising expenditures in the region. Unlike Western countries like The United States, print is still the most popular media vehicle, with newspapers accounting for 61% of money spent, dwarfing even the television budget. Until the late 1990s, advertising wasn't really a part of Saudi culture. Most campaigns were on a smaller scale, a more local level. However, in recent years, even after the outbreak of war in Iraq, advertising and commercialization have increased in volume.

Even though the region may be more saturated with a variety of messages, the influence of censorship is still highly prevalent. According to a study, government has even been known to employ people to tear up advertisements in magazines and newspapers which do not comply with the established Islamic laws. Because of these extremely strict guidelines, many companies who are advertising in Saudi Arabia must completely change their communication strategy when targeting this region. It is not uncommon for the government to modify an advertisement to comply with the restrictions regarding how the subjects are portrayed.

Huge companies such as IKEA and Starbucks have dealt with both the pressure to assimilate to the modest, conservative values of the region as well as the backlash from the rest of the world after doing so. In 2012, IKEA released a routine catalogue showcasing the company's product line for the upcoming season. The issues distributed to people in Sweden, The United States and other countries the world over featured women throughout the catalogue. In Saudi Arabia however, the women had been airbrushed out. IKEA eventually released a statement apologizing for the decision and explaining that the choice to exclude women from the narrative totally went against their values. Starbucks dealt with a similar issue when the franchise opened its first locations in Saudi Arabia and removed their signature mermaid from the logo and replaced her with just a crown.

== Syria ==

Syria was under "emergency rule" from 1963 to 2011 when it was ruled by the Baath Party, which effectively allowed the one-party government to create and enforce whichever laws it chose. Even though the ban was lifted because of protest, Syria's government is still an authoritarian dictatorship. While article 43 of the newest Syrian constitution guarantees freedom of the media, advertising is heavily censored. The National Media Council regulates the media including distributing advertising licenses, but is effectively a government mouthpiece. Publishers are barred from providing content that affects "national unity and national security." In general, Syria has been described as having few advertisements. According to the World Health Organization, advertisements promoting beer, wine and spirits are banned in the country. In 1996, a decree was issued outlawing advertisements for tobacco products. Some products or services are simply banned in the country, likely meaning advertisements about those products are as well. Facebook, and presumably advertisements promoting it, was banned in 2007 (the ban was later lifted in 2011). Other social media sites including YouTube are also banned. Independent news media in Syria is banned and so is the use of foreign currencies in business deals.

Even though not directly referring to advertising, Freedom House said in 2017 that the press in Syria is not free, giving it the worst possible rating. All media in Syria are forced to practice self-censorship, meaning they have to restrict themselves to continue operating. Additionally, the country has been racked by civil war for over 7 years, leaving multiple areas outside government control meaning different rules for advertising in different areas. In areas controlled by the Islamic State of Iraq and the Levant (ISIL), civil freedoms including advertising freedom are sometimes more heavily restricted than in government controlled areas because ISIL's rule of law is based in Sharia Law. In areas controlled by the Syrian Kurds, there are generally more civil freedoms (which would include advertising freedoms).

== United Arab Emirates ==

Founded in 1971, the United Arab Emirates (UAE) has a strong religious influence that dictates much of the government. Advertising faces the same kind of rules, with negative and false information being punishable in most instances.

Instead of a central regulatory council, different sections of the government set rules and guidelines for what is acceptable. Generally, this comes down to respecting the state and Islam. This can be seen in the rules set by the UAE National Media Council, which regulates media companies, stating that advertisements cannot “blaspheme” Islamic beliefs or “offend the economic system of the State." Educational companies cannot disparage other companies in a way that “discredit or unfairly attack” another company. Depictions of alcohol or drug use is illegal in ads along with racism or other offensive ideas. Statements and claims made in advertisements must be accurate. Regulatory bodies can also ask for sentences to be reworded to prevent confusion.

Much of the enforcement of these regulations come after an illegal ad is released. With the ability to fine or close down a company and jail people involved, many companies self-regulate to avoid problems. The process of creating an advertisement is generally comparable to more western structure, with agencies working with clients and market researches to create the advertisement. The Advertising Business Group (ABG), formed by members including Google and Facebook, self-regulate to avoid violations of the UAE's rules. The ABG is the largest group in the area and in the future plans to focus on how to advertise in other markets in the UAE. Advertising in the UAE is the highest in the Gulf region. In the first quarter of 2017 they accounted for 46% of all advertising spending in the region.

Advertisers reach those in the UAE with more digital content than other countries in the middle-east. As of 2015 96% of those in the UAE used internet. The general middle-eastern person also tends to be more trusting in advertising compared to North America and Europe.
