= National Media Council (United Arab Emirates) =

Media regulator, 2006–2021

- المجلس الوطني للإعلام
- Official logo

Independent federal body overview
- Formed: 2006; 20 years ago
- Dissolved: 2021; 5 years ago
- Jurisdiction: United Arab Emirates
- Headquarters: Abu Dhabi
- Website: nmc.gov.ae/en-us

The National Media Council (Arabic: المجلس الوطني للإعلام, romanized: al-Majlis al-Watani li'al-Ealam; NMC) is a federal institution of the United Arab Emirates (UAE) that was established by virtue of Federal Law No. 1 of 2006. The institution regulates media in the UAE, which includes restricting and punishing domestic and foreign media outlets for content that the government considers objectionable.

== UAE Media Laws and Regulations ==
The UAE has several laws and resolutions that organize the media field, and the council undertakes a vital role in their implementation. The UAE has six main laws and resolutions: UAE Copyright Law 7 of 2002, Cabinet decision No. 4 of 2006 on the system the National Media Council, Cabinet decision No. 14 of 2006 on the system the National Media Council, Council of Ministers Resolution No. (70/13) for the year 2007 meeting No. 4 to regulate the exercise of some of the free media licenses, and President of the Council Decision No. 35 for the year 2012 on the criteria content and advertising media.

== NMC Relations ==
The National Media Council is interested in setting up relations with a number of media, government and academic institutions in order to achieve its main strategic goals. Such partners include: National Media Institutions, Regional and International Media Institutions, Media Free Zone, Federal and Local Institutions.

== NMC Structure ==
Besides its headquarters in Abu Dhabi, the UAE National Media Council has subsidiaries in the other Emirates. Former chairman of "Sky News Arabia", Minister of state Sultan Ahmed Al Jaber has chaired the NMC since May 2015. The council has a board that supervises several sub-committees undertaking specific missions. The UAE cabinet has approved the changes introduced to NMC structure by virtue of Resolution No. 9 of 2013 and Resolution No. 12 of 2013 that define this structure in accordance with "UAE Vision 2021".

== Current status ==
In accordance to the U.A.E.'s Federal Law No. 11 of 2016, the National Media Council is the legitimate federal entity for media regulation. However, in June 2021, the Media Regulatory Office has taken over many tasks formerly assigned to the National Media Council. In September 2021, the National Media Council's official website has been suspended indefinitely. Despite this, as of October 2021 there was no definitive evidence the National Media Council had been completely superseded.
