= Media strategy =

Concept in advertising and broadcasting

Media strategy, as used in the advertising or content delivery (online broadcasting) industries, is concerned with how messages will be delivered to consumers or niche markets. It involves identifying the characteristics of the target audience or market as well as who should receive messages and defining the characteristics of the media that will be used for the delivery of the messages, with the intent being to influence the behavior of the target audience or market pertinent to the initial brief. Examples of such strategies today have revolved around an Integrated Marketing Communications approach whereby multiple channels of media are used i.e. advertising, public relations, events, direct response media, etc.

This concept has been used among proponents of entertainment-education programming where pro-social messages are embedded into dramatic episodic programs to change the audiences attitudes and behaviors in such areas as family planning, literacy, nutrition, smoking, etc.

== Overview ==
Media is a means or tool that is used to express and communicate messages to targeted audiences. There are various types of media, including but not limited to visual media, audio media, and traditional folk art media. These can also overlap with each other, for example, television is a typical example of visual-audio media. Strategy, on the other hand, is a plan created to help an individual or organization to achieve certain goals. Media strategy, specifically, is commonly applied in the public relations, marketing and advertising industries. By leveraging different forms of media, media strategy could efficiently play a role in establishing customer relationships, building a brand image, and improving flattened sales revenue.

== Stages ==
In the way of generating a media strategy, there are three stages of building a strategic framework: initiation, diffusion, and maturity. Each stage will have its own focus. The initiation stage guides people to identify the target demographics and the corresponding best-fit channel by primary research and secondary research. Research findings will help understand the target audience in a deeper layer and thus avoid some potential risks as well as costly losses before implementation. Carrying out research is a key step to help decision-makers uncover the hidden side of the market and better understand the consumer behaviors accordingly. Once the target audience and media channel are determined, it is time for the diffusion stage. During this stage, people are motivated to think about what specific outcome they aim to achieve through the media strategy, which could be very diverse among different parties. For instance, non-profit organizations tend to raise public awareness by well-designed media strategy while public companies care about how many profits will be driven out of a media strategy. Finally in the maturity stage, the main focus is no longer the goal but monitoring. Monitoring what’s happening in social media platforms is likely to generate significant insights that will not be found in any previous stages.

== Case studies ==
Old Spice, an American male grooming product brand, found marketing success by orchestrating social media campaigns for a correct targeted social group. Even though men are the direct consumers of Old Spice body wash product, they rarely purchase it by themselves whereas women are the actual buyers of men’s body wash. In terms of such quantitative research findings, Old Spice tailored a series of social media campaigns to attract female consumers and finally led to a steep increase in sales. Therefore, media strategy could be especially beneficial and profit-driven when implemented to the right target audiences, and doing research is an efficient approach to verify the target group. Looking back to the Old Spice’s case, social media strategy is not just to create networking effects and viral influence. The terminal goal is to pinpoint the most appropriate medium to reach out to the target audience and thus convey messages efficiently.

== See also ==
- Social media marketing
- Marketing strategy
- Digital marketing
- Viral marketing
