= List of promotional campaigns by Coca-Cola =

This is a list of promotional activities by The Coca-Cola Company.

== List ==
- Ashita Ga Arusa
- Coke Zero Facial Profiler
- Coming Together
- Country Sunshine
- Diet Coke Break
- H_{2}NO
- Hey Kid, Catch!
- I'd Like to Teach the World to Sing
- The Lost Island of Alanna
- MagiCan
- Max Headroom
- Move to the Beat
- My Coke Rewards
- MyCoke
- Once Upon a Wheel
- Open Happiness
- Pepsi Invaders
- The Polar Bears
- Share a Coke

== See also ==
- List of Coca-Cola slogans
