= Front organization =

Surrogate organization answering to someone else

A front organization is any entity set up by and controlled by another organization that acts for the parent group without the actions being attributed to the parent group, thereby allowing them to hide certain activities from the authorities or the public.

== Intelligence agencies ==
The term was popularized by Senator Joe McCarthy, as he described various communist activities.

Intelligence agencies use front organizations to provide "cover", plausible occupations and means of income, for their covert agents. These may include legitimate organizations, such as charity, religious or journalism organizations; or "brass plate firms" which exist solely to provide a plausible background story, occupation, and means of income.

Brewster Jennings & Associates was a front company set up in 1994 by the Central Intelligence Agency (CIA) as a cover for its officers.

The airline Air America, an outgrowth of Civil Air Transport of the 1940s, and Southern Air Transport, ostensibly a civilian air charter company, were operated and wholly owned by the CIA, supposedly to provide humanitarian aid, but flew many combat support missions and supplied covert operations in Southeast Asia during the Vietnam War. Other CIA-funded front groups have been used to spread American propaganda and influence during the Cold War, particularly in the Third World. When intelligence agencies work through legitimate organizations, it can cause problems and increased risk for the workers of those organizations. To prevent this, the CIA has had a 20-year policy (since 1976, per US Government sources) of not using Peace Corps members or US journalists for intelligence purposes.

Another airline allegedly involved in intelligence operations was Russian Aeroflot that worked in a close coordination with KGB, SVR and GRU. The company conducted forcible "evacuations" of Soviet citizens from foreign countries back to the USSR. People whose loyalty was questioned were drugged and delivered unconscious by Aeroflot planes, assisted by the company KGB personnel, according to former GRU officer Victor Suvorov. In the 1980s and 1990s, specimens of deadly bacteria and viruses stolen from Western laboratories were delivered by Aeroflot to support the Russian program of biological weapons. This delivery channel encoded VOLNA ("wave") meant "delivering the material via an international flight of the Aeroflot airline in the pilots' cabin, where one of the pilots was a KGB officer". At least two SVR agents died, presumably from the transported pathogens.

When businessman Nikolai Glushkov was appointed as a top manager of Aeroflot in 1996, he found that the airline company worked as a "cash cow to support international spying operations" according to Alex Goldfarb: 3,000 people out of the total workforce of 14,000 in Aeroflot were FSB, SVR, or GRU officers. All proceeds from ticket sales were distributed to 352 foreign bank accounts that could not be controlled by the Aeroflot administration. Glushkov closed all these accounts and channeled the money to an accounting center called Andava in Switzerland. He also sent a bill and wrote a letter to SVR director Yevgeni Primakov and FSB director Mikhail Barsukov asking them to pay salaries of their intelligence officers in Aeroflot in 1996. Glushkov was imprisoned in 2000 on charges of illegally channeling money through Andava. Since 2004 the company is controlled by Viktor Ivanov, a high-ranking FSB official who is a close associate of Vladimir Putin.

== Law enforcement ==
The FBI has acknowledged using at least thirteen front companies to conceal their use of aircraft to observe criminal activity in the United States, including:

- KQM Aviation
- NBR Aviation
- NG Research
- PXW Services
- FVX Research

== Organized crime ==
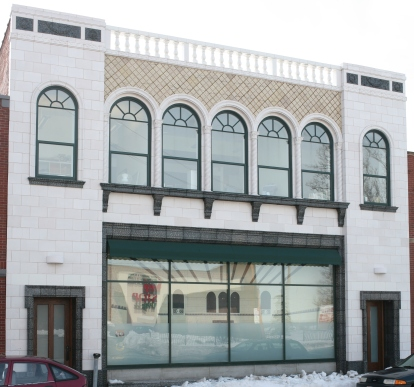
Front organizations often use facades of legitimate businesses to cover up illegal activity

Many organized crime operations have substantial legitimate businesses, such as licensed gambling houses, building construction companies, hair salons and karaoke bars, engineering firms, restaurants and bars, billiard clubs, trash hauling services, or dock loading enterprises. These front companies enable these criminal organizations to launder their income from illegal activities. As well, the front companies provide plausible cover for illegal activities such as illegal gambling, extortion, drug trafficking, smuggling, and prostitution. Tattoo parlors are often used as fronts for outlaw motorcycle clubs.

Where brothels are illegal, criminal organizations set up front companies providing services such as a "massage parlor" or "sauna" to the point that "massage parlor" or "sauna" is thought as a synonym of brothel in these countries.

=== Examples ===
A Colombian drug cartel, the Cali Cartel, in the past used Drogas La Rebaja, now a large national pharmacy store chain, as a front company in order to launder their drug trafficking earnings.

The General Manager of the Pharaoh's Gentlemen's Club in Cheektowaga, New York, was the international leader of the Outlaws Motorcycle Club: John Ermin. Many Outlaws MC members also work at the club. Authorities have referred to Pharaoh's as a hot spot for drug dealing and sex trafficking. The club's owner was Peter G. Gerace Jr., the nephew of reputed Buffalo crime family boss Joseph A. Todaro Jr. The Outlaws Motorcycle Club, themselves, have been designated by federal law enforcement as a criminal enterprise.

In the early 2000s, the Black Mafia Family established the Atlanta-based record label BMF Entertainment as a front company to launder funds that were generated from the sale of cocaine.

The boxing management company MTK Global is owned by the reputed Irish gang boss Daniel Kinahan. Heredia Boxing Management alleges that MTK Global was established as a front company to launder funds made from drug trafficking.

During the year of 2019, ACT Police shut down the Lakeside Tattoo Parlour in Belconnen on the grounds of it being allegedly used to launder cash for the notorious outlaw motorcycle gang, Comanchero Motorcycle Club. The money laundered through the tattoo parlor allegedly came from the club's drug trafficking operations.

== Religion ==
==== The Church of Jesus Christ of Latter-day Saints ====
Main article: 2023 Securities and Exchange Commission charges against the LDS Church and Ensign Peak Advisors

On February 21, 2023, the United States Securities and Exchange Commission (SEC) charged the Church of Jesus Christ of Latter-day Saints (LDS Church) and its non-profit investment arm, Ensign Peak Advisors (EP), for failing to disclose the LDS Church's investments, and instead creating shell companies whose purpose was to obscure the church's portfolio. The SEC further charged that the forms that were filed by the shell companies deliberately concealed the amount of control that EP had over investment decisions.

=== Scientology ===
The Church of Scientology uses front groups either to promote its interests in politics, to make its group seem more legitimate, and to recruit. The FBI's July 8, 1977 raids on the Church's offices (following discovery of the Church's Operation Snow White) turned up, among other documents, an undated memo entitled "PR General Categories of Data Needing Coding". This memo listed what it called "Secret PR Front Groups," which included the group APRL, "Alliance for the Preservation of Religious Liberty" (later renamed "Americans Preserving Religious Liberty"). The Cult Awareness Network (CAN) is considered by many to now be a front group for the Church of Scientology, which took the group over financially after bankrupting it in a series of lawsuits.

Time identified several other fronts for Scientology, including: the Citizens Commission on Human Rights (CCHR), The Way to Happiness Foundation, Applied Scholastics, the Concerned Businessmen's Association of America, and HealthMed Clinic. Seven years later the Boston Herald showed how Narconon and World Literacy Crusade were also fronts for Scientology. Other Scientology groups include Downtown Medical, Criminon and the Association for Better Living and Education (ABLE).

== Politics ==
=== Apartheid government fronts ===
South Africa's apartheid-era government used numerous front organizations to influence world opinion and to undertake extra-judicial activities and the killing of anti-apartheid activists; these included the following:

- The Citizen – funded secretly by the government and was intended to challenge the liberal Rand Daily Mail, contributing to the political ruin of John Vorster and Connie Mulder
- Civil Cooperation Bureau (CCB) – a covert, special forces organization that harassed, seriously injured, and eliminated anti-apartheid activists
- Federal Independent Democratic Alliance (FIDA) – a conservative black group.
- International Freedom Foundation – Washington-based mechanism to combat sanctions and support Jonas Savimbi and UNITA
- Jeugkrag – or Youth for South Africa, led by Marthinus van Schalkwyk as a short-lived Afrikaner youth group, surreptitiously funded by the Military Intelligence's Project Essay
- National Student Federation (NSF) – led by Russell Crystal, intended to challenge NUSAS
- Roodeplaat Research Laboratories – Led by Daan Goosen, the main research facility of Project Coast
- Taussig Familienstiftung, or Taussig Family Trust - a Liechtenstein conduit for secret government transactions
- Veterans for Victory – consisting of national servicemen, a countermeasure to the End Conscription Campaign, which was allied to the United Democratic Front (UDF)

=== Communist fronts ===
Communist parties (especially Marxist-Leninist ones) have sometimes used front organizations to attract support from those (sometimes called "fellow travellers") who do not fully agree with the party's ideology but agree with certain aspects of it. The front organization often obscures its provenance and may often be a tool for recruitment. Other Marxists often describe front organizations as opportunist. The concept of a front organization should be distinguished from the united front (a coalition of working class or socialist parties) and the popular front. Both the united front and the popular front usually disclose the groups that make up their coalitions.

==== United States ====
According to a list prepared in 1955 by the United States Senate Internal Security Subcommittee, the Comintern set up no less than 82 front organizations in the United States in the 1930s and the 1940s.

Soviet intelligence infiltrated many peace movements in the West. In addition to the World Peace Council, important communist front organizations included the World Federation of Trade Unions, the World Federation of Democratic Youth, and the International Union of Students. Richard Felix Staar has also suggested that these organizations were somewhat less important front organizations: Afro-Asian People's Solidarity Organisation, Christian Peace Conference, International Association of Democratic Lawyers, International Federation of Resistance Movements, International Institute for Peace, International Organization of Journalists, Women's International Democratic Federation, and World Federation of Scientific Workers. There were also numerous smaller organizations, affiliated with the above fronts such as Pugwash Conferences on Science and World Affairs. Numerous peace conferences, congresses and festivals have been staged with support of those organizations.

More recently, the Workers' World Party (WWP) set up an anti-war front group, International ANSWER. (ANSWER is no longer closely associated with WWP; it is closely associated with a WWP splinter, the Party for Socialism and Liberation, but PSL plays a more open role in the organization.) Similarly, Unite Against Fascism, the Anti-Nazi League, the Stop the War Coalition and Respect – The Unity Coalition are all criticised as being fronts for the Trotskyist Socialist Workers Party (UK).

==== Russia ====
In April 1991, the Communist Party of the Soviet Union leadership and the KGB created a puppet political party in Russia, the Liberal Democratic Party of the Soviet Union (LDPSU), which became the second officially-registered party in the country. According to KGB General Philipp Bobkov, it was a "Zubatov's pseudo-party under KGB control that directs interests and sentiments of certain social groups". The former Soviet Politburo member Alexander Nikolaevich Yakovlev described in his book how KGB Director Vladimir Kryuchkov presented the project of the puppet party at a joint meeting with Mikhail Gorbachev and informed him about a selection of party leaders and the mechanism of funding from Communist Party money. The book includes an official copy of a document providing the initial Liberal Democratic Party funding (3 million rubles) from the Communist Party's money. The Liberal Democratic leader, Vladimir Zhirinovsky, proved to be an effective media performer and gained 8% of votes during the 1991 presidential elections. He also supported the August 1991 coup attempt.

==== China ====
The united front is a political strategy and network of groups and key individuals that are influenced or controlled by the Chinese Communist Party (CCP) and used to advance its interests. It has traditionally been a popular front that has included eight legally permitted political parties: the Chinese People's Political Consultative Conference (CPPCC), the All-China Federation of Industry and Commerce, the China Council for the Promotion of International Trade, the All-China Federation of Returned Overseas Chinese, and other people's organizations. Under Chinese Communist Party General Secretary Xi Jinping, the united front and its targets of influence have expanded in size and scope. The united front is managed primarily by but is not limited to the United Front Work Department (UFWD).

==== Other ====
An anti-Islamist feminist group in the Muslim world has also been accused of being a front organization. The Organization of Women's Freedom in Iraq has been accused of being a front for the Worker-Communist Party of Iraq.

=== Other ===
==== United States ====
Historian Matthew Dallek writes that the John Birch Society's (JBS) pioneering use of front organizations starting in the late 1950s helped spread far-right issues outside of the JBS and into broader public discourse and that it "became a template for conservative advocacy for decades to come."

In 2014, Andrew Cuomo established a front political party, the Women's Equality Party. The party was established to take advantage of electoral fusion laws in New York State that allow candidates to run on multiple ballot lines and to count all of their votes together. Critics of the party and of Cuomo have noted that there is an inherent level of deception involved in the party, as Cuomo is not a woman, the party has not favored women in its endorsement policies, and Cuomo's gubernatorial campaign fund is the primary source of revenue for the party's operations.

== Banned paramilitary organizations ==
Both Loyalist and Republican paramilitaries in Ireland during the Troubles used cover names when they carried out sectarian attacks against civilians. Republican groups like the Provisional IRA and the Irish National Liberation Army used front names like the South Armagh Republican Action Force, Catholic Reaction Force and the People's Republican Army to claim responsibility for attacks on civilians,

During the Weimar Republic in Germany, the anti-Semitic and nationalist Organisation Consul reportedly had a front company named the Bavarian Wood Products Company.

== Corporate front organizations ==
Over the past 15 years, increasing concerns about obesity have caused Coca-Cola to experience pressure from social movement activists to reduce the sugar content in its drinks. Although Coca-Cola has publicly promoted consumer engagement in healthy lifestyles with its campaigns such as 'Coming Together', activists have also exposed that Coca-Cola has secretly funded front groups or organizations that criticize social movement activists and legitimize controversial corporate activities. The Center for Consumer Freedom (CCF) and Global Energy Balance Network (GEBN) are two main groups that engage activists on behalf of Coca-Cola even though they were not intended to be publicly associated with Coca-Cola as a corporation. Research has revealed that the CCF, with a mission to "promote responsibility and protect consumer choices", uses both verbal and visual strategies to articulate obesity as "personal responsibility" to protect the industry from corporate responsibility.

Tobacco companies frequently use front organizations and doctors to advocate their arguments about tobacco use although less openly and obviously than in the 1980s. The World Health Organization has charged that the tobacco industry funded seemingly-unbiased scientific organizations to undermine tobacco control measures and cited the International Life Sciences Institute in particular. Another way to combat public health measures against tobacco is to use lobbying and campaign contributions. For example, RJ Reynolds, the current second-largest tobacco company in the United States, created a front group named Get Government Off Our Back ("GGOOB") in 1994 to fight federal regulation of tobacco. By hiding its involvement with tobacco industry, GGOOB avoided the tobacco industry reputation for misrepresenting evidence and drew big supports from both public and legislative aspects, successfully resolving the threats from wide-reaching tobacco regulations.

A list of some alleged corporate front groups active in the US is maintained by the Multinational Monitor. Some think tanks are corporate front groups. These organizations present themselves as research organizations, using phrases such as "...Institute for Research" in their names. Because their names suggest neutrality, they can present the commercial strategies of the corporations which sponsor them in a way which appears to be objective sociological or economical research rather than political lobbying.

Similarly the Center for Regulatory Effectiveness has been criticised as a front organization for various industry bodies which seek to undermine regulation of their environmentally damaging activities under the guise of 'regulatory effectiveness'.

=== Astroturfing ===
Astroturfing, a wordplay based on "grassroots" efforts, is an American term used pejoratively to describe formal public relations projects which try to create the impression of a groundswell of spontaneous popular response to a politician, product, service, or event. Corporations have been known to "astroturf", but are not the only entities alleged to have done so. In recent years, organizations of plaintiffs' attorneys have established front groups such as Victims and Families United to oppose tort reform.

== See also ==
- Astroturfing
- Covert operation
- Dummy corporation
- Money laundering
- Racket
- Shell company
- Terrorist front organization
