= Can't Beat the Feeling =

Can't Beat the Feeling may refer to:

- "Can't beat the feeling!", a Coca-Cola slogan used in 1989
- "Coca-Cola - Can't Beat the Feeling", 2002 song by Tatana Sterba
- "Can't Beat the Feeling", song by Kylie Minogue from Aphrodite

== See also ==
- Napalm (Can't Beat That Feeling), a 2004 Banksy artwork
