= David Kracov =

American painter

David Kracov (born 1968) is an American painter, animator and sculptor. He is known for his metal wall sculptures and Looney Tunes shadow boxes.

== Life and art ==
Kracov was born in 1968 in Boston, Massachusetts. At the age of 12, after winning first place in an art competition, he became one of the youngest artists ever to be showcased in the Boston Museum of Fine Arts. After receiving a degree from the Rhode Island School of Design, Kracov moved to Los Angeles in order to pursue a career in animation.

=== Los Angeles Years - Animation ===
David began as an animator on Ralph Bakshi's Cool World (1992), where he quickly became Head of Special Effects. After production ended, David went on to work with Disney Animation, Don Bluth Animation, Rich Animation, as well as other renown studios, working on such features as Troll in Central Park, The Swan Princess, and more. During this time, David also worked for famous Special Effects studios, creating visual effects for successful feature films.

=== Sculpting - Clay ===
During his time as an animator, having no formal training in sculpture, David began to experiment with different types of clay, and started sculpting the characters from those films he animated. He was then approached by Warner Bros. Studios, and commissioned to create a limited edition chess set, titled "Looney Trails", for the Warner Bros. Studio Galleries. All 50 sets, which required over seven months to complete, sold out within two days of their release. Following his initial success, Kracov continued working with the Warner Bros. studios, becoming the exclusive licensed sculptor for all Warner Bros. characters. During that time David was contacted by Disney Studios to create sculptures of individual characters as well as chess sets for their stores, galleries, and theme parks.

=== Steel and Metal ===
Kracov started experimenting with steel, using a technique previously pioneered by fellow Israeli artist Dudu (David) Gerstein. Like Gerstein, Kracov created steel wall sculptures, all hand-cut from a single sheet of steel and painted using a vibrant color palette. Kracov also experimented with paper cutting, tracing back to ancient far-east techniques known to be extremely delicate and accurate.

As a tribute to Pavel Friedmann's poem 'The Butterfly', David includes at least one butterfly in most of the sculptures he creates. Kracov was commissioned by The Coca-Cola Company to create a butterfly-themed metal wall-sculpture titled "Open Happiness", for the company's 125th Anniversary. He now has 2 sculptures exhibited in the Coca-Cola museum in Atlanta and at the entrance of the Coca-Cola headquarters in France.

=== Present ===
Over the years Kracov has gained notable success and followers; his art is present in exclusive galleries all over the world, particularly in Asia, Europe and North America, and displayed in many central locations and luxury hotels, such as the Plaza Athenee in Paris. Kracov is also very popular among famous private art collectors around the world. His works can be found in the personal collections of renowned businessmen as well as Hollywood entertainers such as Steven Spielberg, Matt Damon, Liev Schreiber, Whoopi Goldberg, and Michael Douglas who gave the Book of Life sculpture to his father Kirk Douglas as a gift.

== Series ==
=== Metal Sculptures ===
Unique steel sculptures, hand-cut from a single sheet of steel, painted in vibrant colors.

Books - Stunning book shaped metal sculptures, with different visual elements that emerge from the pages.

Significant works:

"THE BOOK OF LIFE" - A tribute to Rabbi Yossi Raichik, director of Charbad's Children of Chernobyl organization. Represents 2547 children that escaped Chernobyl's nuclear disaster

"THE BOOK OF LOVE" - An expression of love of the written word and an homage to those who are able to transform words into worlds

"NOTEBOOK" - Musical notes that projects themselves from an open book.

Hearts - Heart shaped metal sculptures in spectacular colors.

Significant works:

"LITTLE LOVE IN MY HEART" - The works captures the many shapes of love that can be felt in one's heart

"EVERY STROKE COUNTS" - This work demonstrates the many elements that assemble one's heart, where the whole is made up by many, equally important strokes of colores.

"LOOK WITHIN YOUR HEART" - This work invited the observer to face his or her emotions and try and connect to the feelings inside.

3d Wall Sculptures - Beautiful wall-mounted metal sculptures in vivid colors.

Significant works:

- "MY HEART IS ALL A FLUTTER"
- "LOOK WITHIN YOUR HEART"
- "TAKE ANOTHER PIECE OF MY HEART"

Waves - Vibrant metal sculptures of different colorful elements shaped in the form of a wave.

Significant works:

- "GO WITH THE FLOW"
- "PASSING WITH FLYING COLORS"
- "LOVE IS IN THE AIR"

Boxes

Significant works:

- "THINKING OUTSIDE THE BOX"
- "SENDING MY LOVE"
- "GIFT OF LIFE"

Thinking Outside The Box (Metal)

Significant works:

- "HARING"
- "POLLOCK"
- "CONDUCTOR"

Lips - Lips shaped metal sculptures in vivid colors.

Significant works:

- "BLOSSOMING ROMANCE"
- "LOLLIPOP"
- "MELTS IN YOUR MOUTH"

Homage - A series of metal sculptures that pays homage to famous artists and cultural icons.

Significant work:

- "HOMMAGE TO JACKSON POLLOCK"

New York/Megalopolice - A series of beautiful metal sculptures that pays homage to NY city and metropolitan cities in general.

Significant works:

- "BIG APPLE"
- "REFLECTIONS"

=== Papercuts ===
Framed paper-cut sculptures in vibrant colors.

Significant works:

- "LOVE FLUTTER BY"
- "FOLLOW YOUR HEART"
- "POP ART"

=== Shadowbox ===
One of Kracov's most familiar works - an exclusive limited edition series of clever out of the box sculptures, made of hand-painted crushed marble, with layers of color reproduction backgrounds, signed by the artist.

Significant works:

- "I CLAIM THIS PLANET"
- "DUCK TAPE"
- "ELMER'S GLUE"

In addition to his series, Kracov had also released some monochrome versions of his works, such as:

- "MY HEART IS ALL A FLUTTER"
- "HOMAGE TO JACKSON POLLOCK"

== Exhibitions ==
Year	City
2015	Paris, Monaco, St. Tropez, NYC.
2014	New York, Lyon, Berlin, Paris, Geneva, Forte Dei Marmi, Singapore, Kuala Lumpur, Saint Tropez, Hamburg, Palma de Mallorca, San Francisco, Verbier, Munich, Jerusalem, Tel Aviv, Istanbul, Nuenen, Bordeaux, Hertfordshire.
2013	Geneva, Lyon, New York, Singapore, Konstanz, Düsseldorf, Forte Dei Marmi, Paris, San Francisco, Berlin, Jerusalem, Bordeaux, Istanbul, Nuenen, Saint Tropez, Verbier.
2012	San Francisco, Düsseldorf, Lyon, Geneva, Marseille, Saint Tropez, Berlin, Hamm, Tel Aviv, New York
2011	Geneva, Saint Tropez, Lyon, Tel Aviv, New York, Jerusalem, Paris, Marseille, Cran Montana.
2010	New Delhi, Marseille, Geneva, Lyon, Tel Aviv, Jerusalem, Chicago, Paris, New York, Saint Remy de Provence, Saint Tropez, Crans Montana.
2009	Lyon, Saint Tropez, Marseille, Geneva, Tel Aviv, Jerusalem, New Delhi, Chicago, Paris, New York, Saint Remy de Provence.
2008	Paris, Geneva, Lyon, Tel Aviv, Saint Tropez, Chicago, Marseille, New York, Jerusalem.
2007	Saint Tropez, Lyon, Chicago, New York, Saint Remy de Provence, Geneva, Jerusalem, Tel Aviv.
2006	New York, Tel Aviv, Paris, Lyon, Geneva, New Delhi.
