= Debranding =

Marketing strategy

Swoosh, the logo of Nike Inc., an example of a debranded logo

Debranding is a marketing strategy to remove the manufacturers name from a product to appear less corporate, or to save on advertising. De-corporatizing is when a company removes its name from its logo for a marketing campaign in an attempt to make themselves appear less corporate and more personal. "Transitioning into generic" is when a company with a well-known brand opts to appear more generic. This means the company will eliminate advertising and reduce prices and debranding in this sense can increase profit margins.

== History ==
=== De-corporatizing ===
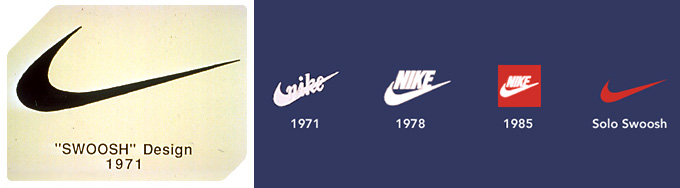
This image shows the development of the first ever company to successfully debrand.

Nike has been called the first company to debrand their logo, which happened in 1995. In 2011, this trend continued when Starbucks opted to remove its name from the logo leaving only the center image. The intention was to make Starbucks appear more like a local coffee shop and less corporate. Two years later, Coca-Cola debuted Share a Coke. This promotion saw Coca-Cola replace its logo with 150 given names.

=== Transitioning into generic ===
In the early 1980s American consumers began transitioning from so-called “name” brands towards more affordable generic, or “no-name,” brands. This shift occurred across a range of household products. In a short amount of time generic brands captured 2% of supermarket sales in the US. In 1981 generic brands commonly held 4–10% of the product category sales in which they were strongest, in some cases reaching as high as 16%. What puzzled many was that generic brands were capturing market share without the benefits of major distribution afforded to the name brands. This increase in market share of generic brands also came at a time when overall sales were decreasing slightly. With no signs of slowing, generic brands posed a significant threat to the profitability of major brands.

== Psychological reasons ==
=== De-corporatizing ===
The intention behind debranding is often to make the company appear less corporate and therefore more personal and “forward thinking”.

=== Transitioning into "generic" ===
Many large corporations assumed generics were a fad, targeted at the low-end, price-conscious consumer. Research proved quite the opposite. Consumer satisfaction for generics was very high; 93% of those who purchased generics were satisfied with the product and 86% were interested in continuing to purchase generics. Furthermore, evidence suggested consumers viewed the quality of generics to be at least as good as those of private brands. This presented a huge issue for branded products: consumers of all types, including the highly educated and upscale, were not necessarily concerned about the price of the product, but rather the perceived value. If a product is produced by Brand X, but there is a generic available, the consumer will tend toward the generic since the perceived quality is similar, but the price is generally lower. This means consumers were no longer responding to, or willing to pay for, the extensive branding and advertising campaigns contained in the price of the branded product.

Brands with marginal or weak sales were at the highest risk of losing customers. Retailers, ever conscious of optimizing shelf space, depended on quarterly reports to review sales data and either reduce or remove weak or even marginal brands to make room for more profitable products. However, a new technology would revolutionize the way retailers collected this data: the universal product code (UPC).

The UPC symbol, also known as a barcode, introduced a great deal of automation into the retail market. With automation also came the ability for retail managers to review sales data on a daily basis instead of having to wait for quarterly reports. This meant retailers could view near real-time the trends of their consumers and which marginal or weak brands could be replaced by much more profitable products. Data at the time suggested that generics had a much greater stock turn than branded products i.e. their sales to inventory ratio. With this powerful new technology and data, retailers quickly began dumping weak and marginal brands in favor of the much more profitable and in-demand generics.

== Modern Debranding ==
In the 1980s and 90s, consumers were more concerned about value. Today’s consumer is more conscious of what they are purchasing and more cautious of large corporations, favoring local, small, independent stores. As such, the type of debranding popular in the 1980s and 90s has backfired for corporations in the 2000s.

In many ways Starbucks is a perfect example of modern debranding because they strive to balance their brand identity and a local identity. Starbucks removed the name and left only the siren logo on signs and merchandise to appear less corporate and appeal to modern consumers. Starbucks has also responded to the recent popularity of shopping local by acquiring trusted local businesses. The shops retained their local names and flavors rather than becoming a Starbucks coffee shop.

Another manifestation of modern debranding is the wordless logo: multinational companies have begun dropping their names from their logos, leaving only the symbols. It is psychologically easier to relate to a visual than it is to a name, meaning that consumers form stronger relationships with brands they might otherwise be critical of.
