= H2NO =

Campaign by Coca-Cola

H_{2}NO was an upselling campaign by The Coca-Cola Company to dissuade consumers from ordering tap water drinks at restaurants, and to instead order more profitable soft drinks, non-carbonated beverages, or bottled water. The campaign's title, H_{2}NO, reflects the program's purpose, which is to have customers say No to H_{2}O, the chemical formula for water. The program taught waiters how to use "suggestive selling techniques" to offer a variety of alternative beverages when diners asked for water.

In July 2001, a link to a story about the program's success at Olive Garden was posted to Cockeyed.com. The link was reposted around the internet, until the story was taken down by Coca-Cola on August 2, 2001, for fears it might be misinterpreted. On August 20, 2001, the story was covered by The New York Times, and subsequently by a number of news providers.

The campaign ran only in the United States.

== Discovery and Coca-Cola response ==
The H_{2}NO campaign had been conducted through an Internet memo to distributors and restaurants. In July 2001, Rob Cockerham, a graphic designer in Sacramento, came across the Olive Garden success story following an online search, and posted a link to the story on his website, Cockeyed.com. In an interview with The New York Times, Cockerham noted how "I had to assure more than one person that this was not a prank, and that it was a real article from Coca-Cola."

On August 2, 2001, about a week after the success story link was posted to Cockeyed.com, the Coca-Cola portal was closed. Polly Howes, a spokeswoman for Coca-Cola, stated that the story might be misinterpreted by "folks who aren't in a sales-related business" and that the site was due to be dismantled.

Following the New York Times article, the story was covered by major news providers, including Sunday Herald Sun, Evening Standard and was featured on The Glass House.

== Olive Garden success story ==
H_{2}NO is a crew education kit containing information about beverage suggestive selling techniques (a technique used when a server suggests a profitable beverage in place of water to the customer during the ordering process). It matched perfectly with what Olive Garden had envisioned. Restaurant managers and servers use the kit to emphasize the wide range of beverage selections available, including soft drinks, non-carbonated beverages and alcohol. As a side effect, overall check averages should increase, and remember, increased check averages mean higher profits for the restaurant and more cash in servers' pockets.

— Website of The Coca-Cola Company, as of August 1, 2001

In a success story on Coca-Cola's online public relations portal, entitled "The Olive Targets Tap Water & WINS", Coca-Cola described the purpose, implementation, and success in reducing "tap water incidence".

Coca-Cola stated that customers chose tap water out of habit, and that selling alternative beverages would increase guest satisfaction:

Water. It's necessary to sustain life, but to many Casual Dining restaurant chains it contributes to a dull dining experience for the customer. Many customers choose tap water not because they enjoy it, but because it is what they always have drunk in the past. In response, some restaurant chains are implementing programs to help train crews to sell alternative choices to tap water, like soft drinks and non-carbonated beverages, with the goal of increasing overall guest satisfaction.

Olive Garden's stated goal was "to influence customers to abandon their default choice of tap water and experience other beverage choices to improve their dining experience".

According to reports in the US, the first shots in the war against water were fired in Olive Garden restaurants.

— "Coke says no to H_{2}O", Sunday Herald Sun (2001)

The Olive Garden suffered from a "high water incidence rate" and "wanted their restaurant crews to emphasize the broad array of alternative beverage selections available" so as "to influence customers to abandon their default choice of tap water and experience other beverage choices to improve their dining experience." In response, the Coca-Cola USA-Fountain offered the tap water reduction program H_{2}NO. The H_{2}NO program featured "beverage suggestive selling techniques (a technique used when a server suggests a profitable beverage in place of water to the customer during the ordering process)." Alternative beverages including soft drinks, non-carbonated beverages and alcohol would be offered which would lead to higher "overall check averages" and greater profits. To further improve the effectiveness of the program, the "Olive Garden developed an employee incentive contest linked to H_{2}NO with CCUSA-Fountain called 'Just Say No to H_{2}O.'"

The success story noted how "because of its own successful campaign against water, The Olive Garden has recently sent a powerful message to the entire restaurant industry - less water and more beverage choices mean happier customers" stating how:

When the contest was completed, almost all participating restaurants realized significant increases in beverage sales and reduced levels of tap water incidence - a strong indication that Olive Garden restaurants succeeded in enhancing the customer's dining experience. And perhaps most importantly, Olive Garden expects to see this trend continue as the skills learned become part of the crew's everyday interaction with restaurant customers.

== Criticism ==
In this age of branding, even plain old milk needs a big ad campaign and celebrity endorsements. But another popular beverage, tap water, has no such support -- a tactical misstep that has left it vulnerable to aggressive competitors like the Coca-Cola Company.

— "'Just Say No to H2O' (Unless It's Coke's Own Brew)", The New York Times (2001)

The program and Olive Garden success story were widely ridiculed.

On August 22, 2001, Peter Gleick, the director of the Pacific Institute, wrote a letter to the editor of The New York Times, criticizing the campaign, noting how "both PepsiCo and Coca-Cola use perfectly potable tap water as the source of their bottled waters, Aquafina and Dasani. I guess tap water is O.K., if we can be made to pay for it."

In a report by Corporate Accountability International, Tapping Congress to Get Off the Bottle, the report criticized the campaign as part of how "bottlers have employed a range of marketing tactics that have overtly disparaged the tap." The Olive Garden success story and the H2NO program have been cited in literature as examples of the bottled water industry's aggressive advertising campaigns which views tap water as an impediment to increased profits.

== See also ==
- List of promotional campaigns by Coca-Cola
- Nestlé boycott (targeting that company's promotion of breast milk substitutes)
