= Don't even think about it! =

Prohibition

"Don't even think about it!" is an emphatic prohibition popularized by a Pepsi commercial from 1993 in which thirsty Shaquille O'Neal is denied Pepsi by a young fan who refuses to share with the famous basketball player.

== History ==
A "Don't even THINK of parking here" sign in New York City

The catchphrase as used by the Pepsi ad was based upon a similar phrase, "Don't even THINK of parking here", which came into use on no parking signs in major cities such as New York City and Chicago. The signs first appeared in New York in 1982 during Ed Koch's mayoral administration.

== Popularization ==
The 1993 commercial featuring O'Neal begins with him playing hoops at a street basketball court. A little kid notices him, and exclaims O'Neal's nickname, "Shaq". O'Neal, noticing that the kid has a Pepsi in his hand, walks over and says "Hey, can I have it?" He bends over, supposing that his admirer will give him the soda, but the kid refuses, saying: "Don't even think about it!" Suddenly, a sound simulating that of a scratched record is heard, and the commercial ends with the Pepsi logo and slogan.

The commercial is actually a parody of another famous one from the 1970s produced by Pepsi's rival, Coca-Cola, in which a young boy meets football player "Mean" Joe Greene as he is leaving the field after a game. The boy gives his hero a bottle of Coke and, in exchange for the drink, the football player throws his jersey to the boy, who excitedly catches the souvenir.

In a Rocko's Modern Life episode, Rocko got a traffic ticket for literally thinking of parking.

The sign is mentioned in an episode of Arthur in the backdoor pilot for Postcards from Buster.

== See also ==
- Parking violation
- Thought crime
