= Hey Kid, Catch! =

American television commercial

- Agency: McCann Erickson
- Client: The Coca-Cola Company
- Language: English
- Running time: 1 minute
- Product: Coca-Cola
- Release date: October 1, 1979
- Written by: Penny Hawkey
- Directed by: N. Lee Lacy
- Music by: "Coke and a Smile"
- Starring: "Mean" Joe Greene Tommy Okon
- Production company: N. Lee Lacy/ Associates
- Country: United States

"Hey Kid, Catch!" is an American television commercial for Coca-Cola starring Pittsburgh Steelers player "Mean" Joe Greene. The commercial debuted on October 1, 1979, and was re-aired multiple times, most notably during Super Bowl XIV in 1980. The 60-second commercial won a Clio Award for being one of the best television commercials of 1979. The commercial was a part of Coca-Cola's "Have a Coke and a Smile" ad campaign of the late 1970s.

== The commercial ==
After sustaining an injury during a football game, Greene is limping alone into the tunnel toward the Steelers' locker room when a young boy (played by Tommy Okon) comes up behind him offering his help, which Greene declines. After telling Greene that he still thinks he is the best, the boy offers him his bottle of Coke; Greene sheepishly accepts it with thanks and drinks the entire bottle as the boy quietly says "See ya 'round" and slowly walks away. When Greene finishes the Coke he turns back to the boy and says "Hey, kid... catch," tossing his jersey (slung over his shoulder) to the surprised boy who happily says "Wow! Thanks, Mean Joe!" Greene casts a smile toward the boy before continuing his trek to the locker room.

=== Production notes and accolades ===
The campaign's director was N. Lee Lacy, the art director was Roger Mosconi, the writer was Penny Hawkey, and the singers of the "Coke and a Smile" jingle were Jim Campbell, Don Thomas, Liz Corrigan, Shellie Littman, Arlene Martell, and Linda November. The footage was shot in May 1979 at a small stadium in Mount Vernon, New York, and the commercial first aired on October 1, 1979, on ABC's Monday Night Football (the Green Bay Packers hosted the New England Patriots in that night's game, the first MNF broadcast from Lambeau Field), though its airing during Super Bowl XIV in 1980 brought it the most attention due to the program's enormous audience. Coincidentally, the Steelers played in Super Bowl XIV, defeating the Los Angeles Rams 31–19.

The commercial has been listed as one of the top ads of all time by multiple sources, including TV Guide. The ad later received worldwide acclaim when it was re-filmed in various countries using local sports figures such as Diego Maradona, Niwat Srisawat and Zico.

Greene later recalled that in filming the commercial, it took several takes to get his final line in the commercial in without burping. "Between me belching and going to the men's room, it took three days to film it," Greene recalled. The end of the commercial was also shown during the 2004 film Miracle when the USA vs. USSR hockey game was on a commercial break.

In 2016 Joe reunited with Tommy Okon during a two-hour CBS special filmed at Apogee Stadium in Denton, Texas honoring Super Bowl's Greatest Commercials. Greene speaking with Okon almost 40 years since the original filming said to Okon “It’s great to see you. My God, look at you. I don’t need to look down here anymore!”

== Film adaptation ==
A made-for-TV movie titled The Steeler and the Pittsburgh Kid, loosely based on the commercial and starring Greene and Henry Thomas instead of Tommy Okon as the kid, aired on NBC on November 15, 1981, as part of the network's Project Peacock series which featured family-based specials and programming. In the film, the team temporarily adopts a 9-year-old boy where Greene takes on a fatherly role as he teaches the boy some valuable lessons.

== Parodies and homages ==
- In 1981, a Sesame Street segment featured Roscoe Orman (Gordon) as football player Big Murray, giving a young fan a towel bearing the number seven, as a way to show the number seven as the number of the day.
- In 1983, the television show Newhart paid homage to the commercial in the first-season episode "A View from the Bench" when a limping Celtics player throws his basketball shoes to Bob Newhart on his way to the locker room.
- In 1993, Coca-Cola's longtime rival Pepsi did their own modern spoof of the commercial. After finding an empty courtside cooler, Shaquille O'Neal sees a young admirer for his soda only to be rebuffed by saying "Don't even think about it!".
- In 1994, The Simpsons episode "Bart Gets Famous" features Krusty yelling "Hey Kid!" as he throws his towel to Bart.
- In 1999, a Family Guy episode "Peter, Peter, Caviar Eater" features a cutaway gag with Mean Joe tossing all of his clothes to Peter. He makes another appearance in the 2008 episode "Road to Germany," tossing a container of uranium to Stewie.
- A 2001 Pepsi ad with David Beckham closely follows the original plot until the boy wipes the rim of the can Beckham had borrowed with the shirt he had gifted.
- In 2001, as part of Cartoon Network's annual marathon called The Big Game XXIV: Bugs vs. Daffy, a parody of this commercial features Johnny Bravo & Morocco Mole from Secret Squirrel. In this commercial, Bravo confuses Mole for being a dog.
- The ending of the Futurama episode from 2002 called "A Leela of Her Own" (the episode title is a parody of the 1992 film A League of Their Own) parodies this, with Leela, as a blernsball (a futuristic version of baseball) pitcher, throwing her jockstrap, unsuccessfully, to professional blernsball player, Jackie Anderson.
- In the 2003 episode "Some Assembly Required" of the television show Frasier, the character Niles gives a child a handkerchief in a similar manner after a good performance at an elementary-school assembly about the importance of cleanliness.
- During Super Bowl XLIII in 2009, Coca-Cola aired a parody to the ad to promote its Coca-Cola Zero brand, starring then-current Steelers player Troy Polamalu in Greene's role. Continuing an ongoing theme in promotion for the beverage, the ad is interrupted by Coca-Cola "brand managers" who accuse Polamalu of "stealing" their commercial, prompting the safety to tackle one of them and give the child their shirt. Much like the original commercial airing during Super Bowl XIV, Super Bowl XLIII also featured the Steelers, who defeated the Arizona Cardinals 27–23 for their record sixth Vince Lombardi Trophy.
- In January 2011, an episode of SportsNation on ESPN2 briefly parodied this commercial which featured sportscaster Michelle Beadle in Greene's role. In the commercial, after finishing the soda, instead of the jersey, she "accidentally" throws the empty soda bottle back to the kid as it breaks on the wall at the end and then apologizes after that "mishap". In addition, the commercial tried to look like the late 1970s/early 1980s font titles with the words "Facebook.com/SportsNation" and "Have Some "SportsNation" and a smile" and "Sports is Life".
- In February 2011, an advertisement for the Fox television drama series House, first aired during Super Bowl XLV, parodies the original commercial with a similar scene in which Dr. Gregory House, played by Hugh Laurie, throws his cane to a young fan played by Preston Bailey.
- In 2012, Greene reprised his role in a Downy Unstopables ad for Super Bowl XLVI entitled "Stinky", where Amy Sedaris rejects Greene's jersey because it smelled.
- In January 2016, forward-center for the Sacramento Kings DeMarcus Cousins did a recreation of the classic commercial in order to promote the 2016 All-Star Voting process.
- In February 2016, Pennsylvania politician John Fetterman recreated the commercial for a campaign ad during his Senate campaign.

== See also ==
- List of Coca-Cola slogans
