= Olive Garden =

American restaurant chain

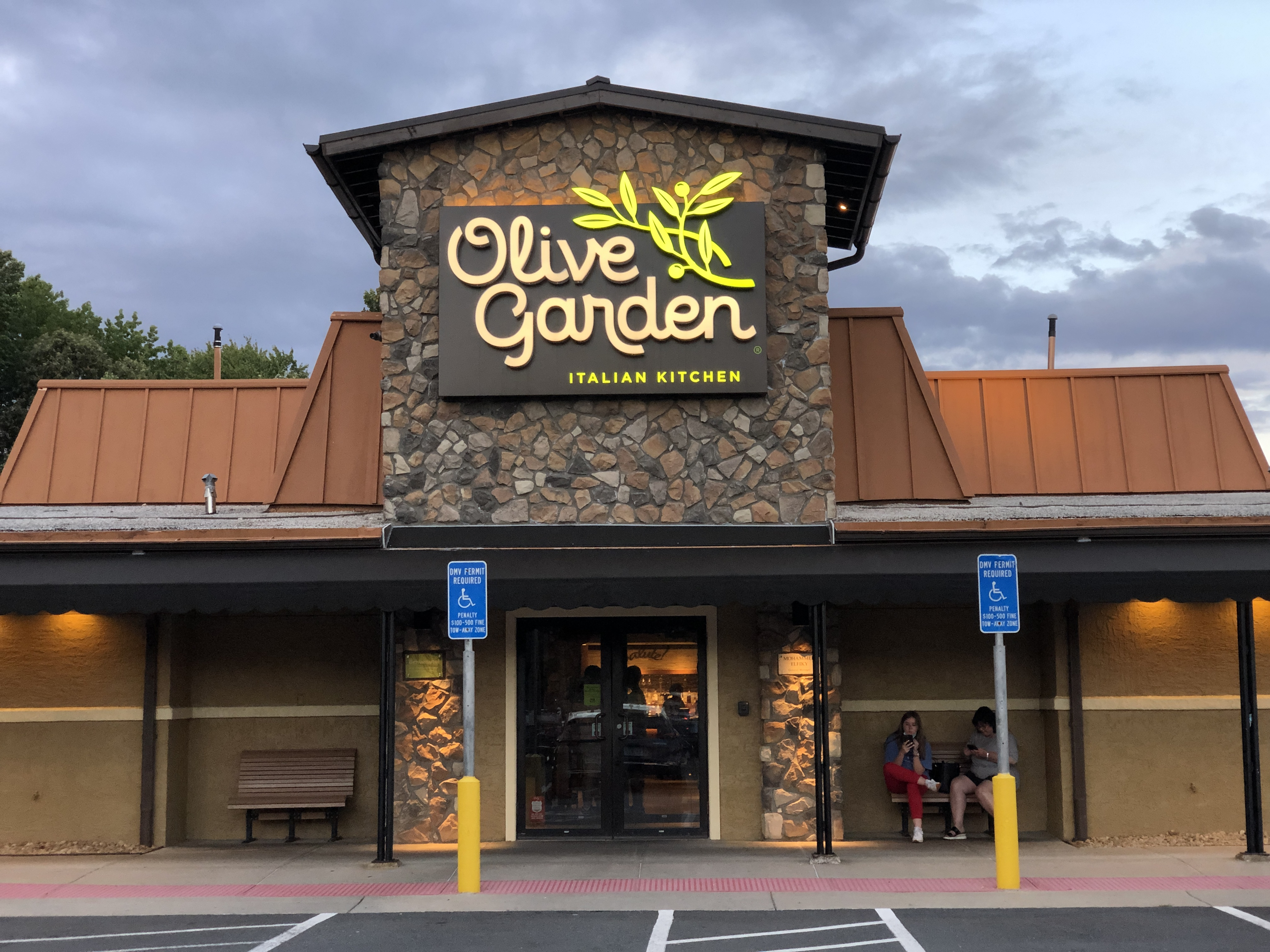
- Olive Garden in Fair Lakes, Virginia
- Trade name: Olive Garden
- Formerly: The Olive Garden (1982–1998)
- Type: Division
- Industry: Restaurant
- Genre: Casual dining
- Founded: December 13, 1982; 43 years ago in Orlando, Florida, U.S.
- Founders: Blaine Sweatt; Mark Given; Gino DeSantis; Dave Manuchia
- Headquarters: 1000 Darden Center Drive; Orlando, Florida, United States; 32837
- Number of locations: 900+
- Area served: United States; Puerto Rico; Guam; Aruba; Brazil; Canada; Costa Rica; Ecuador; El Salvador; Mexico; Panama; Philippines; Saudi Arabia; India; Spain
- Key people: Dan Kiernan (president)
- Products: Italian-American cuisine
- Parent: General Mills (1982–1995); Darden Restaurants (1995–present)
- Website: olivegarden.com

Darden Concepts, Inc., doing business as Olive Garden, is an American casual dining restaurant chain specializing in Italian-American cuisine. It is a unit of Darden Restaurants, Inc., which is headquartered in Orange County, Florida. As of 2022, Olive Garden restaurants accounted for $4.5 billion of the $9.63 billion revenue of Darden.

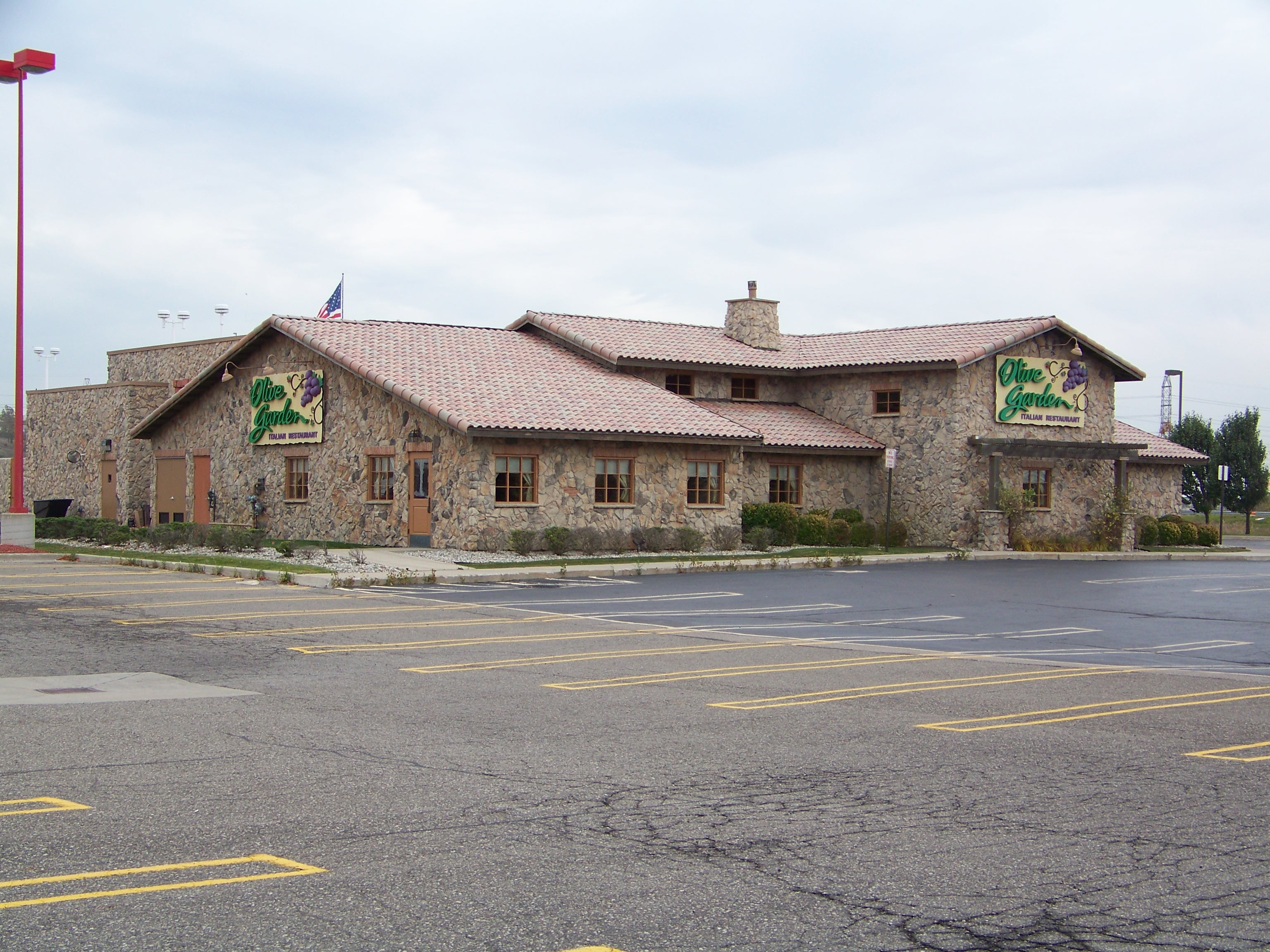
An Olive Garden restaurant in Auburn Hills, Michigan. Example of location with old logo.

== History ==
The Olive Garden started as a unit of General Mills. The Olive Garden's first restaurant was opened on December 13, 1982, in Orlando, Florida, by co-founders Blaine Sweatt, Mark Given, Gino DeSantis and Dave Manuchia. By 1989, there were 145 The Olive Garden restaurants, making it the fastest-growing units in the General Mills restaurant division. The Olive Garden restaurants were uniformly popular, and the chain's per-store sales soon matched former sister company Red Lobster. The company eventually became the largest chain of Italian-themed full-service restaurants in the United States.

General Mills spun off its restaurant holdings as Darden Restaurants (named after Red Lobster founder Bill Darden), a stand-alone company, in 1995. Olive Garden removed "The" from its name in 1998 as part of a rebranding which introduced the slogan "When you're here, you're family". In 2009, Olive Garden was Darden's most inexpensive restaurant chain with an average check per person of $15.00 (USD) versus over $90 at its sibling Capital Grille.

Brad Blum, a former president of Olive Garden, said that sales in existing restaurants sharply decreased, with a 12% decline occurring at one point, even though the company was quickly establishing new restaurants. Sandra Pedicini of the Orlando Sentinel said that "Darden reinvented the Olive Garden in the 1990s, from a floundering chain into an industry star".

As part of a February 2011 Darden analyst conference, the parent group announced it intended to add more than 200 Olive Garden locations in the following few years. The announcement came after a previous announcement that the company would be expanding into potential new international markets for the chain, including the Middle East and Asia, due to the maturity of the North American market. The company also announced it would begin licensing franchising partnerships, a new direction for the chain and its parent, which had traditionally relied on expansion via company-owned locations exclusively.

In 2011, Darden announced that it was going to begin co-locating Olive Garden and sibling chain Red Lobster locations. The new restaurants were designed for smaller markets and had separate entrances and dining areas, but unified kitchen and support areas. Menus remained separate, with customers only able to order from the location they are seated in. In 2014, Darden Restaurants announced intentions to sell Red Lobster, to close two Olive Garden and Red Lobster co-locations in Georgia and South Carolina, and to convert the remaining four co-locations into standalone Olive Garden restaurants.

In 2010, Olive Garden generated $3.3 billion in sales. Its closest competitor, Carrabba's Italian Grill, had generated $650.5 million in sales during the same year. By 2012, sales had decreased at Olive Garden. At the final quarter of 2011, sales at established Olive Garden locations had decreased by 2.5%. The Darden president and chief operating officer, said that Olive Garden at that point was "a beloved, but somewhat expected brand". The company introduced a three-course meal for $12.95 to try to stop the decline.

In 2011, Olive Garden implemented a mandatory tip-out program which allowed them to cut more of their employees' hourly wages to $2.13 per hour. In October 2012, Olive Garden became one of the first national restaurant chains to test converting most of its staff to part-time, aiming to limit the cost of paying for health care benefits for full-time employees.

On July 9, 2014, Olive Garden launched a new logo and restaurant design. This included the addition of online ordering and smaller lunch portions.

In 2018 Olive Garden, became the largest casual-dining restaurant chain in the United States in terms of system wide sales, a position it would hold until it was surpassed by Texas Roadhouse in 2025.

In August 2019, Darden responded to false claims that Olive Garden was financing Donald Trump's 2020 presidential campaign, stating: "We don't know where this information came from, but it is incorrect. Our company does not donate to presidential candidates." Financial records prove Olive Garden had not contributed to the campaign.

Following the January 6 United States Capitol attack, Anderson Cooper quipped the D.C. rioters would be going to celebrate at Olive Garden when they vacated the Capitol. Darden also replied to rumors that the chain would revoke its lifetime pasta pass to Sean Hannity was a "spoof".

== Advertising and marketing ==
Olive Garden's original slogan was "Good Times, Great Salad, Olive Garden". This was used when their main advertising focus was unlimited salad. When unlimited soup and breadsticks were added to the menu, the slogan was changed to "When you're here, you're family". The slogan changed in early 2013 to "We're all family here", but has since been reverted.

In the fall of 2013, Olive Garden started a promotion for the "Never Ending Pasta Bowl", where customers can eat all the pasta they want starting at $9.99. During the event, the restaurant served over 13 million bowls of pasta. In 2014, the restaurant continued the promotion but added the "Never Ending Pasta Pass", where customers can eat all the pasta they wanted during a seven-week period for $99. This promotion was limited to the first 1,000 people to purchase the pass online. The Pasta Pass promotion has been offered every year since. In 2019, Olive Garden added the "Lifetime Pasta Pass" offered to first fifty diners to sign up for the never ending one. After granted the first pass selectees were then offered the chance to sign up for the second one.

=== Tuscan Institute ===
Despite Olive Garden's advertising that it has a cooking institute in Tuscany, news outlets have reported that, in fact, there is no institute or school. Olive Garden does send a number of managers, trainers, and cooks to Tuscany each year, but they stay in a rented hotel and spend only a few hours at a time at a local restaurant in its off-season.

== Locations ==
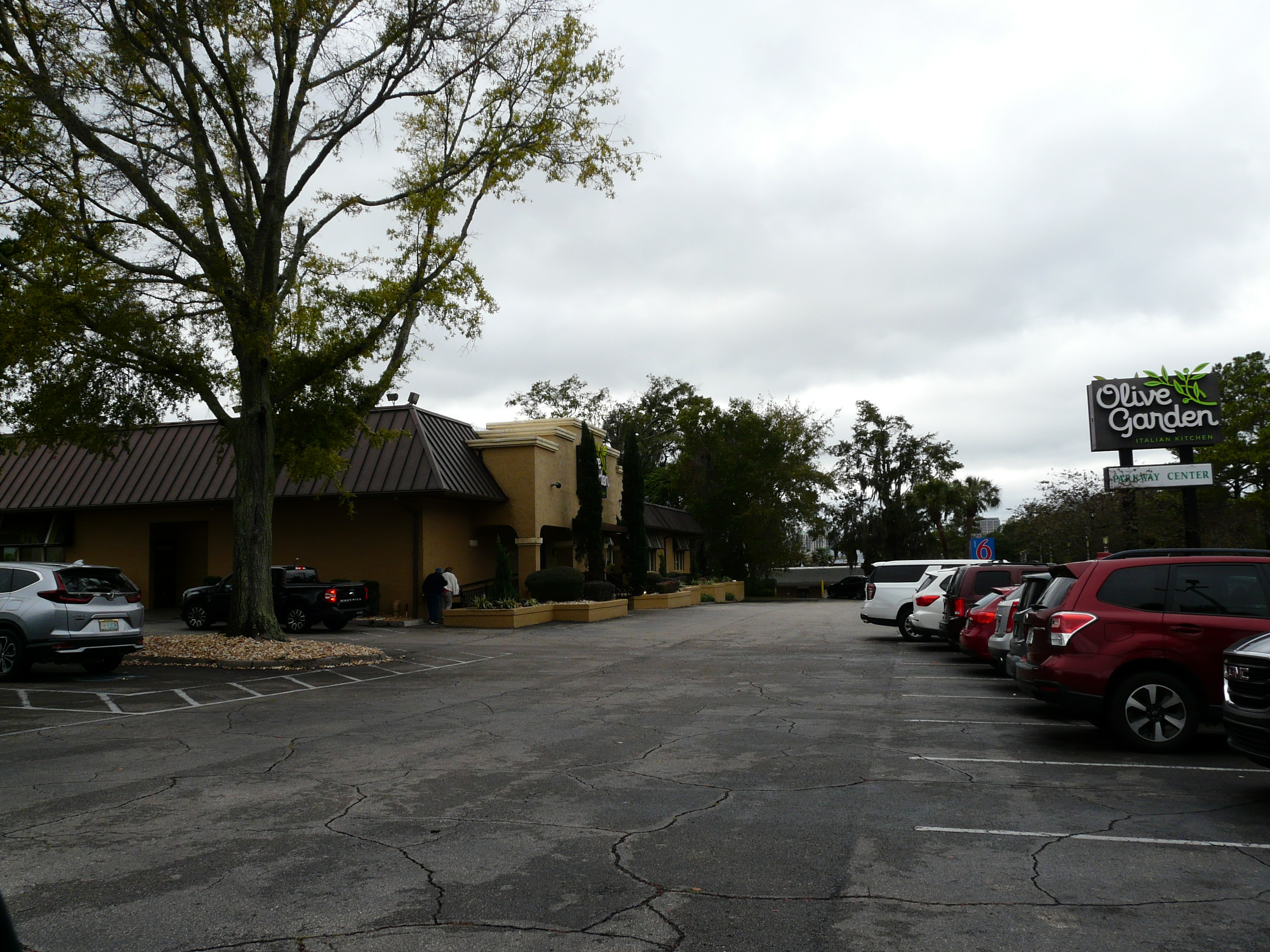
Olive Garden restaurant in Tallahassee, Florida

Newer restaurants are styled after a farmhouse in the town of Castellina in Chianti, Tuscany, Italy, on the grounds of the Rocca delle Macie winery. The farmhouse is home to the Riserva di Fizzano restaurant adjoining the company's Culinary Institute of Tuscany which was founded in 1999.

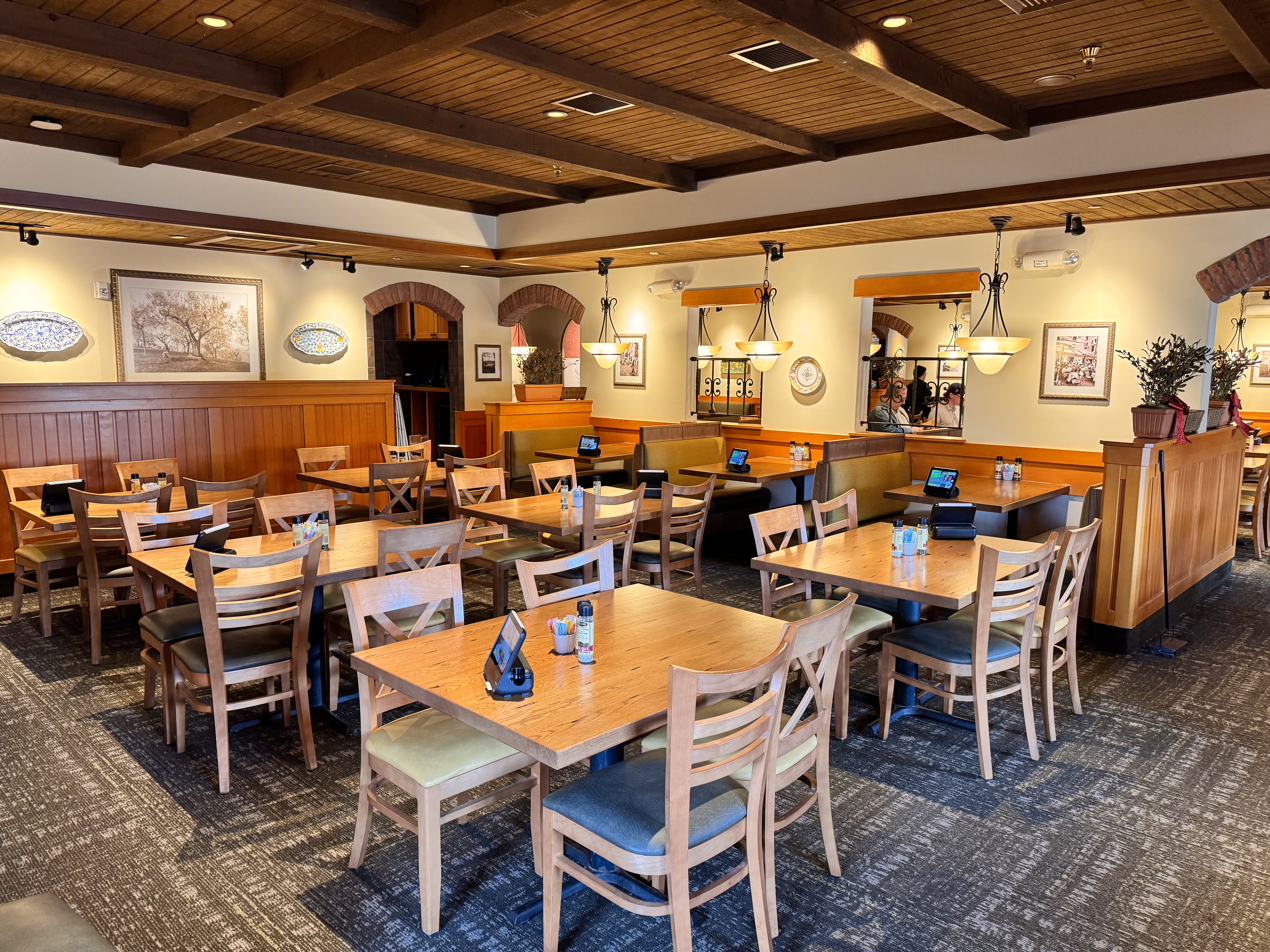
The interior of an Olive Garden restaurant in California, Maryland

As of February 13, 2022, the company operates 922 restaurants globally.

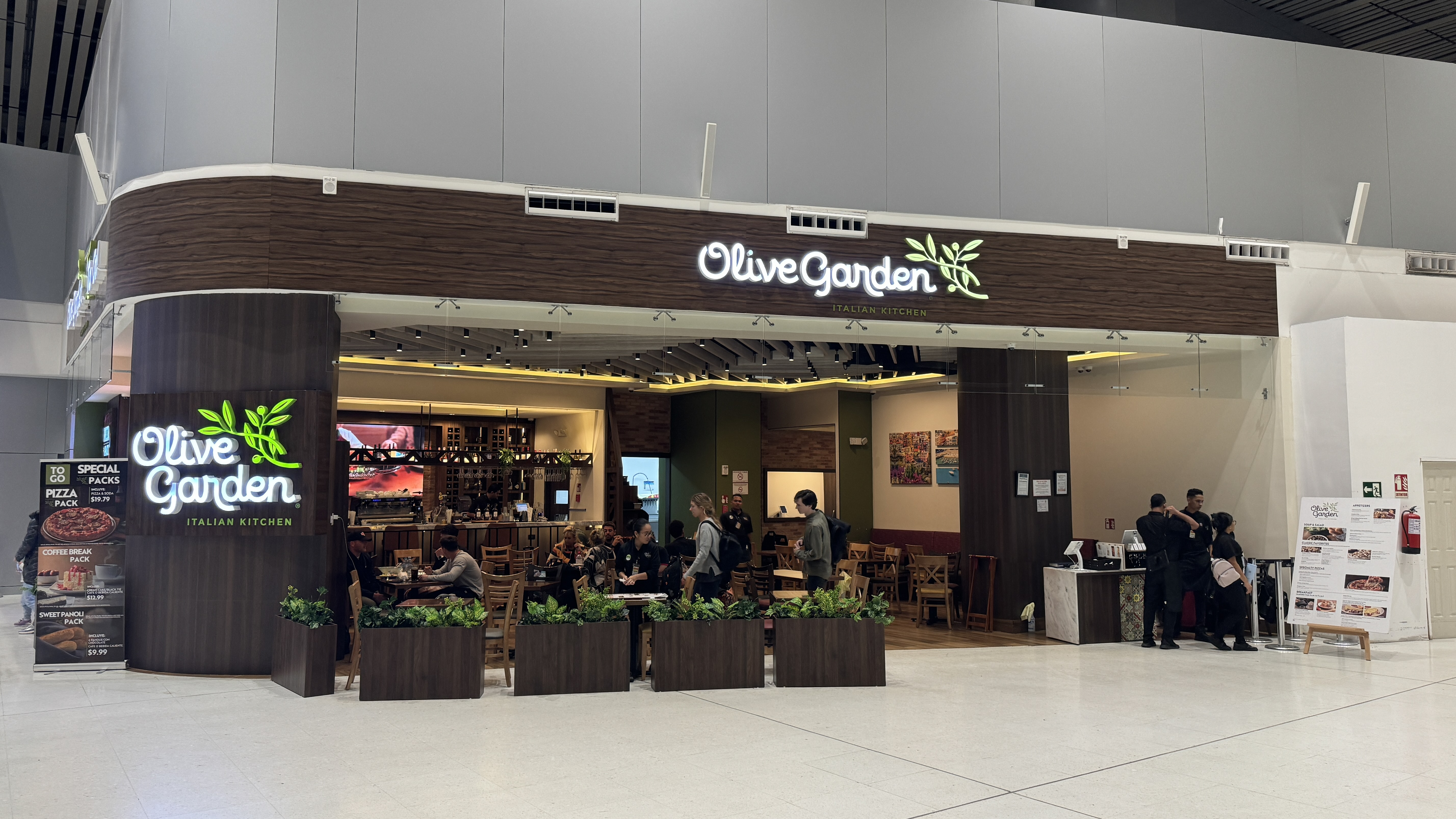
Olive Garden restaurant at Tocumen International Airport, Panama City, Panama

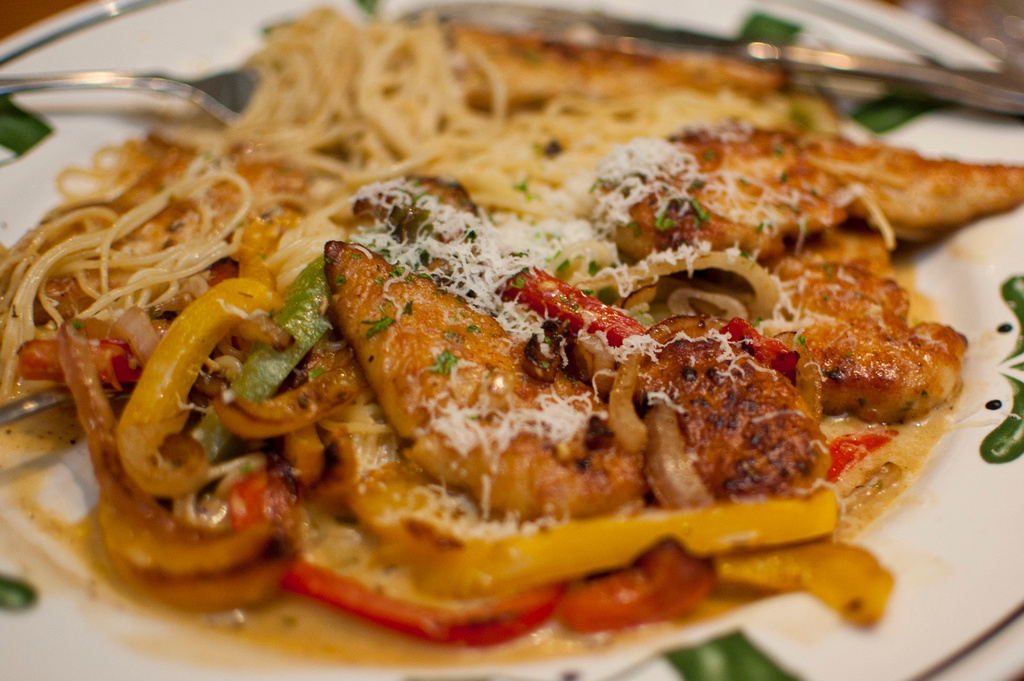
A plate of chicken scampi from Olive Garden

Countries outside of the United States where Olive Garden operates are:

Country	Details
Aruba	On June 21, 2022, opened the first and only Aruba location (as well as the only location in the Netherlands) at the Gloria complex.
Brazil	In 2014, Olive Garden opened its first restaurant in Brazil, located in terminal 3 of the Guarulhos International Airport in São Paulo. There are now 2 at Guarulhos; elsewhere in São Paulo at Center Norte, Vila Guilherme; at Morumbi, at Aricanduva, Vila Matilde; and at Parque Dom Pedro in Campinas.
Canada	Olive Garden entered the Canadian market in the early 1990s, opening restaurants in provinces including Ontario, Saskatchewan, Alberta, and British Columbia. In the 2000s, the Ontario restaurants closed, but Olive Garden remains open outside of the province. In 2026, Recipe Unlimited acquired the remaining restaurants and announced an expansion into Ontario.
Costa Rica	3 locations
Ecuador	On March 22, 2022, Olive Garden opened its first restaurant in Guayaquil, Ecuador, located in Riocentro Los Ceibos. There are a total of 2 in Guayaquil and one in Quito.
El Salvador	One restaurant at San Salvador, La Gran Vía
India	One location opened in 2026 at Worldmark 4, Aerocity, New Delhi
Mexico	13 locations as of March 2024. In late 2012, two restaurants were opened in Mexico City: Interlomas and Paseo de la Reforma, both no longer operating. Currently, there are four restaurants in Greater Mexico City: Parque Delta, Santa Fe, Toreo Parque Central, and Patio Universidad in Xoco, and beyond the Mexico City area also in Cancún (Plaza Malecón Las Américas), Guadalajara (Gran Plaza), León, Querétaro (city) and 3 in the Monterrey metropolitan area.
Panama	5 locations as of 2024 including two in Tocumen International Airport.
Philippines	In 2020, Olive Garden opened its first restaurant in the Philippines at Ayala Malls Manila Bay. Additional locations at Mall of Asia and The Verve, BGC Taguig.
Saudi Arabia	One restaurant at Atelier LaVie, Jeddah.
Spain	One location opened in 2026 at Calle Jorge Juan 33, Madrid.

== Menu ==
Olive Garden serves several types of Italian-American cuisine, including pasta dishes, steaks, and salads. The company advertises its breadsticks and centers its lunch menu around it. Additionally, the company advertises that its soups and sauces are made fresh in each location daily, instead of importing them from a commissary or outside vendor.

In June 2010, Olive Garden began to import parts of menu formats from its sibling chain, Seasons 52; it began selling smaller dessert portions, which it called "dolcini". These new products were modeled after Season 52's "mini-indulgences" product line.

=== Activist investor critique ===
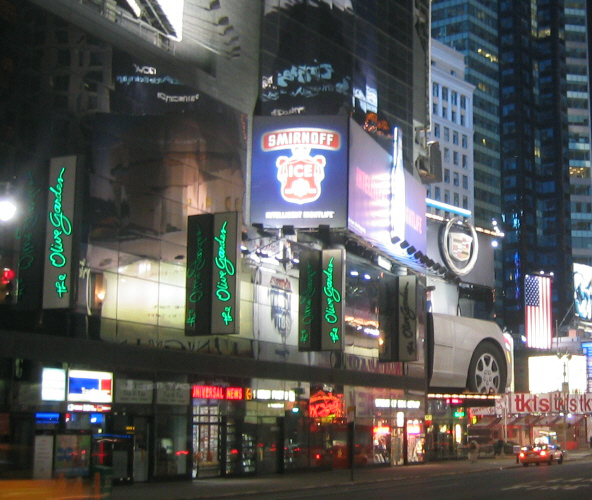
The Olive Garden restaurant in Times Square, New York City, 2003

In September 2014, Starboard Value, an activist hedge fund that had acquired a significant portion of Darden's stock and was challenging Darden's management, released a 294-slide presentation assembled by its founder Jeff Smith, that focused on ways the company was wasting money and failing to satisfy customers. Chief among them was the shortcomings of Olive Garden, which earned considerable media attention. Starboard claimed they justified replacing Darden's directors in an upcoming election with a slate of new directors sponsored by the hedge fund.

It cited details such as the unlimited breadsticks the chain offered diners, of which too many went to waste since they tended to go stale, Smith claimed, and paying extra for custom-length straws. The chain's menu was too complex, with some of its 96 items making no sense, such as vegetable lasagna topped with chicken ("if you wanted meat on your lasagna, you would order the meat lasagna" the slide read). The chain also had stopped the common practice of adding salt to the water in which it cooked its pasta in order to secure longer warranties on the pots, which made Smith incredulous: "Pasta is Olive Garden's core dish and must be cooked properly." He included photos of poorly executed dishes purchased at Olive Gardens compared with the photos on the chain's website, along with quotes from online reviews posted by disappointed customers.

Darden's management responded with a much shorter presentation two days later. Without going into specifics, it conceded most of Starboard's critiques were valid and that the company was already responding to those issues. It defended the unlimited breadsticks policy as "convey[ing] Italian hospitality" and rebutted another claim the hedge fund had made: packaging for take-out food, which the hedge fund had claimed was dishwasher-safe and thus needlessly expensive, was in fact merely microwave-safe. Nevertheless, a month later shareholders voted to replace the company's entire board of directors with Starboard's slate.

== Animal welfare ==
In 2016, Darden announced that it would phase out the use of battery cage eggs in its U.S. locations by 2018 and stop sourcing crated pork by 2025. In 2022, the animal welfare organization Open Wing Alliance criticized Darden and Olive Garden for failing to make sufficient progress toward the cage-free egg commitment. Later that year, Darden expanded its commitment to include both U.S. and international locations by 2027.

In 2016, Olive Garden faced protests by environmental, labor, and animal welfare groups for continuing to source meat and dairy products from animals raised in intensive conditions, including routine antibiotic use. In 2019, Darden announced that by 2023, it would stop sourcing meat from chickens treated with medically important antibiotics.

== See also ==
- H_{2}NO
