= Score a Score =

- Type: Private
- Industry: Advertising, Music, Film, Television
- Founded: 2010 in Los Angeles, CA
- Founder: Jordan Passman
- Headquarters: Los Angeles, CA
- Key people: Jordan Passman; Jake Weinreb
- Services: Music Licensing; Music Composition; Music Supervision; Sound Branding; Sound Design
- Website: scoreascore.com

Score a Score is a music production, licensing and supervision company headquartered in Los Angeles, California. Founded in 2010 by CEO, Jordan Passman, Score a Score represents a roster of over 400 composers world-wide and has worked with brands like Microsoft, Google, Coca-Cola, Taco Bell, Verizon, Mastercard, Kia and Gap as well as film trailers for Disney, Sony, Universal, Paramount, Warner Brothers, Fox, Amazon, and Netflix. Its services include custom scoring, music supervision, sonic branding and curated playlists from its catalog. In 2020, Score a Score made Inc. Magazine's annual Inc. 5000 list of the fastest-growing privately held companies in the U.S. for their fifth consecutive year.

In the summer of 2017, Score a Score worked with Fitzco//Mccann on Coca-Cola's Share a Coke campaign to create over 1000 unique songs based on names printed on bottles of Coke. The project would go on to win multiple awards, including several from OneShow and two pencils from D&AD.

== History ==
Jordan Passman launched Score a Score in 2010 in Beverly Hills. Originally created as a website to connect brands and composers, SAS landed their first big client when Lego anonymously posted a request seeking music. In 2014, Passman was selected by Forbes as one of their 30 under 30 in the music category. In 2017, Score a Score opened up their Boston office under the direction of COO, Jake Weinreb.

Score a Score's Marchese Taylor, Jake Weinreb and Jordan Passman were nominated for Best Music Supervision in a Docuseries at the 10th Guild of Music Supervisors Awards in 2020, for the Amazon docuseries Free Meek. When TikTok launched its commercial music library in 2020, 1,000 of its 4,000 tracks came from the Score a Score catalog.

In 2021, the company launched Homesick Sounds, an online soundboard of more than 50 loopable household sounds for people returning to offices after working from home. Its trailer work that year included campaigns for Black Widow, Soul, Wonder Woman 1984 and Cruella. For American Express's 2021 holiday campaign "Jingle Sells", created with Dentsu McGarry Bowen, Score a Score wrote and produced jingles for 100 small businesses, performed by Broadway singers including Rebecca Naomi Jones.

In 2023, the company partnered with composer Justin Hurwitz to bring his music to advertising campaigns. Its trailer work includes the international spot for Wicked. Its trailer music label, Locked by Score a Score, won a Silver Clio in the Theatrical Trailer/Teaser category of the 2025 Clio Music Awards for the official trailer for A24's Sing Sing. By 2025 the company's mood-music playlists had passed 2 billion streams, and it had increased its focus on sonic branding.

Score a Score was among the production companies credited on Friedreich's Back, a nine-episode social comedy series created by 21GRAMS for Biogen's Friedreich's ataxia treatment Skyclarys. The series won a Gold Lion at the 2025 Cannes Lions and a Graphite Pencil in the Pharma category at the 2026 D&AD Awards.

Score a Score composed the custom music for TurboTax's Super Bowl LX commercial "The Expert", starring Adrien Brody and directed by Craig Gillespie for R/GA. In the same game, the company provided the music for Toyota's "Superhero Belt" and a custom cover of "Holding Out for a Hero" for Zevo. Its earlier Super Bowl work includes music supervision and a custom cover for TurboTax's 2025 spot with Issa Rae, custom music for Totino's in 2025, and music supervision for Bud Light Next in 2022.
