= The Lost Island of Alanna =

1998 video game

- Developer: Raintree Media Inc.
- Publisher: The Coca-Cola Company
- Director: Dale Leary
- Designer: Dale Leary
- Programmers: Michael Hall; Ronald Lores
- Artists: Dale Leary; Michael Hall; Ronald Lores
- Platforms: Mac OS, Windows
- Release: March 1, 1998
- Genres: Graphic adventure, puzzle
- Mode: Single-player

The Lost Island of Alanna is a graphic adventure video game and marketing initiative conceived and directed by Dale Leary and developed with partner Michael Hall of Raintree Media for Coca-Cola Cherry. The game was produced for the brand in the fall of 1997 and released in the spring of 1998.

The Lost Island of Alanna represents an early example of integrated, digital, viral and social marketing using the internet. Alanna included a distributed CD-ROM game, integrated social chat rooms, under-the-cap codes, special product packaging, advertising, outdoor, and two promotional websites. It was all created, produced and managed nationally by Raintree Media throughout the full promotional duration.

== Strategy ==
The strategy was to create an underground campaign designed to increase the appeal of Cherry Coke to teens and young adults who are part of what was then "the emerging wired generation." Alanna was a marketing success, shifting to a youth brand in the minds of young consumers.

== Implementation ==
The campaign by Raintree Media created consumer engagement through underground social dialogue while integrating product placement within the myth of a CD-ROM computer game.

In the game, the player explores an island where an ancient civilization was concerned about passing on its wisdom but was wiped out by a volcano before it was able to share its precious knowledge. This civilization used clay bowls and a mixture of sparkling water and cherries in a tribal ceremony. The game cross-references this with bottles of Cherry Coke, on the labels of which are clues in the form of cuneiform characters, and then the player is encouraged to begin solving the mystery.

Clues to solve puzzles in the computer game were also distributed through other marketing channels, including the Cherry Coke website and another fictitious website called the Standlake University of Cultural Anthropology, which posted journal entries as clues.

Viral activities included hidden symbols under bottle caps, the aforementioned cuneiform bottle packaging designed by Raintree Media, and hidden within mainstream Cherry Coke magazine ads.

Socially, clues were leaked 'underground' in chat rooms by teams of teens managed by Raintree Media.

Apart from the Cherry Coke brand being minimized within the game The Lost Island of Alanna gameplay was unusual within the promotional brand-game genre. Not only was it far more complex but consumers were provided with very little information about the game, and no obvious goals or objectives were communicated. This meant that players merely began to explore the island and interact with the brand socially through various communication points in real life. It was all intended to create dialogue between the brand and the emerging Millennial generation.

== Gameplay ==
The CD-ROM gameplay of The Lost Island of Alanna consisted of a first-person journey through a very small interactive island centered around puzzle solving. The player moves by clicking on locations shown on the screen; the scene then crossfades into another frame where the player could continue exploring or solving puzzles.

The game had a single ending, at which point the mystery was solved. At the end, another game component was revealed in the form of a fortune cookie engagement; a secondary under-the-cap mechanism providing an extension of the promotion beyond the standard promotional period.

== Plot ==
A shipwreck was discovered off the coast of Syria that points to an ancient civilization called Alanna. Archaeologists at the fictional Standlake University followed the clues and located a volcanic island in the eastern Mediterranean sea just west of Cyprus. Like the historic island of Thera, much of Alanna was destroyed and its ancient culture obliterated by the eruption around the end of the late Bronze Age, according to the in-game Standlake University notes.

The Standlake University website also posted journal entries of a ledger recording that eight tablets made of clay, gemstones, and precious metals—and a letter written by the king of Alanna—were all found within the shipwreck. On these tablets are the answers to the culture of the Alannians. The player's quest was to unlock the riddles of the eight stone tablets, find the hidden chamber, and discover the secrets of Alanna.

== Enigmatic Plot ==
The Lost Island of Alanna's secret plot was revealed in the endgame. The creative concept was that the Alannian civilization believed that one's future could be read using 'magic' tribal bowls. One such clay bowl, inscribed with cuneiform was found on the shipwreck holding clues needed later. Legend had it that cherries would be smeared into the bottom of this tribal bowl, and natural sparkling water and maple serum would be poured into the bowl. Tribal wise men would stir and drink the contents, and then they read the stains; the darker stains remaining in cuneiform were believed to be the answers to questions.

This ancient Cherry Coke reference created the secret endgame mechanic.

The endgame mechanic was a different spin on the soda giant's collect-the-bottle-and-win promotions. In all, 32 different bottle labels were pushed into distribution along with 16 under the cap codes. As the cap and bottle pairings were random, so would be the combinations. The fortune cookie mechanism was simple: players could buy a bottle with the question they wanted answered and the bottle cap would 'tell the future'. This created a deeper social extension and viral pass-along beyond the buy-for-clues mechanism.

== Reception ==
Upon release, the game The Lost Island of Alanna was well received, with its first 750,000 copies being sold through request in two months. Consumers could call in or request copies from the Cherry Coke website. Unique, double-disc sets, one for the buyer and one for a friend, were included with GamePro magazine in July 1998.

The Lost Island of Alanna was successful for Cherry Coke and was widely accepted as a 'great free game'.

== Legacy ==
The Lost Island of Alanna's success sparked opportunities for several successive interactive campaigns by Raintree Media for the Coca-Cola Company. The NHL Challenge for Powerade along with Time Tremors for Cherry Coke released the following year with music by award-winning artist Jesper Kyd.
