= Prohibition (disambiguation) =

Prohibition commonly refers to the banning of alcoholic beverages and the period of time during which such bans are enforced.

Prohibition may also refer to:

- Drug prohibition
- Prohibitionism, a legal philosophy and political theory
- Prohibition (album), by Brigitte Fontaine, 2009
- Prohibition (miniseries), a 2011 TV documentary
- At-Tahrim, generally translated as "Prohibition", the 66th Surah of the Quran

== See also ==
- Prohibit (horse), a racehorse
- Christian views on alcohol § Prohibitionism
- "No" symbol, the general prohibition sign
- War on drugs, the campaign to reduce the illegal drug trade in the U.S.
