= Share a Coke =

Coca-Cola marketing campaign

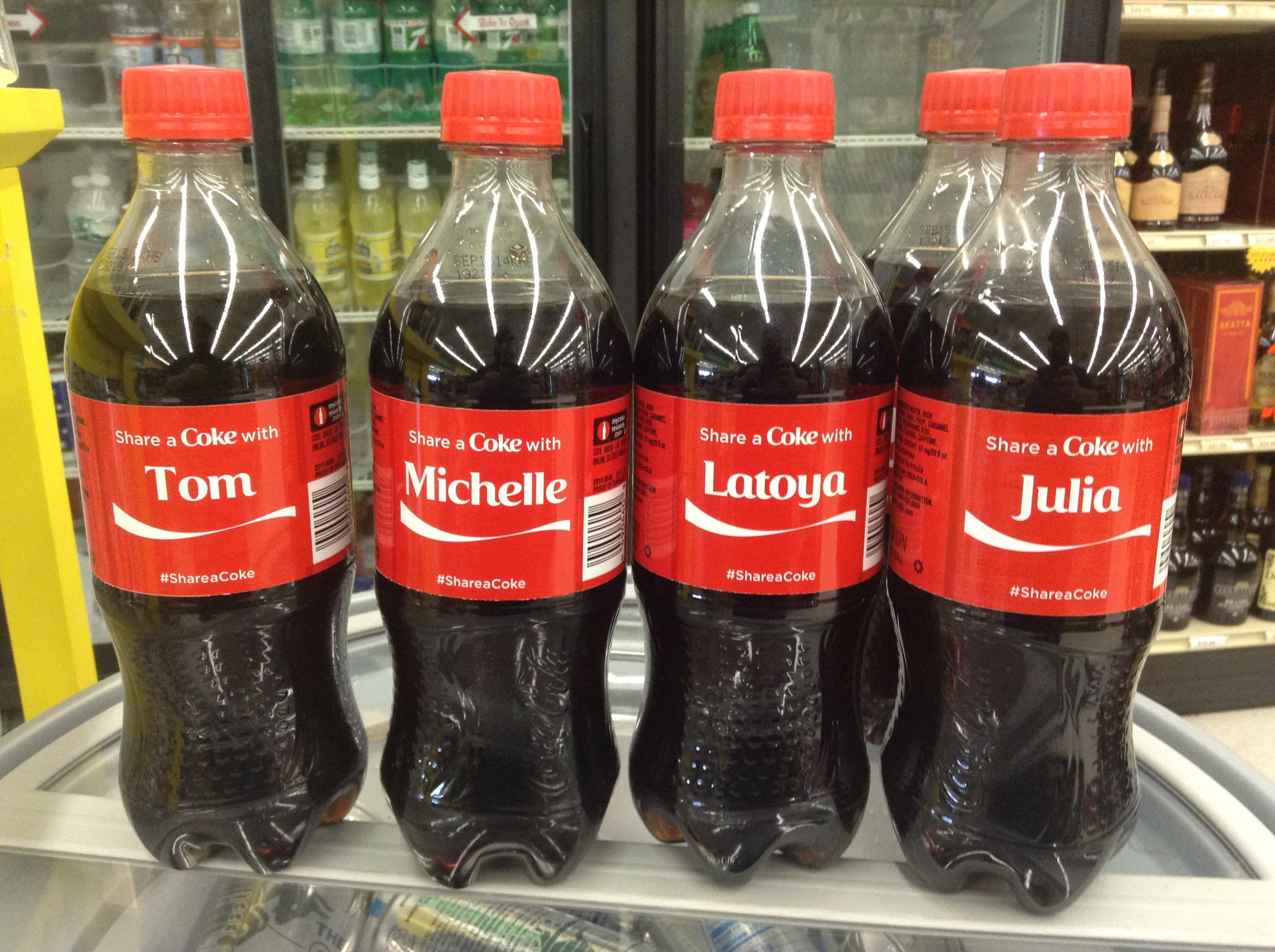
Share a Coke bottles with different names on them, as sold in the United States

Share a Coke is a multi-national marketing campaign of Coca-Cola. It debrands the traditional Coke logo, replacing "Coca-Cola" from one side of a bottle with the phrase "Share a Coke with" followed by a person's name. The campaign, which uses a list containing 250 of each market country's most popular names (generic nicknames and titles are also used in some cases), aims to have people go out and find a bottle with their name on it, then share it with their friends. The campaign began in Australia in 2011. The YOU font was designed by Ian Brignell.

== Campaign effectiveness and outcomes ==
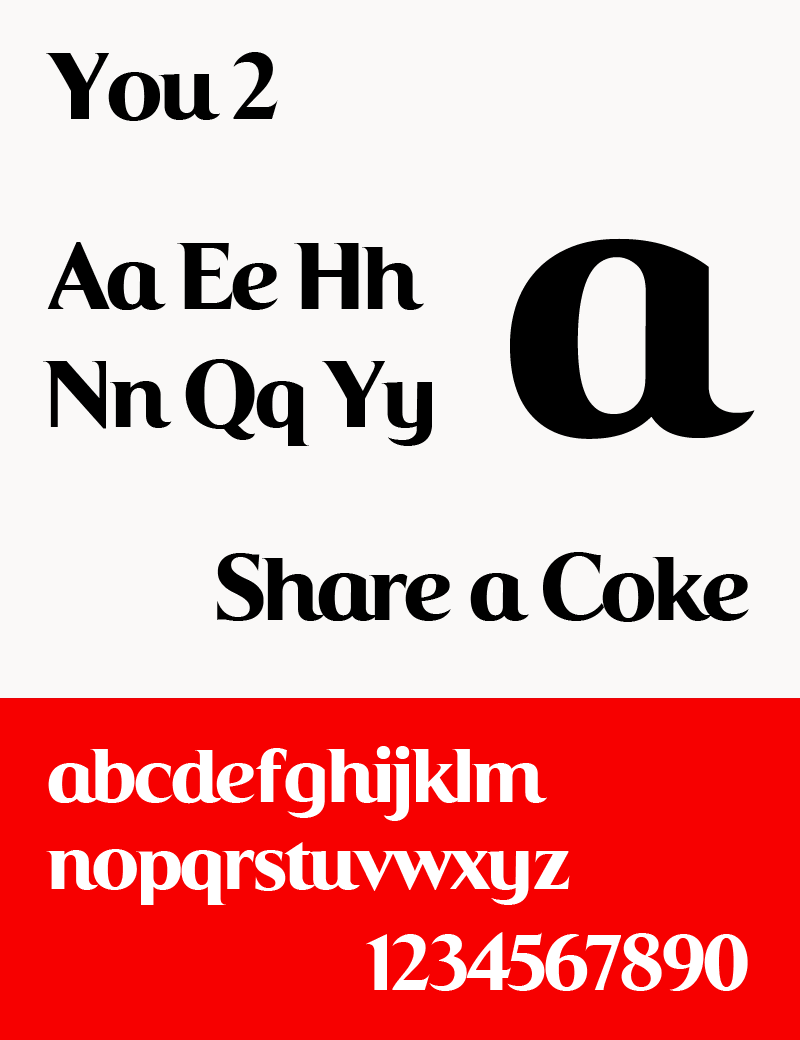
The typeface You 2 that was created for the campaign

The Share a Coke campaign was subsequently rolled out in over 80 countries. In Australia, the advertising agency Ogilvy estimated that the campaign increased Coke's share of the category by 4% and increased consumption by young adults by 7%. The campaign received multiple awards at the Creative Effectiveness Lion Awards at Cannes.

In the United States, where the campaign is credited with increasing sales by more than 2% reversing more than 10 years of decline in Coke consumption, the company and its agency has sought ways to extend the campaign while maintaining its relevance. In 2015, the company extended the campaign by increasing the number of names to 1,000. Nicknames such as "bro", "better half" and "sidekick" were also added to the inventory of names. In 2016, the company replaced people's names with lyrics from 70 popular songs including Lean on Me and We are the Champions. In 2017, the campaign returned to the US with a new variant; holiday destinations. Bottles of coke are labelled with favourite summer holiday spots such as Hawaii, Ibiza, Barbados etc. Additionally, Coca-Cola collaborated with McCann and Score a Score to create over 1000 unique songs based on names found on bottles of Coke.

Financial analysts and advertising experts have used the success of the 'Share-a-Coke' campaign to remind marketers and advertisers of the need to personalise the communications message.

== See also ==
- Advertising management
- Brand management
- List of Coca-Cola slogans
