= 2023 Securities and Exchange Commission charges against the LDS Church and Ensign Peak Advisors =

On February 21, 2023, the United States Securities and Exchange Commission (SEC) charged the Church of Jesus Christ of Latter-day Saints (LDS Church) and its non-profit investment arm, Ensign Peak Advisors (EP), for failing to disclose the LDS Church's investments, and instead creating shell companies whose purpose was to obscure the church's portfolio. The SEC further charged that the forms that were filed by the shell companies deliberately concealed the amount of control that EP had over investment decisions.

The charges were settled, with the LDS Church paying a $1 million penalty, and EP paying a $4 million penalty.

In September 2023, the Salt Lake Tribune suggested that the LDS Church may have additionally failed to file disclosure forms for its $9 billion pension and health plan fund. A representative for the LDS Church stated that the funds filings were discussed with the SEC during the "Ensign Peak matter."

== Background ==
In 1963, the LDS Church was on the brink of insolvency, and N. Eldon Tanner was brought in to rescue the LDS Church finances. Tanner emphasized investing and a disdain for deficit spending, returning the LDS Church finances to sound footing. In 1997, the LDS Church split off its investment division and created a separate legal entity called EP.

Form 13F is a quarterly report filed, per SEC regulations, by "institutional investment managers" with control over $100M in assets to the SEC, listing all equity assets under management. The purpose of the form is to provide transparency over who owns stocks.

== Timeline ==
- 1997: EP created as a non-profit to manage LDS Church investments
- 1998: Senior leadership of the LDS Church, defined as the First Presidency and Presiding Bishopric, approved a plan to file Form 13F through a separate entity in order to prevent disclosure of the securities portfolio.
- 2001: The first of thirteen shell companies was created, a trust fund with separate limited liability companies (LLC) under the trust's ownership. The LLC had an address in Glendale, California but did not conduct business out of that site. Employees of EP were assigned as managers of the trust, but not granted investment discretion.
- 2003: Form 13F is first filed for the newly created shell company.
- 2005: Senior leaders of the LDS Church approve creating a second shell company, based out of Wilmington, Delaware. The church created the new entity after discovering that the person signing the forms was listed in a public directory as an LDS Church employee and that the shell company could be traced back to the church.
- 2011: Five additional shell companies were approved by senior leaders after LDS Church leaders became concerned that the growing size of the investment portfolio would bring "unwanted attention." Addresses of the five shell companies were in Delaware, but no business was conducted in that state.
- 2014: An internal LDS Church audit "highlighted the risk that the SEC might disagree with the approach" but did not recommend changes.
- 2015: An unnamed third party connected some of the shell companies with EP and brought the issue to senior leaders of the LDS Church. The senior leaders approved a plan to "gradually and carefully adapt Ensign Peak’s corporate structure to strengthen the portfolio’s confidentiality." This included the creation of six more shell companies, whose managers had "common names and a limited presence on social media, and were therefore less likely to be publicly connected to Ensign Peak or the Church." Selected managers were given limited information on the purpose of the shell companies.
- 2017: A second LDS Church audit again highlighted the risk of the investment approach.
- 2018: The Mormon Leaks website discovers that the 13 shell companies all have web domains hosted by LDS Church servers. Business managers are also connected by Mormon Leaks as LDS Church employees. Two of the business managers resign, out of concern with what had been asked of them. They are replaced with different managers.
- 2019: The SEC first contacts the LDS Church over its reporting structure.
- 2020: EP files a consolidated disclosure for the first time.
- 2023: On February 21, the SEC announces publicly the charges against the LDS Church and EP, along with the settlement. The church agrees to pay $1 million and EP agrees to a $4 million penalty.

== Structure of shell companies ==
Shell companies were formed as LLCs. LLCs were designed to make it difficult to connect with the LDS Church and EP. LLCs were dispersed across geographic locations throughout the United States outside the state of Utah. EP granted management authority to a hand-picked manager but retained investment authority and discretion over each LLC.

The SEC asserts that managers of the LLCs were not given sufficient information to accurately check the box that the form filled out was "true, correct and complete." Several times electronic signatures were forwarded to the SEC by EP before managers provided handwritten signatures. Additionally, managers incorrectly misstated that they were signing forms at the location of the LLC's stated address, given that each manager was located in Salt Lake City, Utah.

== Response ==
Henry T. C. Hu, a corporate and securities law professor at the University of Texas law school, stated, "What the law requires is so clear that I am genuinely surprised that anyone would do this" Jacob S. Frenkel, a former senior counsel in the SEC's division of enforcement, commented in regards to the small size of the fine: "They are showing institutional respect for the church. If this had been a private institution, the monetary penalty would have much larger."

Sam Brunson, a member of the LDS Church and tax law professor at Loyola University Chicago, remarked on the "incredibly aggressive" way of obscuring finances "for the last 70 years or so, the Mormon Church has had an ethos of keeping its finances private."

=== LDS Church response ===
In a statement, the church said that:

The Church's senior leadership received and relied upon legal counsel when it approved the use of the external companies to make the filings. Ensign Peak handled the mechanics of the filing process. The Church's senior leadership never prepared or filed the specific reports at issue... In June 2019, the SEC first expressed concern about Ensign Peak’s reporting approach. Ensign Peak adjusted its approach and began filing a single aggregated report. Since that time, 13 quarterly reports have been filed in full accordance with SEC requirements... We reached resolution with the SEC. We affirm our commitment to comply with the law, regret mistakes made, and now consider this matter closed.
