= Coming Together (advertisement) =

2013 Coca-Cola Company advertisement

- Language: English
- Running time: 2 minute
- Release date: January 14, 2013
- Country: United States, United Kingdom

Coming Together is a 2-minute ad created and distributed by the Coca-Cola Company and launched on the night of January 14, 2013, on several cable networks.

== Message ==
The reasons the ad argues Coca-Cola cares about consumer health include that they are now offering over 180 low- and no-calorie beverages. It also notes that "All calories count, no matter where they come from."

== Reactions ==
According to USA Today's Nanci Hellmich, "Critics say the company is doing damage control to combat the widespread belief that sugary beverages contribute to obesity." Anna Lappe was quoted in The Guardian as saying, "This feel-good PR blitz is just another example of the company trying to protect brand goodwill amidst growing public concern about its most profitable products: sodas." On her blog, Food Politics, Marion Nestle wrote, "The ad is an astonishing act of chutzpah, explainable only as an act of desperation to do something about the company's declining sales in the U.S. and elsewhere." Additionally, public health lawyer Michele Simon wrote, "They are downplaying the serious health effects of drinking too much soda and making it sound like balancing soda consumption with exercise is the only issue, when there are plenty of other reasons not to consume too much of these kinds of products." She also "...dismissed the ads as pure public relations and noted that the industry faced an onslaught of public health efforts to curb consumption of sugary sodas, like efforts around the country to impose taxes on high-sugar drinks and Mayor Michael Bloomberg's move to restrict the sizes of sodas sold in movie theaters and other spots in New York City." In the aforementioned blog post, Professor Nestle asserted that "If Coke really wanted to help prevent obesity, it would STOP:

- Targeting its "drink more Coke" marketing to kids.
- Targeting marketing to low-income minorities.
- Lobbying and spending a fortune to defeat soda taxes and caps on soda sizes.
- Fighting attempts to remove vending machines from schools.
- Pricing drinks so the largest sizes are the best value.
- "Bribing" health professions organizations to shut up about research linking sweetened beverages to poor diets and weight gain.
- Pushing Coke sales in developing countries where rates of obesity and related conditions are skyrocketing."

With regard to the ad's assertion that "all calories count, no matter where they come from," critics have pointed out that "calories from soda are entirely empty calories from added sugar and contain no nutritional value." This led The Atlantic's Ruth Faden to declare that this specific assertion was "inappropriately misleading", as well as claiming that there is "considerable research" linking sugary drinks to obesity. It was also highlighted in a story by the Medill School of Journalism, which quoted Brenda Murray, a bariatric dietitian, who said, "They're saying a calorie is just a calorie. But it's not the amount of calories you take in, it's the kind of calories, too." The ad was also criticized by outspoken critic of sugar David Ludwig, who wrote that "I'd like to see the big beverage companies market less sugar not sugarcoat their marketing." He also stated that "Consuming sugary drinks increases the risk of obesity more than any other food that we know of, based on recent research (by which he means a September 2012 study in the NEJM) An opinion piece in the New York Daily News countered the commercial's argument that "our industry [Big Soda] has voluntarily changed its offerings [in schools] to primarily waters, juices, and low- and no-calorie options." The article's author, Mark Pendergrast, wrote that "the company was forced to take its sugary beverages out of the schools, in the face of threats from the same lawyers who took on tobacco. Pendergrast also argued that most of the actions Coke bragged about in the commercial were actually more profit-driven than anything else; for instance, the smaller size cans allow them to make more money because the price per ounce is higher. Similarly, he wrote that "...when the company brags that nearly a quarter of its beverages worldwide are low or no calorie, it doesn't mention that it is simply adjusting to the marketplace. In 1998, soft drink sales in the United States peaked." He concluded that Coca-Cola had only taken "minor steps" to combat obesity and, after pointing out that the company had lobbied hard against soda taxes in many different states, "call[ed] on the company to shock the business and public health world by finally supporting higher taxes on its products. Studies have repeatedly shown that educating people doesn't change their bad habits, but hitting them in the pocketbook does."

== Commendation from The Street ==
In contrast to the criticism detailed above, the Coca-Cola Company's efforts to maintain sales growth and stock value in the face of the obesity epidemic were commended by Richard Saintvillus of TheStreet.com. Saintvillus wrote:

""Liquid candy", as soda is often called, is no longer just a "fun" moniker. In some cases, it's become a life or death situation. Here, too, Coca-Cola is not alone in overcoming this challenge. I don't believe it's coincidence that for both Pepsi and Dr. Pepper Snapple (DPS), sales volumes were also down.

The question, though, is how much investors are willing to risk that Coca-Cola can still thrive in a more health-conscious market.

In that regard, I don't believe that Coca-Cola's management has received enough credit for the fine job it has done in educating consumers about the health effects of its products. The company done this, while at the same time promoting regular exercise. It is taking the obesity issue head-on. But the company hasn't stopped innovating."

== See also ==
- Criticism of Coca-Cola
- List of Coca-Cola slogans
