= Open Happiness =

Marketing campaign

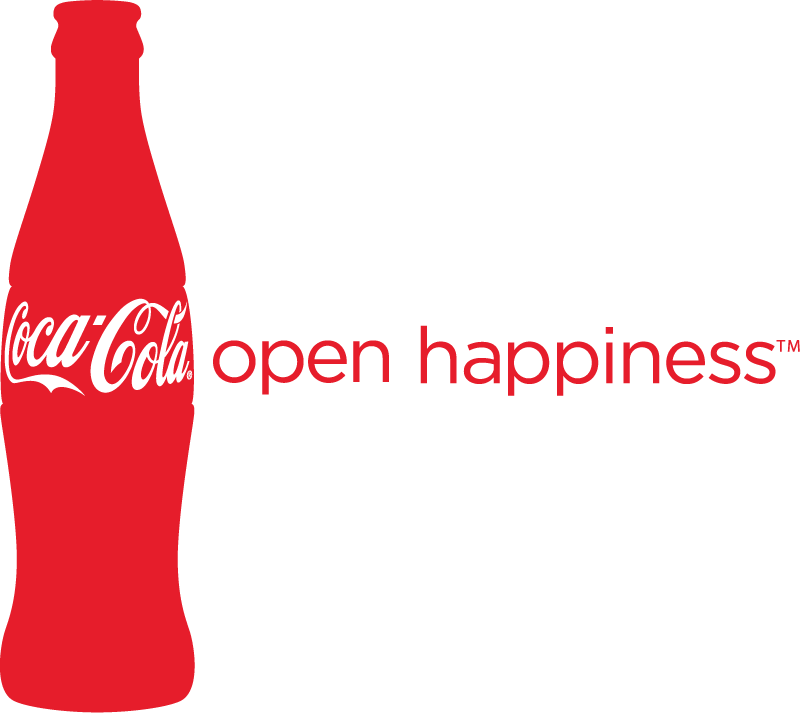
- Logo for the Open Happiness marketing campaign
- Agency: either Wieden + Kennedy or McCann-Erickson
- Client: The Coca-Cola Company
- Release date: 2009
- Slogan: Enjoy life's simple pleasures

Open Happiness was a global marketing campaign for The Coca-Cola Company that was rolled out worldwide in the first half of 2009, following the company's "Coke Side of Life" advertising campaign. It was developed by the Wieden + Kennedy creative agency. The campaign ended in January 2016 when Coca-Cola replaced its slogan with "Taste the Feeling".

== Strategy ==
The campaign was launched on the reality television series American Idol on January 21, 2009, and rolled out to other national markets over the following weeks. In the United States, commercials following the Open Happiness theme appeared during NBC's broadcast of Super Bowl XLIII on February 1, 2009, and during ABC's broadcast of the 81st Academy Awards on February 22, 2009. Marketing for The Coca-Cola Company based on the Open Happiness theme also appeared in the United States as print ads in newspapers, in television commercials, in outdoor advertising, and in in-store advertising.

== Music ==
Music plays a central role in the campaign. The first Open Happiness song was initially featured in a television commercial for the American market. The song was later released as a single. It is a collaboration between Cee-Lo Green, Patrick Stump (from Fall Out Boy), Brendon Urie (from Panic! at the Disco), Travie McCoy (from Gym Class Heroes) and Janelle Monáe, with Polow Da Don and Butch Walker each producing their own version. The Butch Walker version is heard in some radio ads, while the Polow Da Don version received a music video. Directed by award-winning director Alan Ferguson, the music video debuted on MTV in July 2009.

The Philippine version was released in April 2009. The song was performed by the five-piece band Sandwich and a music video was created to it as well. It was never released as a single.

In May 2009, the Coca-Cola Company launched the Open Happiness in the Middle East markets, and an Arabic language-version of the song was recorded by Lebanese pop icon Nancy Ajram, called "Eftah Tefrah".

The Coca-Cola Company later began marketing the Open Happiness theme to East Asian markets in June 2009. The Open Happiness song was adapted to the Cantonese language for Hong Kong; the song is sung by Hong Kong pop star Joey Yung in the country's version of the song and music video.

In June 2009, a version of the song for Singapore was released later in the same month after Hong Kong, which had local pop stars Derrick Hoh and Jocie Guo provide vocals. The song's music video was filmed by Warner Music.

In July 2009, the Open Happiness was launched in the Chinese market, where a Chinese version of the song was recorded by Taiwan singer and songwriter Wang Leehom. In 2010, Taiwan singer, A-Mei also recorded a version of the song.

The Canadian version of Open Happiness was recorded by Kardinal Offishall, Bedouin Soundclash, and Cœur de pirate. It was used during the Vancouver 2010 Olympic Winter Games Torch Relay and at Coca-Cola's Pavilion during the games.

On October 28, 2009 Monkey Majik released their own Japanese rendition of Open Happiness. A music video was made for the single's release.

In November 2009, The Coca-Cola Company launched the Indonesian version of Open Happiness, with the title "Buka Semangat Baru (Open a New Spirit)". It is sung by Marcello Tahitoe (better known as Ello), Ipang, Berry from the hip-hop/rock group Saint Loco, and Indonesian-Philippines pop star, Lala Karmela.

In February 2010, the Korean version of Open Happiness, performed by 2PM, was released as a digital download single.

The song charted in the United States, New Zealand, France, the United Arab Emirates, and Australia. In China, the song simultaneously reached the number one spot on several music charts.

During the 2010 holiday season, Train recorded new vocals for their Coca-Cola single "Shake Up Christmas" over the same music composed for the "Open Happiness" song. The ad was re-released in 2011, with Natasha Bedingfield replacing Train.

The Brazilian version was still in use as of 2011, however the slogan has been adapted to "125 Years Opening Happiness", in occasion of the brand's anniversary.

The main five notes of "Open Happiness" is remembered as one of the most famous and recognized jingles associated to Coca-Cola, becoming part of the trademark identity of Coca-Cola and being sampled in several famous songs used in Coke marketing campaigns, such as "Wavin' Flag" by K'naan for the 2010 FIFA World Cup, "Anywhere in the World" by Mark Ronson and Katy B for the 2012 Summer Olympics and "The world is ours" by Aloe Blacc and David Correy for the 2014 FIFA World Cup.

== Commissioned art ==
In 2011, Coca-Cola commissioned American artist David Kracov to create a 3x3 foot butterfly-themed metal wall-sculpture titled "Open Happiness", in honor of the company's 125th Anniversary.

== See also ==
- List of Coca-Cola slogans
