= List of Coca-Cola slogans =

The Coca-Cola Company has used various advertising slogans to market Coca-Cola since its inception in 1886. The company uses a combination of international advertising campaigns and national or regional campaigns. Following is a list of some of its slogans.

== United States (also internationally) ==
Slogans used by Coca-Cola in its home country the United States may also be used in other countries.

- 1886 – Drink Coca-Cola
- 1886 – Delicious and Refreshing
- 1905 – Coca-Cola revives and sustains.
- 1906 – The Great National Temperance Beverage.
- 1908 – Good til the last drop.
- 1910 – Whenever you see an Arrow think of Coca-Cola
- 1917 – Three million a day.
- 1922 – Thirst knows no season.
- 1923 – Enjoy thirst.
- 1924 – Refresh yourself.
- 1925 – Six million a day.
- 1926 – It had to be good to get where it is.
- 1927 – Pure as Sunlight.
- 1927 – Around the corner from anywhere.
- 1928 – Coca-Cola ... pure drink of natural flavors.
- 1929 – The pause that refreshes.
- 1932 – Ice-cold sunshine.
- 1937 – America's Favorite Moment
- 1938 – The best friend thirst ever had.
- 1938 – Thirst asks nothing more.
- 1939 – Coca-Cola goes along.
- 1939 – Whoever You Are, Whatever You Do, Wherever You May Be, When You Think of Refreshment Think of Ice Cold Coca-Cola
- 1941 – Coca Cola is Coke
- 1942 – The only thing like Coca-Cola is Coca-Cola itself.
- 1944 – How about a Coke?
- 1945 – Passport to refreshment.
- 1947 – Coke knows no season.
- 1948 – Where There's Coke There's Hospitality.
- 1949 – Along the Highway to Anywhere.
- 1952 – What you want is a Coke.
- 1954 – For people on the go.
- 1956 – Coca-Cola...makes good things taste better.
- 1957 – Sign of good taste.
- 1958 – The cold, crisp taste of Coke.
- 1958 – Coca-Cola refreshes you best.
- 1959 – Be Really Refreshed, with a related jingle performed by The McGuire Sisters
- 1963 – Things go better with Coke, with a related jingle performed by The Limeliters.
- 1969 – It's the Real Thing.
- 1971 – "I'd Like to Buy the World a Coke", with a related song by The New Seekers
- 1975 – Look up, America.
- 1976 – Coke adds life.
- 1979 – Have a Coke and a smile, see the related commercial "Hey Kid, Catch!"
- 1982 – Coke is it!
- 1985 – America's real choice
- 1985 – We've Got a Taste for You
- 1986 – Red, White & You, for Coca-Cola Classic
- 1986 – Catch the Wave, for New Coke
- 1987 – Can't Beat the Feeling
- 1989 – Official Soft Drink of Summer
- 1991 – Can't Beat The Real Thing.
- 1993 – Always Coca-Cola.
- 1995 – Always and Only Coca-Cola; secondary radio jingle
- 1998 – Born to be red.
- 1998 – Coca-Cola always the real thing! (UK)
- 1999 – Coca-Cola. Enjoy.
- 2001 – Life tastes good
- 2003 – Coca-Cola...Real.
- 2005 – Make It Real.
- 2006 – The Coke side of life
- 2009 – Open Happiness
- 2016 – Taste the Feeling, with a song by Avicii and Conrad Sewell
- 2020 – Turn Up Your Rhythm
- 2020 – Together Tastes Better
- 2020 – Open like never before
- 2021 – Real Magic

== Australia and New Zealand ==
Coca-Cola has been in Australia since 1938, was introduced in New Zealand soon afterwards.

- 1961 – Be refreshed
- 1964 – Things go better with Coke
- 1972 – It's the real thing
- 1977 – Coke adds life
- 1980 – Smile
- 1982 – Coke is it!
- 1989 – You Can't Beat the Feeling
- 1993 – Always Coca-Cola
- 2000 – Coca-Cola. Enjoy.
- 2001 – Life tastes good
- 2004 – Coca-Cola...Real.
- 2007 – The Coke side of life
- 2010 – Open Happiness
- 2011 – Share a Coke
- 2016 – Real Taste. Uplifting Refreshment
- 2016 – Taste The Feeling
- 2018 – Kia ora, mate (Greetings Mate or Greetings Death in te reo Maori)
- 2020 – Together Tastes Better
- 2021 – Real Magic

== Czech Republic ==
Coca-Cola was first bottled in Czechoslovakia in 1971.

- 1982 – Coca-Cola.To je ono! (Coke is it!)
- 1990 – Coca-Cola je to pravé! (The Real Thing!)
- 1994 – Vždy Coca-Cola (Always Coca-Cola)
- 1995 – Osvěžení, jaké jste ještě nezažili! (Refreshment you have yet to experience!), for Coca-Cola Light
- 1996 – Žij jinak! (Live differently!), for Coca-Cola Cherry
- 1996 – Coca-Cola, to pravé Vánoční osvěžení (Coca-Cola, the real Christmas refreshment)
- 1997 – Coca-Cola je k jídlu to pravé (Coca-Cola is good with Food)
- 1997 – Překvapení pod každým víčkem (Surprise under every cap)
- 1997 – To pravé Vánoční osvěžení! (The real Christmas refreshment)
- 1998 – Žízeň uhasí, mysl osvěží (Quenches thirst, refreshes mind)
- 1998 – Už pro ten pocit (Just for the feeling), for Coca-Cola Light
- 200x – Pravá chuť. Zero cukr. (Real taste. Zero sugar), for Coca-Cola Zero
- 2000 – Vychutnejte si! (Enjoy!)
- 2001 – Vychutnejte si to pravé Vánoční osvěžení (Enjoy the real Christmas refreshment)
- 2002 – Chuť, kterou miluje celý svět (A taste the whole world loves)
- 2002 – Osvěž se na Ex! (Refresh yourself in one shot!)
- 2003 – Chihuahua! Spolu na jedné vlně! (Chihuahua! Together on one wave!)
- 2003 – To pravé Vánoční osvěžení (The real Christmas refreshment)
- 2004 – Vždy osvěží (Always Refreshes)
- 2006 – Ber život s radostí (Enjoy life with happiness)
- 2006 – Neodolatelná chuť (Irresistible taste), for Coca-Cola Light
- 2007 – Podělte se o kouzlo Vánoc (Share the Christmas Spirit)
- 2008 – Vánoce s chutí (Christmas with taste)
- 2009 – Radost otevřít (Open Happiness)
- 2012 – Pravá chuť. Nula cukru. Je to možné? (Real taste. Zero sugar. Possible?), for Coca-Cola Zero
- 2016 – Taste the Feeling
- 2021 – Real Magic
- 2023 – Recipe for Magic

== Egypt ==
- 1951 – Moment of Relaxation...benefits thousands of Egyptians
- 1951 – The Pause that Refreshes...benefits thousands of Egyptians

== Germany ==
- 194x – Mach mal Pause (Take a break)
- 1976 – Coke macht mehr draus (Coke Adds Life)
- 2023 – Recipe for Magic

== Hungary ==
Coca-Cola began operating in Hungary in 1968.

- 1989 – Csúcs ez az érzés (You Can't Beat the Feeling)
- 1993 – Mindig Coca-Cola (Always Coca-Cola)
- 1996 – Coca‑Cola. Érezd (Coca-Cola. Enjoy)
- 2001 – Élni jó (Living is good)
- 2006 – Az élet Coke oldalán (The Coke Side of Life)
- 2009 – Nyiss a Boldogságra (Open Happiness)
- 2016 – Kóstold meg az érzést (Taste the Feeling)
- 2023 – Recipe for Magic

== India ==
Coca-Cola was first sold in India in 1956. However, the company left India in 1977 after the government required the submission of its formula. Coke returned to India in 1993 as Coca-Cola India.

- 1956 – Refresh Yourself
- पीओ सर उठा के (Pī'ō sar uṭhā kē, Drink with pride)
- 1971 – Things Go Better with Coke
- 1993 – Life Ho To Aisi (Life As It Should Be)
- 200x – जो चाहो हो जाये, कोका-कोला enjoy! (Jo Chaho ho jaye, Coca-Cola enjoy!)
- 2002 – ठंडा मतलब Coca-Cola! (Thanda matlab Coca-Cola!) (Cold drink means Coca-Cola!)
- 200x – Pio Sar Utha Ke
- 200x – Sabka Thanda Ek
- 2009 – Taste The Feeling
- 2009 – Open Happiness
- 20xx – Khud Ko Jagaa, Ek Thanda Lagaa
- 2011 – Burrrrrrrrr!
- 201x – Coke khule toh baat chale (Coke opens, the conversation starts)
- 201x – Har Rishta Bola, Mere Naam Ki Coca-Cola
- 201x – Say it with Coke!
- 2021 – Real Magic
- 2023 – Recipe for Magic

== Indonesia and Malaysia ==
- 1970 – Minumlah Coca-Cola (Drink Coca-Cola)
- 1982 – Coca-Cola Tentu! (Indonesia) (Coca-Cola is it!)
- 1982 – Tentulah Coca-Cola (Malaysia) (Coca-Cola is it!)
- 1990 – Nikmatnya Tak Terhingga! (You Can't Beat the Feeling)
- 1993 – Always Coca-Cola
- 1996 – Semangat Coca-Cola (Coca-Cola Enjoy)
- 2003 – Rasakan Semangat Hidup (Life Tastes Good)
- 2003 – Segarkan Harimu (Refresh Your Day)
- 2004 – Segarnya Mantap (Feel Refreshed)
- 2006 – Rasakan Hidup ala Coca-Cola (Feel Alive on The Coke Side of Life)
- 2007 – Hidup ala Coca-Cola (Live on the Coke Side of Life)
- 2008 – Brrr... Hidup ala Coca-Cola (Brrr... Live on The Coke Side of Life)
- 2008 – Coca-Cola Zero no sugar (Great Taste, Zero Sugar), for Coca-Cola Zero
- 2009 – Buka Coca-Cola, Buka Semangat Baru (Open Coca-Cola, Open Happiness)
- 2009 – Buka Semangat Baru (Open Happiness)
- 2010 – Segarkan Semangatmu (Refresh Your Spirit)
- 2015 – Nikmati Coca-Cola Bersama (Share a Coke)
- 2015 – Nikmati Segarnya Coca-Cola Bersama (Share a Coke)
- 2016 – Rasakan Momennya (Feel The Moment)
- 2017 – Coca-Cola Brrr... Rasakan Momennya (Coca-Cola Brrr... Feel The Moment)
- 2017 – Buka Momennya (Open The Moment)
- 2017 – Rasai Semangatnya
- 2020 – Hidupkan Semangatmu (Live on Your Spirit)
- 2020 – Hidupkan Rentakmu (Live Your Beat)
- 2020 – Bersama Berasa Lebih (Together Tastes Better)
- 2021 – Rasakan Keajaiban (Real Magic' or 'Feel The Magic)
- 2023 – Recipe for Magic

== Israel ==
- 1989 - כולנו מרגישים קוקה קולה (You Can't Beat the Feeling)
- 1994 - תמיד קוקה קולה (Always Coca-Cola)
- 2007 – לאהוב את החיים (Le'ehov et ha-chayim, Love the Life)
- 2016 – טעם החיים (Ta'am ha-chayim, The Taste of Life)
- 2021 – Real Magic
- 2023 – Recipe for Magic

== Italy ==
Coca-Cola was first imported into Italy in 1926.

- 1959 – Il miglior Ristoro (Coca-Cola refreshes you best)
- 1963 – Tutto va meglio con Coca Cola (Things go better with Coke)
- 1970 – Coca Cola da più vita (The Real Thing)
- 1982 – Coca-Cola di più (Coke is it)
- 1986 – Catch the Wave
- 1987 – Sensazione unica (You can't beat the feeling)
- 1993 – Sempre Coca-Cola (Always Coca-Cola)
- 2000 – Enjoy Coca-Cola
- 2001 – Life tastes good
- 2006 – Taste the coke side of life
- 2007 – Make every drop count
- 2008 – Vivi il lato Coca Cola della vita (Long live the Coca-Cola side of life)
- 2009 – Stappa la felicità (Open Happiness)
- 2009 – Vivi la musica e accendi l'estate (Experience music and light up the summer)
- 2010 – Buon appetito con Coca-Cola (Enjoy your meal with Coca-Cola)
- 2016 – Taste The Feeling
- 2021 – Real Magic
- 2023 – Recipe for Magic

== Japan ==
Coca-Cola was first sold in Japan in 1914 as an expensive import, but it did not start bottling there until 1957.

- 1957 – Skatto sawayaka (Very Refreshing)
- 1962 – スカッとさわやかコカ・コーラ (Sukattosawayaka koka kōra, Sparkling and refreshing Coca-Cola)
- 1971 - The Real Life
- 1976 – Come on in. (Drink) Coke.
- 1980 – Yes Coke Yes
- 1985 – Coke is it.
- 1987 – I feel Coke.
- 1991 – さわやかになるひととき。(Sawayaka ni naru hitotoki, A moment that refreshes)
- 1993 – Always Coca-Cola
- 1996 – Enjoy
- 2001 – No Reason
- 2004 – Special Magic
- 2006 – The Coke Side of Life
- 2010 – Open Happiness
- 2012 – Refreshing & Uplifting
- 2016 – Taste The Feeling
- 2021 – Real Magic
- 2023 – Recipe for Magic

== Latin America ==
- 1929 – La pausa que refresca (The Pause That Refreshes)
- 1944 – La Invitación Universal...¡Tomemos una CocaCola! (The Universal Invitation...Let's Drink a Coke!)
- 1952 – En Todas Partes...En Tan Deiciousa (Columbia)
- 1959 – Coca-Cola refresca mejor (Coca-Cola Refreshes You Best)
- 1963 – Todo va mejor con Coca-Cola (Things Go Better With Coke)
- 1969 – La chispa de la vida (The Spark of Life), translation of the "It's The Real Thing" campaign
- 1976 – Coca-Cola da más vida (Coke gives more life)
- 1979 – Coca-Cola y una sonrisa (Coke and a Smile)
- 1982 – Coca-Cola es asi / Coca-Cola, ¡Más y más! (Chile) (Coke is it)
- 1987 – Es sentir de verdad / Viva la sensación (Mexico) (You Can't Beat the Feeling)
- 1993 – Siempre Coca-Cola (Always Coca-Cola)
- 2000 – Vívela (Live It)
- 2003 – La vida sabe bien (Life Tastes Good)
- 2003 – Coca-Cola, de verdad (Coca-Cola, Real)
- 2006 – El lado Coca-Cola de la vida (The Coke Side of Life)
- 2008 – Desde 1886 repartiendo felicidad (Spreading Happiness since 1886)
- 2008 – El lado Coca-Cola de la vida (The Coke Side of Life)
- 2009 – Destapa la felicidad (Open Happiness)
- 2015 – Comparte una Coca-Cola (Share a Coke)
- 2016 – Siente El Sabor (Taste the Feeling)
- 2016 – Sentí el sabor (Feel the taste), in Argentina
- 2021 – Magia de verdad (Real Magic)
- 2023 – Somos Muchos (We are many), in Argentina, Chile, Colombia, and Mexico
- 2023 – Receta Mágica (Recipe for Magic)
- 2024 – Juntos en Todas (Together in every situation), in Argentina

== Pakistan ==
- Coca Cola Hi to hay jo sab ko khooshiyan dai (Only Coca Cola makes everyone happy)
- 2009 –Khulein Khushian (Open Happiness)
- Kha Le Pee Le Jee Le (Eat Drink Live)
- Aao mil kar khayen (Come Eat Together)
- Piyo Zara Jhoom K (Drink in Excitement)
- Maza Har Lamhe Ka (Fun of every Moment)
- Zaalima Coca-Cola Pila Dey (O Tyrant! Feed me Coca-Cola)
- 2017 – Tadını Çıkar (Taste The Feeling)
- 2021 – Real Magic
- 2023 – Recipe for Magic

== Philippines ==
Coca-Cola began bottling in the Philippines in 1938, its first expansion into Asia.

- 1952 – 25 Years of Service in the Philippines
- 1954 – Ice Cold Coca Cola
- 1971 – I'd Like To Buy The World A Coke
- 1976 – Coke Adds Life
- 1982 – Coke Is It!
- 1988 – Can't Beat The Feeling
- 1994 – Always Coca-Cola
- 1996 – Enjoy Coca Cola
- 1998 – Nothing refreshes like the real thing.
- 2001 – Buti na lang, nag Coca-Cola ka muna.
- 2003 – Coke Ko To!
- 2005 – Kasama ka.
- 2006 – Buhay Coke Buksan Mo!
- 2008 – Great Taste, Zero Sugar, for Coca-Cola Zero
- 2009 – Mag Smile Sa Buhay, Mag Coke Araw Araw!
- 2011 – Coke Mismo!
- 2012 – 100 Taon ng Saya Sa Coke!
- 2013 – Sino Napasaya Mo Today?
- 2014 – Breaktime is Coca-Cola Time
- 2014 – Share A Coke Sa Saya (Share a Coke)
- 2015 – Mag Coke Timeout Na!
- 2015 – Ngayong Pasko, Anong Wish Mong Moment?
- 2016 –Taste the Feeling
- 2020 – Together Tastes Better
- 2021 – Real Magic
- 2023 – Recipe for Magic

== Poland ==
- 1971 – Coca-Cola orzeźwia. (Coca-Cola refreshes)
- 1982 – Coca-Cola to jest to! – Agnieszka Osiecka (Coke is it!)
- 1993 – Zawsze Coca-Cola (Always Coca-Cola)
- 2000 – Coca-Cola: co za radość (Coca-Cola: such a joy) — part of international "Enjoy!" branding; created by Jerzy Bralczyk.
- 2007 – Witaj po radosnej stronie życia (Welcome to the Coke side of life)
- 2011 – Otwórz Szczęście (Open Happiness)
- 2017 – Spróbuj (Taste The Feeling)
- 2021 – Prawdziwa Magia (Real Magic)
- 2023 – Recipe for Magic

== Russia ==
- 1993 – Всегда Coca-Cola (Vsegda Coca Cola, Always Coca-Cola)
- 2010 – Coca-Cola идет в дом! (Coca Cola idet v dom!, Coca-Cola is going to the house!)
- 2011 – Открой Счастье (Otkroy Schast'ye, Open Happiness)
- Вливайся! (Vlivaisya)
- 2016 – Попробуй. Почувствуй! (Taste The Feeling)
- 2021 – Магия Момента (Magic Moments)
- 2021 – Real Magic
- 2023 – Recipe for Magic

== South Africa ==
- 2006 – The Coke Side of Life
- 2021 – Real Magic
- 2023 – Recipe for Magic

== Spain ==
- 1929 – La pausa que refresca (The Pause That Refreshes)
- 1959 – Coca-Cola refresca mejor (Coca-Cola Refreshes You Best)
- 1963 – Todo va mejor con Coca-Cola (Things Go Better With Coke)
- 1970 – La chispa de la vida (It's The Real Thing)
- 1976 – Coca-Cola da más vida (Coke adds life)
- 1982 – Coca-Cola es asi (Coke is it)
- 1987 – Sensación de vivir (You Can't Beat the Feeling)
- 1993 – Siempre Coca-Cola (Always Coca-Cola)
- 2000 – Vívela (Live It)
- 2003 – La vida sabe bien (Life Tastes Good)
- 2003 – Coca-Cola, de verdad (Coca-Cola, Real)
- 2006 – El lado Coca-Cola de la vida (The Coke Side of Life)
- 2008 – Desde 1886 repartiendo felicidad (Spreading happiness since 1886)
- 2008 – El lado Coca-Cola de la vida (The Coke Side of Life)
- 2009 – Destapa la felicidad (Open Happiness)
- 2016 – Siente El Sabor (Taste the Feeling)
- 2021 – Real Magic
- 2023 – Recipe for Magic
