= Gossip magazine =

Magazine usually focused on celebrity gossip

A gossip magazine is a magazine genre focused on gossip, scandal, and the personal lives of celebrities, public figures, and members of high society. In the United States, an early national weekly gossip tabloid was Broadway Brevities and Society Gossip, launched in New York in 1916. Originally covering high society and the New York theatre world, it increasingly emphasized scandal and sensationalized stories about sex, drugs, crime, and other forms of vice during its later incarnations.

Large-circulation gossip magazines were eventually displaced in part by supermarket tabloids such as the National Enquirer and by less scandal-oriented celebrity magazines such as People and Us, although smaller publications in the older scandal-focused tradition continued to appear. The genre has also extended beyond print into television and the Internet.

== History ==
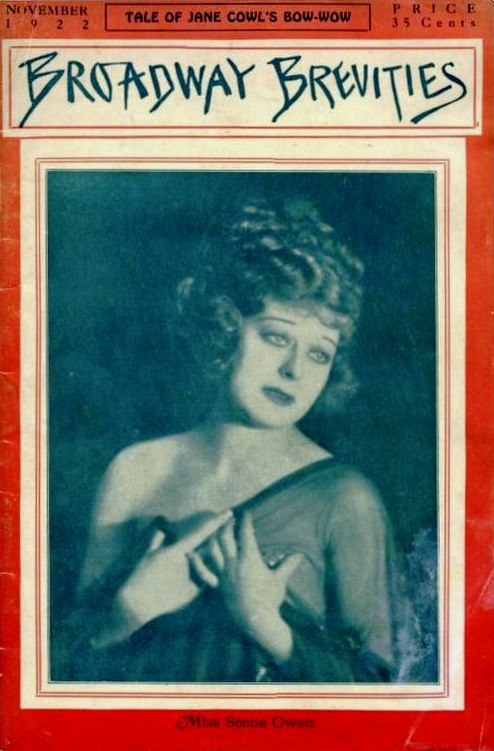
Actress Seena Owen, on the cover of the November 1922 Broadway Brevities

The publication generally credited as America's first national weekly gossip tabloid is Broadway Brevities and Society Gossip, (Note: Earlier gossip tabloids included Town Topics.) which was launched in New York in 1916 and edited by a Canadian named Stephen G. Clow. Brevities started out covering high society and the A-list of the New York theater world, but by the 1920s focused on society scandal and the destruction of reputations culminating in its editor, Stephen Clow, and two of his associates being charged with using the mails to defraud due to allegations that the magazine was a blackmail racket threatening to publish material injurious to the reputations of businesses and individuals unless they purchased advertising. The tabloid was consequently shut down in 1925 after Clow and his associates were convicted with Clow sentenced to six years in prison (serving two). Clow revived the tabloid in 1930 and the new incarnation covered more general vice and ran splashy, highly sensationalized features on sex, drugs, gang violence and crime. This was possibly the first time a gossip magazine had made real efforts to attract readers who weren't members of the elite classes; it didn't presume its readers had a close familiarity with any given social or professional world. In 1932, New York City banned newsstands from selling the racy tabloid, and it appears to have folded sometime around 1933. A third incarnation of the tabloid was printed in Toronto from 1937, with Clow as editor initially, until around 1948.

== Modern ==
The large-circulation gossip magazines eventually gave way to supermarket tabloids, such as the National Enquirer, and to less scandal-oriented celebrity coverage in magazines such as People and Us, though small-circulation publications that harken back to the 1950s approach have continued to be published. The history of gossip magazines also includes a few eccentric titles that flouted the usual rules of acceptable taste, such as the sexually explicit Hollywood Star of the 1970s. There are nearly 400 magazines related to gossip in the news stands.

Notable gossip magazines around the world include Us Weekly in the United States, Hello! in the United Kingdom, Gente and Chi in Italy, Actustar and Voici in France, Seiska in Finland, Bunte in Germany, and East Touch in Hong Kong.

The gossip genre has crossed over onto television and the internet with sites such as TMZ.com and its television counterpart TMZ on TV as well as Perez Hilton, The Drudge Report, and The Smoking Gun breaking many of the stories that were formerly the domain of gossip magazines and tabloids.

== See also ==
- Defamation
- Disinformation
- Gossip columnist
- Tabloid (newspaper format)
- Tabloid journalism
