= Tom Cruise filmography =

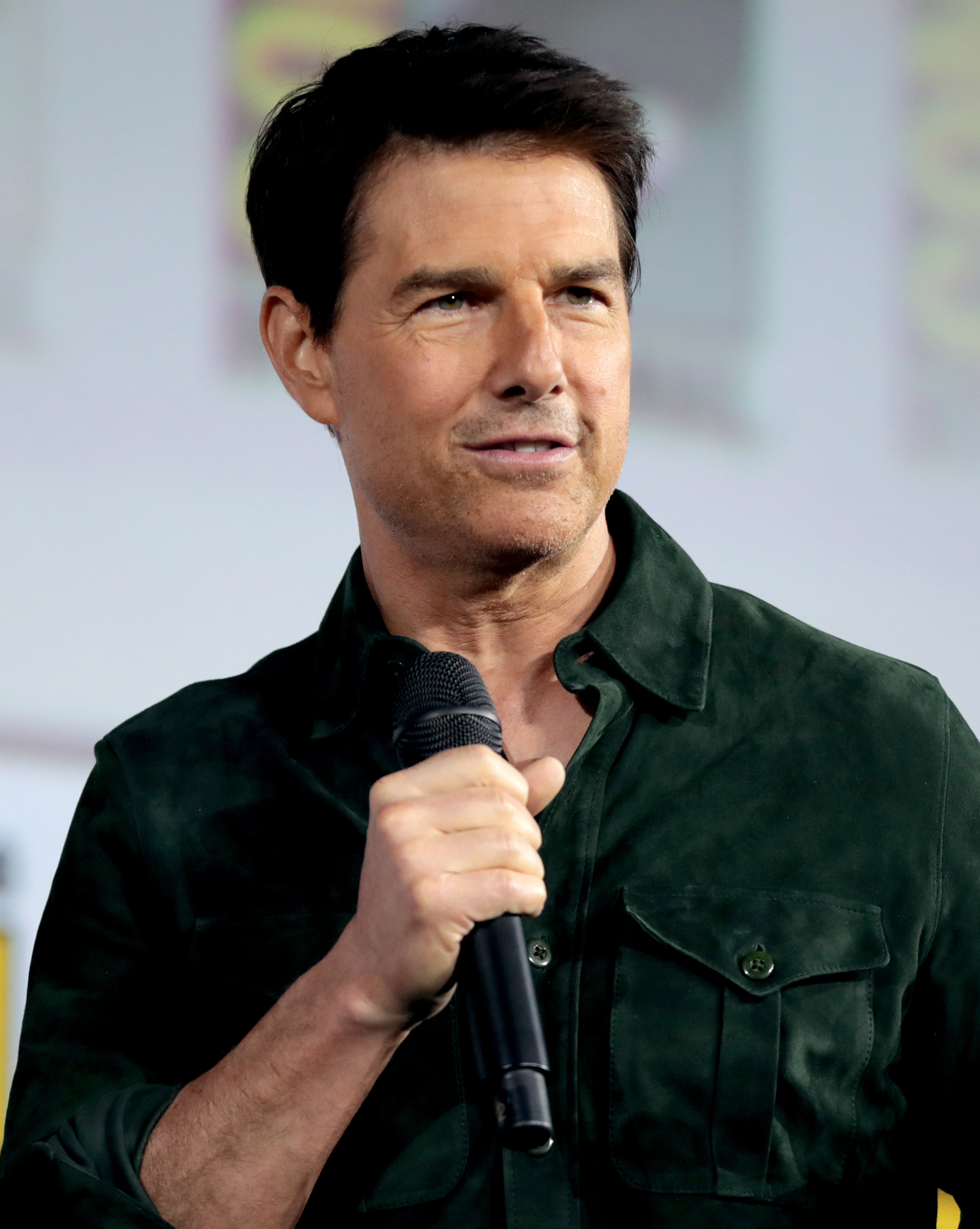
- Cruise in 2019

Tom Cruise is an American actor and producer who made his film debut with a minor role in the 1981 romantic drama Endless Love. He followed that with a supporting performance as Cadet Captain David Shawn in the 1981 military school drama, Taps. Two years later, he made his breakthrough by starring in the romantic comedy Risky Business (1983), which garnered his first nomination for the Golden Globe Award for Best Actor – Motion Picture Musical or Comedy. In 1985, he played Jack in the fantasy film Legend. In 1986, Cruise played a naval aviator in the Tony Scott-directed action drama Top Gun which was the highest-grossing film of the year, and also appeared with Paul Newman in the Martin Scorsese-directed drama The Color of Money. Two years later, he starred with Dustin Hoffman in the drama Rain Man (1988). His next role was as anti-war activist Ron Kovic in the film adaptation of Kovic's memoir of the same name, Born on the Fourth of July (1989), for which he received the Golden Globe Award for Best Actor – Motion Picture Drama.

In 1992 he starred opposite Jack Nicholson in the legal drama A Few Good Men, an adaptation of the Broadway play of the same name also written by Aaron Sorkin. Cruise next appeared in The Firm (1993), a film adaptation of the John Grisham legal thriller of the same name, and in the same year, also made his directorial debut by directing an episode of the anthology television series Fallen Angels. Cruise starred as spy Ethan Hunt in the action film Mission: Impossible (1996), the first project of his production company Cruise/Wagner Productions, which he had co-founded with Paula Wagner in 1993. As of 2025, Cruise has appeared in seven more films in the Mission: Impossible franchise: Mission: Impossible 2 (2000), Mission: Impossible III (2006), Mission: Impossible – Ghost Protocol (2011), Mission: Impossible – Rogue Nation (2015), Mission: Impossible – Fallout (2018), Mission: Impossible – Dead Reckoning Part One (2023), and Mission: Impossible – The Final Reckoning (2025).

He played the title role in the Cameron Crowe-directed comedy-drama Jerry Maguire (1996), which garnered Cruise the Golden Globe Award for Best Actor – Motion Picture Musical or Comedy. In 1999, Cruise starred in the Stanley Kubrick-directed erotic thriller Eyes Wide Shut opposite his then wife Nicole Kidman, and also appeared in the Paul Thomas Anderson-directed drama Magnolia. For the latter he received the Golden Globe Award for Best Supporting Actor – Motion Picture, and was also nominated for the Academy Award for Best Supporting Actor. Cruise reteamed with Crowe on the science fiction thriller Vanilla Sky (2001), which earned him a Saturn Award for Best Actor. The following year he starred in the Steven Spielberg-directed Minority Report (2002). In 2005, he collaborated again with Spielberg on War of the Worlds, and received the Stanley Kubrick Britannia Award for Excellence in Film from BAFTA Los Angeles. Three years later, he appeared in the satirical action comedy Tropic Thunder and played German army officer Claus von Stauffenberg in the historical thriller Valkyrie (both in 2008). In 2010, Cruise reunited with his Vanilla Sky co-star Cameron Diaz in the action comedy Knight and Day, followed by the action thriller Jack Reacher (2012), in which he starred in the title role and in its sequel Jack Reacher: Never Go Back (2016). He starred in Oblivion (2013), and Edge of Tomorrow (2014), both of which saw his return to the science fiction genre. He then played drug smuggler Barry Seal in the action comedy American Made (2017) and then in 2022, starred in and produced the action film sequel Top Gun: Maverick, which grossed $1.5 billion at the box-office and became his highest-grossing film.

== Film ==
Key
†	Denotes films that have not yet been released

Year	Title	Role	Notes	Ref(s)
1981	Endless Love	Billy		
1981	Taps	Capt. David Shawn		
1982	Losin' It	Woody		
1983	The Outsiders	Steve Randle		
1983	Risky Business	Joel Goodsen		
1983	All the Right Moves	Stefen "Stef" Djordjevic		
1985	Legend	Jack		
1986	Top Gun	Lt. Pete "Maverick" Mitchell		
1986	The Color of Money	Vincent Lauria		
1988	Cocktail	Brian Flanagan		
1988	Young Guns	Murphy's Henchman	Uncredited cameo	
1988	Rain Man	Charlie Babbitt		
1989	Born on the Fourth of July	Ron Kovic		
1990	Days of Thunder	Cole Trickle	Also story co-writer	
1992	Far and Away	Joseph Donelly		
1992	A Few Good Men	Lt. Daniel Kaffee		
1993	The Firm	Mitch McDeere		
1994	Interview with the Vampire	Lestat de Lioncourt		
1996	Mission: Impossible	Ethan Hunt	Also producer	
1996	Jerry Maguire	Jerry Maguire		
1999	Eyes Wide Shut	Dr. William Harford		
1999	Magnolia	Frank T.J. Mackey		
2000	Mission: Impossible 2	Ethan Hunt	Also producer	
2001	Stanley Kubrick: A Life in Pictures	Narrator	Documentary	
2001	Vanilla Sky	David Aames	Also producer	
2002	Space Station 3D	Narrator	Documentary	
2002	Minority Report	Chief John Anderton		
2002	Austin Powers in Goldmember	Himself as Austin Powers	Cameo	
2003	The Last Samurai	Nathan Algren	Also producer	
2004	Collateral	Vincent		
2005	War of the Worlds	Ray Ferrier		
2006	Mission: Impossible III	Ethan Hunt	Also producer	
2007	Lions for Lambs	Senator Jasper Irving		
2008	Tropic Thunder	Les Grossman		
2008	Valkyrie	Colonel Claus von Stauffenberg		
2010	Knight and Day	Roy Miller / Matthew Knight		
2011	Mission: Impossible – Ghost Protocol	Ethan Hunt	Also producer	
2012	Rock of Ages	Stacee Jaxx		
2012	Jack Reacher	Jack Reacher	Also producer	
2013	Oblivion	Jack Harper		
2014	Edge of Tomorrow	Major William "Bill" Cage		
2015	Mission: Impossible – Rogue Nation	Ethan Hunt	Also producer	
2016	Jack Reacher: Never Go Back	Jack Reacher	Also producer	
2017	The Mummy	Sgt. Nick Morton		
2017	American Made	Barry Seal		
2018	Mission: Impossible – Fallout	Ethan Hunt	Also producer	
2022	Top Gun: Maverick	Capt. Pete "Maverick" Mitchell	Also producer	
2023	Mission: Impossible – Dead Reckoning Part One	Ethan Hunt	Also producer	
2025	Mission: Impossible – The Final Reckoning	Ethan Hunt	Also producer	
2026	Digger	Digger Rockwell / Curtis Markson	Also producer	

=== Producer only ===
- Without Limits (1998)
- Suspect Zero (2004) (uncredited)
- Elizabethtown (2005)
- Ask the Dust (2006)

=== Executive producer only ===
- The Others (2001)
- Narc (2002)
- Shattered Glass (2003)

=== Camera operator only ===
- Star Wars: Starfighter (2027)

== Television ==
Year	Title	Role	Notes	Ref(s)
1993	Fallen Angels	—N/a	Director; Episode: "The Frightening Frammis"	
2002	The Art of Action: Martial Arts in Motion Picture	Narrator	Documentary	
2009	Together: The Hendrick Motorsports Story	Narrator	Documentary	
2010	Top Gear	Himself	Series 15, Episode 5	
2017	Spielberg	Himself	Documentary	
2024	Paris 2024 Olympics closing ceremony	Himself	Shows up in the Stade de France where the ceremony was held and in the pre-made video following afterwards for the LA 2028 handover segment	
2026	2026 FIFA World Cup closing ceremony	Himself		

== See also ==
- List of awards and nominations received by Tom Cruise
