= List of awards and nominations received by Tom Cruise =

Tom Cruise awards and nominations
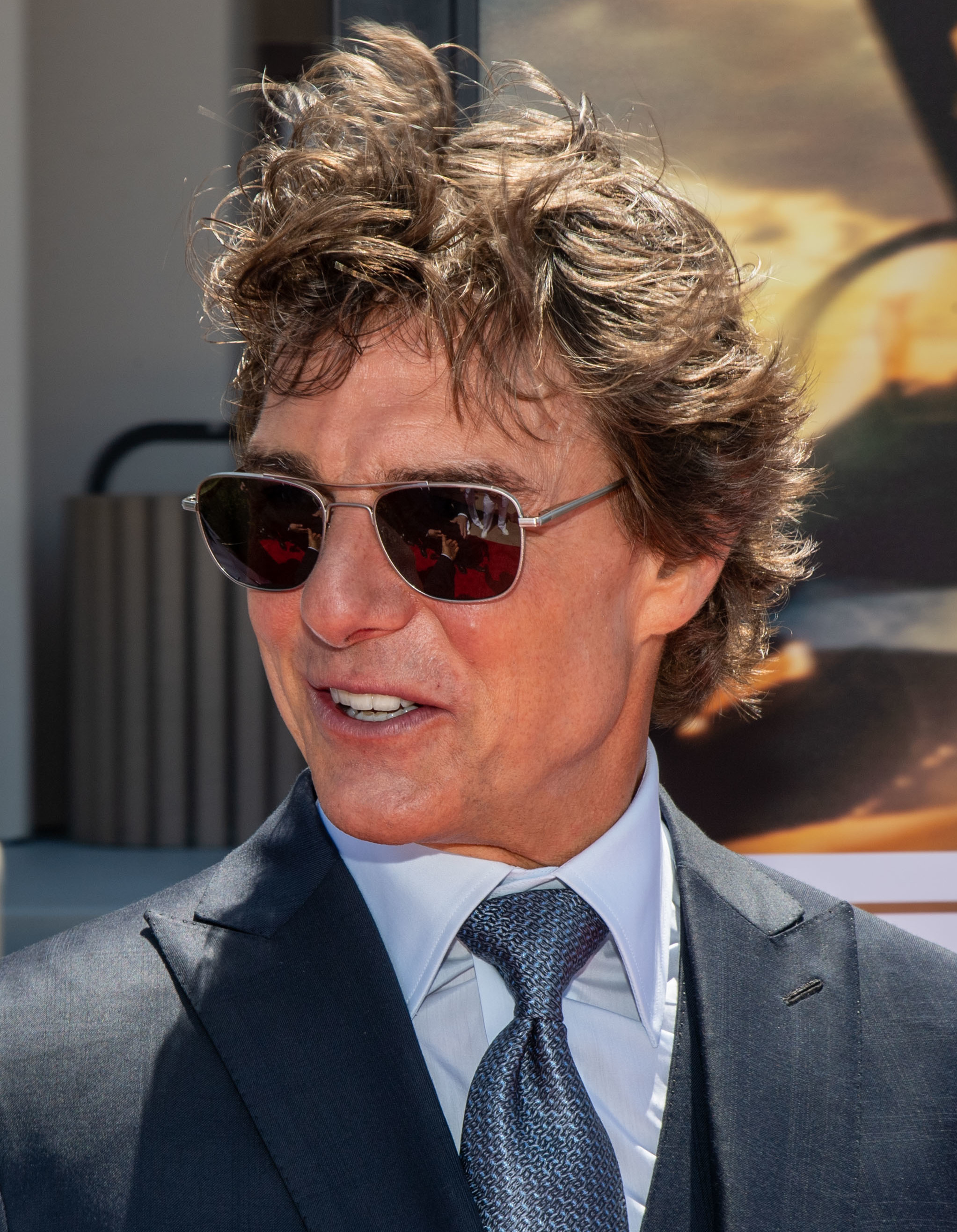
Awards and nominations
| Award | Wins | Nominations |
| Academy Awards | 0 | 4 |
| BAFTA Awards | 0 | 1 |
| Critics' Choice Awards | 3 | 7 |
| Golden Globe Awards | 3 | 8 |
| Screen Actors Guild Awards | 0 | 3 |

Totals (Note: Certain award groups do not simply award one winner. They acknowledge several different recipients, have runners-up, and have third place. Since this is a specific recognition and is different from losing an award, runner-up mentions are considered wins in this award tally. For simplification and to avoid errors, each award in this list has been presumed to have had a prior nomination.)
- Wins: 134
- Nominations: 419

The following article is a List of awards and nominations received by Tom Cruise.

Tom Cruise is an American actor known for his leading film roles. Over his career, he has received several awards, including three Golden Globe Awards as well as nominations for four Academy Awards, a BAFTA Award, and three Screen Actors Guild Awards. He was honored with a star on the Hollywood Walk of Fame in 1986, the Stanley Kubrick Britannia Award for Excellence in Film and the David Special in 2005, the Honorary Palme d'Or in 2022, and the BFI Fellowship in 2025.

Cruise was nominated for four Academy Awards for Best Actor playing Sergeant Ron Kovic in the biographical anti-war film Born on the Fourth of July (1989) and a sports agent in the romantic sports drama Jerry Maguire (1996) and Best Supporting Actor playing a chauvinist motivational speaker in the epic drama Magnolia (1999). He was also nominated as a producer on the action drama Top Gun: Maverick (2022).

He won the Golden Globe Award for Best Actor in a Motion Picture – Drama for Born on the Fourth of July (1989), the Golden Globe Award for Best Actor in a Motion Picture – Musical or Comedy for Jerry Maguire, and the Golden Globe Award for Best Supporting Actor – Motion Picture for Magnolia (1999). He was Globe-nominated for playing a high school student in the coming-of-age comedy Risky Business (1983), a lawyer in the legal drama in A Few Good Men (1992), a soldier in the epic The Last Samurai (2003), profane studio executive in the war comedy Tropic Thunder (2008), and Pete "Maverick" Mitchell in the action film Top Gun: Maverick (2022).

He won the David O. Selznick Achievement Award in Theatrical Motion Pictures from the Producers Guild of America Awards in 2023. He received three Screen Actors Guild Award nominations for Jerry Maguire (1996) and Magnolia (1999). He received three Critics' Choice Super Awards for Best Actor in an Action Film for Top Gun: Maverick (2022), Mission: Impossible – Dead Reckoning (2023), and Mission: Impossible – The Final Reckoning (2025).

== Major associations ==
=== Academy Awards ===
| Year | Category | Nominated work | Result | Ref. |
|---|---|---|---|---|
| 1990 | Best Actor | Born on the Fourth of July | Nominated | |
| 1997 | Best Actor | Jerry Maguire | Nominated | |
| 2000 | Best Supporting Actor | Magnolia | Nominated | |
| 2023 | Best Picture | Top Gun: Maverick | Nominated | |
| 2026 | Academy Honorary Award | | Honored | |

=== American Film Institute ===
| Year | Category | Work | Result | Ref. |
|---|---|---|---|---|
| 2027 | AFI Life Achievement Award † | —N/a | Honored | |

=== BAFTA Award ===
| Year | Category | Nominated work | Result | Ref. |
British Academy Film Awards
| 1991 | Best Actor in a Leading Role | Born on the Fourth of July | Nominated | |

=== Critics' Choice Awards ===
| Year | Category | Nominated work | Result | Ref. |
Critics' Choice Movie Awards
| 1997 | Best Actor | Jerry Maguire | Nominated | |
| 2015 | Best Actor in an Action Movie | Edge of Tomorrow | Nominated | |
| 2016 | Best Actor in an Action Movie | Mission: Impossible – Rogue Nation | Nominated | |
| 2023 | Best Actor | Top Gun: Maverick | Nominated | |
Critics' Choice Super Awards
| 2023 | Best Actor in an Action Movie | Top Gun: Maverick | Won | |
| 2024 | Best Actor in an Action Movie | Mission: Impossible – Dead Reckoning Part One | Won | |
| 2025 | Best Actor in an Action Movie | Mission: Impossible – The Final Reckoning | Won | |

=== Golden Globe Awards ===
On May 10, 2021, Cruise returned all three of his Golden Globes to the Hollywood Foreign Press Association due to its many controversies, particularly for its lack of diversity, specifically no black members, and ethical questions related to financial benefits to some of its members.

| Year | Category | Nominated work | Result | Ref. |
|---|---|---|---|---|
| 1984 | Best Actor – Motion Picture Musical or Comedy | Risky Business | Nominated | |
| 1990 | Best Actor – Motion Picture Drama | Born on the Fourth of July | Won | |
| 1993 | Best Actor – Motion Picture Drama | A Few Good Men | Nominated | |
| 1997 | Best Actor – Motion Picture Musical or Comedy | Jerry Maguire | Won | |
| 2000 | Best Supporting Actor – Motion Picture | Magnolia | Won | |
| 2004 | Best Actor – Motion Picture Drama | The Last Samurai | Nominated | |
| 2009 | Best Supporting Actor – Motion Picture | Tropic Thunder | Nominated | |
| 2023 | Best Motion Picture – Drama (Note: As a producer) | Top Gun: Maverick | Nominated | |

=== Screen Actors Guild Awards ===
| Year | Category | Nominated work | Result | Ref. |
|---|---|---|---|---|
| 1997 | Outstanding Actor in a Leading Role | Jerry Maguire | Nominated | |
| 2000 | Outstanding Actor in a Supporting Role | Magnolia | Nominated | |
| 2000 | Outstanding Ensemble Cast in a Motion Picture | Magnolia | Nominated | |

== Miscellaneous awards ==
| Organizations | Year | Category | Project | Result | Ref. |
|---|---|---|---|---|---|
| David di Donatello Awards | 1990 | Best Foreign Actor (Migliore Attore Straniero) | Born on the Fourth of July | Nominated | |
| Empire Awards | 2000 | Best Actor | Eyes Wide Shut | Nominated | |
| Empire Awards | 2003 | Best Actor | Minority Report | Won | |
| Empire Awards | 2005 | Best Actor | Collateral | Nominated | |
| Golden Raspberry Awards | 1989 | Worst Actor | Cocktail | Nominated | |
| Golden Raspberry Awards | 1995 | Worst Screen Couple (Note: Shared with Brad Pitt and tied with Sylvester Stallone and Sharon Stone in The Specialist) | Interview with the Vampire | Won | |
| Golden Raspberry Awards | 2001 | Worst Remake or Sequel | Mission: Impossible 2 | Nominated | |
| Golden Raspberry Awards | 2006 | Most Tiresome Tabloid Targets | Tom Cruise, Katie Holmes, Oprah Winfrey's couch, the Eiffel Tower, and "Tom's baby" | Won | |
| Golden Raspberry Awards | 2006 | Most Tiresome Tabloid Targets | Tom Cruise and his anti-psychiatry rant | Nominated | |
| Golden Raspberry Awards | 2006 | Worst Actor | War of the Worlds | Nominated | |
| Golden Raspberry Awards | 2018 | Worst Actor | The Mummy | Won | |
| Hasty Pudding Theatricals Awards | 1994 | Hasty Pudding Man of the Year | | Won | |
| MTV Movie & TV Awards | 1993 | Best On-Screen Duo (Note: Shared with Nicole Kidman) | Far and Away | Nominated | |
| MTV Movie & TV Awards | 1993 | Most Desirable Male | A Few Good Men | Nominated | |
| MTV Movie & TV Awards | 1993 | Best Male Performance | A Few Good Men | Nominated | |
| MTV Movie & TV Awards | 1994 | Most Desirable Male | The Firm | Nominated | |
| MTV Movie & TV Awards | 1994 | Best Male Performance | The Firm | Nominated | |
| MTV Movie & TV Awards | 1995 | Best Villain | Interview with the Vampire | Nominated | |
| MTV Movie & TV Awards | 1995 | Best On-Screen Duo (Note: Shared with Brad Pitt) | Interview with the Vampire | Nominated | |
| MTV Movie & TV Awards | 1995 | Most Desirable Male | Interview with the Vampire | Nominated | |
| MTV Movie & TV Awards | 1997 | Best Male Performance | Jerry Maguire | Won | |
| MTV Movie & TV Awards | 2001 | Best Male Performance | Mission: Impossible 2 | Won | |
| MTV Movie & TV Awards | 2004 | Best Male Performance | The Last Samurai | Nominated | |
| MTV Movie & TV Awards | 2005 | Generation Award | —N/a | Won | |
| MTV Movie & TV Awards | 2005 | Best Villain | Collateral | Nominated | |
| MTV Movie & TV Awards | 2012 | Best Fight | Mission: Impossible – Ghost Protocol | Nominated | |
| MTV Movie & TV Awards | 2012 | Best Gut-Wrenching Performance | Mission: Impossible – Ghost Protocol | Nominated | |
| MTV Movie & TV Awards | 2023 | Best Performance in a Movie | Top Gun: Maverick | Won | |
| MTV Movie & TV Awards | 2023 | Best Hero | Top Gun: Maverick | Nominated | |
| MTV Movie & TV Awards | 2023 | Best Duo (Note: Shared with Miles Teller) | Top Gun: Maverick | Nominated | |
| MTV Movie Awards – Mexico | 2004 | Funniest American in Japan | The Last Samurai | Won | |
| MTV TRL Awards | 2003 | Biggest Friggin Star to Ever Appear on TRL Award | —N/a | Won | |
| Nickelodeon Kids' Choice Awards | 1997 | Favorite Movie Actor | Mission: Impossible | Nominated | |
| Nickelodeon Kids' Choice Awards | 2001 | Favorite Movie Actor | Mission: Impossible 2 | Nominated | |
| Nickelodeon Kids' Choice Awards | 2001 | Wannabe Award | —N/a | Won | |
| Nickelodeon Kids' Choice Awards | 2012 | Favorite Butt Kicker | Mission: Impossible – Ghost Protocol | Nominated | |
| Nickelodeon Kids' Choice Awards | 2023 | Favorite Movie Actor | Top Gun: Maverick | Nominated | |
| People's Choice Awards | 1987 | Favorite Motion Picture Actor | N/A | Nominated | |
| People's Choice Awards | 1990 | Favorite Motion Picture Actor | N/A | Won | |
| People's Choice Awards | 1994 | Favorite Actor in a Dramatic Motion Picture | The Firm | Won | |
| People's Choice Awards | 2004 | Favorite Male Movie Star | N/A | Nominated | |
| People's Choice Awards | 2017 | Favorite Movie Icon | N/A | Nominated | |
| People's Choice Awards | 2018 | Male Movie Star of 2018 | Mission: Impossible – Fallout | Nominated | |
| People's Choice Awards | 2018 | Action Movie Star of 2018 | Mission: Impossible – Fallout | Nominated | |
| People's Choice Awards | 2022 | Male Movie Star of 2022 | Top Gun: Maverick | Nominated | |
| People's Choice Awards | 2022 | Action Movie Star of 2022 | Top Gun: Maverick | Nominated | |
| People's Choice Awards | 2024 | The Male Movie Star of the Year | Mission: Impossible – Dead Reckoning Part One | Nominated | |
| People's Choice Awards | 2024 | The Action Movie Star of the Year | Mission: Impossible – Dead Reckoning Part One | Nominated | |
| Producers Guild of America Awards | 1997 | Most Promising Producer in Theatrical Motion Pictures | Mission: Impossible | Won | |
| Producers Guild of America Awards | 2004 | Outstanding Producer of Theatrical Motion Pictures | The Last Samurai | Nominated | |
| Producers Guild of America Awards | 2023 | Outstanding Producer of Theatrical Motion Pictures | Top Gun: Maverick | Nominated | |
| Rembrandt Award | 2012 | Best International Actor (Beste Buitenlandse Acteur) | Mission: Impossible – Ghost Protocol | Nominated | |
| Satellite Awards | 1997 | Best Actor in a Motion Picture – Comedy or Musical | Jerry Maguire | Won | |
| Satellite Awards | 2000 | Best Actor in a Supporting Role – Drama | Magnolia | Nominated | |
| Satellite Awards | 2004 | Best Actor in a Motion Picture – Drama | The Last Samurai | Nominated | |
| Satellite Awards | 2023 | Best Actor in a Motion Picture – Drama | Top Gun: Maverick | Nominated | |
| Saturn Awards | 1995 | Best Actor | Interview with the Vampire | Nominated | |
| Saturn Awards | 2002 | Best Actor | Vanilla Sky | Won | |
| Saturn Awards | 2003 | Best Actor | Minority Report | Nominated | |
| Saturn Awards | 2004 | Best Actor | The Last Samurai | Nominated | |
| Saturn Awards | 2005 | Best Actor | Collateral | Nominated | |
| Saturn Awards | 2006 | Best Actor | War of the Worlds | Nominated | |
| Saturn Awards | 2007 | Best Actor | Mission: Impossible III | Nominated | |
| Saturn Awards | 2009 | Best Actor | Valkyrie | Nominated | |
| Saturn Awards | 2012 | Best Actor | Mission: Impossible – Ghost Protocol | Nominated | |
| Saturn Awards | 2015 | Best Actor | Edge of Tomorrow | Nominated | |
| Saturn Awards | 2019 | Best Actor | Mission: Impossible – Fallout | Nominated | |
| Saturn Awards | 2022 | Best Actor | Top Gun: Maverick | Won | |
| Saturn Awards | 2026 | Best Actor | Mission: Impossible – The Final Reckoning | Won | |
| ShoWest Convention | 1987 | Special Award | Box Office Star of the Year | Won | |
| Teen Choice Awards | 2000 | Choice Movie Actor | Mission: Impossible 2 | Nominated | |
| Teen Choice Awards | 2000 | Choice Summer Movie Wipeout | Mission: Impossible 2 | Nominated | |
| Teen Choice Awards | 2005 | Choice Movie Villain | Collateral | Nominated | |
| Teen Choice Awards | 2005 | Choice Movie Actor – Drama | Collateral | Nominated | |
| Teen Choice Awards | 2006 | Choice Movie Actor – Action | Mission: Impossible III | Nominated | |
| Teen Choice Awards | 2012 | Choice Movie Actor – Action | Mission: Impossible – Ghost Protocol | Nominated | |
| Teen Choice Awards | 2013 | Choice Movie Actor – Sci-Fi/Fantasy | Oblivion | Nominated | |
| Teen Choice Awards | 2014 | Choice Movie Actor – Action | Edge of Tomorrow | Nominated | |
| Yoga Awards | 1994 | Worst Foreign Actor | The Firm | Won | |

== Honorary awards ==
| Organizations | Year | Notes | Result | Ref. |
|---|---|---|---|---|
| American Cinema Awards | 1991 | Distinguished Achievement in Film | Honored | |
| Taormina Film Fest | 2000 | Career Award | Honored | |
| Scientology | 2004 | Freedom Medal of Valor | Honored | |
| British Academy Britannia Awards | 2005 | Stanley Kubrick Britannia Award for Excellence in Film | Honored | |
| Broadcast Film Critics Association | 2005 | Distinguished Career Achievement in Performing Arts Award | Honored | |
| David di Donatello | 2005 | Lifetime Achievement Award (David Special) | Honored | |
| Hubert Burda Media | 2007 | Bambi Courage Award | Honored | |
| Living Legends of Aviation | 2010 | Top Aviation Inspiration and Patriotism Award | Honored | |
| National Movie Awards | 2010 | Screen Icon Award | Honored | |
| Empire Awards | 2014 | Empire 25th Award: Legend of our Lifetime | Honored | |
| Will Rogers Motion Picture Pioneers Foundation | 2018 | Pioneer of the Year Award | Honored | |
| Cannes Film Festival | 2022 | Honorary Palme d'Or | Honored | |
| Producers Guild of America Award | 2023 | David O. Selznick Achievement Award | Honored | |
| Aero Club of France | 2025 | Great Medal (Note: For his "significant contribution to the history of aviation and inspiring future pilots".) | Honored | |
| British Film Institute | 2025 | BFI Fellowship | Honored | |
| Governors Awards | 2025 | Academy Honorary Award for Lifetime Achievement | Honored | |

== State honors ==
Name of country, year given, and name of honor
| Country | Year | Honor | Ref. |
|---|---|---|---|
| France | 2005 | Medal of Honorary Citizen of Marseille | |
| France | 2022 | Honorary Member of the Patrol of France by French Air and Space Force | |
| France | 2024 | Knight of the Order of Arts and Letters by the Government of France | |
| Ireland | 2013 | Certificate of Irish Heritage from the Department of Foreign Affairs | |
| South Korea | 2013 | Honorary Citizen of Busan | |
| United States | 1986 | Star on Hollywood Walk of Fame (Motion Picture category) | |
| United States | 2020 | US Navy's 36th Honorary Naval Aviator | |
| United States | 2024 | US Navy's Distinguished Public Service Award | |

== See also ==
- Tom Cruise filmography
- Living Legends of Aviation
