= Hollywood Star =

Hollywood Star Magazine, vol. 1 no. 1, 1979.

The Hollywood Star was an idiosyncratic gossip tabloid published on an erratic schedule in Hollywood, California by William Kern, who wrote much of the magazine under the pseudonym "Bill Dakota." Published in a newspaper format (and sold in newsracks), it appeared in 1976, and had stopped publishing by 1981. In 1979, it adopted a smaller magazine format which lasted two issues, as Hollywood "Confidential" Star Magazine. The Hollywood Star had a homosexual subtext (Kern's other mid-1970s paper was called Gayboy) and printed nude photos and sexually oriented gossip.
