= Paul Rubell =

American film editor (born 1952)

- Born: September 6, 1952 (age 73); Los Angeles, California, United States
- Occupation: Film editor

Paul Rubell is an American film editor. His career spans 42 years in both film and television.

== Education ==
Rubell obtained his bachelor's degree in English literature from the University of California, Los Angeles.

== Career ==
Rubell worked for a time with editor Lou Lombardo. His first editing credit was for the film The Final Terror (1983). He worked for about ten years on films and programming for television before returning to feature films as the editor for The Island of Dr. Moreau.

Rubell has been elected to membership in the American Cinema Editors.

== Awards ==
- 1989 nominated for an Emmy for My Name is Bill W.
- 1990 nominated for an Eddie Award for Best Edited Television Special for My Name is Bill W.
- 1996 nominated for an Eddie Award for Best Edited Motion Picture for Non-Commercial Television for The Burning Season
- 1996 nominated for an Emmy for Andersonville
- 1997 won the Eddie Award for Best Edited Episode from a Television Mini-Series for Andersonville (episode 2)
- 2000 nominated for a Satellite Award for Best Editing for The Insider
- 2000 nominated for an Eddie Award for Best Edited Feature Film - Dramatic for The Insider
- 2000 nominated for an Academy Award for Best Film Editing for The Insider
- 2005 won the Satellite Award for Best Editing for Collateral
- 2005 nominated for BAFTA Award for Best Editing for Collateral
- 2005 nominated for an Eddie Award for Best Edited Feature Film - Dramatic for Collateral
- 2005 nominated for an Academy Award for Film Editing for Collateral

== Filmography ==
Year	Film	Director	Other notes
1983	The Final Terror	Andrew Davis	Co-edited with Erica Flaum
1984	The Stone Boy	Christopher Cain	—
1992	Ruby Cairo	Graeme Clifford	Co-edited with Caroline Biggerstaff and Mark Winitsky
1996	The Island of Dr. Moreau	John Frankenheimer	Co-edited with Adam P. Scott and Thom Noble(uncredited)
1998	Blade	Stephen Norrington	—
1999	The Insider	Michael Mann	Co-edited with David Rosenbloom and William Goldenberg; First collaboration with Michael Mann
2000	The Cell	Tarsem Singh	Co-edited with Robert Duffy
2002	XXX	Rob Cohen	Co-edited with Chris Lebenzon and Joel Negron
2002	Simone	Andrew Niccol	—
2003	The League of Extraordinary Gentlemen	Stephen Norrington	—
2003	Peter Pan	P. J. Hogan	Additional editor
2004	Collateral	Michael Mann	Co-edited with Jim Miller; Second collaboration with Michael Mann
2005	The Island	Michael Bay	Co-edited with Christian Wagner; Additional editing by John Murray, Roger Barton and Tom Muldoon; First collaboration with Michael Bay
2006	Miami Vice	Michael Mann	Co-edited with William Goldenberg; Third collaboration with Michael Mann
2007	Transformers	Michael Bay	Co-edited with Glen Scantlebury and Tom Muldoon; Second collaboration with Michael Bay
2008	Hancock	Peter Berg	Co-edited with Colby Parker Jr.
2009	Public Enemies	Michael Mann	Co-edited with Jeffrey Ford; Fourth collaboration with Michael Mann
2009	Transformers: Revenge of the Fallen	Michael Bay	Co-edited with Joel Negron, Tom Muldoon and Roger Barton; Third collaboration with Michael Bay
2011	Thor	Kenneth Branagh	—
2012	The Avengers	Joss Whedon	Additional editor
2012	Battleship	Peter Berg	Co-edited with Billy Rich and Colby Parker Jr.
2014	Need for Speed	Scott Waugh	Co-edited with Scott Waugh
2014	Transformers: Age of Extinction	Michael Bay	Co-edited with Roger Barton and William Goldenberg; Fourth collaboration with Michael Bay
2014	Seventh Son	Sergei Bodrov	Co-edited with Jim Page and Michael Kahn
2016	The 5th Wave	J Blakeson	—
2017	The Fate of the Furious	F. Gary Gray	Co-edited with Christian Wagner
2018	Bumblebee	Travis Knight	—
2025	The Lost Bus	Paul Greengrass	Co-edited with William Goldenberg and Peter M. Dudgeon
2026	Masters of the Universe	Travis Knight	
