= Tom Cruise =

American actor and film producer (born 1962)

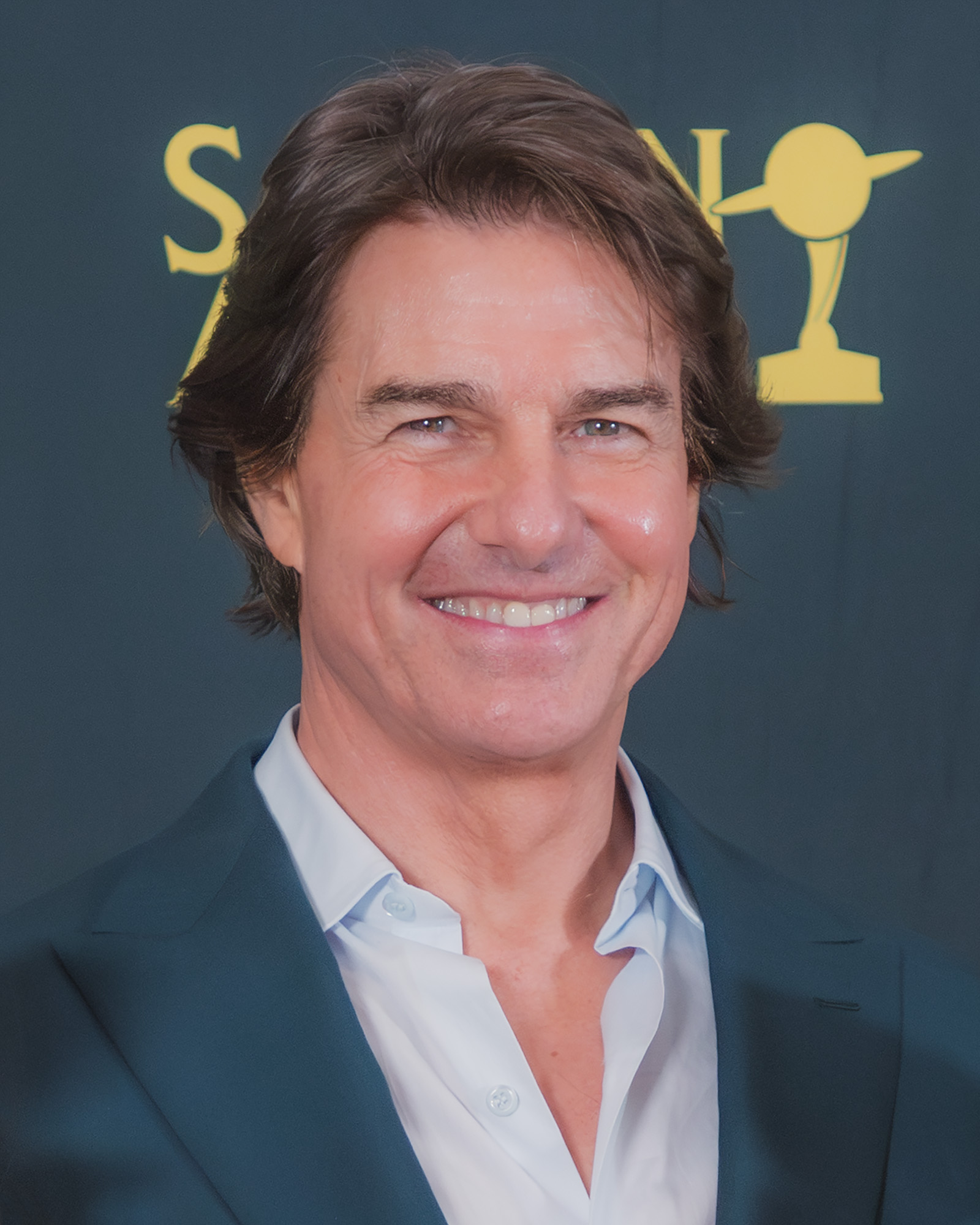
- Cruise in 2026
- Born: Thomas Cruise Mapother IV; July 3, 1962 (age 64); Syracuse, New York, U.S.
- Occupations: Actor; film producer
- Years active: 1981–present
- Works: Filmography
- Spouses: Mimi Rogers (m. 1987; div. 1990) Nicole Kidman (m. 1990; div. 2001) Katie Holmes (m. 2006; div. 2012)
- Children: 3
- Relatives: William Mapother (cousin)
- Awards: Full list
- Website: tomcruise.com

Thomas Cruise Mapother IV (/ˈmeɪˌpɒθər/; born July 3, 1962) is an American actor and film producer. His accolades include an Honorary Palme d'Or, an Academy Honorary Award, and three Golden Globe Awards, as well as nominations for four competitive Academy Awards. Considered to be a Hollywood icon and one of its most bankable stars, Cruise's films have grossed over $13.3 billion worldwide, making him one of the highest-grossing and highest-paid actors of all time.

Cruise began acting in the early 1980s and made his breakthrough with leading roles in Risky Business (1983) and Top Gun (1986), the latter earning him a reputation as a sex symbol. Critical acclaim came with his roles in the dramas The Color of Money (1986), Rain Man (1988), and Born on the Fourth of July (1989). For his portrayal of Ron Kovic in the latter, he won a Golden Globe Award and was nominated for the Academy Award for Best Actor. As a leading Hollywood star in the 1990s, he starred in commercially successful films, including the drama A Few Good Men (1992), the thriller The Firm (1993), the horror film Interview with the Vampire (1994), and the sports comedy-drama Jerry Maguire (1996); for the latter, he won a Golden Globe Award for Best Actor and his second nomination for the Academy Award for Best Actor. Cruise's performance in the drama Magnolia (1999) earned him another Golden Globe Award and nomination for the Academy Award for Best Supporting Actor.

Cruise subsequently established himself as a star of science fiction and action films, often performing his own risky stunts. He played fictional agent Ethan Hunt in the Mission: Impossible film series (1996–2025). His other films in the genre include Vanilla Sky (2001), Minority Report (2002), The Last Samurai (2003), Collateral (2004), War of the Worlds (2005), Knight and Day (2010), Jack Reacher (2012), Oblivion (2013), Edge of Tomorrow (2014), and Top Gun: Maverick (2022).

Cruise holds the Guinness World Record for the most consecutive $100 million-grossing movies, with eleven such films released between 2012 and 2025. In December 2024, he was awarded the U.S. Navy's highest civilian honor, the Distinguished Public Service Award, in recognition of his "outstanding contributions" to the military with his screen roles. In March 2025, he was named the recipient of the British Film Institute Fellowship, the BFI's highest honor, for his contributions to cinema. He is set to receive the AFI Life Achievement Award in 2027. Forbes ranked him the world's most powerful celebrity in 2006. He was named People's Sexiest Man Alive in 1990, and received the top honor of "Most Beautiful People" in 1997. Cruise has been an outspoken advocate for the Church of Scientology, which has resulted in controversy and scrutiny of his involvement in the organization. An aviation enthusiast, he has held a pilot certificate since 1994.

== Early life and education ==
Cruise was born on July 3, 1962, in Syracuse, New York, to special education teacher Mary Lee (née Pfeiffer; 1936–2017) and Thomas Cruise Mapother III (1934–1984). Mapother was an electrical engineer. His parents were both from Louisville, Kentucky, and had English, German, and Irish ancestry. Cruise has two older sisters, Lee Anne and Marian, and a younger sister, Cass. One of his cousins, William Mapother, is also an actor and has appeared alongside Cruise in five films.

Cruise grew up in near poverty and had a Catholic upbringing. He later called his father "a merchant of chaos", a "bully", and a "coward" who beat his children: "[My father] was the kind of person where, if something goes wrong, they kick you. It was a great lesson in my life—how he'd lull you in, make you feel safe and then, bang! For me, it was like, 'There's something wrong with this guy. Don't trust him. Be careful around him.'" Cruise's father died of cancer in 1984.

In total, Cruise attended fifteen schools in fourteen years. He spent part of his childhood in Canada; when his father took a job as a defense consultant with the Canadian Armed Forces, his family moved in late 1971 to Beacon Hill, Ottawa. He attended the new Robert Hopkins Public School for his fourth and fifth grade education. He first became involved in drama in fourth grade, under drama teacher George Steinburg. He and six other boys put on an improvised play to music called IT at the Carleton Elementary School drama festival. Drama organizer Val Wright was in the audience and later said that "the movement and improvisation were excellent ... a classic ensemble piece."

In sixth grade, Cruise went to Henry Munro Middle School in Ottawa. That year, his mother left his father, taking Cruise and his sisters back to the United States. In 1978 she married Jack South. Cruise briefly took a Catholic church scholarship and attended St. Francis Seminary in Cincinnati. He aspired to become a priest in the Franciscan order but left after a year. Priests at the seminary have said Cruise chose to leave the school when his family relocated again, but a former classmate said that they were both asked to leave after getting caught taking liquor. In his senior year of high school, he played football for the varsity team as a linebacker, but was cut from the squad after getting caught drinking beer before a game. He went on to star in the school's production of Guys and Dolls. In 1980, he graduated from Glen Ridge High School in Glen Ridge, New Jersey.

== Acting career ==
=== 1980s: Breakthrough and stardom ===
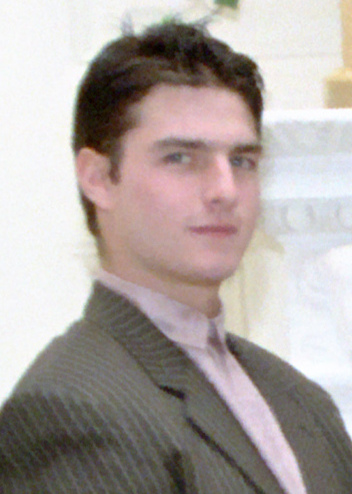
Cruise in 1985 at a reception hosted by First Lady Nancy Reagan at the White House

At age 18, with the blessing of his mother and stepfather, Cruise moved to New York City to pursue an acting career. After working as a busboy in New York, he went to Los Angeles to try out for television roles. He signed with CAA and began acting in films. He made his film debut in a bit part in the 1981 film Endless Love, followed by a major supporting role as a crazed military academy student in Taps later that year. Cruise was originally supposed to appear as a background actor but his role was expanded after he impressed director Harold Becker. He next won the role of Steve Randle in Francis Ford Coppola's 1983 adaptation of S. E. Hinton's novel The Outsiders, and shared the screen with an ensemble cast that included Matt Dillon, Emilio Estevez, Leif Garrett, C. Thomas Howell, Diane Lane, Rob Lowe, Ralph Macchio, and Patrick Swayze. Also in 1983, he appeared in All the Right Moves and Risky Business, which has been called "a Generation X classic, and a career maker for Tom Cruise." He played the male lead in the Ridley Scott film Legend, released in 1985. By 1986's Top Gun, his status as a superstar had been cemented.

Cruise followed up Top Gun with Martin Scorsese's The Color of Money (1986), which came out the same year, and which paired him with Paul Newman. Their chemistry won praise among critics, with The Washington Post writing, "One of the subtle achievements of both Cruise's and Newman's performances is that you feel that both of them are genuinely top-notch pool hustlers". In 1988, Cruise starred in Cocktail, a film that was a box-office success but panned by critics. His performance earned him a nomination for the Razzie Award for Worst Actor. Later that year he starred with Dustin Hoffman in Barry Levinson's Rain Man, which won the Academy Award for Best Picture.

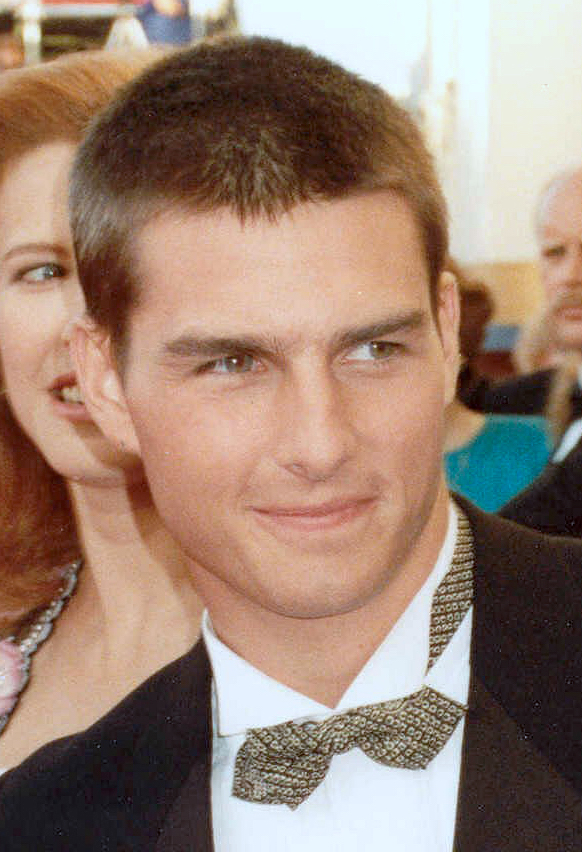
Tom Cruise at the 61st Academy Awards in 1989

In 1989, Cruise portrayed paralyzed Vietnam War veteran Ron Kovic in Oliver Stone's war epic Born on the Fourth of July. Film critic Roger Ebert of the Chicago Sun-Times wrote: "Nothing Cruise has done will prepare you for what he does in Born on the Fourth of July ... His performance is so good that the movie lives through it. Stone is able to make his statement with Cruise's face and voice and doesn't need to put everything into the dialogue." The performance earned him a Golden Globe Award for Best Actor – Motion Picture Drama, the Chicago Film Critics Association Award for Best Actor, the People's Choice Award for Favorite Motion Picture Actor, a nomination for BAFTA Award for Best Actor in a Leading Role, and Cruise's first Best Actor Academy Award nomination.

=== 1990s: Dramatic roles ===
Cruise's next films were Days of Thunder (1990) and Far and Away (1992), both of which co-starred then-wife Nicole Kidman as his love interest, followed by the legal thriller The Firm, a critical and commercial success. In 1994, Cruise starred with Brad Pitt, Antonio Banderas, and Christian Slater in Neil Jordan's Interview with the Vampire, a gothic drama/horror film based on Anne Rice's best-selling novel. The film was well-received, although Rice initially criticized the casting of Cruise, as Julian Sands was her first choice. Upon seeing the film, she paid $7,740 (equivalent to $16,813 in 2025) for a two-page ad in Daily Variety praising his performance and apologizing for her doubts about him.

In 1996, Cruise starred as superspy Ethan Hunt in the reboot of Mission: Impossible, which he also produced. The film was directed by Brian De Palma and was a box-office success. Film critic Stephen Holden of The New York Times praised Cruise's performance, writing, "Tom Cruise has found the perfect superhero character on which to graft his breathlessly gung-ho screen personality." The same year, Cruise had the title role in Cameron Crowe's sports drama Jerry Maguire, playing a sports agent in search of love. The film was a massive financial success, grossing more than $273 million worldwide against its $50 million budget.

In 1999, Cruise co-starred with Kidman in Stanley Kubrick's erotic and psychological drama film Eyes Wide Shut. Peter Bradshaw of The Guardian praised both of their performances, writing, "Cruise in particular lays himself open in that fiercely committed way that he tries everything as an actor". Also in 1999, Cruise took a rare supporting role, as motivational speaker Frank T. J. Mackey in Paul Thomas Anderson's Magnolia. Rolling Stone film critic Peter Travers heaped praise on Cruise, writing, "Cruise is a revelation, fully deserving of the shower of superlatives coming his way ... Cruise seethes with the chaotic energy of a wounded animal—he's devastating." For his performance he received another Golden Globe and nomination for an Academy Award.

=== 2000s: Established career ===
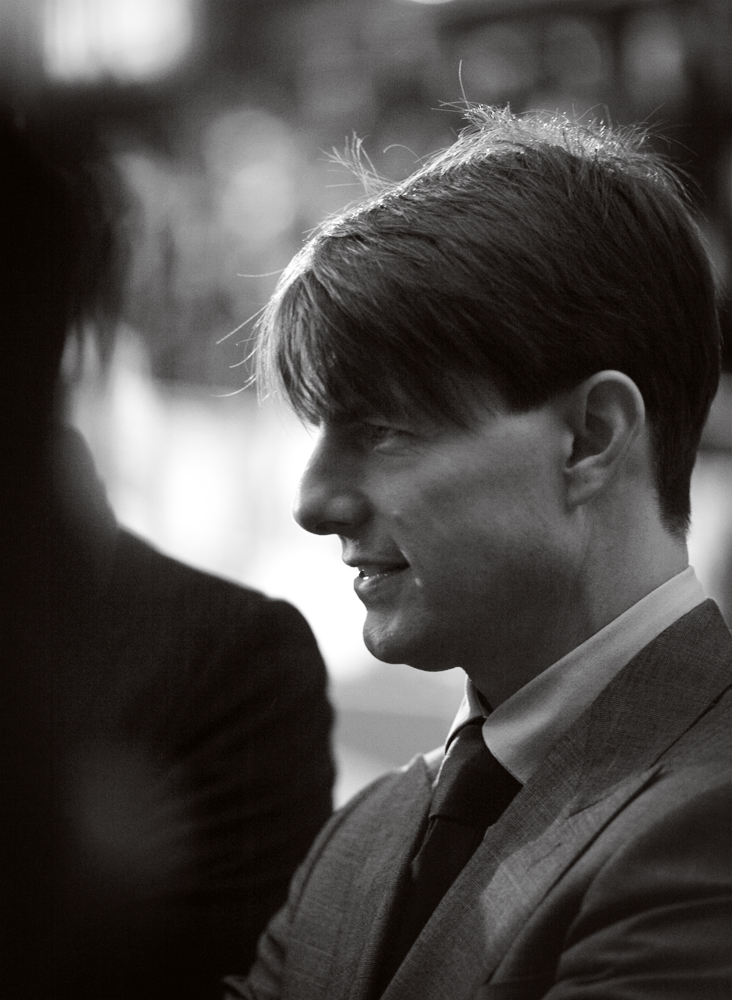
Cruise at the 2007 London Film Festival for the premiere of Lions for Lambs

In 2000, Cruise returned as Ethan Hunt in the second installment of the Mission: Impossible films, Mission: Impossible 2. The film was helmed by Hong Kong director John Woo and branded with his gun fu style; it continued the series' success at the box office, taking in $547 million worldwide. Unlike its predecessor, it was the highest-grossing film of the year but had a mixed critical reception. Cruise received an MTV Movie Award for Best Male Performance for the film. His next five films were major critical and commercial successes. The next year, Cruise starred in the romantic thriller Vanilla Sky with Cameron Diaz and Penélope Cruz. In 2002, he starred in the dystopian science fiction action film Minority Report, directed by Steven Spielberg and based on the short story by Philip K. Dick. It has been included on lists of the greatest science fiction films of all time.

In 2003, he starred in Edward Zwick's period action drama The Last Samurai, for which he received a Golden Globe nomination for Best Actor in a Motion Picture – Drama. In 2004, Cruise received critical acclaim for his performance as Vincent in Collateral. The critical consensus reads, "Driven by director Michael Mann's trademark visuals and a lean, villainous performance from Tom Cruise, Collateral is a stylish and compelling noir thriller." In 2005, Cruise worked with Spielberg again in War of the Worlds, a loose adaptation of H. G. Wells's novel of the same name, which was the year's fourth highest-grossing film, at $591.4 million worldwide. Also in 2005, he was a nominee for the People's Choice Award for Favorite Male Movie Star and won the MTV Generation Award. Cruise was nominated for seven Saturn Awards between 2002 and 2009, winning once. Nine of the ten films he starred in during the decade made more than $100 million at the box office.

In 2006, he returned to his role as Ethan Hunt in Mission: Impossible III. The film was more positively received by critics than the previous films in the series and grossed nearly $400 million at the box office. In 2007, Cruise took a supporting role for the second time in Lions for Lambs, a commercial disappointment. This was followed by an appearance as Les Grossman in the 2008 comedy Tropic Thunder with Ben Stiller, Jack Black, and Robert Downey Jr. The performance earned Cruise a Golden Globe nomination. Cruise played the central role in the historical thriller Valkyrie, released on December 25, 2008, to box-office success.

=== 2010s: Action star ===
In March 2010, Cruise completed filming the action-comedy Knight and Day, in which he re-teamed with Cameron Diaz; the film was released on June 23, 2010. On February 9, 2010, Cruise confirmed that he would star in Mission: Impossible – Ghost Protocol, the fourth installment in the series. It was released in December 2011 to high critical acclaim and box-office success. Unadjusted for ticket price inflation, it was Cruise's biggest commercial success to that date.

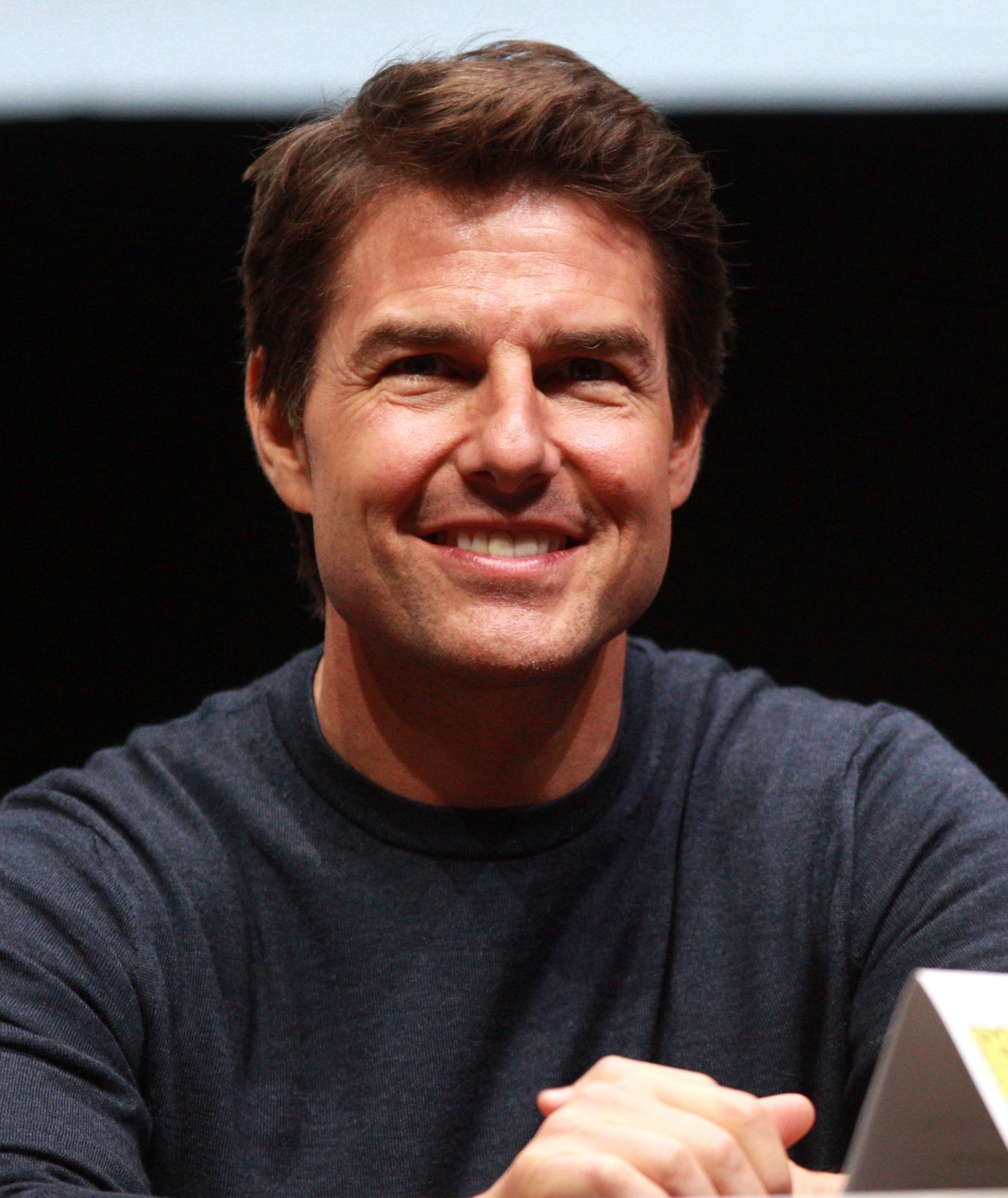
Cruise at the 2013 San Diego Comic Con

On May 6, 2011, Cruise received a humanitarian award from the Simon Wiesenthal Center and its Museum of Tolerance for his work as a dedicated philanthropist. In mid-2011, Cruise started shooting Rock of Ages, in which he plays the fictional character Stacee Jaxx. The film was released in June 2012 and was a rare box-office misstep for Cruise, but he received positive reviews, with Variety's film critic Justin Chang writing, "Channeling the likes of Axl Rose and Keith Richards with his tattoos, heavy furs and even heavier eyeshadow, Cruise clearly relishes the opportunity to play against type even as he sends up his world's-biggest-movie-star identity, displaying a cock-of-the-rock strut that viewers haven't seen since his turn in Magnolia."

Cruise starred as Jack Reacher in the film adaptation of British author Lee Child's 2005 novel One Shot. The film was released on December 21, 2012. It met with positive reviews from critics and was a box-office success, grossing $217 million worldwide. In 2013, he starred in the science fiction film Oblivion based on director Joseph Kosinski's graphic novel of the same name. The film met with mixed reviews and grossed $286 million worldwide. It also starred Morgan Freeman and Olga Kurylenko. In 2014, Cruise starred in the science fiction-action film Edge of Tomorrow, which received positive reviews and grossed more than $370 million.

In 2015, Cruise returned as Ethan Hunt in the fifth installment of the Mission: Impossible series, Mission: Impossible – Rogue Nation, which he also produced. Returning cast members included Simon Pegg as Benji and Jeremy Renner as William Brandt. Christopher McQuarrie directed. The film earned high critical acclaim and was a commercial success. Cruise starred in the 2017 reboot of Boris Karloff's 1932 horror movie The Mummy. The new film, also titled The Mummy, received poor reviews and disappointed at the box office, though still grossing more than $400 million. In 2018, Cruise again reprised Ethan Hunt, in the sixth film in his franchise, Mission: Impossible – Fallout. The film was more positively received by critics than the previous films in the series and grossed more than $791 million at the box office. Unadjusted for ticket price inflation, it was Cruise's biggest commercial success to date.

=== 2020s: Franchise films ===
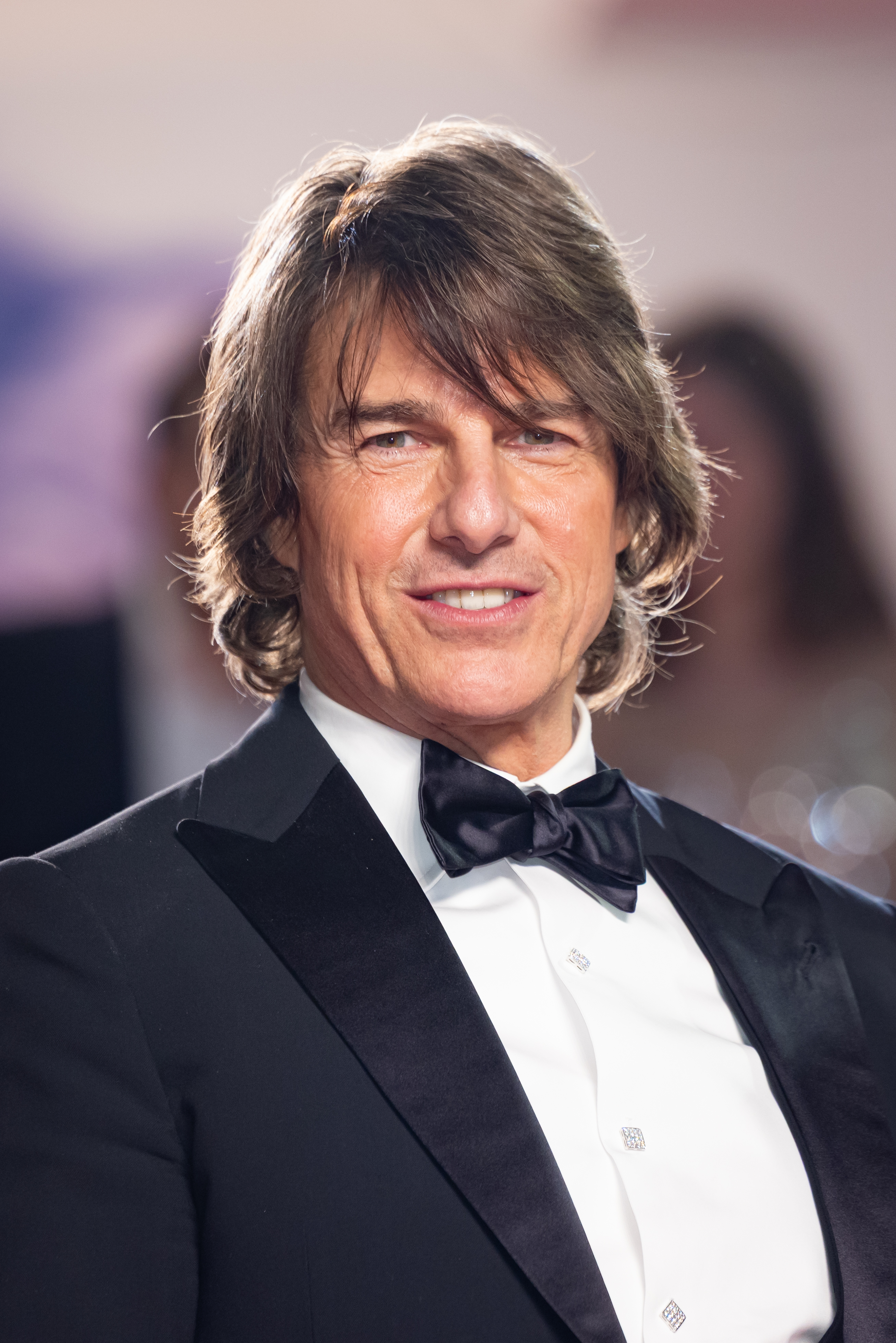
Cruise at the 2025 Cannes Film Festival

In May 2020, it was reported that Cruise will star in and produce a movie shot in outer space. Doug Liman will direct, write, and co-produce. Both will fly to the International Space Station as part of a future Axiom Space mission in a SpaceX Dragon 2 spacecraft. In May 2021, Cruise protested the Hollywood Foreign Press Association (HFPA) by returning all three of his Golden Globe Awards in light of controversy surrounding the HFPA, particularly its lack of diversity, specifically no black members, and ethical questions related to financial benefits to some of its members.

In 2022, Cruise reprised his role as Pete "Maverick" Mitchell in Top Gun: Maverick, a film he also produced. The film premiered at the Cannes Film Festival, where Cruise received an Honorary Palme d'Or. It was released to widespread critical praise, with many reviewers deeming it superior to its predecessor. The film broke several box-office records, earning more than $1 billion and becoming the highest-grossing film of Cruise's career. Cruise earned $100 million for the film, when combining ticket sales, his salary, and his cut of home entertainment rentals and streaming revenues.

Cruise reprised his role as Ethan Hunt in Mission: Impossible – Dead Reckoning Part One, released in theaters on July 12, 2023. The film received critical acclaim, but was a box-office disappointment, in large part due to the Barbenheimer phenomenon involving the concurrent releases of Christopher Nolan's biopic Oppenheimer and Greta Gerwig's fantasy comedy Barbie. Peter Debruge of Variety praised Dead Reckoning's performances, action sequences, and ending, writing, "This outing may be one-half of a two-part finale, but it gives audiences enough closure to stand on its own". In 2024, to promote the Los Angeles 2028 Summer Olympics, Cruise jumped from the roof of the Stade de France stadium during the Paris Olympics closing ceremony. He took the flag from Mayor Karen Bass and athlete Simone Biles.

Cruise reprised the role of Ethan Hunt in Mission: Impossible – The Final Reckoning, released in May 2025. He said it would be the last film in which he would portray the character. In 2026, he starred in Digger, a black comedy film directed by Alejandro González Iñárritu and Cruise's first film at Warner Bros. Pictures in 12 years. The film polarized critics and was a box office bomb.

== Production ==
TC Productions
- Type: Film production company
- Industry: Film
- Predecessor: Cruise/Wagner Productions
- Founded: 2008; 18 years ago
- Founder: Tom Cruise
- Headquarters: United States
- Owner: Tom Cruise

Cruise partnered with his former talent agent Paula Wagner to form Cruise/Wagner Productions in 1993, and the company has since co-produced several of Cruise's films, the first being Mission: Impossible in 1996 which was also Cruise's first project as a producer. In addition, Cruise has produced films in which he does not appear, namely The Others, Shattered Glass, Elizabethtown, Narc, Ask the Dust, and Without Limits.

Cruise is noted as having negotiated some of the most lucrative film deals in Hollywood and was described in 2005 by Hollywood economist Edward Jay Epstein as "one of the most powerful—and richest—forces in Hollywood." Epstein argues that Cruise is one of the few producers (the others being George Lucas, Steven Spielberg and Jerry Bruckheimer) who are regarded as able to guarantee the success of a billion-dollar film franchise. Epstein also contends that the public obsession with Cruise's tabloid controversies obscures full appreciation of Cruise's exceptional commercial prowess.

=== Break with Paramount ===
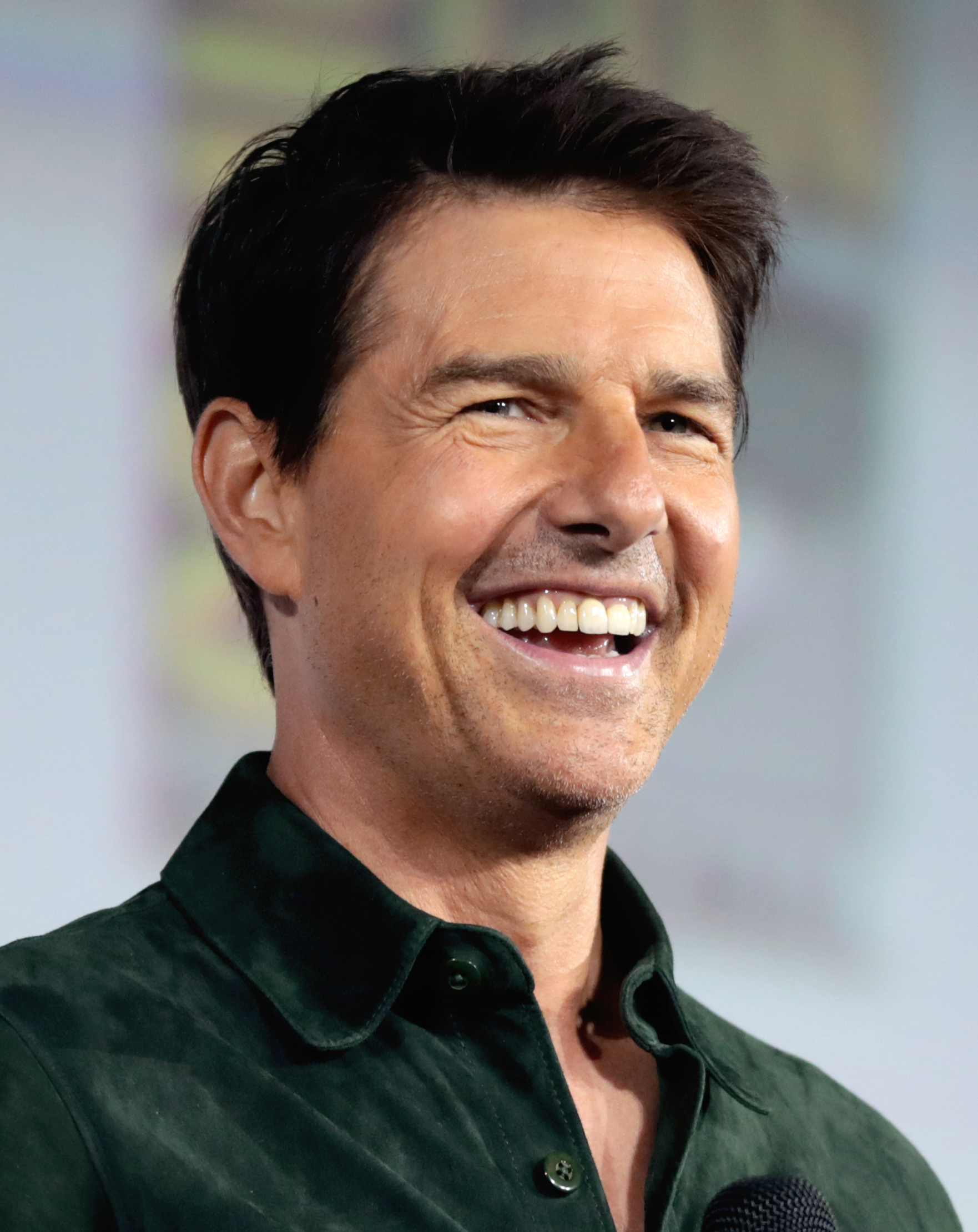
Cruise at the 2019 San Diego Comic-Con

On August 22, 2006, Paramount Pictures announced it was ending its 14-year relationship with Cruise. In The Wall Street Journal, chairman of Viacom (Paramount's parent company) Sumner Redstone cited the economic damage to Cruise's value as an actor and producer from his controversial public behavior and views. Cruise/Wagner Productions responded that Paramount's announcement was a face-saving move after the production company had successfully sought alternative financing from private equity firms. Industry analysts such as Edward Jay Epstein commented that the real reason for the split was most likely Paramount's discontent over Cruise/Wagner's exceptionally large share of DVD sales from the Mission: Impossible franchise.

=== Management of United Artists ===
In November 2006, Cruise and Paula Wagner announced that they had taken over the film studio United Artists (UA). Cruise acted as a producer and starred in films for UA, while Wagner served as UA's chief executive. Production began in 2007 of Valkyrie, a thriller based on the July 20, 1944, assassination attempt against Adolf Hitler. The film was acquired in March 2007 by UA. On March 21, 2007, Cruise signed to play Claus von Stauffenberg, the protagonist. This project marked the second production to be greenlighted since Cruise and Wagner took control of UA. The first was its inaugural film, Lions for Lambs, directed by Robert Redford and starring Redford, Meryl Streep and Cruise. In August 2008, Wagner stepped down from her position at UA; she retained her stake in UA, which combined with Cruise's share amounted to 30% of the studio.

=== Return to Paramount ===
Cruise began working with Paramount again as a producer and star with Mission: Impossible – Ghost Protocol, without Wagner, which was a critical and commercial success. He and Wagner collaborated for the last time on the modestly successful Jack Reacher series, also for Paramount.

=== Move to Warner Bros. Discovery ===
In January 2024, it was announced that TC Productions was forming a new strategic partnership with Warner Bros. Discovery to develop and produce original and franchise films.

== Acting credits and accolades ==
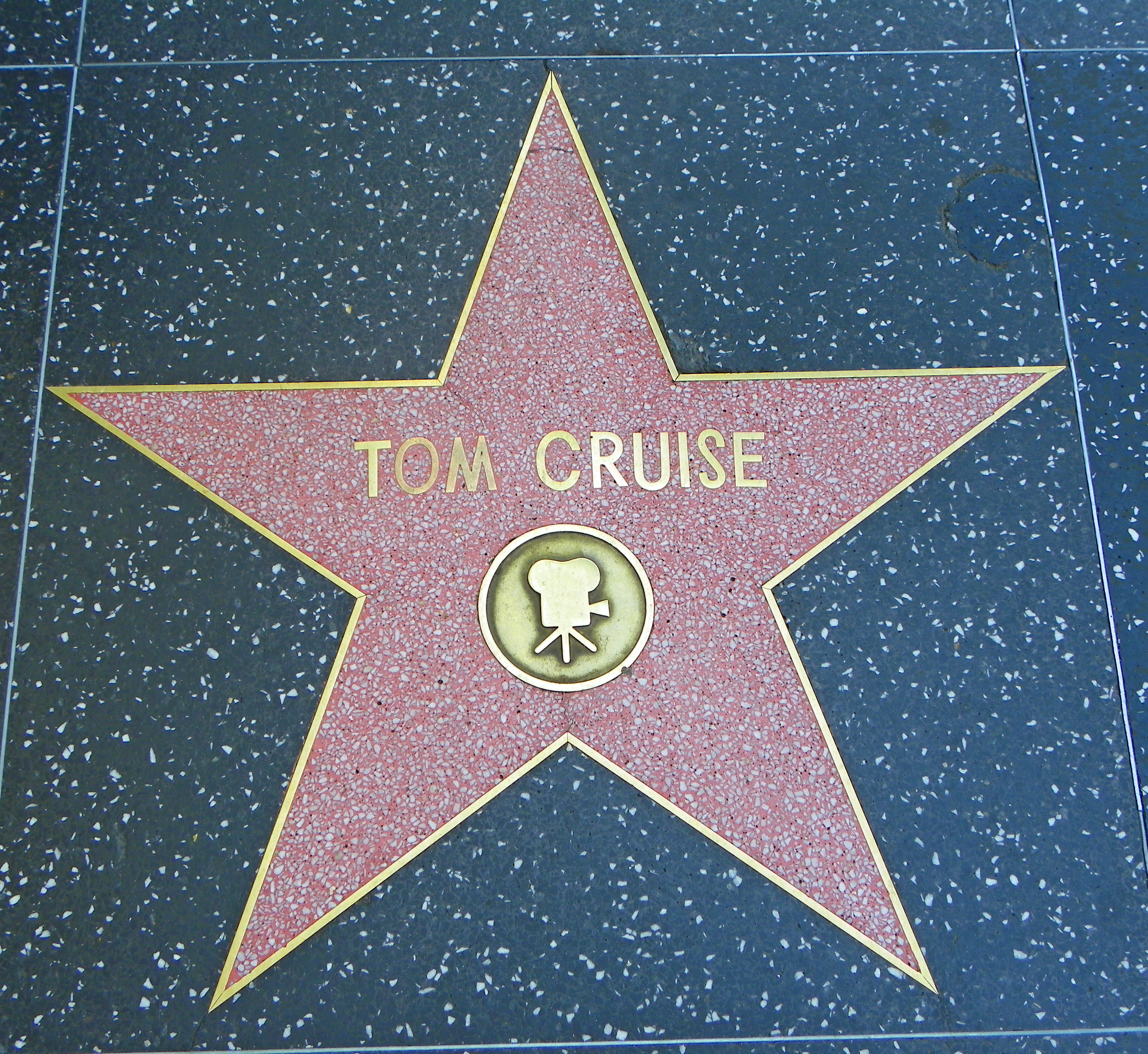
Cruise's star on the Hollywood Walk of Fame

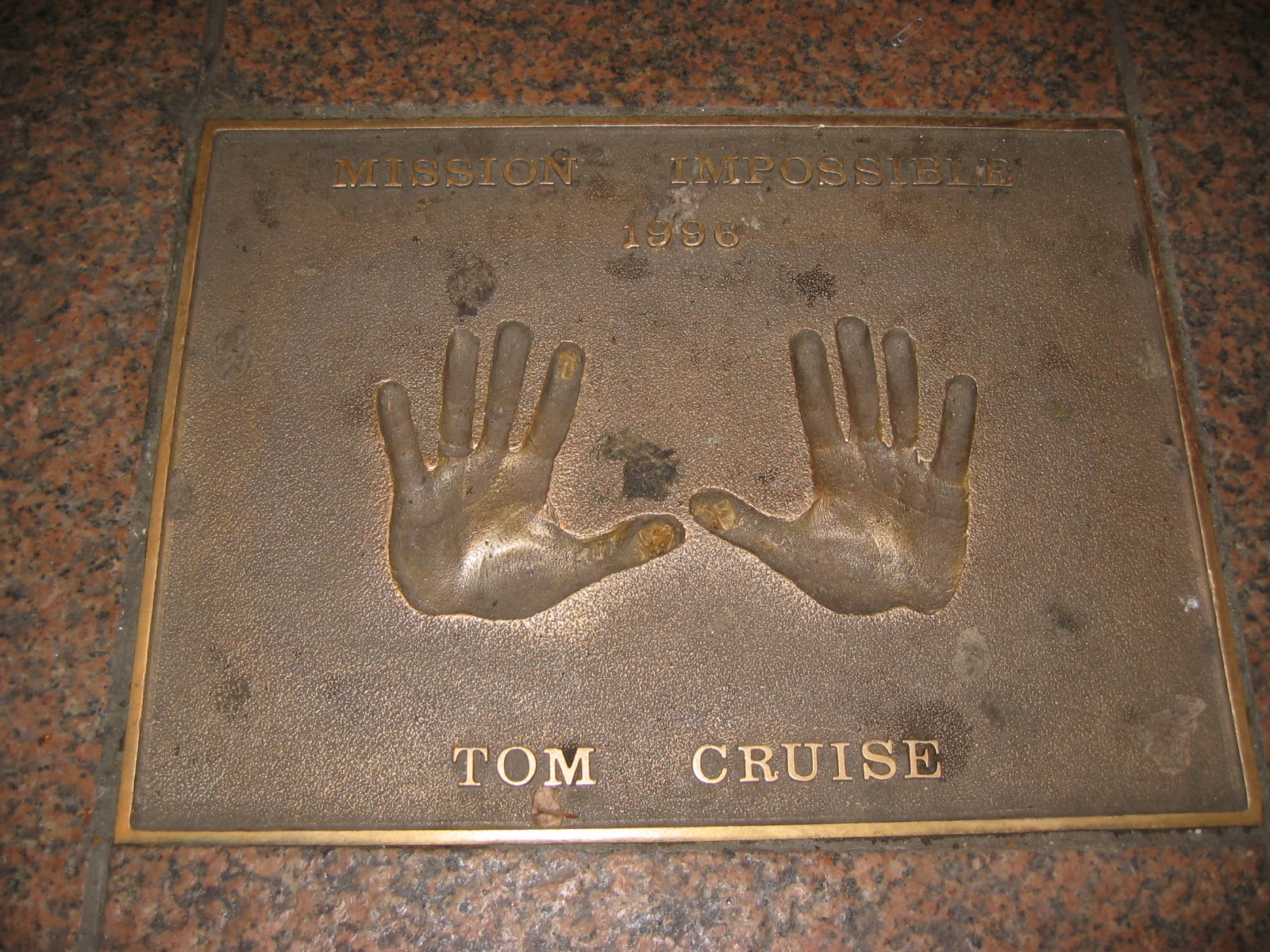
Cruise's handprints in Leicester Square, London

In 2006, Premiere ranked Cruise as Hollywood's most powerful actor, as Cruise was 13th on the magazine's 2006 Power List, the highest-ranked actor. The same year, Forbes magazine named him the world's most powerful celebrity. In 2016, the founder of CinemaScore named Cruise and Leonardo DiCaprio as the "two stars, it doesn't matter how bad the film is, they can pull [the box office] up." October 10, 2006, was declared "Tom Cruise Day" in Japan; the Japan Memorial Day Association said he was given a special day because of "his love for and close association with Japan".

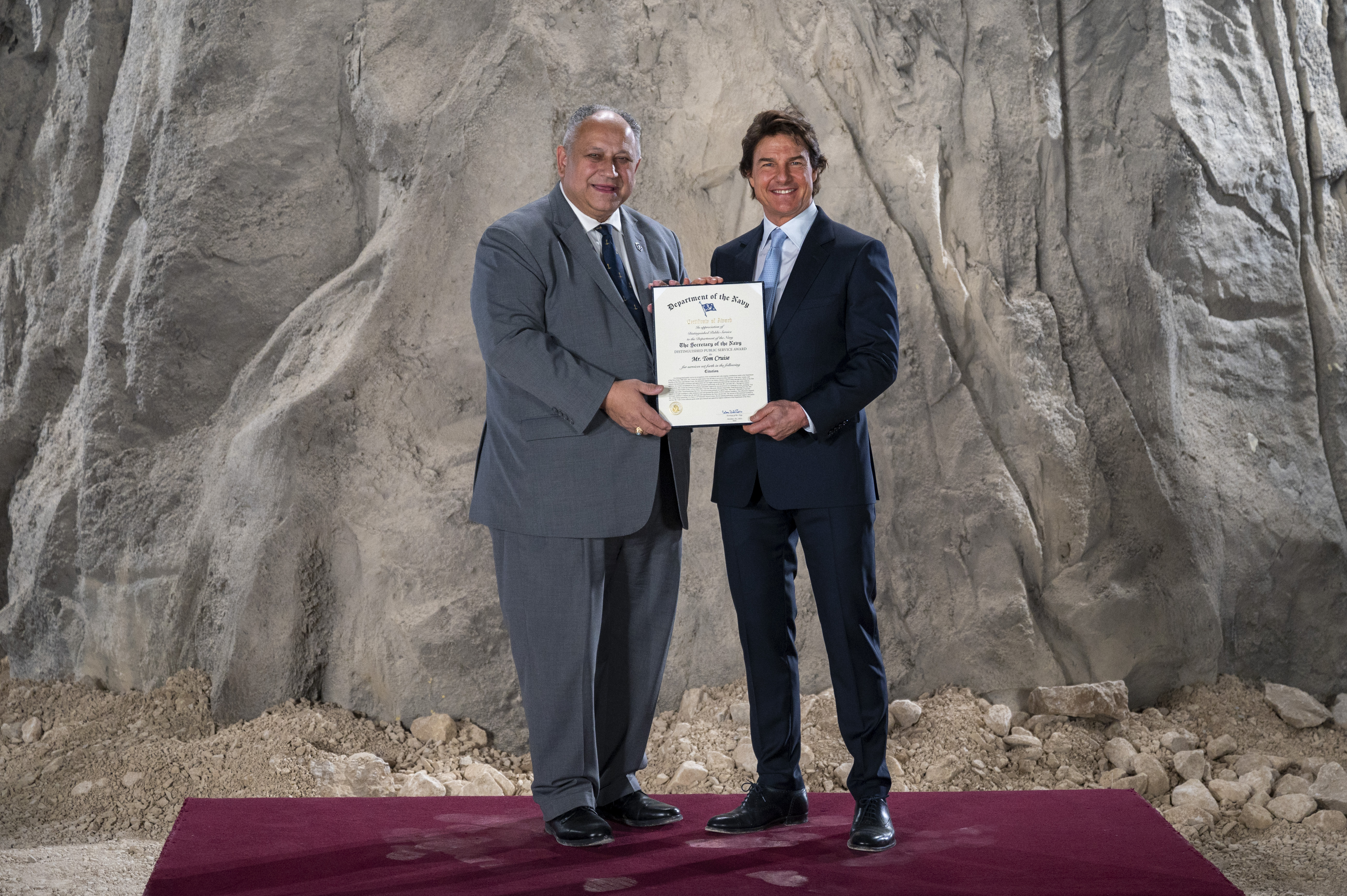
Cruise receiving the Navy Distinguished Public Service Award in 2024

Reviewing Days of Thunder (co-written by Cruise), film critic Roger Ebert noted similarities to several of Cruise's 1980s films and nicknamed the formula the "Tom Cruise Picture". Ebert listed nine ingredients of the Tom Cruise Picture: the Cruise character, the mentor, the superior woman, the craft he must hone, the arena it takes place in, the arcana or knowledge he must learn, the trail or journey, the proto-enemy, and the protagonist's eventual enemy. Some of Cruise's later films, such as A Few Good Men and The Last Samurai, can also be considered to fit this formula. Widescreenings compares two of these Cruise characters in an article on the film A Few Good Men:

[screenwriter] Aaron Sorkin interestingly takes the opposite approach of Top Gun, where Cruise also starred as the protagonist. In Top Gun, Cruise plays Mitchell, who is a "hot shot" military underachiever who makes mistakes because he is trying to outperform his late father. Where Maverick Mitchell needs to rein in the discipline, Daniel Kaffee needs to let it go, finally see what he can do.

Cruise is an aerobatic pilot and was inducted as part of the Living Legends of Aviation in 2010, receiving the Aviation Inspiration and Patriotism Award from the Kiddie Hawk Air Academy. Among other aircraft, Cruise owns a P-51 Mustang.

== Personal life ==
=== Marriages and relationships ===
Cruise splits his time between homes in Beverly Hills, California; Clearwater, Florida; and the south of England, where he has lived in Central London, Dulwich, East Grinstead, and Biggin Hill. In the early to mid-1980s, Cruise had relationships with Melissa Gilbert, Rebecca De Mornay, Patti Scialfa, and Cher.

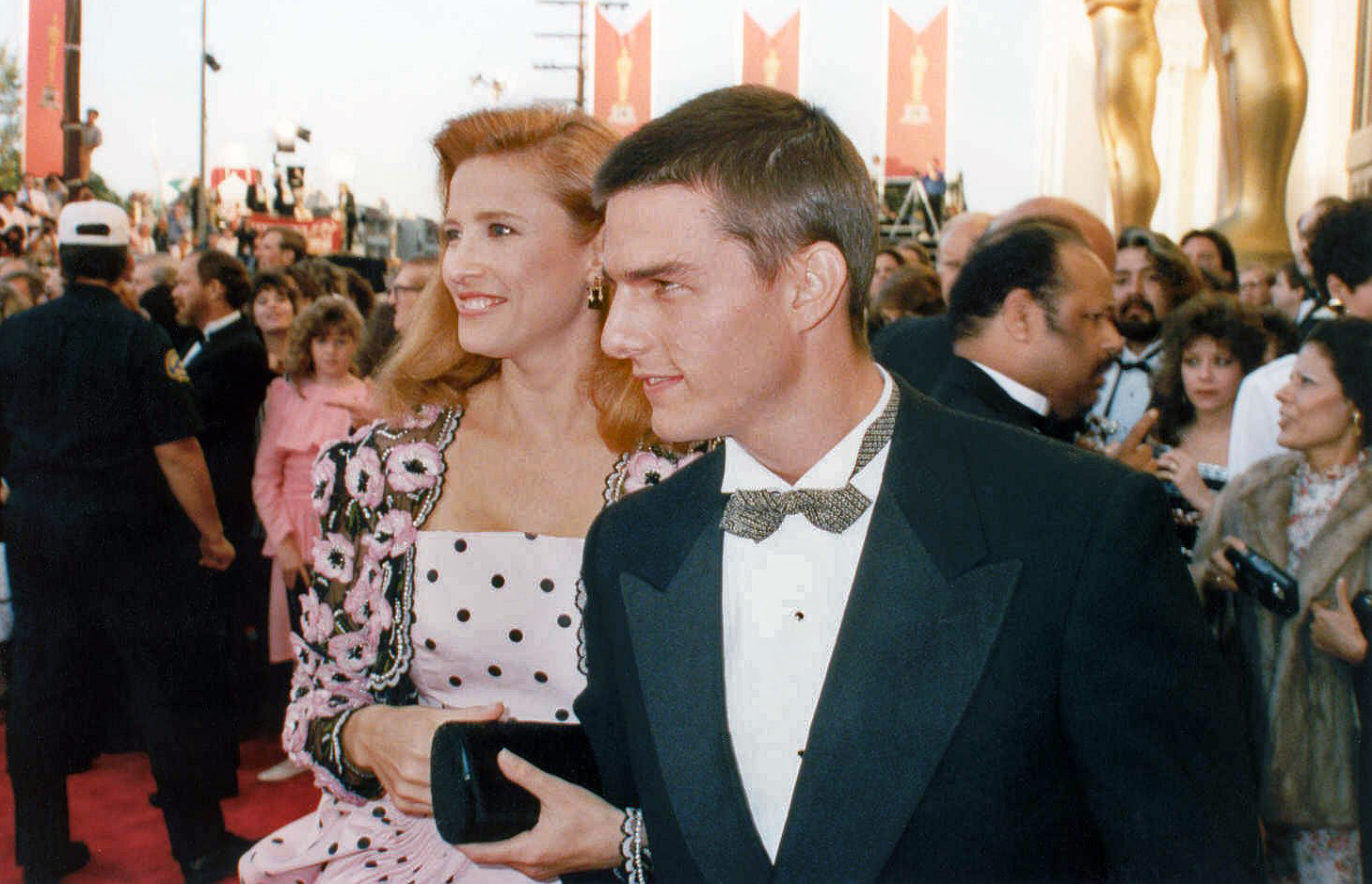
Cruise and Mimi Rogers at the 1989 Oscars

Cruise married actress Mimi Rogers on May 9, 1987. They divorced on February 4, 1990. Rogers had grown up in Scientology and was one of its "auditors"; they met when Cruise became one of her clients. In a 1993 Playboy interview, Rogers discussed her split from Cruise and said he had been considering becoming a monk, which affected their intimacy. Rogers later retracted the comments and said she had been misinterpreted. According to a friend of Rogers, "Tom, his agents and certain studios were furious about what Mimi said in Playboy. She was told in no uncertain terms that her career would be over unless she put things right." Rogers received a $4 million divorce settlement.

Cruise met his second wife, actress Nicole Kidman, on the set of their film Days of Thunder (1990). The couple married on December 24, 1990. They adopted two children: Isabella Jane (born 1992) and Connor Antony (born 1995). On February 5, 2001, the couple's spokesperson announced their separation. Cruise filed for divorce two days later, and their marriage was dissolved later that year, with Cruise citing irreconcilable differences. Kidman said their marriage failed because at the time, she "was a child" who "needed to grow up". According to former church spokesperson and board member Mike Rinder, the Church of Scientology used various means to push the couple to break up, including pressuring Cruise into more auditing and tapping Kidman's phone. In a 2007 interview with Marie Claire, Kidman noted the incorrect reporting of a miscarriage early in her marriage: "It was wrongly reported as miscarriage by everyone who picked up the story. So it's huge news, and it didn't happen. I had a miscarriage at the end of my marriage, but I had an ectopic pregnancy at the beginning of my marriage."

Cruise was next romantically linked with Penélope Cruz, his co-star in Vanilla Sky (2001). Their three-year relationship ended in 2004. The October 2012 issue of Vanity Fair reported that several sources said that after he broke up with Cruz, Scientologist leaders launched a secret project to find Cruise a new girlfriend. According to those sources, a series of "auditions" of Scientologist actresses resulted in a short-lived relationship with Iranian-British actress Nazanin Boniadi, who subsequently left Scientology. Scientology and Cruise's lawyers issued strongly worded denials and threatened to sue, accusing Vanity Fair of "shoddy journalism" and "religious bigotry". Journalist Roger Friedman later reported that he received an email from director and ex-Scientologist Paul Haggis confirming the story.

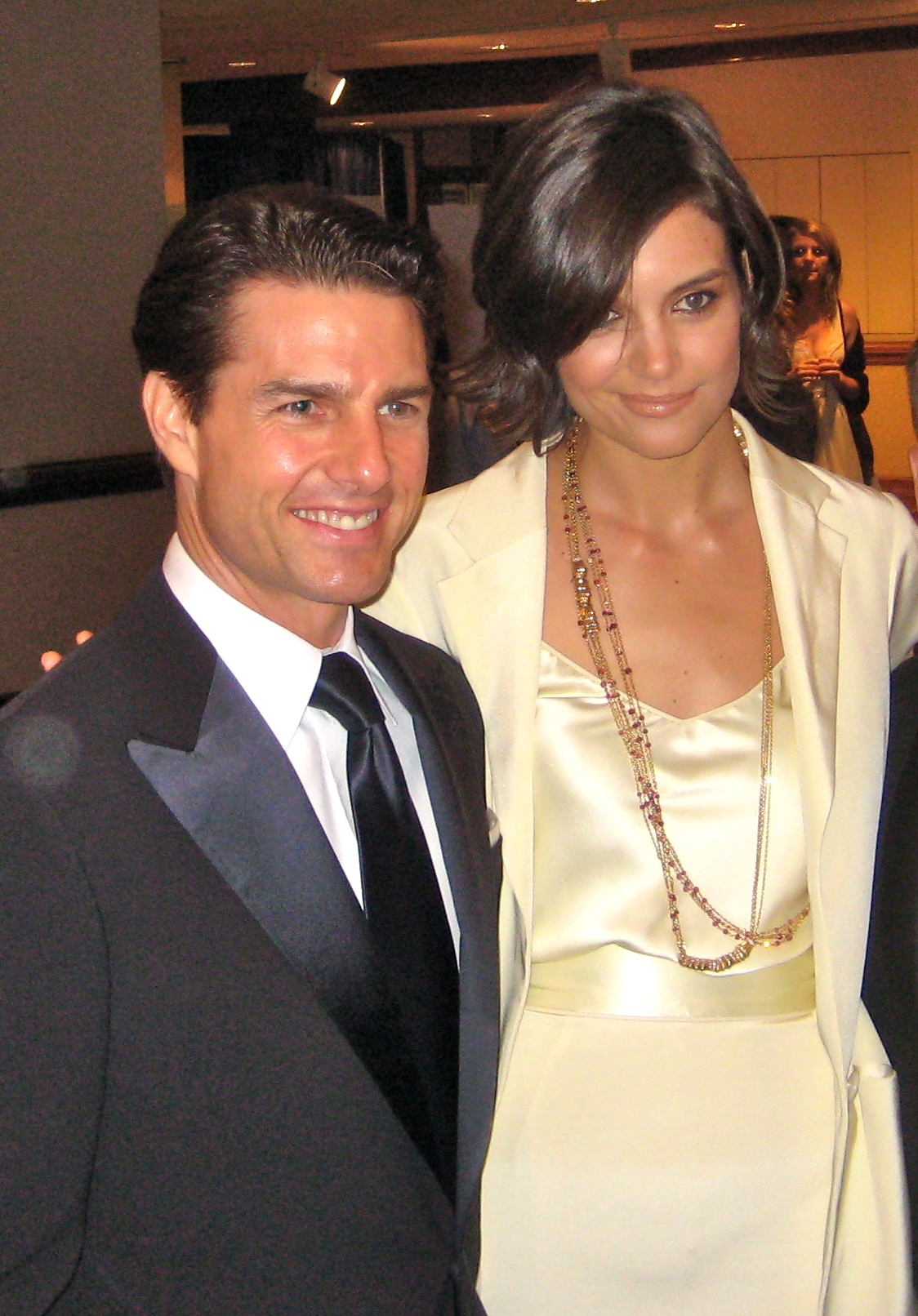
Cruise with his then-wife Katie Holmes in May 2009

In April 2005, Cruise began dating actress Katie Holmes. On April 27 that year, Cruise and Holmes—the supercouple was dubbed TomKat by the media—made their first public appearance together in Rome. A month later, Cruise publicly declared his love for Holmes on The Oprah Winfrey Show; he jumped on Winfrey's yellow couch and stood there to make the announcement. On October 6, 2005, Cruise and Holmes announced they were expecting a child. In April 2006, their daughter, Suri Noelle, was born.

On November 18, 2006, Holmes and Cruise married at the 15th-century castle Castello Orsini-Odescalchi in Bracciano, in a Scientologist ceremony attended by many Hollywood stars. Their publicists said the couple had "officialized" their marriage in Los Angeles the day before the Italian ceremony. It has been widely speculated that the Church of Scientology arranged the marriage. David Miscavige, the head of Scientology, served as Cruise's best man. On June 29, 2012, Holmes filed for divorce from Cruise. On July 9, the couple signed a divorce settlement. New York law requires that all divorce documents remain sealed, so the settlement's terms are not publicly available. Cruise said that Holmes divorced him in part to protect the couple's daughter from Scientology and that Suri is no longer a practicing member of the organization. In 2026, it was reported that Suri had legally changed her surname from Cruise to Noelle, having used the latter for her 2024 high school graduation and voter registration.

=== Litigation ===
In 1998, Cruise sued the Daily Express, a British tabloid that alleged that his marriage to Kidman was a sham designed to cover up his homosexuality. In May 2001, Cruise sued gay porn actor Chad Slater, who had told the celebrity magazine Actustar that he had been involved in an affair with Cruise. Cruise strongly denied that, and Slater was ordered to pay $10 million to Cruise in damages after declaring he could not afford to defend himself in the suit and would therefore default. Cruise requested a default judgment, and in January 2003, a Los Angeles judge decided against Slater after he admitted his claims were false.

Cruise sued Bold Magazine publisher Michael Davis for $100 million after Davis said that he had video proving Cruise was gay. The suit was dropped in exchange for a public statement by Davis that the video was not of Cruise and that Cruise was heterosexual. In 2006, Cruise sued cybersquatter Jeff Burgar to obtain control of the domain name TomCruise.com. When owned by Burgar, the domain redirected to information about Cruise on Celebrity1000.com. The decision to turn TomCruise.com over to Cruise was handed down by the World Intellectual Property Organization (WIPO) on July 5, 2006.

In 2009, magazine editor Michael Davis Sapir filed a suit charging that his phone had been wiretapped at Cruise's behest. That suit was dismissed by a Central Civil West court judge in Los Angeles on the grounds that the statute of limitations had expired on Sapir's claim. In October 2012, Cruise sued In Touch and Life & Style magazines for defamation after they claimed Cruise had "abandoned" his six-year-old daughter. During deposition, Cruise said he hadn't seen his daughter for 110 days. The suit was settled the next year.

=== Scientology advocacy ===
Cruise was converted to Scientology by his first wife, Mimi Rogers, in 1986, and became an outspoken advocate for it in the 2000s. His involvement in the organization was leaked by the tabloid Star in 1990, and he publicly announced he followed Scientology in a 1992 interview with Barbara Walters. Cruise has said that Scientology, through its teaching method Study Technology, helped him overcome his dyslexia. He has been a close friend of Scientology leader David Miscavige since the 1980s.

Several years after Cruise started studying Scientology, the organization's leaders promised to share some Scientology secrets with him, including information about the extraterrestrial ruler Xenu. According to Janet Reitman's book Inside Scientology: The Story of America's Most Secretive Religion (2011), Cruise "freaked out" and took a step back from the Church to work on the 1999 film Eyes Wide Shut. In 1999, Miscavige sent Marty Rathbun to convince Cruise to return to the Church and continue his studies. Cruise sparked controversy in the 2000s with his efforts to promote Scientology.

In the aftermath of the September 11 attacks, Cruise co-founded and raised donations for Downtown Medical to offer New York City rescue workers "detoxification therapy", drawing criticism from medical professionals and firefighters. In late 2004, Miscavige created the Scientology Freedom Medal of Valor and awarded it to Cruise for this work. Former Scientologist Paul Haggis has said that Cruise attempted to convert several celebrities to Scientology, including James Packer, Victoria and David Beckham, Jada Pinkett, Will Smith, and Steven Spielberg. Since 2008, Cruise has restricted interviewers from asking him about Scientology.

In the 2020s, Cruise dated Ana de Armas. They broke up in 2025, reportedly due to religious differences, primarily his desire to recruit her into Scientology. He reportedly severed contact with his daughter, a practice known as disconnection, when her mother, Katie Holmes, refused to raise her in the Church. He did not attend her high school graduation, and Suri dropped her father's surname at age 18.

==== Political lobbying ====
In addition to promoting various programs to introduce people to Scientology, Cruise campaigned for Scientology to be recognized as a religion in Europe. In 2005, the Council of Paris revealed that Cruise had lobbied French Interior Minister Nicolas Sarkozy and Senate President Jean-Claude Gaudin; they described Cruise as a militant spokesman for Scientology and barred any further dealings with him.

=== Politics ===
Cruise donated to Democratic candidate Hillary Clinton during her 2000 Senate campaign in New York. In October 2000, he attended and spoke at a birthday fundraising event for Clinton, alongside other major entertainment figures.

While promoting Valkyrie in January 2009, Cruise said the recent election of Barack Obama as president brought "hope, absolute hope" to the United States and urged Americans to support the new administration.

In 2025, Cruise declined an offer from President Donald Trump to be honored by the Kennedy Center. Later that year, it was reported that Cruise avoided seeking assistance from Trump for an outer-space film project involving NASA, which led to its cancellation.

=== Controversies ===
==== Criticism of psychiatry ====
In January 2004, Cruise said, "I think psychiatry should be outlawed." In 2005, he criticized actress Brooke Shields for using the antidepressant Paxil to treat postpartum depression following the birth of her first daughter. Cruise denied the existence of chemical imbalances in the brain and described psychiatry as a form of pseudoscience. In response, Shields argued that Cruise "should stick to saving the world from aliens and let women who are experiencing postpartum depression decide what treatment options are best for them," and further called Cruise's comments "a disservice to mothers everywhere". In a June 2005 episode of NBC's Today, Cruise reiterated his views, leading to a heated exchange with interviewer Matt Lauer. In August 2006, Cruise apologized in person to Shields for his comments.

Medical authorities viewed Cruise's comments as contributing to the social stigma surrounding mental illness. According to The Lancet, Cruise "may be right that psychotropic drugs are overused, sometimes misused; and that lifestyle changes (and exercise for depression) can be helpful. But he is wrong, as a celebrity, to add to the burden of those with a mental illness, who often fear seeking or continuing treatment because of the stigma still attached to their condition."

Scientology is well known for its opposition to mainstream psychiatry and to psychoactive drugs that are routinely prescribed for treatment. It was reported that Cruise's anti-psychiatry actions caused a rift with director Steven Spielberg. Spielberg had reportedly mentioned in Cruise's presence the name of a doctor friend who prescribed psychiatric medication. Shortly thereafter, the doctor's office was picketed by Scientologists, reportedly angering Spielberg.

==== YouTube video removal ====
On January 15, 2008, a video produced by Church of Scientology featuring an interview with Cruise was posted on YouTube by the Anonymous-linked group Project Chanology, showing Cruise discussing what being a Scientologist means to him. Church of Scientology said the video had been "pirated and edited", and was taken from a three-hour video produced for members of Scientology. YouTube removed the Cruise video from their site under threat of litigation. It was subsequently reinstated on the site, and as of June 2020, the video has achieved more than 15 million views.

==== Purported influence ====
In March 2004, Cruise's publicist of 14 years, Pat Kingsley, resigned. Cruise's next publicist was Lee Anne DeVette, his sister, who was herself a Scientologist. She served in that role until November 2005. DeVette was replaced with Paul Bloch from the publicity firm Rogers and Cowan. Such restructuring was seen as a move to curtail publicity of his views on Scientology, as well as the controversy surrounding his relationship with Katie Holmes. Lawrence Wright's 2013 book Going Clear: Scientology and the Prison of Belief and Alex Gibney's 2015 documentary adaptation of the book cast a spotlight on Cruise's role in Scientology. The book and the film both state that the Scientology organization groomed romantic partners for Cruise and that Cruise used Sea Org and Rehabilitation Project Force workers as a source of free labor. In the film, Cruise's former auditor Mark Rathbun says that Cruise's then-wife Nicole Kidman was wiretapped on Cruise's suggestion, which Cruise's lawyer denies. Cruise's ex-girlfriend Nazanin Boniadi compared the Scientology organization's auditioning of women to date Cruise and experiences with him to "white slavery".

== See also ==
- Tom Cruise: Unauthorized (1998)
- Tom Cruise: All the World's a Stage (2006)
- Tom Cruise: An Unauthorized Biography (2008)
