= Chi (magazine) =

Italian gossip magazine

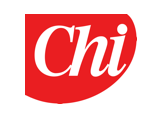

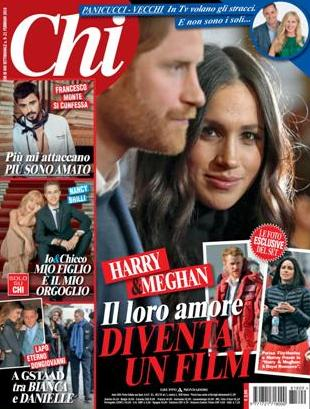
- The 21 February 2018 cover of Chi
- Editor: Alfonso Signorini
- Categories: Gossip magazine
- Frequency: Weekly
- Circulation: 403,599 (2010)
- First issue: 3 March 1995; 31 years ago
- Company: Arnoldo Mondadori Editore
- Country: Italy
- Based in: Segrate, Milan, Italy
- Language: Italian

Chi (Italian for "Who") is an Italian weekly gossip magazine geared towards a female viewership published in Milan, Italy.

== History ==
Chi was established in 1995. The magazine, published weekly, is based in Segrate, Milan. The publisher of the weekly is Arnoldo Mondadori Editore. The company is headed by Marina Berlusconi, Silvio Berlusconi’s older daughter. Alfonso Signorini is the editor of the weekly.

In 2004 Chi sold 524,482 copies. The magazine had a circulation of 503,984 copies in 2007. In 2010 its circulation was down to 403,599 copies.

=== Photo of Diana, Princess of Wales ===
The magazine came under criticism for publishing a picture of Diana, Princess of Wales, taken as she was dying. The photo, which is black-and-white, depicts Diana receiving oxygen in the wreckage of the vehicle in which she died on 31 August 1997. The picture was taken from the book Lady Diana : L'enquete criminelle by Jean-Michel Caradec'h. Despite the criticism, the editor of the magazine defended their decision to publish it.

=== Duchess of Cambridge Photos ===
On 17 September 2012, the magazine published unauthorized photographs of the Duchess of Cambridge, wife of Britain's Prince William. The photos were said to have featured 26 photos of Kate Middleton "in and out of a bikini" while specifically featuring three topless photos of her. The nude photos were to be on the cover of Chi magazine for the week of 16 September 2012 featuring the caption "The Queen is Nude!".

On 12 February 2013, it was widely reported that the magazine had obtained more unauthorized photographs of Kate Middleton, this time of her on a private holiday in the Caribbean whilst pregnant, and plans to publish them. St James's Palace condemned the magazine for infringing on the Duchess' privacy. Indeed, the magazine did publish the photographs the following day.

== See also ==
- List of magazines in Italy
