= Jim Miller (film editor) =

American film editor (born 1955)

- Born: James W. Miller; 1955 (age 69–70); Chicago, Illinois, United States
- Occupation: Film editor
- Known for: nominated for an Academy Award for Best Film Editing for the film Collateral

Jim Miller (born 1955) is an American film editor. Along with Paul Rubell, Miller was nominated for an Academy Award for Best Film Editing for the film Collateral (directed by Michael Mann – 2004).

A native of Chicago, Miller began his film career as an editor and then producer of television commercials and industrial films. He later moved to Los Angeles, where he began editing such television films as Alice in Wonderland and Two Fathers.

Miller's first screen credit was for The Breakfast Club (directed by John Hughes – 1985); he was the associate editor for the distinguished, veteran film editor Dede Allen. Miller's first three editing credits were also for films co-edited by Allen, commencing with The Milagro Beanfield War (directed by Robert Redford – 1988). Following Let It Ride (directed by Joe Pytka – 1989), he and Allen co-edited The Addams Family (1991), which was directed by Barry Sonnenfeld. Miller then worked (without Allen) as the editor for five more of Sonnenfeld's films, including Men in Black (1997) and Wild Wild West (1999).

In addition to their Academy Award nomination, Miller and Rubell's editing of Collateral was honored by nominations for the ACE Eddie Award, BAFTA Award for Best Editing, and the Satellite Award for Best Editing, which they won.

== Filmography ==
Editor
Year	Film	Director	Notes
1988	The Milagro Beanfield War	Robert Redford	
1989	Let It Ride	Joe Pytka	
1991	The Addams Family	Barry Sonnenfeld	First collaboration with Barry Sonnenfeld
1993	For Love or Money	Barry Sonnenfeld	Second collaboration with Barry Sonnenfeld
1993	Addams Family Values	Barry Sonnenfeld	Third collaboration with Barry Sonnenfeld
1995	Get Shorty	Barry Sonnenfeld	Fourth collaboration with Barry Sonnenfeld
1996	2 Days in the Valley	John Herzfeld	
1997	Men in Black	Barry Sonnenfeld	Fifth collaboration with Barry Sonnenfeld
1999	Wild Wild West	Barry Sonnenfeld	Sixth collaboration with Barry Sonnenfeld
2002	Serving Sara	Reginald Hudlin	
2003	Agent Cody Banks	Harald Zwart	
2004	Collateral	Michael Mann	nominated for an Academy Award for Best Film Editing

Editorial department
Year	Film	Director	Role	Notes
1985	The Breakfast Club	John Hughes	Associate film editor	
2006	Peaceful Warrior	Victor Salva	Additional editor	Uncredited

Thanks
Year	Film	Director	Role
2006	Peaceful Warrior	Victor Salva	The producers wish to thank for his additional editing services

TV documentaries

Editor
Year	Film
2000	The First Measured Century

TV series

Editor
Year	Title	Notes
1986	Fortune Dane	1 episode
