= Actustar =

French-language magazine

- Website type: Online magazine, celebrity, tabloid, gossip
- Available in: French
- Owner: Paf!
- Website: Actustar.com
- Launched: 2000
- Current status: Active

Actustar is a Belgian celebrity gossip online magazine. The magazine is part of Paf! Group which acquired it in 2019. It is headquartered in Brussels, Belgium.

== Controversy ==
Actustar on 13 March 2001 published an alleged interview with Kyle Bradford, in which he claimed that he and actor Tom Cruise had a homosexual affair. The story also appeared in the Mexican tabloid TVyNovelas. The affair supposedly occurred during Cruise's marriage to Nicole Kidman and Kidman's discovery of this secret relationship was related to their separation. Cruise categorically denied the story and sued Bradford (Chad Slater) for $10 million.
