= Collateral (film) =

2004 American film by Michael Mann

- Theatrical release poster
- Directed by: Michael Mann
- Written by: Stuart Beattie
- Produced by: Michael Mann; Julie Richardson
- Starring: Tom Cruise; Jamie Foxx; Jada Pinkett Smith; Mark Ruffalo; Peter Berg; Bruce McGill
- Cinematography: Dion Beebe; Paul Cameron
- Edited by: Jim Miller; Paul Rubell
- Music by: James Newton Howard
- Production companies: DreamWorks Pictures; Paramount Pictures; Parkes/MacDonald Productions; Edge City
- Distributed by: DreamWorks Distribution LLC (United States and Canada); Paramount Pictures (through United International Pictures; International)
- Release date: August 6, 2004
- Running time: 120 minutes
- Country: United States
- Language: English
- Budget: $65 million
- Box office: $220 million

Collateral is a 2004 American action thriller film directed and produced by Michael Mann, written by Stuart Beattie, and starring Tom Cruise and Jamie Foxx. The supporting cast includes Jada Pinkett Smith, Mark Ruffalo, Peter Berg, Javier Bardem, and Bruce McGill. The film follows Max Durocher (Foxx), a Los Angeles cab driver, and his customer, Vincent (Cruise). When offered a high fare for driving to several locations, Max agrees but soon finds himself taken hostage by Vincent who turns out to be a sociopathic hitman on a contract killing spree.

Beattie conceived the film's concept while taking a taxi home from Sydney Airport. He shared the idea with producer Julie Richardson, who showed it to director Frank Darabont. The film was pitched to HBO but was declined. It was purchased by DreamWorks Pictures but would not see development for three years. Before the trio of Mann, Cruise and Foxx joined the film, Mimi Leder, Janusz Kamiński and Fernando Meirelles were each considered as director, and Russell Crowe and Adam Sandler were in talks to star as Vincent and Max, respectively. Filming primarily took place throughout Los Angeles, and was the first feature film to be shot with a Viper FilmStream High-Definition Camera. The musical score was composed by James Newton Howard, with additional songs from Audioslave and Paul Oakenfold.

Collateral was released by DreamWorks Pictures in the United States and by Paramount Pictures (through United International Pictures) in other territories on August 6, 2004, and grossed $220 million worldwide against a $65 million budget. The film received critical acclaim in particular for the performances of Cruise and Foxx, Mann's direction, and the editing. Collateral was chosen by the National Board of Review as one of the top ten films of 2004. At the 77th Academy Awards, Foxx received a nomination for Best Supporting Actor, while film editors Jim Miller and Paul Rubell were nominated for Best Film Editing.

== Plot ==
Max Durocher is a Los Angeles cab driver trying to save his earnings and start his own limousine business. One of the evening's fares is federal prosecutor Annie Farrell, who works for the U.S. Attorney for the Central District of California. They strike up a conversation and Annie gives Max her business card. Max's next fare is Vincent, who tells Max that he is in Los Angeles for one night to complete a real estate deal and engages Max for the night to drive him to a series of meetings. As Max waits at the first stop, a corpse falls onto his car. Vincent reveals himself to be a hitman. He forces Max to hide the body in the trunk and continue driving. LAPD Detective Ray Fanning arrives where Vincent made the kill, revealing the victim to be a police informant.

At the second stop, Vincent restrains Max's hands to the steering wheel. While Vincent is away, Max tries to use the horn to signal for help. Two men come around to the car to rob him and seize Vincent's briefcase. Vincent returns, shoots them dead and retrieves the briefcase.

Vincent orders Max to a jazz club to find his third target, Daniel, who is set to testify against Vincent's client. Max pleads with Vincent to let Daniel go and Vincent claims he will if Daniel can answer one question about Miles Davis. Despite Daniel giving a seemingly correct answer, Vincent is dissatisfied with it and shoots Daniel in the head.

Learning of Max's nightly visits to the hospital to see his mother, Vincent insists that Max proceed with the visit. At the hospital, Ida proudly tells Vincent that Max has his own limousine company, revealing Max has been lying to her for her approval. Overwhelmed, Max steals Vincent's briefcase, which contains prep information on Vincent's targets, and runs, eventually hurling it onto a freeway where it is destroyed. Fanning arrives at the hospital morgue to see the bodies of criminal lawyer Sylvester Clark, Vincent's second target, and the two dead robbers, and realizes that it is the work of a hitman. Vincent coerces Max to meet drug lord Felix Reyes-Torrena to re-obtain the information on his final two targets. Max, posing as Vincent, acquires the information and leaves. Reyes-Torrena orders his men to kill "Vincent" if he does not complete the job.

Max goes with Vincent to a nightclub, seeking the next target, Peter Lim. Fanning seeks a connection between the three victims and visits FBI agent Frank Pedrosa, who identifies the victims as witnesses in a federal grand jury which will indict Reyes-Torrena the following day. Pedrosa sees FBI surveillance of Max entering and leaving Reyes-Torrena's bar, concludes that Max is the hitman and orders the FBI agents to protect Lim. At the nightclub, Vincent blends in with the drunk and dancing crowd, then kills Reyes-Torrena's hitmen, Lim, and his bodyguards. Fanning rescues Max and smuggles him outside, but Vincent fatally shoots Fanning and coerces Max back into the cab.

Following their getaway, Max and Vincent get into an argument, with Max repeating Vincent's nihilistic rhetoric about the value of human life. The argument eventually culminates in Max deliberately crashing the cab, attempting to kill Vincent, but it instead only wounds him. Vincent escapes, but a police officer tries to arrest Max after seeing the corpse in the trunk. Max notices Vincent's open laptop, which reveals that his final target is Annie. Max overpowers the police officer, takes a firearm Vincent left behind, and rushes toward Annie's office building.

Stealing a bystander's phone, Max calls Annie to warn her and urge her to call 9-1-1, while learning Annie was prosecuting against Reyes-Torrena and every target was part of her team. Vincent arms himself with a gun from a security guard and corners Annie, but he is shot and wounded by Max, who escapes with Annie on foot. Vincent pursues the pair onto a metro rail train. Cornered on the train, Max engages Vincent in a shootout, blindly firing at one another through the carriages. Vincent attempts to reload his gun, but realizes he is fatally wounded with a bullet to the abdomen, and collapses into a seat. Max and Annie get off the train, leaving Vincent’s body to ride on alone, mirroring a story he told Max when they first met.

== Cast ==
- Tom Cruise as Vincent
- Jamie Foxx as Max Durocher
- Jada Pinkett Smith as Annie Farrell
- Mark Ruffalo as Detective Ray Fanning
- Peter Berg as Detective Richard Weidner
- Bruce McGill as Frank Pedrosa
- Irma P. Hall as Ida Durocher
- Barry Shabaka Henley as Daniel Baker
- Richard T. Jones as Traffic Cop #1
- Klea Scott as Fed #1
- Javier Bardem as Felix Reyes-Torrena
- Emilio Rivera as Paco
- Thomas Rosales, Jr. as Ramon Ayala
- Jason Statham as Airport Man
- Paul Adelstein as Fed #3

== Production ==
=== Development ===
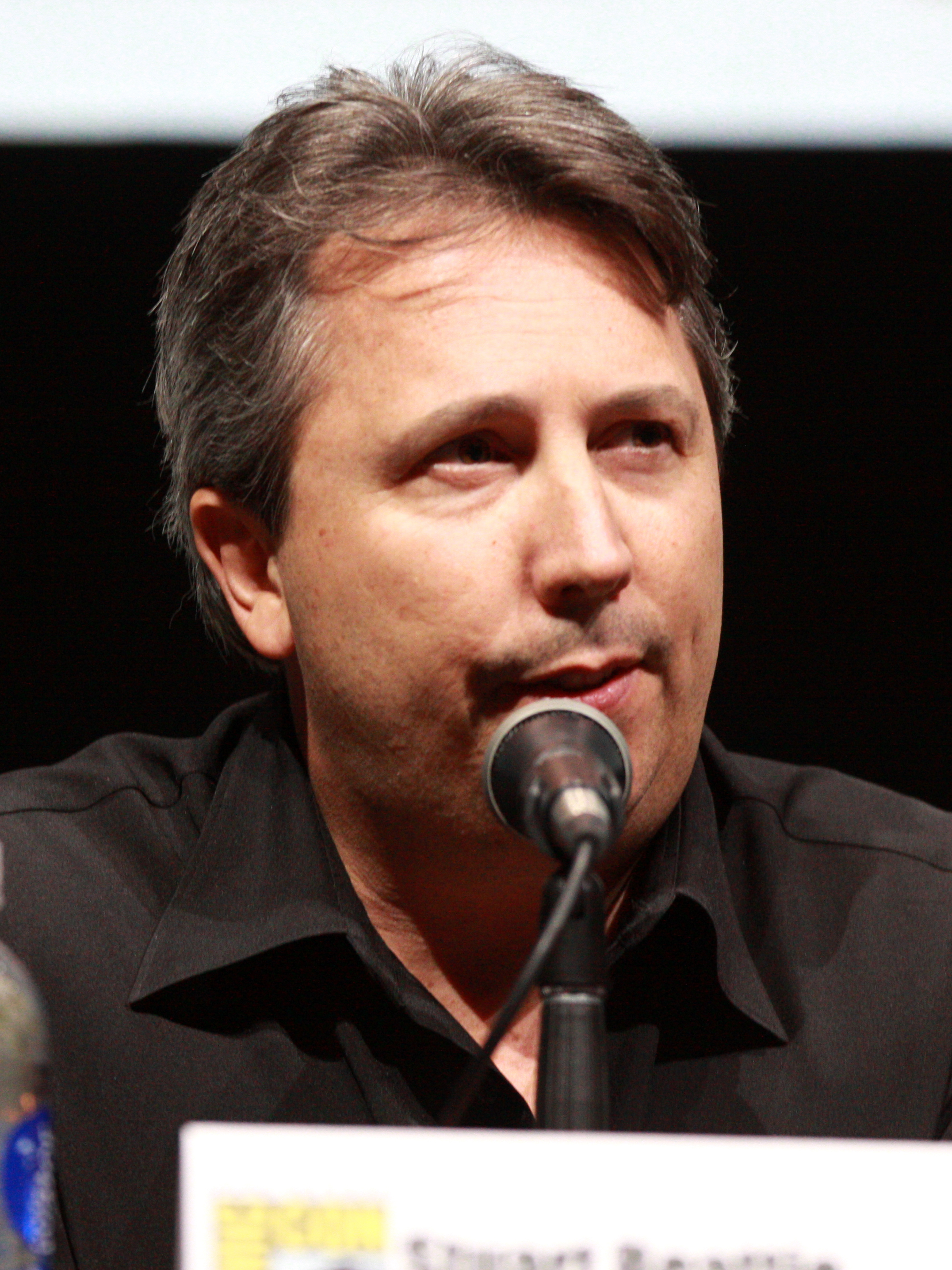
Stuart Beattie conceived of Collateral as a 17 year old, on a cab home from Sydney Airport.

When he was 17 years old, Australian writer Stuart Beattie took a cab home from Sydney Airport and had the idea of a homicidal maniac sitting in the back of a cab with the driver nonchalantly conversing with him, trusting his passenger implicitly. Beattie drafted his idea into a two-page treatment titled "The Last Domino", then later began writing the screenplay. The original story centered around an African-American female cop who witnesses a hit, and the romance between the cab driver and his then librarian girlfriend. The final film has limited resemblance to the original treatment.

Beattie was waiting tables when he came in to contact with Julie Richardson, whom he had met on a UCLA Screenwriting Extension course. Richardson had become a producer and was searching for projects for Frank Darabont, Rob Fried and Chuck Russell's company, Edge City, which was created to make low budget genre films for HBO. Beattie later pitched her his idea of "The Last Domino". Richardson pitched the idea to Darabont, who brought the team in for a meeting, including Beattie, and set up the project under Edge City. After two drafts, HBO passed on the project.

At a general meeting at DreamWorks with executive Marc Haimes, Beattie mentioned the script. Haimes immediately contacted Richardson, read the script overnight, and DreamWorks put in an offer the following day. Early drafts of Collateral's script set the film in New York City. Later revisions of the script moved the film's setting to Los Angeles. Darabont, Fried and Russell would remain on as executive producers.

=== Pre-production ===
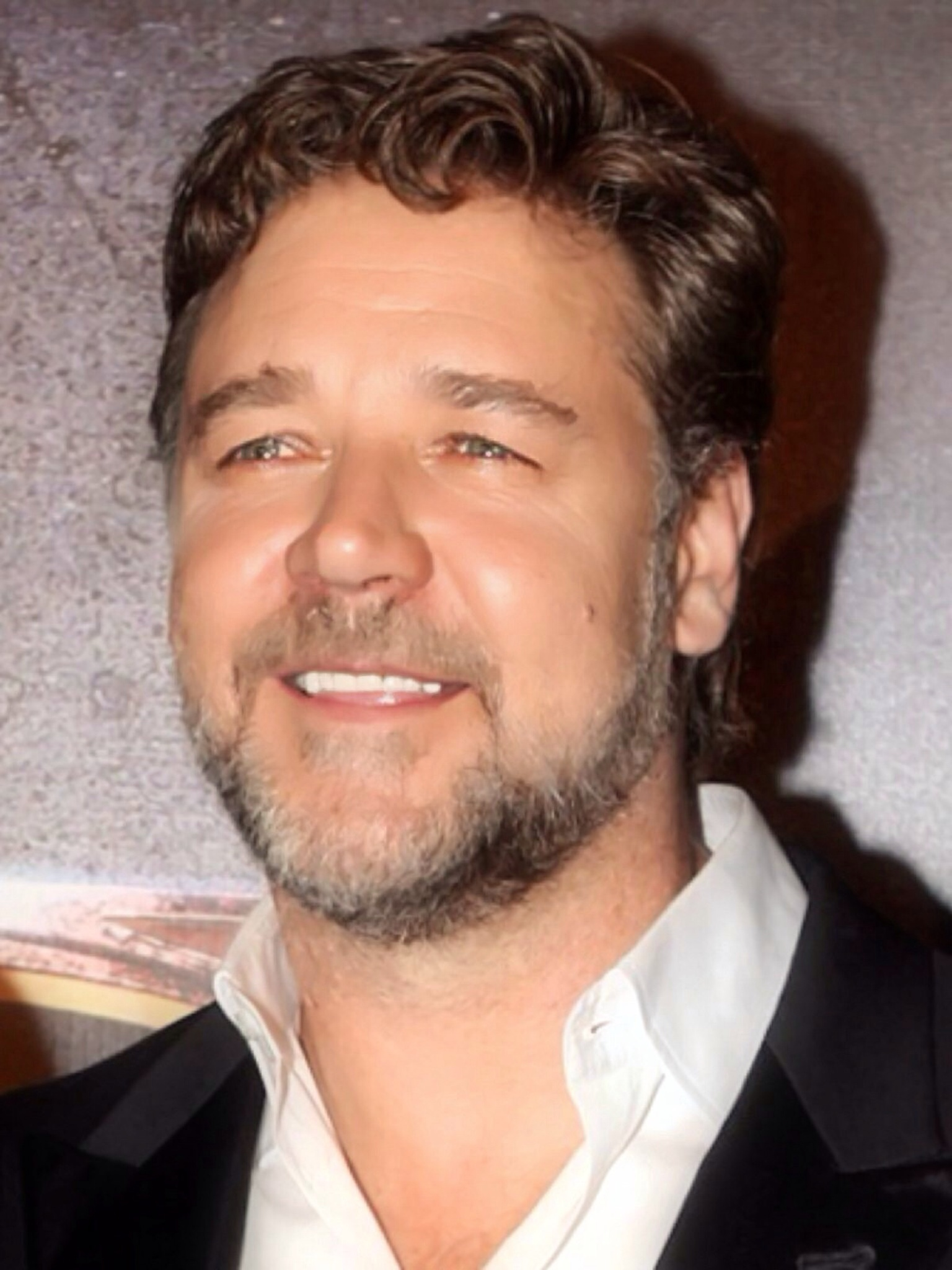
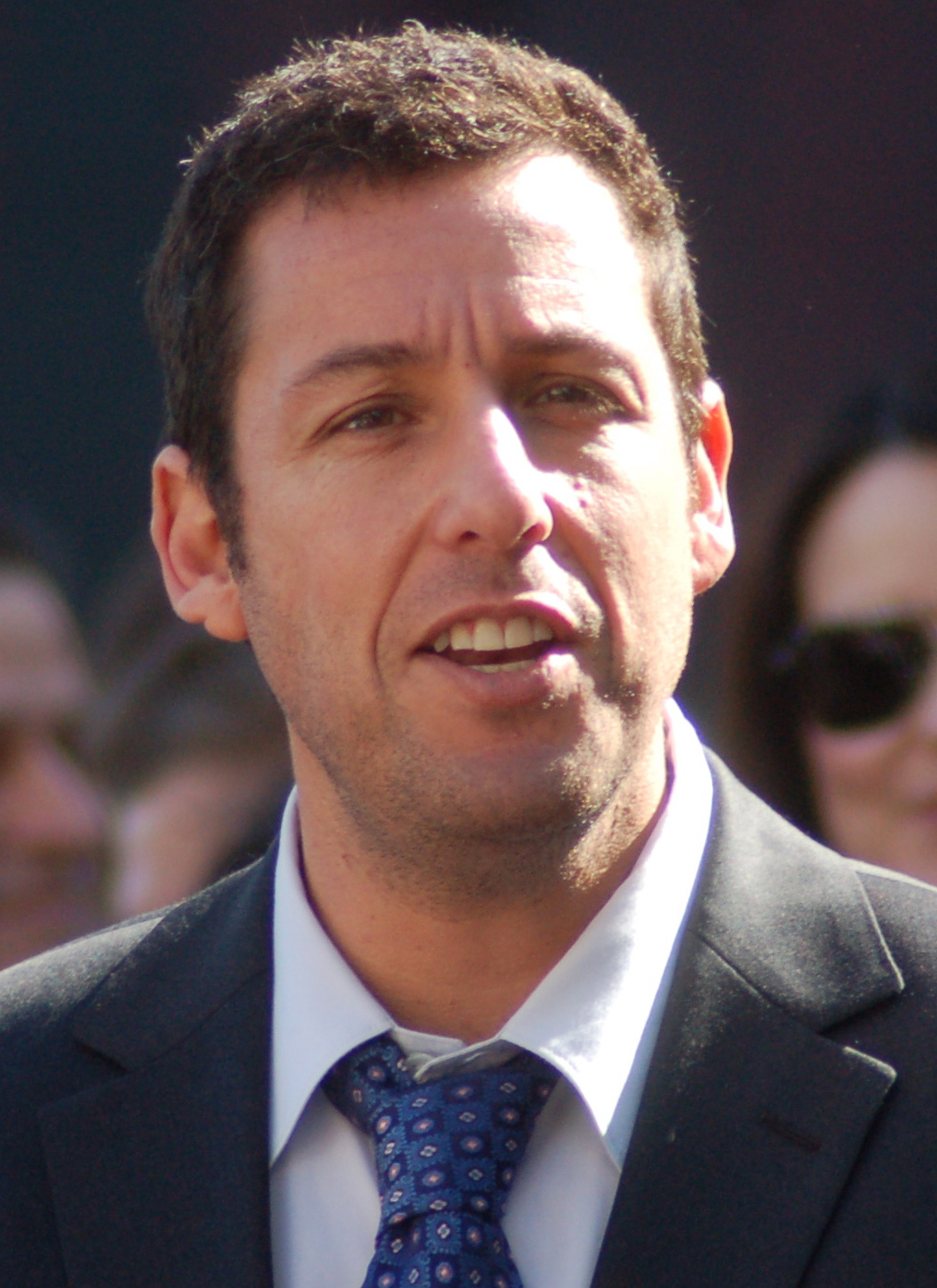
In early versions of the film's development actors Russell Crowe and Adam Sandler were considered to portray Vincent and Max, respectively. Tom Cruise and Jamie Foxx were eventually cast.

Mimi Leder and cinematographer Janusz Kamiński were attached to the project at one point as the director. Brazilian filmmaker Fernando Meirelles had initially agreed to direct, but eventually decided to exit as the production would require him to relocate to Los Angeles for eight months. Meirelles described his vision for the film as being that of a comedy, and looked at telling it in a way similar to Martin Scorsese's After Hours.

Upon Russell Crowe expressing interest in playing the role of Vincent, development on the film moved forward. Crowe got his The Insider director Michael Mann involved, but after constant delays, Crowe departed the project. Mann explained that the confined time frame and smaller scale of the film in comparison to previous efforts like The Last of the Mohicans and Heat were what drew him to the project. Mann then approached Tom Cruise with the idea of him playing Vincent. Adam Sandler was considered for the role of Max, but dropped out due to scheduling conflicts with Spanglish. Cuba Gooding Jr. revealed in a 2018 interview he had turned down a part in the film due to concerns he would be miscast. Beattie wanted the studio to cast Robert De Niro as Max, once again making him a taxi driver, though the exact opposite of Travis Bickle. The studio refused, insisting on a younger actor for the role.

To prepare for the role of Vincent, Cruise watched a few movies about professional killers such as Jean-Pierre Melville’s Le Samouraï (starring Alain Delon), with Cruise describing his fascination with the "solitary and melancholic charisma in carrying out his cruel affairs." Cruise prepared his character's clothing and hair in accordance with Mann's directives to have a perfect exterior mask the dark interior. In the weeks leading up to filming, Cruise worked covertly as a FedEx deliveryman. Mann stated the goal was for Cruise to not be recognized. Mann had Cruise train in firearm use and hand-to-hand combat with a retired SAS soldier. Mann and Cruise also created a full backstory for the character, including the death of Vincent's parents, his violent upbringing in foster homes, and his professional history, which is never mentioned verbally in the film.

Mann cast Foxx, with whom he worked on Ali, in the role of Max due to Mann's perception of a similar performance quality with Cruise. "I saw that [quality of Tom's] in Jamie on In Living Color — his characters were so vivid. That's why I went after him for [cornerman] Bundini Brown in Ali. Jamie starts with mimicry, but then he talks about "putting it into the database", so he can access a character once he's got it down". Mann gave Foxx guidance on being a cab driver based on Mann's personal experience driving a cab as well a several of Mann's family members, including his father and grandfather. Mann also took Foxx on shifts with real cab drivers and facilitated face-to-face interviews to enhance Foxx's understanding of the profession. Foxx received race car driving lessons on a professional track to build up his driving skills.

Jada Pinkett Smith, cast in the role of Annie, spent time with an attorney to inform her performance. Mann also set up a session with a couple would model as Annie's parents in order to ground the character's backstory.

Val Kilmer was originally cast in the film as Detective Fanning, but exited to star in Oliver Stone's Alexander, resulting in Mark Ruffalo taking on the role instead. In a similar situation, Dennis Farina, initially cast as Agent Pedrosa, had to exit due to scheduling conflicts with the television series Law & Order, and was recast with Bruce McGill. Javier Bardem was cast in what was described as "a small role" at the time. Jason Statham made a small appearance in a role credited as "Airport Man", briefly interacting with Cruise at the opening of the film. Louis Leterrier, co-director of the 2002 action film The Transporter, interpreted Statham's scene as a portrayal of his Transporter character Frank Martin.

=== Filming ===
After three weeks of filming, cinematographer Paul Cameron left the project due to creative differences with Mann. Dion Beebe was brought on to replace Cameron. Mann chose to use the Viper FilmStream High-Definition Camera to film many of Collateral's scenes, the first such use in a major motion picture, in order to capture the unique lighting effects present in Los Angeles's nightlife. Mann had previously used the format for portions of Ali and his CBS drama Robbery Homicide Division and would later employ the same camera for the filming of Miami Vice. The sequence in the nightclub was shot in 35 mm.

Filming took place throughout Los Angeles, with Los Angeles International Airport and Koreatown used for set pieces, and filming was also done in Pico Rivera, California.

== Music ==
Collateral: Original Motion Picture Soundtrack

Soundtrack album by Various artists
- Released: August 3, 2004
- Label: Hip-O
- Producer: Various producers

James Newton Howard composed the score for the film, with additional music by Antônio Pinto. As well as the Vangelis composition "Moxica and the Horse," which was composed for the film 1492 Conquest of Paradise. The piece features in Collateral as the FBI race to the Fever nightclub. The Collateral soundtrack was released on August 3, 2004, by Hip-O Records, one notable omission from the soundtrack release is Tom Rothrock's "LAX" which plays as several parties head to the nightclub. Howard estimated that only half of the music he composed was used in the final cut of the film.

Track listing

Collateral: Original Motion Picture Soundtrack
No.	Title	Writer(s)	Producer(s)	Length
1.	"Briefcase" (Tom Rothrock)	Tom Rothrock	Tom Rothrock	2:07
2.	"The Seed (2.0) (extended radio edit)" (The Roots featuring Cody ChesnuTT)	Cody ChesnuTT; Tariq Trotter	?uestlove; Cody ChesnuTT	4:13
3.	"Hands of Time" (Groove Armada)	Andy Cato; Tom Findlay; Richie Havens	Groove Armada	4:19
4.	"Güero Canelo" (Calexico)	Joey Burns	Joey Burns; John Convertino; Craig Schumacher	3:00
5.	"Rollin' Crumblin'" (Tom Rothrock)	Tom Rothrock	Tom Rothrock	2:21
6.	"Max Steals Briefcase" (James Newton Howard)	James Newton Howard	James Newton Howard; Jim Weidman	1:48
7.	"Destino de Abril" (Green Car Motel)	Rick Garcia; Rene Reyes; Cisco De Luna	John Avila; Cisco De Luna	5:15
8.	"Shadow on the Sun" (Audioslave)	Audioslave	Rick Rubin	5:43
9.	"Island Limos" (James Newton Howard)	James Newton Howard	James Newton Howard; Jim Weidman	1:33
10.	"Spanish Key" (Miles Davis)	Miles Davis		2:25
11.	"Air on the G String" (Klazz Brothers & Cuba Percussion)	Johann Sebastian Bach		5:46
12.	"Ready Steady Go (remix)" (Oakenfold)	Paul Oakenfold; Andy Gray	Paul Oakenfold; Andy Gray	4:48
13.	"Car Crash" (Antonio Pinto)	Antonio Pinto		2:19
14.	"Vincent Hops Train" (James Newton Howard)	James Newton Howard	James Newton Howard; Jim Weidman	2:02
15.	"Finale" (James Newton Howard)	James Newton Howard	Jamew Newton Howard; Jim Weidman	2:18
16.	"Requiem" (Antonio Pinto)	Antonio Pinto		1:56
Total length:				51:53

== Reception ==
=== Box office ===
The film opened on August 6, 2004, in 3,188 theaters in the United States and Canada and grossed approximately $24.7 million on its opening weekend, ranking number one at the box office. It remained in theaters for 14 weeks and eventually grossed $101,005,703 in the U.S. and Canada. In other countries, it grossed $119,920,992 for a worldwide $220,926,695.

=== Critical response ===
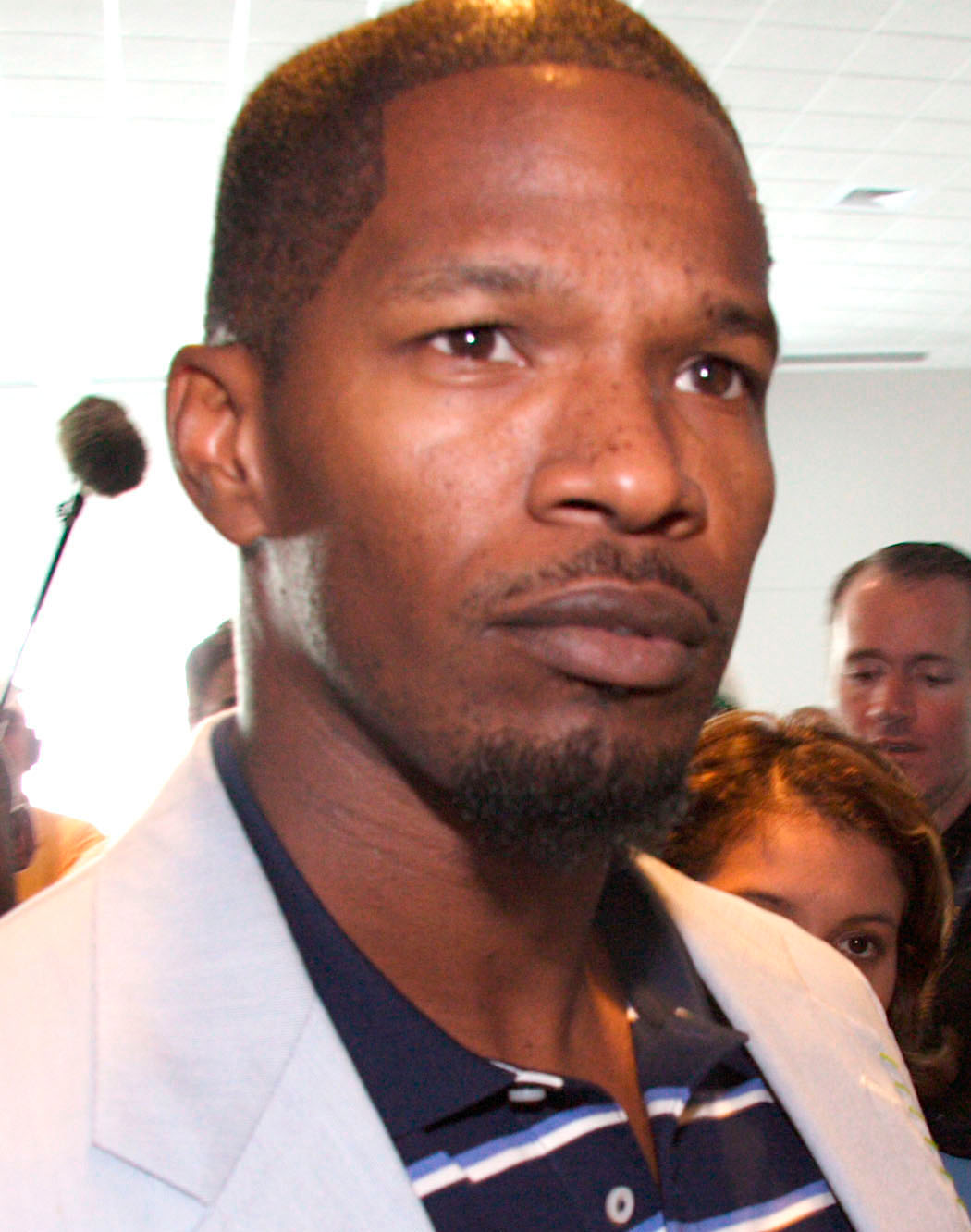
Jamie Foxx's performance received critical acclaim, earning a nomination for the Academy Award for Best Supporting Actor.

Collateral received positive reviews. On the review aggregator Rotten Tomatoes, the film has an approval rating of 86% based on 238 reviews, with an average rating of 7.5/10. The critical consensus states that "Driven by director Michael Mann's trademark visuals and a lean, villainous performance from Tom Cruise, Collateral is a stylish and compelling noir thriller." On Metacritic, the film had an average score of 71 out of 100, based on 41 reviews, indicating "generally favorable" reviews. Audiences polled by CinemaScore gave the film an average grade of "B" on an A+ to F scale.

Stephen Hunter of The Washington Post praised the film and Cruise's performance. He summarized the film as "the best kind of genre filmmaking: It plays by the rules, obeys the traditions and is both familiar and fresh at once". Roger Ebert gave the film three-and-a-half stars out of four, saying Mann's direction and insightful dialogue elevated Collateral above its genre roots. He also praised the performances of Cruise and Foxx, calling Foxx's dramatic performance a "revelation" after establishing himself as a comedian. In addition to praising the performances of Cruise, Pinkett Smith, Mark Ruffalo and Javier Bardem, Mick LaSalle of the San Francisco Chronicle wrote of Foxx's performance: "Foxx can act. He's up to the role's demands, conveying fear, confusion and frustration, but more important the exhaustion and recklessness that can easily follow when someone's been scared for so long".

Desson Thomson gave similar praise to Foxx, finding the actor "quietly pries the movie from Cruise's big-marquee fingers". David Ansen of Newsweek praised the film, although he criticized its third act as "generic and farfetched". Placing the film on his best of the year list, Richard Schickel of Time magazine praised the acting in addition to Mann's direction and Beattie's screenplay, despite finding logical inconsistencies in the plot and that it "does not have quite enough completely compelling incidents to sustain its considerable length".

In a mixed review, Marrit Ingman of the Austin Chronicle gave positive remarks to Mann's film-making, but stated "There's not much substance lurking beneath all the style, though the plot digresses into several awkward scenes intended to flesh out the characters". David Edelstein of Slate magazine highlighted Foxx's performance as "terrific" and was favorable to the film's first act, but derided the rest of the film. "It's too bad that halfway through, Collateral turns into a series of loud, chaotic, over-the-top action set pieces in which the existentialist Mann proves he's lousy at action". Edelstein also criticized the performance of Cruise, referring to his performance as "robotic".

Stephanie Zacharek of Salon magazine criticized Cruise's performance, finding that "Cruise's dignity rings stiff and false". Zacharek did praise the performance of Foxx, stating "Foxx inhabits his character so comfortably that he renders meaningless Vincent's babble about the tough, real world. Max is the one who lives in the real world, which is ultimately the point of the movie -- but it takes the picture a very long time to reach a conclusion that's evident from the start to any attuned viewer".

Richard Roeper placed Collateral as his 10th favorite film of 2004. In 2008, the film was voted as the 9th best film set in Los Angeles in the last 25 years by a group of Los Angeles Times writers and editors with two criteria: "The movie had to communicate some inherent truth about the L.A. experience, and only one film per director was allowed on the list".

In 2025, it was one of the films voted for the "Readers' Choice" edition of The New York Times' list of "The 100 Best Movies of the 21st Century," finishing at number 191.

== Awards ==
Awards
Award	Category	Recipient(s)	Outcome	Ref.
Academy Awards	Best Supporting Actor	Jamie Foxx	Nominated	
Academy Awards	Best Film Editing	Jim Miller and Paul Rubell	Nominated	
AFI Awards	Top Ten Films	Collateral	Won	
American Society of Cinematographers	Outstanding Achievement in Cinematography in Theatrical Releases	Dion Beebe and Paul Cameron	Nominated	
Art Directors Guild	Feature Film – Contemporary Film	David Wasco, Daniel T. Dorrance, Aran Mann, Gerald Sullivan and Christopher Tandon	Nominated	
British Academy Film Awards	Best Direction	Michael Mann	Nominated	
British Academy Film Awards	Best Original Screenplay	Stuart Beattie	Nominated	
British Academy Film Awards	Best Actor in a Supporting Role	Jamie Foxx	Nominated	
British Academy Film Awards	Best Cinematography	Dion Beebe and Paul Cameron	Won	
British Academy Film Awards	Best Editing	Jim Miller and Paul Rubell	Nominated	
British Academy Film Awards	Best Sound	Elliott Koretz, Lee Orloff, Michael Minkler and Myron Nettinga	Nominated	
Broadcast Film Critics Association	Best Film	Collateral	Nominated	
Broadcast Film Critics Association	Best Supporting Actor	Jamie Foxx	Nominated	
Dallas–Fort Worth Film Critics Association	Best Supporting Actor	Jamie Foxx	Nominated	
Golden Globe Awards	Best Supporting Actor	Jamie Foxx	Nominated	
Los Angeles Film Critics Association	Best Cinematography	Dion Beebe and Paul Cameron	Won	
MTV Movie Awards	Best Villain	Tom Cruise	Nominated	
National Board of Review	Top Ten Films	Collateral	Won	
National Board of Review	Best Director	Michael Mann	Won	
National Society of Film Critics Awards	Best Actor	Jamie Foxx	Won	
Saturn Awards	Best Action or Adventure Film	Collateral	Nominated	
Saturn Awards	Best Director	Michael Mann	Nominated	
Saturn Awards	Best Writing	Stuart Beattie	Nominated	
Saturn Awards	Best Actor	Tom Cruise	Nominated	
Screen Actors Guild Awards	Outstanding Performance by a Male Actor in a Supporting Role	Jamie Foxx	Nominated	
Washington D.C. Area Film Critics Association	Best Supporting Actor	Jamie Foxx	Won	
