= Jonathan Sanger =

American film and television producer (born 1944)

- Born: April 21, 1944 (age 82); Brooklyn, New York, U.S.
- Occupations: Film director, producer, media consultant
- Years active: 1971–present
- Notable work: The Elephant Man, Vanilla Sky, Flight of the Navigator, Ray's Male Heterosexual Dance Hall, Frances
- Spouse: Carla Sanger
- Children: 2

Jonathan Sanger (born April 21, 1944) is an American film, television, and theater producer and director.

== Early life and career ==
Sanger was born in Brooklyn, New York, but spent much of his early childhood traveling with his family around Central and South America. Sanger's interest in theater stemmed from his undergraduate years at the University of Pennsylvania, where he was chairman of the Board of The Pennsylvania Players, and President of the Performing Arts Council. At the graduate level, Sanger attended the Annenberg School of Communications at the University of Pennsylvania, studying documentary and biography based filmmaking. After graduating, Sanger joined the Peace Corps in a special program with an emphasis on television and film production. Sanger was assigned to help create an Educational Television station in Montevideo, Uruguay. He later transferred to Bogotá, Colombia, to make films for ICODES, the Colombian Institute of Social Development. After his Peace Corps term was completed, Sanger worked on documentary films in Ecuador, Chile and Mexico for NBC's International Zone. Soon after, he became Associate Editor for Americás, a cultural magazine published by The Organization of American States, where he wrote and translated articles. Sanger was contracted by the Encyclopædia Britannica to write the article on Bogotá, Colombia for Britannica 3.

== Film ==
In 1971, Sanger was accepted as a member of the Directors Guild of America Training Program, and worked on several films shot in New York City, among which were Across 110th Street, Harry and Tonto and Next Stop, Greenwich Village. Moving to Los Angeles in 1976, Sanger worked for Lorimar Television on the network Television series The Blue Knight and Eight Is Enough. In 1978, he was Mel Brooks' Assistant Director on High Anxiety, which led to a long professional association. For Brooks' wife, Anne Bancroft's feature directorial debut Fatso, Sanger served as Associate Producer. During this period, Sanger had acquired the rights to the script of The Elephant Man. Sanger brought the script to Brooks' newly created independent production company, and The Elephant Man was chosen as the company's first project; it was Sanger's debut feature film producing credit. It received eight Academy Award nominations, including Best Picture, and was awarded the BAFTA Award for Best Film in 1980 and the French César Award for Best Foreign Film.

== Film producing ==
Sanger has produced over fifty films, shorts and documentaries, including the 1982 film Frances, a biography starring Jessica Lange, Kim Stanley and Sam Shepard. Sanger joined Cruise/Wagner Productions (Tom Cruise and Paula Wagner's production company) in 1996. He executive produced Without Limits, Suspect Zero and Vanilla Sky as well as supervising production on Mission: Impossible 2 as well as all the Cruise/Wagner Productions over his six years with that company. Other films produced by Sanger include Flight of the Navigator for Walt Disney Productions, The Doctor and the Devils for Twentieth Century Fox, The Producers, 100 Feet, and Paraíso Travel

== Directing career ==
Among Sanger's directing credits are: Code Name: Emerald, a World War II spy drama; Down Came a Blackbird a television film for Showtime Networks, nominated for three CableACE Awards; and several movies-of-the-week for NBC, CBS and ABC. In addition to writing numerous episodic television shows, Sanger also wrote and directed the short film Peacemaker, with Lukas Haas, for PBS' American Playhouse, which was awarded the Best Short Subject at the Houston International Film Festival.

== Chanticleer Films ==
In the late 1980s Sanger partnered with fellow producer Jana Sue Memel to create Chanticleer Films as an umbrella company for The Discovery Program. The mission statement of this company was to create an opportunity for film professionals (writers, editors, actors, sound mixers, cinematographers, etc.) to direct a 35mm feature-quality short film. Hundreds of professionals applied for the five directing spots available annually. In the eight years of Sanger's involvement, over forty five films were made; ten were nominated for an Academy Award, and three won. The first film produced by Sanger for the program, Ray's Male Heterosexual Dance Hall, won the Academy Award for Best Short Film in 1988.

The Academy Film Archive houses the Chanticleer Films Discovery and Directed by Shorts Collection, consisting of 35mm prints and elements for more than sixty short films.

== Theater ==
In 2008, Sanger produced his first musical, the true story of Florence Greenberg, pioneer rock and roll record producer, entitled Baby It's You. The musical started as a workshop production in a West Hollywood theater before moving to the Pasadena Playhouse. Warner Brothers Theatrical Ventures and Universal Music Group became producing partners, and the show made its Broadway debut in March 2010. Sanger has several other musicals in development and also directed his first play, the dystopian drama, The Birthday Present - 2050 in 2010.

== Filmography ==
He was a producer in all films unless otherwise noted.

=== Film ===
Year	Film	Credit
1979	A Force of One	Associate producer
1980	Fatso	Associate producer
1980	The Elephant Man	
1982	Frances	
1985	Code Name: Emerald	Co-producer
1985	The Doctor and the Devils	
1986	Flight of the Navigator	Executive producer
1988	The Jogger	
1991	Without a Pass	Executive producer
1993	House of Cards	Co-producer
1994	Sherwood's Travels	
1998	Without Limits	Executive producer
2001	Vanilla Sky	Executive producer
2004	Suspect Zero	Executive producer
2005	The Producers	
2008	Paraiso Travel	Executive producer
2008	100 Feet	
2013	Altered Minds	Executive producer
2016	Chapter & Verse	
2017	Marshall	
2024	Cabrini	

As director

Year	Film	Notes
1985	Code Name: Emerald	
1989	Peacemaker	Short film

Second unit director or assistant director

Year	Film	Role
1976	Next Stop, Greenwich Village	Second assistant director
1976	One Summer Love	Second assistant director
1976	Hawmps!	Second assistant director
1977	Thieves	Second assistant director
1977	Nasty Habits	Assistant director: US
1977	High Anxiety	Assistant director
1978	Movie Movie	Assistant director
1980	Below the Belt	Assistant director
1998	Without Limits	Second unit director
2001	Vanilla Sky	Second unit director

Production manager

Year	Film	Role
1978	Movie Movie	Unit production manager
1978	The Brink's Job	Production manager
1979	A Force of One	Unit production manager
1980	Fatso	Unit production manager
2000	Mission: Impossible 2	Executive in charge of production: USA
2008	100 Feet	Unit production manager

As an actor

Year	Film	Role	Notes
1986	Flight of the Navigator	Dr. Carr	
2001	Vanilla Sky	Frozen Pediatric Cardiologist	
2008	100 Feet	Man on Bus with Newspaper	Uncredited

As writer

Year	Film	Notes
1989	Peacemaker	Short film

Miscellaneous crew

Year	Film	Role
2001	The Others	Production consultant

Thanks

Year	Film	Role
2007	Americanizing Shelley	Grateful acknowledgment

=== Television ===
Year	Title	Credit	Notes
1989	Teach 109	Executive producer	Television short
1989	Open Window	Executive producer	Television short
1990	The Showtime 30-Minute Movie	Executive producer	
1991	American Playhouse	Executive producer	
1991	The Letters from Moab	Executive producer	Television short
1992	The Washing Machine Man	Executive producer	Television short
1992	Fifteenth Phase of the Moon	Executive producer	Television short
1992	Another Round	Executive producer	Television short
1993	The Last Shot	Executive producer	Television short
1993	Lush Life		Television film
1993	The Great O'Grady		Television short
1993	Night Driving	Executive producer	Television short
1994	Missing Parents	Executive producer	Television short
1994	18 Minutes in Albuquerque	Executive producer	Television short
1995	Take Out the Beast	Executive producer	Television short
1996	Mr. & Mrs. Smith	Co-executive producer	
1998	Grandpa's Funeral	Executive producer	Television short
2015	The wHOLE	Executive producer	

As director

Year	Title	Notes
1986	L.A. Law	
1988	Hothouse	
1989−90	Wiseguy	
1990	Children of the Bride	Television film
1990	The Flash	
1990	Broken Badges	
1991	Twin Peaks	
1991	American Playhouse	
1991	The Commish	
1991	Chance of a Lifetime	Television film
1992	Obsessed	Television film
1992	Just My Imagination	Television film
1992	On the Air	
1993	The Secrets of Lake Success	
1994	seaQuest DSV	
1995	Down Came a Blackbird	Television film
1995	The Marshal	
1996	Mr. & Mrs. Smith	

Production manager

Year	Title	Role	Notes
1977	Eight Is Enough	Unit production manager	
1993	12:01	Unit production manager	Television film

As an actor

Year	Title	Role	Notes
1993	Love Matters	Therapist	Television film

== Other achievements ==
In addition to twenty Academy Award nominations and three wins, Sanger has won a Christopher Award, a BAFTA (BAFTA Award for Best Film), a César Award, Scholastic Magazine's Bell Ringer Award, and a Cine Golden Eagle Award CINE. Sanger was named Filmmaker-in-Residence at Chapman University's Dodge College of Film And Media Arts during the Spring semester of 2010, and was made adjunct professor in 2011, teaching a course in Creative Producing. He has been a member of the Academy of Motion Picture Arts and Sciences since 1981, and a member of the Directors Guild of America (DGA) since 1971, serving on its National Board. His other professional organizations include The Producers Guild of America (PGA), The Academy of Television Arts and Sciences, and the Screen Actors Guild (SAG-AFTRA). In 2016, McFarland & Co. Inc. published Sanger's new book, Making The Elephant Man: A Producer's Memoir.

== Family ==
Sanger is married to Carla Sanger, and has two sons: David and Christopher Sanger. He has two grandsons, Harrison and Miles Sanger and two grand daughters, Zada and Liliana.
