= Mission: Impossible III =

2006 film by J. J. Abrams

- Theatrical release poster
- Directed by: J. J. Abrams
- Written by: Alex Kurtzman; Roberto Orci; J. J. Abrams
- Based on: Mission: Impossible by Bruce Geller
- Produced by: Tom Cruise; Paula Wagner
- Starring: Tom Cruise; Philip Seymour Hoffman; Ving Rhames; Billy Crudup; Michelle Monaghan; Jonathan Rhys Meyers; Keri Russell; Maggie Q; Laurence Fishburne
- Cinematography: Dan Mindel
- Edited by: Mary Jo Markey; Maryann Brandon
- Music by: Michael Giacchino (Note: Mission: Impossible Theme composed by Lalo Schifrin)
- Production companies: Paramount Pictures; Cruise/Wagner Productions
- Distributed by: Paramount Pictures
- Release date: May 5, 2006
- Running time: 126 minutes
- Country: United States
- Language: English
- Budget: $150 million
- Box office: $398.5 million

Mission: Impossible III (abbreviated as M:i:III) is a 2006 American action spy film directed by J. J. Abrams (in his feature film directorial debut), and produced by and starring Tom Cruise, from a screenplay by Abrams and the writing team of Alex Kurtzman and Roberto Orci. It is a standalone sequel to Mission: Impossible (1996) and Mission: Impossible 2 (2000) and the third installment in the Mission: Impossible film series. It also stars Philip Seymour Hoffman, Ving Rhames, Billy Crudup, Michelle Monaghan, Jonathan Rhys Meyers, Keri Russell, Maggie Q, and Laurence Fishburne. In Mission: Impossible III, retired Impossible Mission Force (IMF) agent and trainer Ethan Hunt (Cruise) is forced to return to active duty to capture elusive arms dealer Owen Davian (Hoffman).

Development for a third Mission: Impossible film began in 2002, with David Fincher slated to direct; he and his eventual replacement Joe Carnahan both departed by 2004, both citing creative differences. Abrams was hired later at the behest of Cruise, who was a fan of Abrams's Alias (2001–2006), but this further delayed production on the film due to Abrams's contractual obligations for Alias and Lost (2004–2010), and caused prospective cast additions Kenneth Branagh, Carrie-Anne Moss and Scarlett Johansson to depart the film. Principal photography began in July 2005 and lasted until that November, with filming locations including Shanghai, Berlin, Rome, Los Angeles and Vatican City.

Mission: Impossible III premiered at the Tribeca Film Festival on April 26, 2006, and was released in the United States by Paramount Pictures on May 5, 2006. It received generally positive reviews from critics, with praise for its pace and stunts, and was considered an improvement over its predecessors. The film grossed over $398 million worldwide, becoming the eighth-highest-grossing film of 2006; despite being the lowest-grossing film in the franchise, the film was still a box-office success. The sequel, Ghost Protocol, was released in 2011. The film's storylines are continued by future sequels Fallout (2018) and The Final Reckoning (2025).

== Plot ==
IMF agent Ethan Hunt has retired from fieldwork and has settled down with his fiancée, nurse Julia Meade, who is unaware of his job training recruits. IMF Director of Operations John Musgrave approaches him about a special mission to rescue one of his protégés, Lindsey Farris, who was captured while investigating arms dealer Owen Davian. Musgrave has already prepared a team for Ethan: Declan Gormley, Zhen Lei, and old partner Luther Stickell. The team rescues Lindsey in Berlin and collects two damaged laptops. As they flee, Ethan discovers an explosive pellet implanted in Lindsey's head. Before he can disable it with a defibrillator, it detonates and kills her.

Ethan later learns that Lindsey mailed him a postcard before her capture and discovers a magnetic microdot under the stamp. IMF technician Benji Dunn recovers enough data from the laptops to determine Davian will be in Vatican City to obtain a mysterious biological hazard codenamed the "Rabbit's Foot". Ethan visits Julia at her work, which results in their spontaneous marriage. Ethan plans an unofficial mission to capture Davian. The team successfully infiltrates the Vatican and captures Davian. On the return flight to the US, Davian is unfazed by Ethan's interrogation and responds by threatening to kill everyone for whom he cares.

After landing, Ethan learns that Lindsey's microdot is a warning about Davian and IMF director Theodore Brassel. The convoy taking them across the Chesapeake Bay Bridge is ambushed by mercenaries, who extract Davian. Realizing Julia is in danger, Ethan races to Julia's hospital to discover she has already been kidnapped. Davian calls Ethan and gives him 48 hours to deliver the Rabbit's Foot in exchange for Julia's life. Before he can move, Ethan is apprehended by the IMF and questioned about the loss of Davian. While in the room as part of Ethan's interrogation, Musgrave discreetly mouths that the Rabbit's Foot is located in Shanghai and assists Ethan in escaping. Ethan travels to Shanghai and meets his team, which Musgrave sent there under the guise of another operation. Ethan obtains the Rabbit's Foot and delivers it to Davian, who tranquilizes him and implants a micro-explosive similar to the one that killed Lindsey in his head.

Waking up, Ethan sees Davian holding a gagged Julia at gunpoint. Davian tells Ethan that he will count to ten and shoot Julia if he doesn't tell him where the Rabbit's Foot is. Despite Ethan asserting that he brought the real Rabbit's Foot, Davian seemingly shoots Julia and leaves. Musgrave arrives and reveals himself as the actual IMF traitor. Julia is still alive, and the dead woman is Davian's translator and head of security, who is used to confirm the authenticity of the Rabbit's Foot. Musgrave was working with Davian to obtain the Rabbit's Foot so that the IMF would have cause to launch a preemptive strike against an unnamed Middle East country in order to secure the United States' status as the sole global superpower while spreading democracy throughout the region. Ethan knocks Musgrave unconscious, frees himself, and uses Musgrave's phone to obtain Julia's location.

With Benji's help, Ethan locates Julia but encounters Davian, who activates the explosive in Ethan's head. Ethan fights Davian, with the two falling into the nearby street. Ethan uses the environment to his advantage, and kills Davian by throwing him in front of a semi-truck, before freeing Julia. He jerry-rigs an impromptu defibrillator to deactivate the explosive, asking Julia to bring him back and teaching her how to shoot a gun. Julia kills a henchman, then Musgrave, who is carrying the Rabbit's Foot, before resuscitating Ethan, who finally explains his IMF career to her. Back in the US, Brassel and others congratulate Ethan as he leaves for his honeymoon with Julia.

== Cast ==
- Tom Cruise as Ethan Hunt
- Ving Rhames as Luther Stickell, a computer hacker, IMF agent and Ethan's closest ally
- Philip Seymour Hoffman as Owen Davian
- Michelle Monaghan as Julia Meade
- Maggie Q as Zhen Lei, an IMF agent who assists Ethan at the Vatican and in Shanghai
- Jonathan Rhys Meyers as Declan Gormley, an IMF agent who assists Ethan at the Vatican and in Shanghai
- Billy Crudup as John Musgrave
- Keri Russell as Lindsey Farris
- Simon Pegg as Benjamin "Benji" Dunn, an IMF agent and technician who has worked with Ethan in the past
- Laurence Fishburne as Theodore Brassel
- Bahar Soomekh as Davian's translator and head of security
- Jeff Chase as Davian's bodyguard
- Michael Berry Jr. as Julia's kidnapper
- Eddie Marsan as Brownway
- Bellamy Young as Rachael, Julia's six-month pregnant sister
- Carla Gallo as Beth
- Greg Grunberg as Kevin
- Rose Rollins as Ellie
- Sasha Alexander as Melissa
- Aaron Paul as Rick Meade
- Bruce French as Minister

== Production ==
=== Development ===
"I think the problem with third movies is the people who are financing them are experts on how they should be made and what they should be. At that point, when you own a franchise like that, you want to get rid of any extraneous opinions."

— David Fincher, on contributing to a film series

In 2002, director David Fincher was slated to direct the next installment of the Mission: Impossible film series for a summer of 2004 release date. Fincher dropped out in favor of Zodiac (2007), later citing creative differences over the direction of the series. Joe Carnahan was chosen to replace Fincher; Carnahan worked on developing the film for fifteen months. Under his involvement, the film was to feature "Kenneth Branagh playing a guy who's based on Timothy McVeigh," as well as Carrie-Anne Moss and Scarlett Johansson in other roles. Moss would have played a new character named Leah Quint.

After a creative dispute, Carnahan quit in July 2004. Tom Cruise then called J. J. Abrams, offering the directorial role for the film after having binge-watched the first two seasons of Alias. Abrams ultimately signed on and production was delayed a year due to his contractual obligations with Alias and Lost. During this time, Branagh, Moss and Johansson departed from the project because of the many delays in production. Ricky Gervais was allegedly cast as Benjamin Dunn, but due to production delays, Gervais left the project due to scheduling conflicts with For Your Consideration (2006). Simon Pegg, who ended up playing the character and auditioned for it when Carnahan was attached, has since debunked this and claims that Gervais was meant to play a different character in the movie. Billy Bob Thornton was offered the role of Owen Davian, but he declined as he didn't want to be typecast as a villain. The role eventually went to Philip Seymour Hoffman. On June 8, 2005, Paramount Pictures gave the film the green light after a new cast of actors was hired and the film's budget was redeveloped, and Cruise took a major pay cut.

Abrams offered Martin Landau the opportunity to reprise his role as Rollin Hand in a small cameo appearance. However, Landau turned it down, disliking the direction the franchise was going and wanting a larger role. Thandiwe Newton declined returning for Mission: Impossible III.

=== Filming ===
Principal photography began in Rome, Italy on July 12, 2005, and ended in November. Location filming took place in China (Shanghai and Xitang), Germany (Berlin), Italy (Rome and Caserta), the United States (California, Virginia and Maryland) and Vatican City. The night scenes involving the skyscrapers were filmed in Shanghai, while some of the Shanghai filming was also done in Los Angeles.

=== Music ===
The film's musical score was composed by Michael Giacchino, conducted by Tim Simonec and performed by the Hollywood Studio Symphony. He is the third composer to take on the series, following Danny Elfman and Hans Zimmer. The score album was released on May 9, 2006, by Varèse Sarabande Records. Unlike the previous installments, no soundtrack album featuring the film's contemporary music was released. Despite this, the film features a song by Kanye West entitled "Impossible" that also features Twista, Keyshia Cole and BJ.

== Release ==
=== Marketing ===
To promote the film, Paramount rigged 4,500 randomly selected Los Angeles Times vending boxes with digital audio players which would play the theme song when the door was opened. The audio players did not always stay concealed. In many cases, they came loose and fell on top of the stack of newspapers in plain view, with the result that they were widely mistaken for bombs. Police bomb squads detonated a number of the vending boxes. They even temporarily shut down a veterans hospital in response to the apparent "threat." Despite these problems, Paramount and the Los Angeles Times opted to leave the audio players in the boxes until two days after the movie's opening.

=== Home media ===
Mission: Impossible III was released on DVD, HD DVD and Blu-ray on October 30, 2006, the first film by a studio to be released simultaneously in all three formats. A 4K UHD Blu-ray release occurred on June 26, 2018.

=== "Trapped in the Closet" controversy ===
A blog entry of Hollywoodinterrupted.com in March 2006 alleged that Viacom (parent of Paramount and Comedy Central) canceled the rebroadcast of the South Park episode "Trapped in the Closet" due to threats by Cruise to refuse to participate in the Mission: Impossible III publicity circle. These assertions were soon also reported by E! News and American Morning.

Fox News attributed threats from Cruise, stating, "to back out of his Mission: Impossible III promotional duties if Viacom didn't pull a repeat of the episode", as evidence of "bad blood" between Cruise and Viacom. The Washington Post reported that South Park fans "struck back", in March 2006, and threatened to boycott Mission: Impossible III until Comedy Central put "Trapped in the Closet" back on its schedule. Melissa McNamara of CBS News later questioned whether this boycott hurt the film's box office debut. Political blogger Andrew Sullivan encouraged a boycott of the film, based on claims that Cruise allegedly forced Comedy Central to censor a South Park episode about Scientologists. "Make sure you don't go see Paramount's Mission: Impossible III, Cruise's upcoming movie," Sullivan wrote. "I know you weren't going to see it anyway. But now any money you spend on this movie is a blow against freedom of speech. Boycott it. Tell your friends to boycott it."

When asked in ABC's Primetime about his involvement with stopping the episode rebroadcast on Comedy Central, Cruise stated, "First of all, could you ever imagine sitting down with anyone? I would never sit down with someone and question them on their beliefs. Here's the thing: I'm really not even going to dignify this. I honestly didn't really even know about it. I'm working, making my movie, I've got my family. I'm busy. I don't spend my days going, 'What are people saying about me?'"

== Reception ==
=== Box office ===
Opening in 4,054 theaters all across North America, the fourth-largest opening ever up to that point, behind Shrek 2, Spider-Man 2 and Madagascar, Mission: Impossible III topped the box office in its opening weekend ahead of RV. It was one of the only four films of 2006 to open in over 4,000 locations, with Over the Hedge, Superman Returns and Pirates of the Caribbean: Dead Man's Chest being the others. The film made US$16.6 million on its opening day and $47.7 million in its opening weekend, a solid opening yet almost $10 million lower than the franchise's previous films. It remained at number one with $25 million during its second weekend, ahead of Poseidon's gross of $22.2 million. The film remained in the Top 10 at the box office for the remainder of its first six weeks. It ended its initial domestic run on July 20, 2006, taking in a total of $134 million. It was the second movie in 2006 to pass the $100 million mark at the box office, following Ice Age: The Meltdown. The film's domestic gross was significantly lower than that of Mission: Impossible 2, and remains the lowest of the series as of 2025.

The film grossed $70 million outside the U.S. during its first five days (in some Asian countries, it opened two days before its North American release date). It was easily the box-office champion in many countries. Its international box-office gross reached $264.4 million for a combined worldwide gross of $398.5 million, the lowest of the series as of 2025.

In the Netherlands, the film debuted at No. 1 in the week of May 4–10, grossing a total of €532,384. The following week, the film remained in the top position. In its third, the film dropped to No. 2 and fell to No. 4 to the following week. Next, it maintained the No. 4 position to drop to No. 6 (in the week of June 6–14). In total, the film has grossed over €2,141,162.

=== Critical response ===
On review aggregation website Rotten Tomatoes, Mission: Impossible III holds an approval rating of 73% based on 248 reviews, with an average rating of 6.7/10. The site's critics consensus reads, "Fast-paced, with eye-popping stunts and special effects, the latest Mission: Impossible installment delivers everything an action fan could ask for. A thrilling summer popcorn flick." Metacritic gave the film a weighted average score of 66 out of 100 based on 42 critics, indicating "generally favorable reviews". Audiences polled by CinemaScore gave the film a grade of "A−" on an A+ to F scale, an improvement on the first two installments.

On the television show Ebert & Roeper, Richard Roeper gave Mission: Impossible III a "thumbs up," while Roger Ebert gave it a marginal "thumbs down." In Ebert's print review, he gave the film a score of two-and-a-half stars out of four, saying, "Either you want to see mindless action and computer-generated sequences executed with breakneck speed and technical precision, or you do not. I am getting to the point where I don't much care." He felt "surprised that the plot hangs together more than in the other two films."

Clint O'Connor of Cleveland Plain Dealer gave the film an "A" and wrote, "[J.J. Abrams] did not bother with such pedestrian concerns as character development and motivation. He simply concocted a first-person shooter video game disguised as a summer blockbuster. And this is the perfect summer-escape movie." Keith Phipps of The Onion's The A.V. Club said the film is "business as usual, but it's the best kind of business as usual, and it finds everyone working in top form." Owen Gleiberman of Entertainment Weekly called Mission: Impossible III "a gratifyingly clever, booby-trapped thriller that has enough fun and imagination and dash to more than justify its existence." Marc Savlov of The Austin Chronicle said that "it's all poppycock, of course, but it's done with such vim and vigor and both narrative and visual flair that you care not a jot." James Berardinelli of ReelViews gave the film a score of two-and-a-half stars out of four, saying that it "provides lots of action, but too little excitement."

Ian Nathan of Empire said that Mission: Impossible III has "an inspired middle-hour pumped by some solid action" but added that "we now live in a post-Bourne, recalibrated-Bond universe, where Ethan Hunt looks a bit lost." Manohla Dargis of The New York Times said that "Hoffman enlivens Mission: Impossible III" but criticized the film's "maudlin romance" and "Abrams's inability to adapt his small-screen talent to a larger canvas." Rob Nelson of the Dallas Observer said that "Abrams's movie is too oppressive, too enamored of its brutality to deliver anything like real thrills; its deeply unpleasant tone nearly makes you long even for [Mission: Impossible 2 director John] Woo's cartoon absurdities."

Claudia Puig of USA Today said that "Mission: Impossible III delivers" despite "a sense that the franchise is played out and its star over-exposed." Maitland McDonagh of TV Guide described the film as "breezy, undemanding, and a carefully balanced blend of the familiar and the not-quite-what-you-expected." Lawrence Toppman of The Charlotte Observer said that Mission: Impossible III is "plenty of fun" despite being "overwrought and overplotted."

Pete Vonder Haar of Film Threat said that "you may be mildly entertained, but damned if you'll remember any of it five minutes later." Stephanie Zacharek of Salon.com said that "Cruise is the single bright, blinking emblem of the failure of Mission: Impossible III." William Arnold of the Seattle Post-Intelligencer remarked that "the latest [Mission: Impossible film] is just this side of insultingly stupid." Shawn Levy of The Oregonian said that Mission: Impossible III "feels like one of the more forgettable James Bond films—saddled, moreover, with a star who's sliding into self-parody."
