= The Eye (2008 film) =

Film by David Moreau and Xavier Palud

- North American release poster
- Directed by: David Moreau; Xavier Palud
- Screenplay by: Sebastian Gutierrez
- Based on: The Eye (Jian gui) by Pang brothers Jo Jo Yuet-chun Hui
- Produced by: Paula Wagner; Don Granger; Michelle Manning
- Starring: Jessica Alba; Alessandro Nivola; Parker Posey; Rade Šerbedžija
- Cinematography: Jeffrey Jur
- Edited by: Patrick Lussier
- Music by: Marco Beltrami
- Production companies: Cruise/Wagner Productions; Vertigo Entertainment
- Distributed by: Lionsgate Paramount Vantage (United States); Maple Pictures (Canada)
- Release date: February 1, 2008
- Running time: 98 minutes
- Countries: United States; Canada
- Language: English
- Budget: $12 million
- Box office: $58 million

The Eye is a 2008 supernatural horror film directed by David Moreau and Xavier Palud, written by Sebastian Gutierrez, and starring Jessica Alba, Parker Posey, Alessandro Nivola, and Rade Šerbedžija. It is a remake of the Pang brothers' 2002 film of the same name. The plot centres around Sydney Wells, a violinist who undergoes a cornea transplantation surgery to regain her eyesight. Upon recovering from the operation, she sees terrifying visions from the alternate paranormal world. The film was released on February 1, 2008, and performed moderately well at the box office, grossing $58 million against its budget of $12 million, but was panned by critics, many of whom deemed it inferior to the original.

== Plot ==
Sydney Wells is a successful classical violinist from Los Angeles who has been blind since she was five years old, caused by an accident with firecrackers. Fifteen years later, after celebrating conductor and pianist Simon McCullough's birthday during rehearsal, Sydney undergoes a cornea transplant, which causes her eyesight to return. While a bit blurry at first, as time passes, Sydney's vision begins to clear; however, she also begins experiencing terrifying visions, mostly of fire and people dying. She also sees people who are already dead: on one occasion, a girl passes right through her. Sydney attempts to unravel the mystery of the visions and convince others, primarily her visual therapist and fellow violinist, Paul Faulkner, who helps her in her quest. She knows that she is not going insane.

Accompanied by Paul, Sydney travels to Mexico, where the cornea donor Ana Cristina Martinez was originally from. She discovers from Ana's mother that the images of fire and death are the result of an industrial accident that Ana foretold. Ana hanged herself because she was unable to stop the accident. Sydney forgives Ana's spirit, who leaves in peace. As Sydney and Paul begin their journey home, they are caught in traffic congestion caused by a police chase on the other side of the border. Sydney sees the little girl from her vision in the car beside her. She then realizes that this is what her vision has been all along: to save the people who are about to die from an accident.

Still able to see the silhouettes of death, Sydney gets everyone off the highway, starting with a bus filled with people. She and Paul convince everyone to leave the bus and the cars by telling them that there is a bomb inside the bus. However, a driver leading the police chase rushes through the border barriers and collides with a tank truck, igniting leaking gasoline in the process. Sydney sees the little girl trapped in the car, her mother lying on the ground in front of it, already being hit by a passenger and losing consciousness. Paul breaks open the window and gets the girl out. Paul and Sydney carry the girl and her mother to safety just before the tank truck causes a chain explosion. Sydney is blinded by flying glass fragments in the process.

After recovering at a hospital, she returns to Los Angeles to continue performing as a blind violinist, though with a more optimistic view of her condition.

== Cast ==
- Jessica Alba as Sydney Wells, a violinist who regains her vision after being blind since childhood
- Parker Posey as Helen Wells, Sydney's sister
- Alessandro Nivola as Paul Faulkner
- Rade Šerbedžija as Simon McCullough
- Obba Babatundé as Dr. Hawkins
- Tamlyn Tomita as Miss Cheung
- Fernanda Romero as Ana Cristina Martinez
- Rachel Ticotin as Rosa Martinez
- Chloë Grace Moretz as Alicia Milstone

== Production ==
Remake rights to the Pang brothers' original 2002 Hong Kong film, The Eye, were purchased by Cruise/Wagner Productions.

The band Blaqk Audio provided instrumental versions of the songs, "Between Breaths" and "The Love Letter" that were used in trailers and on the official website for the 2008 film. In response to the buzz it created, Jade Puget of the electronic duo suggested a possible public release of all the CexCells songs in instrumental form.

Alba spent much time with the blind soprano Jessica Bachicha to learn about how blind people lived, used the white cane, read Braille, etc.

This American remake follows Naina, a Hindi movie released in 2005, that is also based on the Pang Brothers' film.

=== Filming ===
The filming was done primarily in Albuquerque, New Mexico, and the surrounding areas. Sets were created using much of the downtown metro area, Sydney's apartment was built on a sound stage and was also filmed in Albuquerque. Exteriors were shot to look like the Downtown Los Angeles area. The establishing hospital shots — wherein Sydney is supposed to have had her sight-restoring surgery — are of Los Angeles General Medical Center in the Boyle Heights district; 3/4 shots looking north- and southeast of the main 18-floor-high central building (the same building used for the television soap-opera General Hospital). Fictionally, the burned-out Chinese restaurant is supposed to be located just three-blocks from where Sydney lives; the exterior scene, in which Sydney is about to get into a taxicab and travel to Mexico, was filmed on 7th Street, just east of Figueroa, in the downtown area. Shots of Dr. Faulkner's office building are of the Forestry building at the University of British Columbia (UBC). Several other scenes, including outdoor shots, were shot in Albuquerque.

== Reception ==
=== Critical reception ===
On the review aggregator website Rotten Tomatoes, 22% of 76 critics' reviews are positive, with an average rating of 4.3/10. The website's consensus reads: "Featuring wooden performances and minimal scares, The Eye is another tedious remake of an Asian horror film." Metacritic, which uses a weighted average, assigned the film a score of 36 out of 100, based on 13 critics, indicating "generally unfavorable" reviews. Audiences polled by CinemaScore gave the film an average grade of "B−" on an A+ to F scale.

Jessica Alba's performance was generally criticized as well; Jeannette Catsoulis of The New York Times called it "vapid".

Alba was nominated for a Golden Raspberry Award for Worst Actress for the film. However, she won the Choice Movie Actress: Horror/Thriller award at the 2008 Teen Choice Awards for her performance in the film.

=== Box office ===
The film opened in second place at the U.S. box office with $12.4 million. As of August 10, 2011, the film has a domestic gross of $31,418,697 with a foreign gross of $25,545,945 totaling an international gross of $56,964,642. In the United Kingdom, it grossed $1,398,958 in its opening weekend at #2.

=== Accolades ===
Year	Award/Festival	Category	Recipient(s)	Result
2008	Fright Meter Awards	Best Supporting Actress	Parker Posey	Nominated
2008	Golden Trailer Awards	Best Thriller	The Eye	Nominated
2008	Golden Trailer Awards	Best Horror Poster	The Eye	Won
2008	Teen Choice Awards	Choice Movie: Horror/Thriller Actress	Jessica Alba	Won
2009	Golden Raspberry Awards	Worst Actress	Jessica Alba	Nominated

== Home media ==
The film was released on DVD and Blu-ray on June 3, 2008.

== See also ==
- Body memory
- Kokila, a 1990 Telugu movie with a similar plot
- Naina, 2005 Hindi movie based on a similar story, starring Urmila Matondkar
