= Kenny Moore (runner) =

American long-distance runner and journalist (1943–2022)

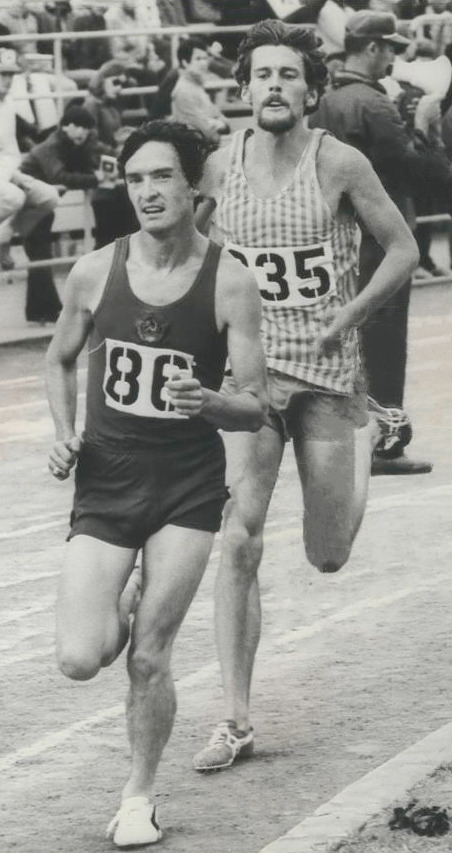
- Moore (right) in 1971

Personal information
- Born: December 1, 1943 Portland, Oregon, U.S.
- Died: May 4, 2022 (aged 78) Kailua, Hawaii, U.S.
- Height: 183 cm (6 ft 0 in)
- Weight: 64 kg (141 lb)

Sport
- Sport: Athletics
- Event(s): Mile to marathon, steeplechase
- Club: Oregon Track Club; University of Oregon

Achievements and titles
- Personal best(s): Mile – 4:04.2 (1966); 3000 m – 8:49.4 (1966); 5000 m – 13:46.4 (1970); 10000 m – 28:47.6 (1970); Mar – 2:11:36 (1970)

Kenneth Clark Moore (December 1, 1943 – May 4, 2022) was an American Olympic road running athlete, journalist and actor. He ran the marathon at the 1968 and 1972 Summer Olympics, finishing fourth at the latter.

== Early life ==
Moore was born in Portland, Oregon, on December 1, 1943. He attended North Eugene High School in Eugene, Oregon. He went on to study at the University of Oregon, where he raced for the Oregon Ducks under coach Bill Bowerman. He received All-American honors on three occasions and was pivotal to the Ducks winning the team national championship at the 1964 and 1965 NCAA University Division Outdoor Track and Field Championships.

== Running career ==
After graduating from Oregon, Moore won the 1967 USA Cross Country Championships, as well as the USA Marathon Championships four years later. He also won the San Francisco Bay to Breakers – the largest footrace in the world – six times in a row from 1968 to 1973, becoming the all-time leader in victories in the race.

Moore first competed in the Olympic marathon at the 1968 Summer Games. He led early in the final, but finished fourteenth after suffering from severe blisters. It was still the best performance among American competitors. He joined the U.S. Army later that year, but was permitted to continue racing. He set the record for best time among American runners at the Fukuoka Marathon in 1969 and 1970, finishing runner-up in the latter race. Upon completing his military service, he returned to the University of Oregon and graduated with a Master of Fine Arts in creative writing in 1972. He again participated in the marathon at the Summer Olympics that year. Although he tripped and fell one mile into the race, he recovered and narrowly missed winning a medal, finishing fourth.

== Later life ==
After retiring from competition, Moore became a journalist and screenwriter. He had a 25-year career covering athletics for Sports Illustrated. At the end of his career at Sports Illustrated, Moore took up the plight of former competitor Mamo Wolde, who was falsely imprisoned in Ethiopia. In his story, Moore championed Wolde's release from prison, a release that came months before Wolde's death.

Moore was also one of the athletes who pushed for the Amateur Sports Act of 1978. He also helped to write the screenplay for the 1998 biopic Without Limits, a film about former Oregon Ducks standout Steve Prefontaine. Moore also had an acting role (as a water polo player) in the 1982 Robert Towne film Personal Best, starring Mariel Hemingway, Scott Glenn, and Patrice Donnelly. Stanley Kauffmann of The New Republic wrote Moore "looks like the youngest mummy in screen history".

Moore published a book in 2007 about his former coach titled Bowerman and the Men of Oregon. He was also the author of Best Efforts: World Class Runners and Races (Doubleday 1982). He was inducted into the University of Oregon Athletic Hall of Fame in 1997. He was later honored in the Oregon Sports Hall of Fame in 2019.

In a Sports Illustrated feature on Eamonn Coghlan, Moore alluded to his own Olympic disappointment with a quote from the Irish world record holder: "You know, fourth is the absolute worst place to finish in the Olympics."

== Personal life ==
Moore married his first wife, Roberta (Bobbie) Conlan, in 1968. She was photographed embracing him at the finish line of the 1972 Olympic marathon. They divorced in 1979. He subsequently married Connie Johnston Moore, and remained married to her until his death. They resided in Hawaii during his later years.

Moore died on May 4, 2022, in Kailua, Hawaii. He was 78 years old.
