= Partners (1993 film) =

1993 film

- Title card
- Directed by: Peter Weller
- Written by: Thomas McGuane; Ebbe Roe Smith; Peter Weller
- Produced by: Thom Colwell; Bob Degus; Jana Sue Memel
- Starring: Graham Beckel; Griffin Dunne; Charles Fleischer; Marg Helgenberger; Joseph Maher
- Cinematography: John J. Campbell
- Release date: 1993
- Running time: 36 minutes
- Country: United States
- Language: English

Partners is a 1993 American short film directed by Peter Weller. The film is about a junior partner in a law firm who discovers that the wife of an important client was a former college sweetheart of his.

== Cast ==
- Graham Beckel as Terry Bidwell
- Griffin Dunne as Dean Robinson
- Charles Fleischer as Evan Crow
- Marg Helgenberger as Georgeanne Bidwell
- Joseph Maher as Edward Hooper

== Reception ==
Partners was nominated for the Academy Award for Best Live Action Short Film at the 66th Academy Awards ceremony.
