= Deal of the Century =

1983 film by William Friedkin

- Theatrical release poster by John Alvin
- Directed by: William Friedkin
- Written by: Paul Brickman
- Produced by: Bud Yorkin
- Starring: Chevy Chase; Sigourney Weaver; Gregory Hines
- Cinematography: Richard H. Kline
- Edited by: Jere Huggins; Ned Humphreys; Bud S. Smith
- Music by: Arthur B. Rubinstein
- Distributed by: Warner Bros. Pictures
- Release date: November 4, 1983
- Running time: 99 minutes
- Country: United States
- Language: English
- Budget: $10 million
- Box office: $10.4 million (U.S.)

Deal of the Century is a 1983 American comedy film directed by William Friedkin and starring Chevy Chase, Gregory Hines, and Sigourney Weaver.

The film follows the adventures of several arms dealers that compete to sell weapons to a South American dictator.

== Plot ==
Eddie Muntz is a small-time American arms dealer who talks his way into a job with a large defense corporation selling high-tech military unmanned aerial vehicles to a mentally unstable South American dictator. Muntz arrives in war-torn and impoverished "San Miguel" to sell weapons to both its leader and the rebels seeking his ousting.

In the middle of a sales pitch to the rebels, Muntz is caught in a firefight and is shot in the foot. Hobbling in a rundown hotel days later, Muntz meets Harold DeVoto, a sales rep for the American defense contractor, Luckup.

Muntz peddles small arms (assault rifles, anti-personnel mines, and machine-pistols disguised as cassette tape players), whereas Luckup's product is more sophisticated—the Peacemaker UAV, a military drone that operates without pilots or airbases. But the military junta of San Miguel strings DeVoto along, driving the man to suicide. Muntz successfully takes over the deal and wins a contract worth millions.

On returning to the United States, he is angrily confronted at gunpoint by Catherine, Harold's widow. Demanding the contract, Catherine shoots Muntz instead, reopening the wound on his foot. Waking up in the hospital, Muntz is told by Frank Stryker, a Luckup executive, that San Miguel reneged on the deal after a disastrous and highly publicized demonstration of the Peacemaker.

Muntz nevertheless decides to help Luckup re-sign San Miguel. He is joined by his partner, Ray Kasternak, an ex-fighter pilot now undergoing a religious crisis of conscience, and also by Catherine. Muntz's efforts are complicated by tensions with Luckup, Ray's religious conversion, "The Peacemaker's" many technical glitches, and his own growing moral reservations.

On the eve of a major defense industry exposition, Muntz is visited by Massagi, an immensely wealthy arms merchant who both encourages him to finalize the San Miguel deal and coaches him on how to do it. Massagi reveals that the global arms industry has a stake in sales of weapons like the Peacemaker because they allow for localized and conventional wars that will keep their business viable into the next century. Massagi also explains how recent changes to federal law not only legalize bribes to foreign dictators, but make those bribes tax deductible. These revelations spur Muntz on, while also adding to his unease.

Muntz accompanies San Miguel's dictator to the weapons expo, where billions of dollars of high technology are displayed and demonstrated. To the dictators, Muntz disparages any warplanes he sees, reminding them of the obvious benefits of pilot-less aircraft.

While Muntz demonstrates some of his own wares (including a booby-trapped urinal), Ray hijacks one of the fighter jets being demonstrated, threatening to attack the expo, also daring them to attack him. Ray circles overhead as representatives for defense contractors bicker among themselves as to whose weapons are good enough to shoot him down.

Stryker takes matters into his own hands, launching the Peacemaker. This time, the UAV proves a much more formidable threat, and not even Ray can destroy it. Misusing all of the Peacemaker's weapons, however, Stryker instead destroys the entire expo. Before he can try again for Ray, Muntz uses his cane to shut off the Peacemaker's remote control panel, allowing Ray to destroy it.

In the final scene, we learn that Ray has left the arms industry to become a missionary. Muntz is also out of weapons trafficking, but still a salesman working at his brother's used car dealership. He sells Catherine a car, and it is implied that they will be doing other deals together.

== Cast ==
- Chevy Chase as Eddie Muntz
- Gregory Hines as Ray Kasternak
- Sigourney Weaver as Catherine DeVoto
- Vince Edwards as Frank Stryker
- Wallace Shawn as Harold DeVoto
- Richard Libertini as Kayhim Massagi
- William Marquez as Gen. Cordosa
- Eduardo Ricard as Col. Salgado
- Richard Herd as Lyle
- Graham Jarvis as Babers
- Randi Brooks as Gloria Della Rosa
- Ebbe Roe Smith as Bob
- Ray Manzarek as Charlie Simbo
- John Reilly as Swain

=== Uncredited ===
- Jack Angel as the voice of the Announcer

== Release ==
The film was released theatrically in the United States by Warner Bros. Pictures on November 4, 1983. It grossed $10,369,581 at the domestic box office.

The film was released on DVD by Warner Home Video in 2006. It was reissued by the Warner Archive Collection in 2014.

== Reception ==
Deal of the Century was poorly received by critics, as the film holds a 10% rating on Rotten Tomatoes from 10 reviews. Roger Ebert, rating the film two stars, stated that the film was "all episode, no structure; all hijinks and no discipline to provide framework for the jokes." Audiences polled by CinemaScore gave the film an average grade of "C-" on an A+ to F scale.
