= Jana Sue Memel =

American film director and film producer

Jana Sue Memel (born 7 March 1955, Los Angeles) is an American Academy Award-winning film producer, film director and writer, best known for her films Ray’s Male Heterosexual Dance Hall (1987) and Lieberman in Love (1995) that won Oscars in 1988 and 1996 respectively both in the category “Live Action Short Film”. She has produced over 25 movies and over 65 life-action shorts, some of which won Writers Guild and Director Guild Awards, Emmys, CableACE Awards and the Humanitas Prize. Currently she is communications consultant founder of “The Hollywood Way” and Executive Director of the Schools of Entertainment at Academy of Art University in San Francisco.

== Life and career ==
Jana Sue Memel was born on 7 March 1955 in Los Angeles. She graduated from USC Gould School of Law, but spent only six month in the practice of law, becoming a Hollywood agent. As an agent she specialized in representing first-time writers and directors, but then she moved into the ranks of independent producers.

In 1986 Memel along with a producer Jonathan Sanger founded the Chanticleer Film’s Discovery Program. Chanticleer Films has produced numerous short films for Showtime as well as the full-length “Lush Life”. Ray’s Male Heterosexual Dance Hall (1987), the very first film produced by Chanticleer, won an Academy Award in the Live Action Short Film category. Two other nominations in the same category Memel received in 1993 together with Jonathan Darby for film Contact (1992) and in 1994 together Peter Weller for Partners (1993). In 1995 four of the five films nominated in the Live Action Short Film category were Chanticleer Films productions. Year later, in 1996, Memel won her second Academy Award together with Christine Lahti again in the category Live Action Short Film for the love story Lieberman in Love (1995).

Memel produced over 25 movies and over 65 life-action shorts, some of which won Writers Guild and Director Guild Awards, Emmys, CableACE Awards and the Humanitas Prize. In total she has been nominated 11 times for her short films and three of those nominations turned into wins. Memel has also produced numerous television shows. Memel made three films as a film director: action drama Champion (2000), science-fiction comedy Random - Nothing is as it seems (2001) and the documentary short film You Can Do This Parents (2016).

Since 2007 Memel is communications consultant founder of “The Hollywood Way”. She is also Executive Director of the Schools of Entertainment at Academy of Art University in San Francisco.

Memel has three daughters.

== Filmography (selected) ==
Films:

- 1998 Everything That Rises (co-executive producer)
- 1996 Desert's Edge (executive producer)
- 1995 Lieberman in Love (director)
- 1995 Take out the Beast (executive producer)
- 1995 Down Came a Blackbird (executive producer)
- 1995 Contact (executive producer)
- 1994 Partners (executive producer)
- 1994 Two over Easy (executive producer)
- 1994 Texan (executive producer)
- 1994 On Hope (executive producer)
- 1994 Leslie's Folly (executive producer)
- 1994 Override (executive producer)
- 1993 12.01 (executive producer)
- 1993 Lush Life (executive producer)
- 1993 A Hard Rain (executive producer)
- 1993 Witness (executive producer)
- 1993 The Day My Parents Ran Away (executive producer)
- 1993 So I Married an Axe Murderer (co-producer)
- 1992 Without a Pass (executive producer)
- 1989 Teach 109 (producer)
- 1989 Private Debts (producer)
- 1987 Ray's Male Heterosexual Dance Hall (producer)
- 1986 Tough Guys (co-producer)
