= Code Name: Emerald =

- Theatrical release poster
- Directed by: Jonathan Sanger
- Written by: Ronald Bass
- Produced by: Martin Starger
- Starring: Ed Harris; Max von Sydow; Horst Buchholz; Helmut Berger; Cyrielle Clair; Eric Stoltz
- Cinematography: Freddie Francis
- Edited by: Stu Linder
- Music by: John Addison
- Production companies: Metro-Goldwyn-Mayer; NBC Productions
- Distributed by: MGM/UA Entertainment Co.
- Release date: September 27, 1985
- Running time: 95 minutes
- Country: United States
- Language: English
- Box office: $561,548

Code Name: Emerald (also known as Deep Cover) is a 1985 American war drama film about a spy for the Allies working undercover in Nazi Germany during World War II. The film was directed by Jonathan Sanger, and stars Ed Harris, Max von Sydow, Eric Stoltz, and Patrick Stewart. It was the first theatrical film produced by NBC.

== Plot ==
During World War II, Nazi Germany is aware of Operation Overlord, but is unaware of the date and landing sites. German Army Colonel Brausch, Gestapo agent Hoffman, and S.S. member Ritter repeatedly fail to learn when Operation Overlord will happen. Brausch offers to use his spy, Gus Lang (codename Emerald), but is unaware that Emerald is a double agent still working for the Allies; he passes fake details of a D-Day rehearsal ship and suggests dispatching E-boats to intercept it.

Lang's superior, Colonel Peters, decides to stage a real D-Day rehearsal at Omaha Beach. Peters refuses to inform the military of his intelligence scheme, confessing to Lang that he is protecting the identity of a high-level Nazi spy. The German E-boats attack the rehearsal, killing and capturing several Allied soldiers, including Andy Wheeler, a U.S. Army signalman who has intimate knowledge of Operation Overlord. Wheeler is interrogated at Gestapo HQ, an old castle in Paris, where Lang is tasked with befriending him and is authorised to kill Wheeler. To prevent Wheeler from being tortured, Lang passes along Wheeler's medical records, which have been falsified by British Intelligence to include a cardiac arrhythmia.

Lang parachutes into France and meets his French Resistance contact Henri, who drives him to Paris in his fishmonger's van and instructs him how to secretly relay his reports to England. Meanwhile, Wheeler undergoes psychological torture and is introduced to Lang, who is posing as a fellow American prisoner. Lang goes to meet his contact Claire Jouvet, who poses as his lover but later develops an authentic romance with. While in her apartment, the two witness her elderly neighbors being arrested by the Nazis. As Lang begins befriending Wheeler, Ritter becomes suspicious of and investigates Claire's background. Ritter arrests the absent father of her son, Duchelle, and learns of her links to the resistance and Jewish ancestry, which Hoffman brushes off as trivial.

Lang learns of a decoy location, but tells Brausch, Hoffman, and Ritter that he needs a private conversation with Wheeler to verify its intelligence, which they grant. There, Lang confesses to Wheeler that he is a double agent by telling him the real landing point. He instructs Wheeler to reveal that the assault will be led by the decoy battalion FUSAG in early July, a month later than the actual date. Hoffman and Ritter become increasingly suspicious of Lang, and Hoffman discovers Wheeler's unaltered medical record. Ritter tells Wheeler that they know his medical record has been falsified and shows him a photo of Lang and Claire socializing with Nazis.

Brausch calls Lang to a secret meeting in a church, revealing that he is the spy whom Colonel Peters was protecting. Brausch warns Lang of the Gestapo's suspicions of Claire and the Nazi's knowledge of the medical records. He tells Lang that Hoffman will move against him, but his paranoia of betrayal will make him act alone. During a picnic with Claire and Lang, Hoffman tells Lang that his cover is blown, but Claire kills him. After, they plan to rendezvous at an airfield to extract Wheeler.

Lang resumes his cover and hands Brausch a document forged by Claire which removes Ritter's authority and charges Lang to bring Wheeler to Calais. As Brausch reads the orders, Ritter arrives in protest, but Lang knocks him out. As the officers telephone for personal confirmation from Hoffman, Lang and Brausch walk Wheeler to the staff car. Despite Lang's protests, Brausch refuses to be extracted, planning to buy time for Lang and Wheeler to escape. The Gestapo HQ's alarms are sounded, and the two are picked up by Henri. At the airfield, the rescue pilot urges Claire to leave, as they can wait no longer for Lang and Wheeler. Resigned, Claire boards the plane with her son, but the fish van arrives at the last moment. Once in the air and heading for England, Lang and Claire kiss passionately, making Wheeler smile. The film ends with brief real footage and commentary of the D-Day landings on 6 June 1944.

== Cast ==
- Ed Harris as Augustus "Gus" Lang
- Max von Sydow as Jurgen Brausch
- Horst Buchholz as Walter Hoffman
- Cyrielle Clair as Claire Jouvet
- Helmut Berger as Ernst Ritter
- Eric Stoltz as Lieutenant Andy Wheeler
- Patrick Stewart as Col. Peters
- Graham Crowden as Sir Geoffrey Macklin
- Peter Bonke as Johann
- Tony Rohr as Patrick Callaghan
- Ray Armstrong as Willoughby
- George Mikell as Major Seltz
- Julie Jézéquel as Jasmine
- Katia Tchenko as Marie Claude
- Ed Wiley as Sal
- Jenny Clève as Madame Farrel
- Vincent Grass as Tracker
