= Down Came a Blackbird =

- Promotional poster
- Genre: Drama
- Written by: Kevin Droney
- Directed by: Jonathan Sanger
- Starring: Raul Julia; Laura Dern; Vanessa Redgrave
- Music by: Roger Mason; Graeme Revell
- Country of origin: United States
- Original language: English

Production
- Executive producers: Thom Colwell; Laura Dern; Jana Sue Memel
- Producer: Patrick Whitley
- Production location: Toronto
- Cinematography: Kees Van Oostrum
- Editor: Toni Morgan
- Running time: 113 minutes
- Production companies: All Media Inc. Chanticleer Films; Showtime Networks

Original release
- Network: Showtime
- Release: October 22, 1995

Down Came a Blackbird is a 1995 American made for TV drama film directed by Jonathan Sanger and starring Raul Julia, Laura Dern, and Vanessa Redgrave. It was the final film appearance of Julia, filmed in October 1994. Julia died two weeks after production finished and a year before its release.

== Plot ==
Tomás Ramírez (Raul Julia) is a professor who joins a clinic run by Anna Lenke (Vanessa Redgrave), a Holocaust survivor, psychologist and the clinic's proprietor, whose patients are also recovering Holocaust and torture victims. Among them is Helen McNulty (Laura Dern), a journalist who was kidnapped and tortured by the death squads of an unidentified Central American country controlled by a dictatorship.

After some time Helen grows close to Ramírez, but she begins having suspicions after three men attempt to detain Ramírez while he and Helen are on a date. Helen is able to photograph one of the assailants and sends the picture to a colleague for possible identification. Some time later, during one of the Scotch-fueled late night conversations between Helen and Ramírez, the latter talks about a childhood friend who was an officer in the army of his home country; Ramírez portrays his friend as a man who followed orders without questioning the morality of them, preferring to go along with his superiors in order to protect his family.

Helen and Ramírez start a romantic relationship and Ramírez helps Helen overcome her fear of water and swimming, which was a consequence of the trauma she endured after being tortured by the dictatorship. Eventually, Helen's colleague contacts the person in the picture and arranges a meeting where the man and his two associates identify themselves as police agents from Ramirez's home country. They inform McNulty that Ramírez is a fugitive and wanted for torture in the Central American country where he and Helen both lived, and where democracy has returned.

Back at group therapy session in the clinic, Helen violently confronts Ramírez with the revelation of his true identity, and Ramírez confesses that the childhood friend he spoke of was really himself. Dr. Lenke and the patients escort Ramírez out of the clinic, where the police takes him into custody. Before being driven away, Helen asks Ramírez why he came to the clinic, and he explains that he wanted to escape his past and deal with the guilt and shame of his actions, and then says to her: "you made me forget".

As the police car drives away, Anna comforts Helen and they go back inside the clinic so they can continue and eventually finish Helen's treatment.

== Cast ==
- Raul Julia as Professor Tomas Ramirez
- Laura Dern as Helen McNulty
- Vanessa Redgrave as Anna Lenke
- Cliff Gorman as Nick "The Greek"
- Sarita Choudhury as Myrna
- Jay O. Sanders as Jan Talbeck
- Jeffrey DeMunn as Rob Rubenstein
- L. Scott Caldwell as Cerise
- Falconer Abraham as Kouadio
- Von Flores as Minh
- Amanda Smith as Professor's Wife
- Miguel Fernandez as Captain Alonso Delacrux
- Carlo Rota as Sergeant Manuel Ortega
- James Kidnie as Secret Police Agent
- Christian Vidosa as Head Torturer
- Angel Jara as Torturer #1
- Ramon Marroquin as Torturer #2
- Henry Perez as Torturer #3
- Osman Aboubakr as Torturer #4 (uncredited)
