= Narc (film) =

2002 film by Joe Carnahan

- American theatrical release poster
- Directed by: Joe Carnahan
- Written by: Joe Carnahan
- Produced by: Diane Nabatoff; Ray Liotta; Michelle Grace; Julius R. Nasso
- Starring: Jason Patric; Ray Liotta; Busta Rhymes; Chi McBride
- Cinematography: Alex Nepomniaschy
- Edited by: John Gilroy
- Music by: Cliff Martinez
- Production companies: Lions Gate Films; Cruise/Wagner Productions; Splendid Pictures; Emmett/Furla Films; Tiara Blu Films
- Distributed by: Paramount Pictures (Note: Paramount Pictures held the distribution rights across North America, the UK (United Kingdom), Ireland, Australia, New Zealand, Spain, and Japan, with Lions Gate Films International handling theatrical and home media release in all other global markets (International).)
- Release dates: January 14, 2002 (Sundance); December 20, 2002 (limited); January 10, 2003 (wide)
- Running time: 105 minutes
- Country: United States
- Language: English
- Budget: $6.5 million
- Box office: $12.6 million

Narc is a 2002 American neo-noir crime thriller film written and directed by Joe Carnahan, and starring Jason Patric and Ray Liotta (who also co-produced). The plot revolves around the efforts of two police detectives in search of the murderer of an undercover police officer. As they investigate, they engage in unethical behavior and uncover dark secrets that will challenge their fragile relationship.

The film premiered at the 2002 Sundance Film Festival, where it was nominated for the Grand Jury Prize. It received a limited release by Paramount Pictures and Lions Gate Films on December 20, 2002, before expanding to a wide release on January 10, 2003. It was well-received by critics and a financial success, earning three Independent Spirit Award nominations, including Best Director.

== Plot ==
Undercover narcotics officer Nick Tellis chases a drug dealer through the streets of Detroit. Tellis shoots and kills the dealer when he holds a child hostage, but a stray bullet hits the child's pregnant mother, causing her to miscarry.

18 months later, Tellis is tasked with investigating the murder of an undercover officer, Michael Calvess. Tellis reluctantly agrees to take the case on two conditions: that he will get a desk job if he secures a conviction, and that he is partnered with Detective Henry Oak, whom Tellis has read about in the Calvess case file. The police chief accepts Tellis' conditions, but warns him about Oak's instability.

During their first meeting, Oak reveals to Tellis his belief that the Detroit Police Department wants the Calvess case buried and it is all about politics. The detectives visit the scene where a drug dealer has been shot dead in his bathtub; Tellis surmises the death was accidental and self-inflicted. Tellis notes that the shotgun at the scene is a SWAT weapon with the serial number filed off.

While the partners have a discussion about family, Oak recalls a drug bust decades prior, where he found a ten-year-old girl who was being sold into prostitution by her stepfather, resulting in Oak beating the man; he sees parallels with the current case. Tellis visits Calvess' widow Kathryn, and asks about her relationship with her husband while he was on the street. Oak, who is protective of Calvess' family, turns up at the house and angrily confronts Tellis.

The detectives next visit the home of a man involved in Tellis' shooting. Although they find no evidence to suggest he murdered Calvess, they find another officer's badge on the premises. The man pulls a gun and wounds Tellis before Oak kills him in self-defense. The assailant is determined to be Calvess' killer and the case is closed. However, Tellis and Oak are furious as they believe the killer has yet to be found and continue to investigate independently.

When the detectives visit an auto body shop, Oak attempts to force a confession out of a pair of suspects. Tellis is increasingly suspicious of Oak's tactics. He finds police-issue guns in a car belonging to one of the suspects, including one that belonged to Calvess. Oak beats both men until Tellis tells him to get CSI tools from the car. When Oak leaves the room, Tellis locks the door and asks for the truth from the suspects.

The suspects explain that Calvess, who had fallen into drug addiction, blew Tellis' cover 18 months before and caused the shooting. On the day of the murder, Calvess tried to deal with the two dealers, but it went badly. According to their story, Oak arrived, having trailed Calvess to confirm rumors that he was an addict. Calvess went for his weapon, which was the dealers' justification for attacking him. The two men ran off as Oak shot at them, then executed Calvess himself. Tellis confronts Oak, but he denies the murder. Tellis then raises the issue of Oak's relationship with Kathryn.

Kathryn was the ten-year-old girl who was pimped out by her stepfather. Oak considers her the daughter he never had and has remained close. He has been protecting her by covering up crimes she committed in her teenage years. Tellis tells Oak he will make the arrest and Oak beats him with the shotgun and resumes brutalizing the dealers.

Oak turns the tape recorder on and attempts to beat a confession out of the men, threatening to shoot them. Tellis breaks into their car, retrieves a gun, calls for back-up, and re-enters the building. He shoots Oak when Oak refuses to put his gun down. Tellis moves to aid Oak and, realizing he's dying, pleads for the truth of what happened the night Calvess died.

Oak explains that Calvess shot at the dealers as they fled from Oak, leaving the shoulder wound. Oak argued with him, explaining that he had had enough of defending Calvess and would turn him in to the department. In despair, Calvess shot himself. Oak had been protecting his name and family so Calvess' wife could receive his pension. Oak's motive was to convict the dealers, whom he felt had made Calvess a junkie. Oak dies in Tellis' arms, leaving the confession on tape and Tellis with only moments to decide what to do with it.

== Cast ==
- Jason Patric as Detective Nick Tellis
- Ray Liotta as Lieutenant Henry Oak
- Chi McBride as Captain Cheevers
- Busta Rhymes as Darnell "Big D Love" Beery
- Anne Openshaw as Kathryn Calvess
  - Stacey Farber as young Kathryn
- Richard Chevolleau as Latroy Steeds
- John Ortiz as Octavio Ruiz
- Karen Robinson as Liz Detmer
- Alan van Sprang as Detective Michael Calvess
- Krista Bridges as Audrey Tellis
- A.C. Peterson as Freeman Franks
- Lina Giornofelice as Jeanine Mueller
- Carly Marie Alves as Lilian Rose Calvess
- Donna Croce as Sarah Oak
- Paulino Nunes as Officer Ellis Breaver
- Thomas Patrice as Officer Marcotte
- Tony De Santis as Dr. Art Harlan
- Bishop Brigante as Eugene "Deacon" Sheps
- Carson Durven as Leonard "Leo Lee" Leflore
- Lloyd Adams as Walter Dandridge
- Booth Savage as Cecil Mitchum
- Dan Leis as Elvin Dowd
- Kevin Rushton and Darren John as Dealers

== Production ==
=== Development ===
The script for Narc originated from a short film made by Joe Carnahan while a student at San Francisco State University. The script was pitched as "a raw cop drama in the tradition of the 70's films of Sidney Lumet and William Friedkin." The script failed to generate interest, with Carnahan saying financiers told him, "This is an N.Y.P.D. Blue episode. Nobody cares about the cop genre anymore."

The script eventually ended up in the hands of Ray Liotta, who had then just switched over to Endeavor, the same talent agency as Carnahan. ”I was looking for a movie that would have some impact, or at least make some cash,'' Liotta said. The actor set up a meeting with Carnahan, and, impressed with the director’s passion for the film, agreed to both star in and produce it.

For a year, the film struggled to find full financing as it was a violent cop movie with no marquee names. Finally, an independent company called Cutting Edge Entertainment agreed to produce Narc and principal photography got underway in 2000.

=== Filming ===
Beginning February 2000, Narc was shot in 27 days in Toronto, with one day of location shooting in Detroit. When the low-budget production was running low on funding two weeks into filming, the film’s producers and director persuaded 17 investors to fund the project so filming could be completed. The 17 people earned producer credits on the film.

== Release ==
The film had its world premiere at the 2002 Sundance Film Festival. It nearly did not secure a theatrical distribution deal and almost went direct-to-video; however the film was circulated amongst industry figures and actors like Dustin Hoffman, Warren Beatty, Harrison Ford, and William Friedkin, all of whom praised the film. In March 2002, Tom Cruise and his producing partner Paula Wagner screened the film and were so enthusiastic about it that they agreed to come on board as executive producers. The following month, Cruise's support led to Paramount Pictures making a $3 million-deal to distribute the film theatrically during awards season; the studio had already expressed considerable interest in the film following its Sundance premiere.

=== Box office ===
Narc had its premiere in Beverly Hills on December 17, 2002, before receiving a limited release in six theaters on December 20, 2002, grossing $63,303 with an average of $10,550 per theater and ranking #45 at the box office. The film then had its wide release in 822 theaters on January 10, 2003 and grossed $2,825,807 with an average of $3,437 per theater and ranking #12. The film ended up earning $10,465,659 domestically and $2,168,088 internationally for a total of $12,633,747, doubling its $6.5 million production budget.

== Reception ==
Narc received positive reviews from critics and has a rating of 84% on Rotten Tomatoes based on 158 reviews with an average score of 7.13 out of 10. The consensus states "Jason Patric and Ray Liotta are electrifying in this gritty, if a little too familiar, cop drama." The film also has a score of 70 out of 100 on Metacritic based on 34 reviews. Audiences polled by CinemaScore gave the film an average grade of "B−" on an A+ to F scale.

Positive reviews praised the acting and the story for putting a fresh spin on familiar cop film clichés. Some critics compared the film "to landmark ’70s police thrillers like The French Connection and Serpico—films that had style and energy to spare but were more interested in pursuing the minds of their characters than creating elaborate action sequences".

The film’s grittiness was also noted. In a three-star review, Roger Ebert wrote, "In terms of its urban wasteland, the movie descends to a new level of grittiness. These streets aren't mean, they're cruel, and to work them is like being the garbage man in hell." He added "the movie's writer and director, Joe Carnahan, brings a rough, aggressive energy to the picture".

Critics noted Jason Patric and Ray Liotta have played similar roles in cop films before, but that their performances here still managed to surprise. Chuck Rudolph of Slant Magazine wrote "Liotta is destined for to be remembered for his daunting work here—he allows Oak’s imposing nature to run far deeper than a mere façade, but it is Patric who embodies the film’s soul. Quiet, tentative, but capable of meeting Oak toe to toe, it’s a remarkable piece of acting that suggests the unknowable state of turbulence and frustration that comes with investigating violent crimes."

Criticisms mainly centered on the film’s familiar themes and plot arcs, such as "street justice" versus morality, as well as of the film’s ending, which Ebert defended as "a neat and ironic exercise in poetic justice".

=== Awards and nominations ===
Institution	Year	Category	Nominee	Result
Casting Society of America	2003	Best Casting for Feature Film, Independent	Felicia Fasano, Mary Vernieu	Nominated
Festival du Film Policier de Cognac	2002	Special Prize	Joe Carnahan	Won
Independent Spirit Awards	2003	Best Director	Joe Carnahan	Nominated
Independent Spirit Awards	2003	Best Supporting Male	Ray Liotta	Nominated
Independent Spirit Awards	2003	Best Cinematography	Alex Nepomniaschy	Nominated
Phoenix Film Critics Society	2003	Best Actor in a Supporting Role	Ray Liotta	Nominated
Sundance Film Festival	2002	Grand Jury Prize, Dramatic	Joe Carnahan	Nominated

== Cancelled TV adaptation ==
In 2014, Paramount Television announced plans to develop a television series that would be a new take on Narc, with Carnahan directing and writing the pilot episode. Eminem was reported to be in negotiations to join the series as a music supervisor and executive producer, including writing new songs, but plans on a television series did not move forward.
