= Chance of a Lifetime (1991 film) =

1991 American television film

- Genre: Romantic comedy
- Written by: Lynn Roth
- Directed by: Jonathan Sanger
- Starring: Betty White; Leslie Nielsen; Ed Begley, Jr.
- Music by: David McHugh
- Country of origin: United States
- Original language: English

Production
- Executive producers: Charles Fries; Lynn Roth
- Cinematography: Stephen McNutt
- Editor: Toni Morgan
- Running time: 93 minutes
- Production companies: Fries Entertainment; Lynn Roth Productions

Original release
- Network: NBC
- Release: November 18, 1991

Chance of a Lifetime is a 1991 American romantic comedy television film directed by Jonathan Sanger and written by Lynn Roth. It stars Betty White, Leslie Nielsen, and Ed Begley, Jr., and aired on NBC on November 18, 1991.

== Plot ==
Workaholic Cleveland business owner Evelyn Eglin receives news from her doctor that she only has six months to live. She sets off on a vacation to Mexico where she meets a man named Lloyd Dixon, and the two fall in love. The pair are both widowers and spend time "learning to live again", but Evelyn soon finds out that her original diagnosis was wrong. Faced with the fact that she has longer than six months, Evelyn has to decide whether she wants to stay in a relationship with Lloyd.

== Cast ==
- Betty White as Evelyn Eglin
- Leslie Nielsen as Lloyd Dixon
- Ed Begley Jr. as Darrel Eglin
- Michael Tucci as Randall
- William Windom as Dr. Edelman
- Ann Turkel as Tippi van Norden
- Elaine Stritch as Sybil Sedgwick
- Orson Bean as Fred Novins
- Annabelle Gurwitch as Sherry
- Lincoln Kilpatrick as Amos
- Mitzi McCall as Bea
- Susan Brown as Barbara

== Production ==
The script was written especially for Betty White. When asked by NBC if there was a project she hadn't done before that she was interested in, she requested "a love story". Filming took place while White's show The Golden Girls was on hiatus. The Mexico scenes were filmed in Oxnard, California.
