= Elizabethtown (film) =

2005 film by Cameron Crowe

- Theatrical release poster
- Directed by: Cameron Crowe
- Written by: Cameron Crowe
- Produced by: Cameron Crowe; Tom Cruise; Paula Wagner
- Starring: Orlando Bloom; Kirsten Dunst; Susan Sarandon; Alec Baldwin; Bruce McGill; Judy Greer; Jessica Biel
- Cinematography: John Toll
- Edited by: David Moritz
- Music by: Nancy Wilson
- Production companies: Paramount Pictures; Cruise/Wagner Productions; Vinyl Films
- Distributed by: Paramount Pictures
- Release dates: September 4, 2005 (VIFF); October 14, 2005 (United States)
- Running time: 124 minutes
- Country: United States
- Language: English
- Budget: $45 million
- Box office: $52.2 million

Elizabethtown is a 2005 American romantic tragicomedy film written and directed by Cameron Crowe. Its story follows a young shoe designer, Drew Baylor, who is fired from his job after costing his company an industry record of nearly one billion dollars. On the verge of suicide, Drew receives a call from his sister telling him that their father has died while visiting their former hometown of Elizabethtown, Kentucky. Deciding to postpone his suicide and bring their father's body back to Oregon, he then becomes involved in an unexpected romance with Claire Colburn, whom he meets near the start of his journey. Elizabethtown stars Orlando Bloom, Kirsten Dunst, Alec Baldwin, Susan Sarandon and Judy Greer.

The film was produced by Cruise/Wagner Productions and Vinyl Films. It premiered September 4, 2005, at the 2005 Venice Film Festival and was released worldwide on October 14, 2005, by Paramount Pictures. It grossed $52.2 million worldwide against a budget of $45 million, and received mixed reviews from critics.

== Plot ==
Drew Baylor is a shoe designer for Mercury, a global sportswear company. When his latest shoe, meant to be his great life accomplishment, is found to have a flaw, it costs the company $972 million, and Drew is shamed by his boss, Phil, before he is asked to speak to the press—his future unknown and likely finished at Mercury.

Disappointed in his failure, and the subsequent breakup with his fair-weather office girlfriend, Ellen, Drew stacks his expensive clothes and other valuables on the street for scavengers to take, then prepares to end his life. He stops at the last moment to answer a persistent phone caller, who turns out to be his sister, Heather, telling him that his father, Mitch, has died while visiting family in Elizabethtown, Kentucky. When his mother, Hollie, refuses to go because of a long-time dispute between her and the Kentucky Baylors, who are bitter about Hollie and Mitch moving to the West Coast, Drew volunteers to retrieve his father's remains and plans to go through with the suicide upon his return.

On the flight to Kentucky, Drew meets flight attendant Claire, who is managing the almost completely empty 747. To make her shift easier, she strikes up a conversation with Drew and invites him to move up to first-class seating. Depressed about his work failure, he tries to ignore the bubbly, quirky Claire who has nothing to do on the flight except talk to him incessantly about Kentucky and alludes to her boyfriend, "Ben", who is a workaholic. At the end of the trip, Claire gives him a paper with directions, helpful tips, and her phone number to help him get to his destination before they part. Drew dismisses Claire, who seems to be trying to get the last of his attentions as he seeks the airport exit.

Arriving at Elizabethtown, Drew is met by the family. He makes arrangements for cremation at his mother's request, despite the family's objections. While staying at a hotel, where a raucous bachelor party and wedding reception is being held, Drew calls his mother and sister, then his ex, Ellen, as he struggles with boredom and depression. Finally, he calls Claire, who is also alone because Ben is away working, and they talk for hours. She impulsively suggests they meet at sunrise, before she has to depart on a flight to Hawaii. They have a quiet, platonic moment, and then they part ways as she leaves for her trip.

Drew struggles between the family members and his mother's demands regarding burial arrangements. His mother is manically attempting self-improvement to compensate for the loss of her husband. Claire suddenly appears at the hotel, claiming Drew's needs for help outweigh her needs for a tropical vacation. They tour various parts of Kentucky and she helps him at the funeral home, picking out the urn and keeping Drew emotionally on track.

During a post-dinner discussion with the older family, Drew sees the stovetop flame and panics about the cremation. Rushing to the funeral home, he is too late to stop his father's cremation. Solemn, he takes the urn back to the hotel, where Claire has crashed the bachelorette party. Things lead to their physical conclusion in his hotel room, but Drew is still wrapped up in his job and self-pity and they part on strained terms.

Hollie and Heather arrive for the service, and Hollie, with newfound self-confidence, makes a breakthrough with the family with a standup comedy routine and a farewell tap dance to Mitch. Claire arrives, and tells Drew to take a final trip with his father, giving him a binder box with customized itineraries and mix CDs for the road trip. After his father's suit is buried, Drew follows Claire's map home, spreading his father's ashes at memorable destinations along the way until he reaches the "World's Second Largest Farmer's Market" in Nebraska. There, a series of notes and clues gives him a choice: to either follow the map home or to go in a new direction, searching for the "girl in the red hat". He finds Claire, they kiss, and Drew realizes he loves her.

== Cast ==
- Orlando Bloom as Drew Baylor
- Kirsten Dunst as Claire Colburn
- Susan Sarandon as Hollie Baylor
- Alec Baldwin as Phil DeVoss
- Bruce McGill as Bill Banyon
- Judy Greer as Heather Baylor
- Jessica Biel as Ellen Kishmore
- Paul Schneider as Jesse Baylor
- Loudon Wainwright III as Uncle Dale
- Gailard Sartain as Charles Dean
- Jed Rees as Chuck Hasboro
- Jim Fitzpatrick as Rusty
- Paula Deen as Aunt Dora
- Dan Biggers as Uncle Roy
- Alice Marie Crowe as Aunt Lena
- Tim Devitt as Mitch Baylor
- Ted Manson as Sad Joe
- Shane Lyons as Charlie Bill
- Emily Rutherfurd as Cindy Hasboro

== Production ==
Jane Fonda was cast in Susan Sarandon's role, but had to drop out. Ashton Kutcher, Seann William Scott, Colin Hanks, Chris Evans, and James Franco all auditioned for Orlando Bloom's part. Kutcher was actually hired to play Drew, but director Cameron Crowe decided during filming that the chemistry between him and Kirsten Dunst was not right and Kutcher left the project. Jessica Biel auditioned for the female lead, but was given a smaller role as Drew's ex-girlfriend.

Recognizable settings for scenes shot in Louisville, Kentucky, include the Brown Hotel, Highland Middle School, and Cave Hill Cemetery. Opening scene shows a helicopter flying over downtown Portland, Oregon, and the Fremont Bridge. Although the exterior, lobby, and corridors of the Brown Hotel are seen, the hotel's Crystal Ball Room was replicated on a soundstage. While Bloom's character is supposedly driving to Elizabethtown, he is traveling in the wrong direction. He is also pictured going through the Cherokee Park tunnel on I-64 although Elizabethtown is on I-65, about 40 miles (64 km) in the other direction.

Despite the film's title, most of the smalltown scenes were filmed in Versailles, Kentucky. Only two scenes portraying distinctive landmarks were filmed in Elizabethtown, because many of its historic buildings have been replaced by chain stores and urban sprawl. A few scenes were filmed in LaGrange. Other local scenes were filmed in Otter Creek Park in Meade County, near Brandenburg. Filming also took place in Scottsbluff, Nebraska; Eureka Springs, Arkansas; Memphis, Tennessee; and Oklahoma City.

In the original cut of the film shown at the Toronto International Film Festival, an epilogue reveals that the flaw in the shoe designed by Drew, that it whistles while walking, turns out to be a hit with consumers. This was cut from the release version of the film to prevent the ending from seeming overly drawn-out.

== Themes ==
Roger Ebert published a letter from reader Todd Zimmerman which makes the observation that the film is really a hidden story of an angel who has fallen from grace. Claire, the angel, is met in the heavens (the empty plane) and has decided to guide Drew through his depression and suicidal thoughts and help him redeem himself from failure. Character names, the corporation, etc. were found to be allusions to Hell, the Bible, sin and the devil. Drew has to redeem and cleanse himself from working with the devil. Claire also needs to make the choice to remain on Earth at the end. The movie is thought to take various cues from the films It's a Wonderful Life (1946), City of Angels (1998), and Dogma (1999).

== Reception ==
=== Critical response ===
On the review aggregator website Rotten Tomatoes, 27% of 175 critics' reviews are positive, with an average rating of 5/10. The website's consensus reads: "This story of a floundering shoe designer who returns home for a family tragedy gets lost in undeveloped plot lines and lackluster performances." Metacritic, which uses a weighted average, assigned the film a score of 45 out of 100, based on 37 critics, indicating "mixed or average" reviews. Audiences polled by CinemaScore gave the film an average grade of "B" on an A+ to F scale.

Film critic Roger Ebert gave the film a positive review with three stars out of four. He describes the story as the most unrelenting "Meet Cute" in movie history. He went on to say "the film is nowhere near one of Crowe's great films (like Almost Famous), but it is sweet and good-hearted and has some real laughs." Ebert later reprinted on his site an analysis of the film pointing out various plot elements supporting the idea that Claire is actually an angel.

In his review, Nathan Rabin of The A.V. Club created the term "Manic Pixie Dream Girl" to describe the "bubbly, shallow cinematic creature" stock character type that he stated Dunst plays in the film.

=== Box office ===
Elizabethtown was commercially released on October 14, 2005, in the United States. It was distributed to 2,517 theaters and grossed $4,050,915 on its opening day. At the end of its opening weekend, the film had grossed $10,618,711, making it the third-highest gross for that weekend. Overall, the film grossed $52,034,889 worldwide during its 68-day release.

== Soundtrack ==
The film features dozens of contemporary rock songs, and Kentucky natives My Morning Jacket appear as 'Ruckus', a fictional rock group who reunite during the film.

== See also ==
- Films about angels
