= Ray's Male Heterosexual Dance Hall =

1987 film

- Directed by: Bryan Gordon
- Written by: Bryan Gordon
- Produced by: Stephen Anderson; Tikki Goldberg; Jana Sue Memel; Jonathan Sanger
- Starring: John Achorn; Tim Choate
- Cinematography: Philip H. Lathrop
- Edited by: Debra Neil-Fisher
- Production company: Chanticleer Films Discovery Program
- Release date: 1987
- Running time: 23 minutes
- Country: United States
- Language: English

Ray's Male Heterosexual Dance Hall is a 1987 American short comedy film directed by Bryan Gordon. At the 60th Academy Awards, held in 1988, it won an Oscar for Best Short Subject.

== Plot ==
An unemployed man discovers that landing a top job hangs a great deal on the person you ultimately decide to boogie with at Ray's Male Heterosexual Dance Hall.

== Cast ==
- John Achorn as George Scurry
- Tim Choate as Phil Leeds
- Joe D'Angerio as John Garber
- Boyd Gaines as Sam Logan
- Darryl Henriques as Stuart Gaul
- Tommy Hinkley as Andrew Northfield
- Matt Landers as Ray Pindally
- Jay McCormack as Dick 'Tango Man' Dietz
- Sam McMurray as Peter Harriman
- Steven Memel as Disc Jockey
- David Rasche as Cal McGinnis
- Kevin Scannell as Ben Trelborne
- Ed Scheibner as Bartender
- Peter Van Norden as Ed Granger
- Lyman Ward as Dick Tratten
- Lee Wilkof as Malcolm Stennis
- Fred Willard as Tom Osborne
- Kent Williams as Steve Cook
- Robert Wuhl as Benny Berbel
