= Ebbe Roe Smith =

American actor and screenwriter (born 1949)

- Born: June 25, 1949 (age 76); San Diego, California, U.S.
- Occupations: Actor, screenwriter
- Children: 2

Ebbe Roe Smith (born June 25, 1949) is an American actor and screenwriter, who wrote the film Falling Down, and was a co-writer of the Oscar-nominated short film Partners (1993). As an actor, Smith has appeared in films and television series such as Outrageous Fortune, The Big Easy, Fatal Beauty and Murphy Brown.

== Filmography ==
Year	Title	Role	Notes
1980	Brubaker	Pavitch	
1980	Resurrection	Hank Peterson	
1982	I'm Dancing as Fast as I Can	Chet	
1982	Pandemonium	Pete	
1982	The Blue and the Gray	Bates	Miniseries
1983	Deal of the Century	Bob	
1984	AfterMASH	Fulmer	Episode: Another Saturday Night
1985	My Man Adam	Eddy	
1986	The Twilight Zone	Gary Frick	Episode: Dead Run
1986	The Big Easy	Ed Dodge	
1986	The Disney Sunday Movie	Jesse/Joe Bonner	2 episodes
1986	Amazing Stories	Theresa	Episode: Theresa
1987	Outrageous Fortune	Russian #2	
1987	Fatal Beauty	Marty	
1987	Big Bad Mama II	Lucas Stroud	
1988	Tapeheads	Mr. G.	
1989	Fletch Lives	Jim Bob	
1989	Turner & Hooch	Harley McCabe	
1989	Doogie Howser, M.D.	Suspect	Episode: Simply Irresistible
1989	Cheers	Ron	Episode: "Two Girls for Every Boyd"
1992	Roadside Prophets	Journalist	
1993	Falling Down	Guy on Freeway	Also writer and associate producer
1994	Floundering	Dougie	
1997	Mad City	Bartholomew	
2011	Leverage	Mac	Episode: The Experimental Job
2012	Grimm	Mr. Burgess	Episode: Of Mouse and Man
