= Mission: Impossible (film) =

1996 film by Brian De Palma

- Theatrical release poster
- Directed by: Brian De Palma
- Screenplay by: David Koepp; Robert Towne
- Story by: David Koepp; Steven Zaillian
- Based on: Mission: Impossible by Bruce Geller
- Produced by: Tom Cruise; Paula Wagner
- Starring: Tom Cruise; Jon Voight; Henry Czerny; Emmanuelle Béart; Jean Reno; Ving Rhames; Kristin Scott Thomas; Vanessa Redgrave
- Cinematography: Stephen H. Burum
- Edited by: Paul Hirsch
- Music by: Danny Elfman (Note: Mission: Impossible Theme composed by Lalo Schifrin)
- Production companies: Paramount Pictures; Cruise/Wagner Productions
- Distributed by: Paramount Pictures
- Release date: May 22, 1996
- Running time: 110 minutes
- Country: United States
- Language: English
- Budget: $80 million
- Box office: $457.7 million

Mission: Impossible is a 1996 American spy thriller film directed by Brian De Palma, and produced by and starring Tom Cruise from a screenplay by David Koepp and Robert Towne and story by Koepp and Steven Zaillian. Based on the 1966 television series of the same name and its 1988 sequel series, it is the first installment in the Mission: Impossible film series. It also stars Jon Voight, Henry Czerny, Emmanuelle Béart, Jean Reno, Ving Rhames, Kristin Scott Thomas and Vanessa Redgrave. In the film, Ethan Hunt (Cruise) seeks to uncover who framed him for the murders of most of his Impossible Missions Force (IMF) team.

Numerous efforts by Paramount Pictures to create a film adaptation of the television series stalled until Cruise founded Cruise/Wagner Productions in 1992 and decided on Mission: Impossible as its inaugural project. Development initially began with filmmaker Sydney Pollack, but most of the final screenplay was completed after De Palma, Zaillian, Koepp and Towne were hired; De Palma also designed most of the action sequences, while Cruise did most of his own stunts. Principal photography began in March 1995 and lasted until that August, with filming locations including London, Pinewood Studios in England, and Prague (a rarity in Hollywood at the time).

Mission: Impossible was theatrically released in the United States by Paramount Pictures on May 22, 1996. The film received mixed reviews from critics, with praise for the action sequences, De Palma's direction and Cruise's performance, but criticism for a convoluted plot. The film grossed $457.7 million worldwide, making it the third-highest-grossing film of 1996, while the dance rendition of the original theme song by Larry Mullen Jr. and Adam Clayton became a top-ten hit internationally and was nominated for the Grammy Award for Best Pop Instrumental Performance. The film's success led to a long-running film franchise, beginning with Mission: Impossible 2, released in 2000.

== Plot ==
After finishing a mission in Kyiv, IMF agent Jim Phelps and his latest team are sent to Prague to stop rogue agent Alexander Golitsyn from stealing the CIA's NOC (non-official cover) list, which reveals the identities of all their undercover agents in Europe. However, the list is stolen, and the team is killed one by one, along with Golitsyn, leaving Jim's pointman Ethan Hunt the only survivor.

During a debriefing with IMF director Eugene Kittridge in a restaurant, Ethan realizes that another IMF team was present during the mission and that the operation was a setup to lure out a mole within the IMF with the help of Golitsyn, who was posing as the rogue agent. The mole is believed to be working with an arms dealer named "Max" as part of "Job 314". Realizing that Kittridge suspects he is the mole, Ethan escapes, using a plastic explosive disguised as chewing gum.

After returning to the Prague safe house, Ethan realizes "Job 314" actually refers to Bible verse Job 3:14, with "Job" being the mole's code name. Jim's wife Claire, who faked her death during the mission, arrives and explains that before his death, Jim warned her that they were compromised, which enabled her escape. Ethan arranges a meeting with Max to warn her that her NOC list is fake and that it is equipped with a tracking device. Despite Max's initial skepticism, they escape a raid by Kittridge's team. Ethan convinces Max that he can obtain the actual NOC list for $10 million and Job's true identity.

Ethan and Claire recruit two disavowed IMF agents, high-level hacker Luther Stickell and pilot Franz Krieger. They infiltrate CIA headquarters in Langley, steal the authentic list in an elaborate heist, and escape to London. Krieger takes the magneto-optical disk containing the list which he reveals to be real, but Ethan tricks him into giving it up before giving it to Luther for safekeeping. Kittridge has Ethan's mother and uncle falsely arrested to lure Ethan out. After learning about the arrests, Ethan contacts Kittridge from a payphone, intentionally allowing the IMF to trace the call. Jim resurfaces unexpectedly, recounts surviving the shooting, and tells Ethan that Kittridge is the mole. However, Ethan has already realized that Jim is the mole after discovering that the Bible he used in Prague was taken from Chicago's Drake Hotel, where Jim was stationed on a previous assignment. Ethan also realizes Krieger is Jim’s accomplice by recognizing his knife as the same one that was used to kill Golitsyn and one of his team members in Prague. Ethan pretends to believe Jim and arranges to exchange the list with Max aboard the TGV train to Paris, secretly inviting Kittridge to the meeting.

On the train, Ethan directs Max to the list, and she sends him to the baggage car where the money and Job are located. Meanwhile, Luther blocks Max's upload of the list to her servers. Claire goes to the car to collect her share of the money from Jim, revealing that she was also working with Jim the whole time. As she approaches "Jim", Ethan removes the mask he was wearing to disguise himself as Jim. When the real Jim arrives and takes the money at gunpoint, Ethan sends a live video of the confrontation to Kittridge, exposing Jim as the mole. Claire tries reasoning with her husband, but Jim kills her and subdues Ethan. Jim climbs to the train's roof and attempts to flee with Krieger in a helicopter using a rope, but Ethan hooks it onto the train, forcing the helicopter into the Channel Tunnel. He uses another piece of explosive to destroy the chopper, killing Jim and Krieger. Kittridge takes Max into custody and recovers the NOC list from Luther. As he and Luther are reinstated in the IMF, Ethan is unsure about returning to the team. On the flight home, an attendant approaches him and covertly offers him the chance to take on a new mission as team leader.

== Cast ==
- Tom Cruise as Ethan Hunt: A young IMF agent
- Jon Voight as Jim Phelps: The leader of Ethan's IMF team and his mentor
- Emmanuelle Béart as Claire Phelps: Jim's wife and a member of his IMF team, specializing in getaway transportation
- Henry Czerny as Eugene Kittridge: The director of the IMF
- Jean Reno as Franz Krieger: A disavowed IMF agent and skilled pilot recruited by Ethan to assist him
- Ving Rhames as Luther Stickell: A disavowed IMF agent and skilled computer hacker recruited by Ethan to assist him
- Vanessa Redgrave as Max: An illegal arms dealer
- Kristin Scott Thomas as Sarah Davies: An IMF agent and undercover infiltration expert on Phelps's IMF team
- Ingeborga Dapkūnaitė as Hannah Williams: An IMF agent and surveillance expert on Phelps's IMF team
- Emilio Estevez (uncredited) as Jack Harmon: An IMF agent and security system specialist on Phelps's IMF team
- Rolf Saxon as William Donloe: A CIA analyst at Langley
- Marcel Iureș as Alexander Golitsyn: An IMF agent posing as a rogue agent to lure out a mole in Prague

Additional cast members include Karel Dobrý and Andreas Wisniewski as Max's henchmen, Annabel Mullion as an IMF agent posing as the flight attendant on Ethan's plane, Olegar Fedoro as an IMF agent during the Kyiv sequence, Dale Dye as IMF agent Frank Barnes, who assists Kittridge to track down Ethan; and Morgan Deare and Laura Brook as Donald and Margaret Hunt, Ethan's mother and uncle.

== Production ==
=== Development and writing ===
Paramount Pictures owned the rights to the Mission: Impossible television series and had tried for years to make a film version but had failed to come up with a viable film treatment. Tom Cruise had been a fan of the show since he was young and thought that it would be a good idea for a film. Cruise chose Mission: Impossible to be the inaugural project of his new production company and convinced Paramount to put up a $70 million budget. Cruise and his producing partner, Paula Wagner, worked on a story with filmmaker Sydney Pollack for a few months when Cruise hired Brian De Palma to direct. While working on Interview with the Vampire, Cruise met De Palma during a dinner with Steven Spielberg. Already impressed by his filmography, when he went back home, he re-watched all of De Palma's films and convinced himself to have De Palma hired to direct Mission: Impossible. They went through two screenplay drafts that no one liked. De Palma brought in screenwriters Steven Zaillian, David Koepp and, finally, Robert Towne.

When the film was green-lit Koepp was initially fired with Towne being the lead writer and Koepp being brought back on later. According to De Palma, the goal of the script was to "constantly surprise the audience." Reportedly, Koepp was paid $1 million to rewrite an original script by Willard Huyck and Gloria Katz. According to one project source, there were problems with dialogue and story development. However, the basic plot remained intact.

The film went into pre-production without a finished script. De Palma designed the action sequences, but neither Koepp nor Towne were satisfied with the story that would make these sequences take place. Towne ended up helping organize a beginning, middle and end to hang story details on while De Palma and Koepp collaborated on the plot. De Palma convinced Cruise to set the first act of the film in Prague, a city rarely seen in Hollywood films at the time. Reportedly, studio executives wanted to keep the film's budget in the $40–50 million range. Still, Cruise wanted a "big, showy action piece" that took the budget up to $62 million range. The scene that takes place in a glass-walled restaurant with a giant lobster tank in the middle and three huge fish tanks overhead was Cruise's idea. There were 16 tons in all of the tanks, and there was a concern that when they detonated, much glass would fly around. De Palma tried the sequence with a stuntman, but it did not look convincing, and he asked Cruise to do it, despite the possibility that the actor could have drowned. During the filming of the scene in the vault heist where Cruise is suspended by a cable, Cruise put British pound coins in his shoes as counterweights to stay level.

Principal photography took place between March and August 1995 mainly in Prague and England's Pinewood Studios, but some scenes were shot in London, Aldershot, Scotland and the United States. The film was one of the first Hollywood features to be both set and shot in contemporary Prague with extensive filming throughout a number of recognizable places including Charles Bridge, National Museum or Old Town Square.

Cruise approved the script for a showdown to take place on top of a moving train. The actor wanted to use France's high-speed train for filming, the TGV, but the rail authorities objected. Thus, De Palma visited railroads on two continents, trying to find a suitable location elsewhere. Cruise decided to dine with the TGV owners, and the following day, the crew were given permission. For the actual sequence, Cruise wanted the wind powerful enough that it could blow him off the train. Cruise had difficulty finding the right machine to create the wind velocity that would look visually accurate before remembering a simulator he used while training as a skydiver. The only machine of its kind in Europe was located and acquired. Cruise had it produce winds up to 140 miles per hour so it would distort his face. Exterior shots of the train were filmed on the Glasgow South Western Line, between New Cumnock, Dumfries and Annan. Most of the sequence, however, was filmed at Pinewood's 007 Stage against a blue screen and was later digitized by Industrial Light & Magic.

The filmmakers delivered the film on time and under budget, a rarity in Hollywood, with Cruise doing most of his own stunts. Initially, there was a sophisticated opening sequence that introduced a love triangle between Jim Phelps (Jon Voight), his wife Claire (Emmanuelle Béart) and Ethan Hunt (Cruise) that was removed on the advice of George Lucas because it took the test audience "out of the genre," according to De Palma. There were rumors that Cruise and De Palma did not get along. These rumors were fueled when De Palma excused himself at the last moment from scheduled media interviews before the film's theatrical release.

=== Music ===
The film uses Lalo Schifrin's original "Theme from Mission: Impossible". Alan Silvestri was originally hired to write the film's score, but his music was rejected and replaced with a new score by composer Danny Elfman. According to some sources, Silvestri had written and recorded some 20 minutes of music, and the decision to replace him was made by producer Tom Cruise during post-production. Elfman had only a few weeks to compose and produce the final score, which used Schifrin's "The Plot" theme in addition to his main theme, as well as new themes composed by Elfman for the characters Ethan Hunt, Claire and the IMF.

U2 bandmates Larry Mullen Jr. and Adam Clayton were fans of the TV show and knew the original theme music well, but were nervous about remaking Schifrin's theme song. Clayton put together his own version in New York City and Mullen did his in Dublin on weekends between U2 recording sessions. The two musicians were influenced by Brian Eno and the European dance club scene sound that informed the album Original Soundtracks 1 that U2 had recently recorded with Eno. They allowed Polygram to pick its favorite, and they wanted both. In a month, they had two versions of the song and five remixed by DJs. All seven tracks appeared on a limited-edition vinyl release. The song entered the top 10 of music charts around the world.

Clayton and Mullen Jr.'s rendition, as well as Schifrin's version as performed with the London Philharmonic Orchestra, were nominees for the Grammy Award for Best Pop Instrumental Performance for the 39th Grammy Awards.

== Marketing ==
Apple Inc. had a $15 million promotion linked to the film that included a game, print ads and television spot featuring scenes from the TV show turned into the feature film; dealer and in-theater promos; and a placement of Apple personal computers in the film. This was an attempt on Apple's part to improve their image after posting a $740 million loss in its fiscal second quarter.

The film's promotion in Germany was complicated by Bavarian Minister-President Edmund Stoiber's ban of Scientologists from joining the state civil service. In response to Tom Cruise's affiliation with Scientology, members of the ruling CDU/CSU spoke out against the film and its youth organization the Junge Union boycotted it. The Church of Scientology responded that it had not invested in the film and that it was part of a pattern of religious discrimination by German authorities. The boycott was also criticized by the U.S. State Department and the United Nations Human Rights Commission after fellow Scientologist John Travolta arranged a meeting with U.S. President Bill Clinton and National Security Advisor Sandy Berger. The Church later published an open letter to Chancellor Helmut Kohl in the International Herald Tribune written by Bert Fields comparing German boycotts of Scientologist celebrities such as Cruise to Nazi book burnings.

A one-issue comic book was released by Marvel Comics under their Paramount Comics imprint, and was written by Marv Wolfman with artwork by Rob Liefeld, who had been asked by Cruise to contribute the cover art. The comic was unable to use Cruise's likeness as Marvel didn't have the rights to do so. The issue had been originally recalled so artwork featuring Ethan Hunt on page 3 could be edited, presumably at Cruise's request, however unedited issues had already been distributed for sale in the United Kingdom.

== Release ==
=== Theatrical ===
Mission: Impossible was originally scheduled to be released in theaters on December 8, 1995. However, due to production setbacks, the release date was moved to May 1996, where it became a box-office hit. While Sabrina (1995) was brought to file in for the film's absence in Paramount's release schedule.

=== Home media ===
Mission: Impossible was released by Paramount Home Video on VHS and LaserDisc on November 12, 1996, and on DVD on November 17, 1998. It is also notable as being one of the last major Hollywood films to be released on Betamax. The film was released on DVD again on April 11, 2006, as a special collector's edition with a Blu-ray release followed on June 3, 2008. Special features include five featurette's about the 40-year legacy and behind-the-scenes plus photo gallery and theatrical trailers. A 4K UHD Blu-ray version released on June 26, 2018, offering upgraded picture and audio. In May 2021, a Mission: Impossible 25th-anniversary edition was released in the U.S. and UK on remastered Blu-ray Disc with all eleven previous Blu-ray special features ported over.

== Reception ==
=== Box office ===
Mission: Impossible opened on May 22, 1996, in a then-record 3,012 theaters, becoming the first film to be released to over 3,000 theaters in the United States. On its first day of release, it broke the record for a film opening on Wednesday with US$11.8 million, beating the $11.7 million set by Terminator 2: Judgment Day made in 1991. This was also the highest pre-Memorial Day Wednesday gross of any film, replacing Return of the Jedi. The film set house records in several theaters around the United States. Earning $45.4 million, Mission: Impossible smashed the short-lived record held by Twister for having the biggest May opening weekend. It achieved the fourth-highest opening weekend at the time of its release, behind Batman Returns, Jurassic Park, and Batman Forever. The film grossed $75 million in its first six days, surpassing Jurassic Park, and took in more than $56 million over the four-day Memorial Day weekend, beating out The Flintstones. The next year in 1997, The Lost World: Jurassic Park would break the records for having the largest May opening weekend, the biggest number of screenings, and the highest Memorial Day weekend gross. The film topped the box office for two weeks until it was displaced by The Rock. Cruise deferred his usual $20 million fee for a significant percentage of the box office. The film went on to make $181 million in North America and $276.7 million in the rest of the world for a worldwide total of $457.7 million, becoming the third-highest-grossing film of 1996, after Twister and Independence Day.

=== Critical response ===
On review aggregator Rotten Tomatoes, the film holds an approval rating of 65%, based on 183 reviews. The website's critics' consensus reads: "Full of special effects, Brian De Palma's update of Mission: Impossible has a lot of sweeping spectacle, but the plot is sometimes convoluted." On Metacritic, the film has a weighted average score of 59 out of 100, based on 29 critics, indicating "mixed or average reviews". Audiences polled by CinemaScore gave the film an average grade of "B+" on an A+ to F scale.

Chicago Sun-Times film critic Roger Ebert gave the film three out of four stars and wrote, "This is a movie that exists in the instant, and we must exist in the instant to enjoy it." In his review for The New York Times, Stephen Holden addressed the film's convoluted plot: "If that story doesn't make a shred of sense on any number of levels, so what? Neither did the television series, in which basic credibility didn't matter so long as its sci-fi popular mechanics kept up the suspense." Mike Clark of USA Today gave the film three out of four stars and said that it was "stylish, brisk but lacking in human dimension despite an attractive cast, the glass is either half-empty or half-full here, though the concoction goes down with ease."

However, Hal Hinson, in his review for The Washington Post, wrote, "There are empty thrills, and some suspense. But throughout the film, we keep waiting for some trace of personality, some color in the dialogue, some hipness in the staging or in the characters' attitudes. And it's not there." Time magazine's Richard Schickel wrote, "What is not present in Mission: Impossible (which, aside from the title, sound-track quotations from the theme song and self-destructing assignment tapes, has little to do with the old TV show) is a plot that logically links all these events or characters with any discernible motives beyond surviving the crisis of the moment." Writing for Entertainment Weekly, Owen Gleiberman gave the film a "B" rating and said, "The problem isn't that the plot is too complicated; it's that each detail is given the exact same nagging emphasis. Intriguing yet mechanistic, jammed with action yet as talky and dense as a physics seminar, the studiously labyrinthine Mission: Impossible grabs your attention without quite tickling your imagination."

Numerous reviewers have praised the CIA break-in and the last climactic pursuit scene, despite their mixed feelings about the rest of the film. Both scenes have frequently featured highly on fans and critics' lists of best action scenes from this series and have been referenced many times in other subsequent works.

=== Reactions from original television series cast ===
Several cast members of the original television series that ran from 1966 to 1973 reacted negatively to the film. Actor Greg Morris, who portrayed Barney Collier in the original television series, was reportedly disgusted with the film's treatment of the Jim Phelps character, and he walked out of the theater before the film ended. Peter Graves, who played Jim Phelps in the original series as well as in the late-1980s revival, also disliked how Phelps turned out in the film. Graves had been offered the chance to reprise his role from the TV series but turned it down upon learning his character would be revealed as a traitor and would be killed off at the end of the film.

Martin Landau, who portrayed Rollin Hand in the original series, expressed his own disapproval concerning the film. In an MTV interview in October 2009, Landau stated:

When they were working on an early incarnation of the first one—not the script they ultimately did—they wanted the entire team to be destroyed, done away with one at a time, and I was against that. It was basically an action-adventure movie and not Mission. Mission was a mind game. The ideal mission was getting in and getting out without anyone ever knowing we were there. So the whole texture changed. Why volunteer to essentially have our characters commit suicide? I passed on it ... The script wasn't that good either!
