= Suspect Zero =

2004 American psychological thriller film

- North American promotional poster
- Directed by: E. Elias Merhige
- Screenplay by: Zak Penn; Billy Ray
- Story by: Zak Penn
- Produced by: Gaye Hirsch; E. Elias Merhige; Paula Wagner
- Starring: Aaron Eckhart; Ben Kingsley; Carrie-Anne Moss
- Cinematography: Michael Chapman
- Edited by: John Gilroy; Robert K. Lambert
- Music by: Clint Mansell
- Production companies: Intermedia Films; Lakeshore Entertainment; C/W Productions
- Distributed by: Paramount Pictures (North America); CTFDI (International)
- Release date: August 27, 2004
- Running time: 99 minutes
- Countries: United Kingdom; Germany; United States
- Language: English
- Budget: $27 million
- Box office: $11.4 million

Suspect Zero is a 2004 psychological thriller film directed by E. Elias Merhige and starring Aaron Eckhart, Ben Kingsley, and Carrie-Anne Moss. The film was produced by Tom Cruise's co-owned company Cruise/Wagner Productions. It was a box-office bomb, failing to earn half of its estimated $27 million production costs.

The film is about the hunt for Suspect Zero, a potential serial killer who is able to kill indefinitely because he is able to remain undetectable by law enforcement agencies. It features various elements from declassified DIA Stargate remote viewing protocols. As of 2026, it is the most recent theatrical film Merhige has directed.

== Plot ==
Harold Speck was a traveling salesman, making the rounds in a small town when he encountered an old man in a diner. The man approached him with a strange, uncomfortable question, before abruptly leaving. Shortly after his visit, Harold was found dead in the front seat of his car, his eyelids cut off and a strange symbol in his grasp, a circular shape with a line drawn through it. Federal Bureau of Investigation Agent Thomas Mackelway, recently suspended for brutally beating suspected serial killer Raymond Starkey, is brought in to investigate Harold's death. He and his partner Fran Kulok soon become the recipients of a series of taunting faxes from someone claiming to be the killer, leading them to discover the existence of Suspect Zero, a mysterious criminal responsible for hundreds of unsolved deaths and leaving no physical evidence behind. With the help of a mysterious informant known only as "Mr. Blue", Mackelway and Kulok follow the clues left by Suspect Zero in order to find the truth behind Harold Speck's tragic and mysterious death.

When another body is found in the trunk of a car, the agents trace the ownership of the car to a room in a halfway house occupied by Benjamin O'Ryan. Upon further investigation, they discover that the room is decorated with obsessive-compulsive sketches of a crossed-circle symbol, a Bible with sketches of missing persons, and a book on ritual. As Mackelway begins to question the other occupants of the halfway house, one of them informs him that the symbol actually represents a zero, not a circle. The killer also sends the agents mysterious information, prompting Mackelway to focus on O'Ryan. O'Ryan claims to be an ex-member of the FBI, but the agents can't be sure if O'Ryan is the key to catching the elusive Suspect Zero, or if he is Suspect Zero himself. With the evidence they have, fiery passion for justice, as well as hope, the agents must make a calculated guess to finally bring down the elusive figure who has eluded authorities for so long.

Mackelway and Kulok drive towards a bar. They had received a call about an attempted kidnapping and were on their way to help the victim. When they arrived, they found O'Ryan standing outside, the body of a man lying near his feet. To their shock, they recognized him as Starkey, a man that had recently been released from prison. Evidence soon came to light that O'Ryan was part of Project Icarus, an experimental program aimed at developing and harnessing telepathic abilities in individuals for military purposes. O'Ryan had used these abilities to understand the actions of serial killers, leading him to hunt them down. It was then that Mackelway discovered that he too had limited access to these abilities.

Kulok and Mackelway's superiors were unconvinced by O'Ryan's claims that the man had been the victim of a serial killer rather than the perpetrator. It took Mackelway's use of his abilities to uncover the identity of Starkey's partner in crime, as well as conclusive evidence that O'Ryan was indeed innocent, for the case to be solved. Finally, there was justice for the young girl who was almost taken away, with O'Ryan's use of his special abilities providing the solution to the case.

Suspect Zero is revealed to be a man who drives cross-country in a refrigerated truck as part of an elaborate scheme to target and kidnap children. It's only when FBI agent Mackelway discovers signs of freezer burns on his victims that he knows they were being transported in the truck. Mackelway makes his way to a local carnival in pursuit of the truck driver and is surprised to find the child he had seen in his vision as being "captured" is now free. He is then suddenly approached by O'Ryan, who captures Mackelway, though spares him after witnessing his bravery. O'Ryan and Mackelway team up and eventually find out the identity of Suspect Zero and trace him back to his ranch, where they discover numerous shallow graves. In an ensuing chase, both vehicles crash off the road and Kulok manages to rescue a child, while Mackelway kills Suspect Zero. O'Ryan attempts to convince Mackelway to put an end to his suffering by killing him. When Mackelway refuses, O'Ryan pretends to attack, prompting Kulok to shoot him in order to protect her partner.

== Cast ==
- Aaron Eckhart as Thomas Mackelway
- Ben Kingsley as Benjamin O'Ryan
- Carrie-Anne Moss as Fran Kulok
- Kevin Chamberlin as Harold Speck
- Harry J. Lennix as Rich Charleton
- Keith Campbell as Raymond Starkey

== Production ==
=== Development ===
The film is based on a first draft by Zak Penn, which allegedly impressed Steven Spielberg so much in its depiction of serial killers' elongated middle fingers that he went home and checked his children's hands. After it was sold to Universal Studios for $750,000, Cruise/Wagner Productions became attached to the film, with Tom Cruise and Paula Wagner producing. However the script was put onto the back burner after a deal to make the movie in 1997 with Sylvester Stallone fell through. Cruise had intended to star in the film initially, but instead opted to star in Eyes Wide Shut. Universal then courted Ben Affleck to rewrite Penn's script, but Affleck would depart the project over creative differences in November 1999. Christian Duguay would sign on to direct the film, while Paul Schrader and Richard Friedenberg were brought in for subsequent script revisions. By August 2001, E. Elias Merhige replaced Duguay as director, with production gearing up to start in fall of that year.

In 2002, Cruise/Wagner Productions hired Bill Ray to rewrite Penn's original script. Changes included moving the action from Texas, making the lead character a burned-out, disgraced FBI agent rather than a rookie, and turning a maverick criminal profiler into a psychic with the power of remote viewing.

=== Filming ===
The film began shooting in Albuquerque, New Mexico in 2002. The state was chosen because it offered tax-free incentives and financial funding to film companies using New Mexico. The program was established to entice film makers to the state.

== Reception ==
On review aggregator Rotten Tomatoes, Suspect Zero holds an approval rating of 17% based on 127 reviews, with an average rating of 4.4/10. The site's critics consensus reads, "Other than Ben Kingsley, there's not much to like in this preposterous thriller." On Metacritic, the film has a weighted average score of 37 out of 100, based on 29 critics, indicating "generally unfavorable reviews". Audiences polled by CinemaScore gave the film an average grade of "C–" on an A+ to F scale.

Roger Ebert felt that the film was too confusing, stating "enigmatic flashes of incomprehensible action grow annoying, and a point at which we realize that there's no use paying close attention, because we won't be able to figure out the film's secrets until they're explained to us." Nick Schager from Slant Magazine wrote a particularly scathing review of the film, stating "Suspect Zero proves, uninspired imitation is the lowest form of thriller filmmaking." Carla Meyer from the San Francisco Chronicle was also critical of the film, writing, "Suspect Zero needed to be exceptional, and it isn't. It's merely adequate, with one riveting element but limited chills."

== Home media ==
Suspect Zero was released via DVD on April 12, 2005, and was re-released via DVD on August 1, 2017, by Paramount Home Entertainment
