= Cruise/Wagner Productions =

American film production company

- Industry: Film
- Founded: July 1992; 34 years ago
- Founder: Tom Cruise; Paula Wagner
- Defunct: August 2008; 18 years ago
- Fate: Partnership dissolved
- Successor: TC Productions
- Headquarters: United States
- Owner: Tom Cruise; Paula Wagner

Cruise/Wagner Productions, also abbreviated as C/W Productions, was an American independent film production company. It was founded by actor Tom Cruise and his agent Paula Wagner in July 1992. Wagner had been representing Cruise for eleven years before the formation of C/W Productions. The company has grossed more than $2.9 billion in box office proceeds since its inception.

Cruise/Wagner Productions was formed to give Cruise more creative freedom over his film projects and to give him the opportunity to produce and direct motion pictures. In October 1992, Cruise/Wagner Productions signed an exclusive three-year multi-picture financing and distribution deal with Paramount Pictures. The deal was renewed and expanded several times over the next fourteen years. In August 2006, Sumner Redstone, chairman of Viacom (parent company of Paramount Pictures) terminated that relationship citing Cruise's comments in the media about psychiatry, anti-depressants and Brooke Shields' handling of postpartum depression, and his taking up Scientology. However, the termination may have been more about money than anything else. Within a week, Daniel Snyder, owner of the Washington Redskins and two hedge funds, secured financial backing to buy the company.

In November 2006, Metro-Goldwyn-Mayer (MGM) came to Cruise/Wagner with a deal that gave them a percentage of the ownership in United Artists (UA) in an effort to revive the floundering production company. This deal fell apart when Wagner left the studio in August 2008.

== Productions ==
=== Feature films ===
Year	Title	Director	Distributor	Budget	Box office	Notes
1996	Mission: Impossible	Brian De Palma	Paramount Pictures	$80 million	$457.7 million	Installment of the Mission: Impossible franchise.
1998	Without Limits	Robert Towne	Warner Bros.	$25 million	$777,423	
2000	Mission: Impossible 2	John Woo	Paramount Pictures	$125 million	$546.4 million	Installment of the Mission: Impossible franchise.
2001	The Others	Alejandro Amenábar	Dimension Films/Miramax Films	$17 million	$209.9 million	
2001	Vanilla Sky	Cameron Crowe	Paramount Pictures	$68 million	$203.4 million	Remake of Open Your Eyes.
2002	Narc	Joe Carnahan	Paramount Pictures	$6.5 million	$12.6 million	
2002	Minority Report	Steven Spielberg	20th Century Fox	$102 million	$358.4 million	
2003	Shattered Glass	Billy Ray	Lionsgate Films	$6 million	$2.9 million	
2003	The Last Samurai	Edward Zwick	Warner Bros.	$140 million	$456.8 million	
2004	Suspect Zero	E. Elias Merhige	Paramount Pictures	$27 million	$11.4 million	
2005	War of the Worlds	Steven Spielberg	Paramount Pictures	$132 million	$603.9 million	Remake of The War of the Worlds.
2005	Elizabethtown	Cameron Crowe	Paramount Pictures	$45 million	$52 million	
2006	Ask the Dust	Robert Towne	Paramount Pictures	—N/a	$2.5 million	
2006	Mission: Impossible III	J. J. Abrams	Paramount Pictures	$150 million	$398.5 million	Installment of the Mission: Impossible franchise.
2007	Lions for Lambs	Robert Redford	Metro-Goldwyn-Mayer (United States); 20th Century Fox (International)	$35 million	$63.2 million	
2008	The Eye	David Moreau and Xavier Palud	Paramount Pictures; Lionsgate Films	$12 million	$56.7 million	Remake of The Eye.
2008	Death Race	Paul W. S. Anderson	Universal Pictures	$45–65 million	$76 million	Installment of the Death Race franchise.
2008	Valkyrie	Bryan Singer	Metro-Goldwyn-Mayer (United States); 20th Century Fox (International)	$75–90 million	$201.5 million	

==== Developed projects ====
- Criminal Conversation (1993, Iain Softley)
- Timejumpers (1997)
- Metamorphosis (1997)
- The Five Year Plan (1997, Phillip Kerr)
- Earth, Wings, and Fire (1997)
- In the Blue Light of African Dreams (1997)
- Untitled Phil Spector biopic (1997, Cameron Crowe)
- Sylvia (1997, Lawrence Kasdan)
- I Married a Witch (1998, Danny DeVito)
- Touching the Void (1998)
- The Lovers of the Arctic Circle (1998)
- The Higher Ground (1999, Jim Sheridan)
- Meet the Shaggs (1999)
- A Firing Offense (2000)
- Sunrise at Hastings (2000)
- Night Train (2000, William Friedkin)
- The War Magician (2001, Peter Weir)
- Ghost Soldiers (2002, Steven Spielberg)
- The Bridge (2002)
- Carter Beats the Devil (2002, Robert Towne)
- The Light at the End of the Chunnel (2002)
- Bondswoman's Narrative (2002)
- 17 Stone Angels (2002)
- The Devil in the White City (2003, Kathryn Bigelow)
- The Few (2003, Michael Mann)
- Untitled Peter Landesman script (2004)
- The Devil's Banker (2004)
- One Shot (2005)
- The Fall of the Warrior King (2006)
