= Mission: Impossible 2 =

2000 film by John Woo

- Theatrical release poster
- Directed by: John Woo
- Screenplay by: Robert Towne
- Story by: Ronald D. Moore; Brannon Braga
- Based on: Mission: Impossible by Bruce Geller
- Produced by: Tom Cruise; Paula Wagner
- Starring: Tom Cruise; Dougray Scott; Thandiwe Newton (Note: Credited as Thandie Newton, her former professional name); Richard Roxburgh; John Polson; Brendan Gleeson; Rade Šerbedžija; Ving Rhames
- Cinematography: Jeffrey L. Kimball
- Edited by: Christian Wagner; Steven Kemper
- Music by: Hans Zimmer (Note: Mission: Impossible Theme composed by Lalo Schifrin)
- Production companies: Paramount Pictures; Cruise/Wagner Productions
- Distributed by: Paramount Pictures
- Release date: May 24, 2000
- Running time: 123 minutes
- Country: United States
- Language: English
- Budget: $120–125 million
- Box office: $546.4 million

Mission: Impossible 2 (titled onscreen as Mission: Impossible II and abbreviated as M:i-2) is a 2000 American action spy film directed by John Woo from a screenplay by Robert Towne, and produced by and starring Tom Cruise. It is a standalone sequel to Mission: Impossible (1996) and the second installment in the Mission: Impossible film series. The film also stars Dougray Scott, Thandiwe Newton, Richard Roxburgh, John Polson, Brendan Gleeson, Rade Šerbedžija and Ving Rhames. In the film, Ethan Hunt (Cruise) teams with professional thief Nyah Nordoff-Hall (Newton) to secure a genetically modified disease, Chimera, held by rogue Impossible Missions Force (IMF) agent Sean Ambrose (Scott), who is Nordoff-Hall's former lover.

Mission: Impossible 2 was theatrically released in the United States by Paramount Pictures on May 24, 2000, and grossed over $546 million worldwide, becoming the highest-grossing film of that year. It received mixed reviews from critics, with praise for the action sequences and Woo's direction, but criticism for the characterization. A third film, Mission: Impossible III, was released in 2006.

== Plot ==
In Sydney, bio-genetics scientist Doctor Vladimir Nekhorvich sends a message to the IMF for Ethan Hunt, warning that his employer, Biocyte Pharmaceuticals, forced him to develop a biological weapon known as the Chimera virus to profit from its cure, Bellerophon. He injects himself with the virus, and departs for the CDC headquarters in Atlanta with the Bellerophon. En route, rogue IMF agent Sean Ambrose disguised as Hunt steals the Bellerophon and escapes, killing all aboard by crashing the plane into the Rockies.

In Seville, IMF director Swanbeck informs Hunt about Ambrose's actions and tasks him with recovering Chimera and Bellerophon, and has him recruit Nyah Nordoff-Hall, a professional thief and Ambrose's ex-girlfriend. Despite her initial reluctance, Ethan gets her to trace Ambrose to Sydney using an injectable tracking device. Ethan assembles his team, old friend and computer hacker Luther Stickell, and helicopter pilot Billy Baird in Sydney while Nyah pretends to rekindle her relationship with Ambrose.

Ambrose uses a video of Chimera infecting one of Nekhorvich's colleagues to blackmail Biocyte's CEO, John McCloy, into cooperation. Nyah gives Ethan the memory card containing the video, revealing that Chimera has a 20-hour dormant period; Bellerophon is only effective if used within that window. Ethan's team kidnaps McCloy and learns that Ambrose holds the last Bellerophon samples. Ethan breaks into Biocyte headquarters and destroys two samples of Chimera, but Ambrose's team ambushes him, having discovered Nyah's deception. At a stalemate, Ambrose orders Nyah to retrieve the virus' last sample, but she injects herself with it instead and begs Ethan to kill her to destroy the virus. Ethan refuses and flees the facility, promising to get her the cure.

Ambrose releases Nyah to wander the streets of Sydney, intending to start a pandemic. At Biocyte's storage facility on Bare Island, he offers to sell Bellerophon to McCloy in exchange for enough stock options to make him Biocyte's majority shareholder, enabling him and McCloy to make billions. Ethan infiltrates the base and fights Ambrose's right-hand man, Hugh Stamp; Stamp seemingly brings a subdued Ethan to Ambrose, who executes him. However, Ambrose discovers that the dead "Ethan" is a disguised Stamp and that the actual Ethan has fled with the Bellerophon samples. Enraged, Ambrose and his men chase Ethan onto the mainland; Hunt evades capture, while Luther and Billy locate Nyah, who has wandered to a cliffside to commit suicide and prevent the outbreak.

Ethan kills Ambrose in an extended fistfight on the beach and gives Bellerophon to the arriving Luther, who injects Nyah with it. In return for her cooperation, the IMF clears Nyah's criminal record, and Ethan starts a vacation with her in Sydney.

== Cast ==
- Tom Cruise as Ethan Hunt: An agent of the Impossible Missions Force (IMF).
- Dougray Scott as Sean Ambrose: A rogue IMF agent who possesses Bellerophon.
- Thandiwe Newton as Nyah Nordoff-Hall: A professional thief brought on to assist Ethan in tracing Ambrose.
- Richard Roxburgh as Hugh Stamp: Ambrose's right-hand man.
- John Polson as Billy Baird: A helicopter pilot.
- Brendan Gleeson as John C. McCloy: CEO of Biocyte in Australia.
- Rade Šerbedžija as Dr. Vladimir Nekhorvich: Creator of Chimera at Biocyte.
- Ving Rhames as Luther Stickell: A computer hacker and IMF agent.

Additionally, Anthony Hopkins appears in an uncredited cameo appearance as Mission Commander Swanbeck. Tom Cruise's cousin William Mapother and Dominic Purcell appear as, respectively, Wallis and Ulrich, two of Ambrose's henchmen.

== Production ==
=== Development ===
In the summer of 1996, it was revealed that a sequel to Mission: Impossible was in the works. William Goldman says he was the first writer on the film. "All that's left of mine is the climax... the climbing up the rocks sequence," he said. "I couldn't come up with a good villain and Bob Towne did."

According to screenwriter Robert Towne, several action sequences were already planned for the film prior to his involvement and before the story had been written.

Ronald D. Moore and Brannon Braga's draft of the script included Willy Armitage as one of the team members, though the role would have been recast with a younger actor instead of original cast member Peter Lupus.

Initially, Oliver Stone was set to direct Mission: Impossible 2 after collaborating with Tom Cruise in Born on the Fourth of July in 1989. He described it as "a vehicle to say something about the state of corporate culture and technology and global politics in the 21st century". Stone further noted that the film's commercial nature and Cruise's star power would, in a way, "[give him] some camouflage" when delving into overtly political themes. However, he had to drop out of the project following creative differences with the studio. In March 1998, John Woo had been announced to direct Mission: Impossible 2.

Cruise regretted killing off Jack Harmon in the previous film and attempted to include the character in the sequel. This idea was abandoned as Cruise and Woo couldn't come up with a plausible way for Harmon to have survived his death in the previous film. Extensive production of Eyes Wide Shut delayed Cruise's work on Mission: Impossible 2 and his ex-wife Nicole Kidman's work on Practical Magic respectively.

=== Casting ===
Following production delays with Any Given Sunday, Ving Rhames dropped out of the project to reprise his role as Luther Stickell. In August 1998, Dougray Scott was selected for the role of Sean Ambrose. Ian McKellen was offered the part of Mission Commander Swanbeck, but turned it down due to a prior theatre engagement in London. Instead, he would take on the roles of Magneto in X-Men and Gandalf in The Lord of the Rings trilogy simultaneously. Thandiwe Newton declined to portray Alex Munsay in Charlie's Angels in favor of Nyah Nordoff-Hall. Steve Zahn was initially cast as Billy Baird, but dropped out.

=== Filming ===
Principal photography began on April 19, 1999 in Sydney. Andrew Lesnie served as the initial cinematographer, but left to work on The Lord of the Rings trilogy. At Fox Studios Australia, four soundstages were used for the film's production, the largest at the time, costing $45 million. Filming also took place at Los Angeles Center Studios in Los Angeles, California.

The studio expressed concern about the safety of filming Cruise's entrance scene, in which he is free solo climbing at Dead Horse Point State Park in Moab, Utah. Cruise refused to drop the idea because he could not think of a better way to reintroduce the character. There was no safety net as he filmed the sequence, but he did have a harness and a thin wire. He tore his shoulder when performing the jump from one part of the cliff to another.

Newton discussed her unpleasant on-set experiences with Cruise during the shooting of the balcony sequence in a 2020 interview. According to Newton, Cruise was heavily stressed over the expectations of the sequel being good and was upset during the shooting of said scene because she had "the shittiest lines." The two decided to reverse roleplay each other as practice. However, it was unhelpful for her and pushed her "into a place of terror and insecurity." After the shooting was finished for the day, she contacted Jonathan Demme, telling him what happened. Looking back on that day, Newton said about Cruise, "Bless him. And I really do mean bless him because he was trying his damnedest".

Production was delayed due to problems with the screenplay and budget and Cruise had to take a break from filming to do publicity for Eyes Wide Shut. Combined with scheduling conflicts and injuries he sustained in a motorcycle accident while filming, Scott decided not to play the role of Wolverine in X-Men.

During the final fight scene between Ethan Hunt and Sean Ambrose, Cruise insisted that a real knife be used. The knife was attached to a cable and was carefully measured to stop a quarter of an inch from Cruise's eyeball, and Cruise asked Scott to put his full strength down on the knife to get a realistic look for the scene. Filming finished on December 15, 1999.

=== Post-production ===
The original cut clocked in at three-and-a-half hours. Stuart Baird made some uncredited re-edits to both Mission: Impossible 2 and Lara Croft: Tomb Raider in order for Paramount to get the job of directing Star Trek: Nemesis.

Manex, who created the bullet time effect for The Matrix, was commissioned to work on the visual effects for the film. Richard Yuricich served as the film's visual effects supervisor, while CFC-London and Cinesite created visual shots for the pic, with the latter handling the digital imaging, scanning, recording, and doing a portion of the composite work. Dan Piponi, Kim Libreri, and George Borshukov created virtual backgrounds, which took a large number of photographs of a specific location and reproduced it as a completely photorealistic render due to the high dynamic range imagery used, then placed actors or action within that virtual environment. The resulting virtual environment was then moved through 3D space and served as background plates for green screen photography of the actors.

=== Music ===
The film's original score was composed by Hans Zimmer, who had previously collaborated with director John Woo on Broken Arrow and served as music producer on Face/Off. The score also features vocals performed by Lisa Gerrard. In addition, the film includes contemporary music such as Limp Bizkit's rendition of Lalo Schifrin's Mission: Impossible theme entitled "Take a Look Around" as well as Metallica's "I Disappear".

While Ethan is rock climbing during his holiday, Zap Mama's remixed version of "Iko Iko" plays on the soundtrack.

About the score, Zimmer said: "The love theme from Mission: Impossible [II] was written about six weeks before they started shooting. I was on it that early. Then, we had a big meeting in Australia. They had the love theme, and I knew what the story was about, and I always thought it was about these two men being in love with the girl. So I said to the record company guy, 'Look, here's one thing I would love you to do, when you find bands for me, make them all female. Make them all about sirens.' Of course, what did I get? A bunch of heavy metal bands with guys. I promise you, it would have been a better movie, and it would have been a better score."

In 2024, Diego Pineda Pacheco from Collider singled out Mission: Impossible 2 as one of Zimmer's most underrated scores especially for the Injection scene: "The film's score is imbued with Spanish influences, filling the romance at the core of the narrative with passion and flair."

== Release ==
=== Marketing ===
The teaser trailer for Mission: Impossible 2 was released online and in theaters with Sleepy Hollow and The World Is Not Enough in November 1999. A new trailer then premiered on March 10, 2000.

Kodak served as a promotional partner for the film.

=== Theatrical ===
Mission: Impossible 2 was originally set for a Christmas release date of December 17, 1999, but was delayed to a Memorial Day weekend release date of May 24, 2000.

Universal Pictures made an agreement with Paramount to attach the trailer for How the Grinch Stole Christmas to Mission: Impossible 2's screenings in exchange for showing one of the studio's trailers in front of Nutty Professor II: The Klumps. Warner Bros. Pictures would also agree to play the trailer for their upcoming The Perfect Storm before the showings of Mission: Impossible 2.

=== Home media ===
Mission: Impossible 2 was released on VHS and DVD on November 7, 2000, with a rare Japanese LaserDisc release following on April 3, 2001 (released late in the format's life), with a potential North American release of this LaserDisc being cancelled in mid-2001. The DVD release features an audio commentary, behind-the-scenes footage, documentaries, Metallica's "I Disappear" music video, an MTV Movie & TV Awards parody called "Mission Improbable", an alternate title sequence, DVD-ROM, and other bonus materials.

The film debuted at the top of the DVD sales chart in its first week, beating out Titan A.E., The Patriot, U-571, and Frequency. By the end of the 2000, it had generated $86 million in home video sales revenue. It also ranked fourth among the year's top DVD rentals, behind The Sixth Sense, The Green Mile, and Gladiator, making $7.6 million.

A Blu-ray release premiered on June 3, 2008, and an Ultra HD Blu-ray version followed on June 26, 2018.

== Reception ==
=== Box office ===
On opening day, Mission: Impossible 2 made $12.5 million, making it the fourth-highest-grossing Wednesday opening, behind Men in Black, Independence Day, and Star Wars: Episode I – The Phantom Menace. Playing at 3,653 theaters, it had the largest number of screenings of any film, beating Scream 3. The film would go on to hold this record until it was surpassed by Harry Potter and the Sorcerer's Stone the following year. It grossed $57,845,297, crossing over Toy Story 2 to have the third-highest-grossing opening weekend of all time, behind The Lost World: Jurassic Park and The Phantom Menace. Moreover, the film surpassed its predecessor Mission: Impossible for not only having the highest-grossing opening weekend for a film based on a TV show, but also the largest opening weekend for any Paramount film. It also dethroned Austin Powers: The Spy Who Shagged Me for scoring the biggest opening weekend for a spy film, a position it held until Austin Powers in Goldmember in 2002. The TV show opening weekend record would last for seven years until The Simpsons Movie was released in 2007. Additionally, Mission: Impossible 2 would achieve the biggest opening weekend for a Tom Cruise film for five years until 2005 when War of the Worlds replaced it. Its opening weekend was the highest of the Mission: Impossible franchise, only surpassed by Fallout in 2018. The film generated $91.8 million in its first six days of release, making it the second-highest Memorial Day opening weekend, after The Lost World: Jurassic Park. Within eight days, it earned a total $100.1 million, not only making it the third film of 2000 to reach the $100 million mark, after Erin Brockovich and Gladiator, but the fourth-fastest film to do so as well.

When Mission: Impossible 2 first opened, the film was ranked number one at the US box office, beating Dinosaur, Shanghai Noon, Gladiator, and Road Trip. For the film's second weekend, it collected a total of $27 million, outgrossing Big Momma's House in the process. Declining by 53%, the film had the franchise's biggest second weekend drop, a record that was beaten in 2023 by Dead Reckoning Part One. It held on to the number one spot for a total of two weekends until it was overtaken by Gone in 60 Seconds. Mission: Impossible 2 was the most recent film to top the box office for multiple weekends until Hollow Man that August. During its third weekend, it went on to become the highest-grossing film of 2000 domestically, earning a total of $157.9 million and surpassing Gladiator. It would remain so until that December when it was dethroned by How the Grinch Stole Christmas. By early July, the film crossed the $200 million, becoming the year's first film to do so.

The film started its international release on June 1, 2000, and topped the Australian box office ahead of Gladiator and 28 Days with a gross of $3.7 million (A$6.4 million) in its opening 4-day weekend from 366 screens, a record for United International Pictures. It maintained number one for three weekends before being displaced by Me, Myself & Irene. It was a big success in Japan, recording the second biggest opening ever behind Star Wars: Episode I – The Phantom Menace with a gross of $13.6 million from 356 screens, grossing over $50 million in just over three weeks and $94 million in total. The film also delivered the third-highest opening in Spain with $2.9 million, after the latter film and The Sixth Sense. In the United Kingdom, Mission: Impossible 2 managed to beat out Chicken Run to top the box office, making $6.2 million (£4.1 million) in its opening weekend. During its second weekend, it fell into second place once Chicken Run reclaimed the number one spot, but still earned $3.7 million (£2.5 million) and outgrossed The Patriot and Thomas and the Magic Railroad. It recorded the biggest July opening in Germany with a four-day gross of $7.9 million. Its screen average of $8,804 was the country's highest of 2000, beating American Pie. The film also had record openings in Austria ($1.3 million) and Russia ($0.3 million). The opening in Austria surpassed the previous all-time record held by Men in Black.

At the end of its run, Mission: Impossible 2 eventually grossed $215,409,889 in the United States and Canada and $330,978,216 in other territories for a total worldwide gross of $546,388,105, making it the highest-grossing film of 2000. It also became the third-highest-grossing film of that year domestically, behind How the Grinch Stole Christmas and Cast Away. It is John Woo's highest-grossing film, surpassing Face/Off, and was the highest-grossing film in the Mission: Impossible series until the release of the fourth film, Mission: Impossible – Ghost Protocol, in 2011.

=== Critical response ===
Review aggregation website Rotten Tomatoes indicates Mission: Impossible 2 has an overall approval rating of 58% based on 208 reviews, with an average rating of 5.9/10. The site's critical consensus reads, "Your cranium may crave more substance, but your eyes will feast on the amazing action sequences." Metacritic assigned the film a weighted average score of 59 out of 100, based on 40 critics, indicating "mixed or average reviews". Audiences polled by CinemaScore gave the film an average grade of "B" on an A+ to F scale, down from the first film's "B+".

Roger Ebert of the Chicago Sun-Times awarded the film three out of four stars, stating "if the first movie was entertaining as sound, fury, and movement, this one is more evolved, more confident, more sure-footed in the way it marries minimal character development to seamless action." Shawn Levy of The Oregonian gave the film a "B+", stating that "if you've ever wished that a really good action director -- John Woo, say -- would make a James Bond film, you can stop wishing." In a two-and-a-half out of four review, Jeffrey Westhoff of Northwest Herald explained that "if the first Mission: Impossible was confusing because the plot moved too fast, this one is confusing because the plot hardly moves." Owen Gleiberman of Entertainment Weekly felt the film was a "throwaway pleasure" but also "a triumph of souped-up action." Jack Mathews of New York Daily Times noticed that "there's solid chemistry between Cruise and the stunning Newton, a superb actress previously restricted to such ethnic roles as Sally Hemings in Jefferson in Paris and the title role in Beloved." Ella Taylor of LA Weekly said that "every car chase, every plane crash, every potential drop off a cliff is a masterpiece of grace and surprise." Desson Howe of The Washington Post said that "[John] Woo [...] takes complete command of the latest technology to create brilliant action sequences."

Marc Salov of The Austin Chronicle wrote, "As pure a summer popcorn overdose as you're likely to find, M:i-2 is breezy, breathless, brainless fun, falling just short of Woo's own Face/Off, but head and shoulders above anything else out there just now." J. Hoberman of The Village Voice called the film "a vaguely absurd thriller filled with elaborately superfluous setups and shamelessly stale James Bond riffs." Steve Persall of Tampa Bay Times stated that "Woo directs Mission: Impossible 2 cautiously, as if still introducing himself to U.S. audiences despite Face/Off and Broken Arrow. Or maybe he has nothing left to say about the poetry of violence after such visual eloquence in his Chinese classics." Dennis Harvey of Variety said the film is "even more empty a luxury vehicle than its predecessor" and that it "pushes the envelope in terms of just how much flashy packaging an audience will buy when there's absolutely nada inside." Jonathan Rosenbaum of the Chicago Reader said that "no hero or villain winds up carrying any moral weight at all."

In a retrospective commentary in 2012, Brad Brevet noted the film has significant similarities in plot and themes to Alfred Hitchcock's 1946 film Notorious.

=== Accolades ===
Mission: Impossible 2 won both Best Male Performance for Tom Cruise and Best Action Sequence at the MTV Movie Awards. However, it was nominated for two Golden Raspberry Awards at the 2000 ceremony for Worst Remake or Sequel and Worst Supporting Actress for Thandiwe Newton, both of which went to Book of Shadows: Blair Witch 2 and Kelly Preston in Battlefield Earth respectively. It was also nominated for a Stinker Award at the 2000 ceremony for Worst Song (Limp Bizkit's "Take a Look Around"), losing to Baha Men's "Who Let the Dogs Out" in Rugrats in Paris. At the Online Film & Television Association Awards, the film was nominated for Best Titles Sequence, but that award ultimately went to Almost Famous.

For his work on the film, Cruise was nominated for both Choice Movie Actor and Choice Summer Movie Wipeout at the 2000 Teen Choice Awards, but simultaneously lost to Freddie Prinze Jr. in Down to You and Jim Carrey in Me, Myself & Irene. The film received four nominations at the 5th Golden Satellite Awards for Best Cinematography, Best Editing, Best Sound, and Best Visual Effects.
