= Paula Wagner =

American film producer

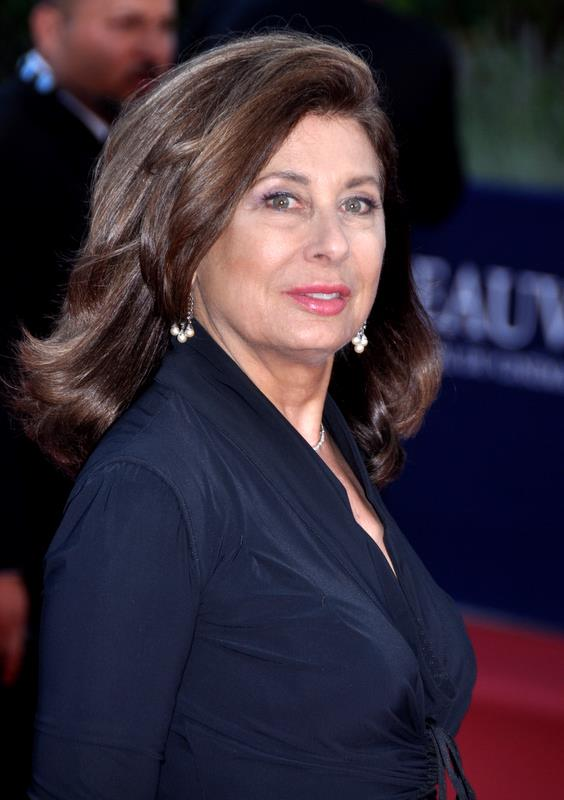
- Wagner in 2012
- Born: Paula Sue Kauffman; December 12, 1946 (age 79); Youngstown, Ohio, U.S.
- Education: Carnegie Mellon University (BFA)
- Occupation: Film producer
- Spouse(s): Robin Wagner (divorced) Rick Nicita (m. 1984)
- Children: 2

Paula Kauffman Wagner (born Paula Sue Kauffman, December 12, 1946) is an American film producer and studio executive. Her most recent credits include the film Marshall starring Chadwick Boseman, Kate Hudson, Sterling K. Brown, and Josh Gad as well as the Broadway, West End, and US Tour productions of Pretty Woman: The Musical.

== Early life ==
Wagner was born Paula Sue Kauffman in Youngstown, Ohio. Her mother, Sue Anna (née Shofstall), was a news magazine editor from Oklahoma, and her father, Edmund Jamison "Ned" Kauffman, Jr., was a business owner. While in Youngstown, Wagner frequently performed at the local playhouse. She received her BFA from Carnegie Mellon University in Pittsburgh, Pennsylvania, where she currently sits on the board of trustees.

== Career ==
=== Early career ===
In her early career in New York, Wagner played several ensemble parts in the 1971 stage production of Lenny. Some of her additional credits include the role of Helena in A Midsummer Night's Dream at Yale Repertory Theatre as well as Maggie in Cat on a Hot Tin Roof at the Cleveland Play House. Her first marriage, to set designer Robin Wagner, brought her into the industry's A-list circles; she was present when director Michael Bennett shared ideas with Robin for A Chorus Line".

=== Agent and film producer ===
After her work on the stage, Wagner became a talent agent at the boutique talent agency, Susan Smith and Associates in Los Angeles. Subsequently, Wagner was hired in the talent department at Creative Artists Agency (CAA) in Los Angeles, where she signed and represented Tom Cruise. In July 1992, after representing Cruise for eleven years, she and Cruise co-founded the independent film production company Cruise/Wagner Productions. For the next fourteen years, Wagner and Cruise produced a wide range of films that earned numerous awards and widespread critical praise, and were global box office successes. The first film released under the C/W Productions banner was the international hit Mission: Impossible, the success of which brought the company the 1997 Producers Guild of America's Nova Award for Most Promising Producers in Theatrical Motion Pictures.

In addition to the two subsequent films in the Mission: Impossible film series (Mission: Impossible 2 and Mission: Impossible III), C/W Productions went on to produce such films as The Others, The Last Samurai, Vanilla Sky, Without Limits, Shattered Glass, Narc, Elizabethtown, and Ask the Dust, as well as Steven Spielberg's War of the Worlds (which Wagner executive produced). In all, films produced by C/W Productions earned more than $2.9 billion in worldwide box office receipts.

Wagner continues to work as a film producer and studio executive, developing films, theatre, and television through her company Chestnut Ridge Productions.

Through Chestnut Ridge Productions, her most recent film was Marshall, starring Chadwick Boseman, Josh Gad, Kate Hudson, and Sterling K. Brown; a story of a true law case early in the career of Thurgood Marshall. The movie was critically acclaimed and was nominated for one Academy Award.

=== Theatre producer ===
Wagner's theatre producing credits include The Heiress, Grace, Mothers and Sons, and Pretty Woman: The Musical. Pretty Woman: The Musical, based on the 1990 film, opened on Broadway at the Nederlander Theatre in August 2018 after a pre-Broadway engagement in Chicago. The production featured a book by Garry Marshall and J. F. Lawton, direction and choreography by Jerry Mitchell, and an original score by Bryan Adams and Jim Vallance. Carnegie Mellon University later reported that the production had reached 300 performances, broken four house records, and expanded to Hamburg, the West End, and a U.S. national tour.

Wagner also produced the stage adaptation of HIGH NOON, written by Eric Roth. The project was initially announced for Broadway in 2022, with Michael Arden attached to direct. It later received its world premiere in London's West End at the Harold Pinter Theatre, where performances began on December 17, 2025, in a production directed by Thea Sharrock and starring Billy Crudup and Denise Gough.

=== Other producing ===
In addition to her work in film and theatre, Wagner also has produced for television and numerous awards ceremonies. She was an executive producer on the critically acclaimed and award winning Lifetime original movie Five, five short films directed by five female directors. She produced the Governors Awards ceremony for the Motion Picture Academy in 2013 and produced both the 2011 and 2012 Producers Guild of America Award show.

Wagner served on the board of the National Film Preservation Foundation through the Library of Congress and Carnegie Mellon University, where she received her degree and is an adjunct faculty member in the Master in Entertainment Industry Management program through the Heinz College.

Wagner is a member of the American Cinematheque's Board of Directors and the Executive Committee of the UCLA’s School of Theater, Film and Television. She is also a member of the Academy of Motion Picture Arts and Sciences (AMPAS), the Producers Guild of America (PGA), The Broadway League and is an ambassador of ReFrame for Women In Film, a formal action plan to further gender parity in the media industry.

=== Awards and accolades ===
Wagner was honored by Premiere magazine with the Women in Hollywood Icon Award in 2001. In October 2006, she received the Sherry Lansing Award from the Big Brothers and Big Sisters Organization. She was also honored by the Costume Designers Guild with its Swarovski President's Award in 2008. In 2012, she was an honoree at the Deauville Film Festival. She was one of the recipients of the Women in Film Crystal + Lucy Awards in 2016, and the Camerimage Producer with Unique Visual Sensitivity award in 2017. Her film Marshall won the Chicago “audience film festival award”.

== Personal life ==
Wagner is married to Rick Nicita, CEO of management and production company RP Media.

== Filmography ==
She was a producer in all films unless otherwise noted.

=== Film ===
Year	Film	Credit	Notes
1996	Mission: Impossible		
1998	Without Limits		
2000	Mission: Impossible 2		
2001	The Others	Executive producer	
2001	Vanilla Sky		
2002	Narc	Executive producer	
2003	Shattered Glass	Executive producer	
2003	The Last Samurai		
2004	Suspect Zero		
2005	War of the Worlds	Executive producer	
2005	Elizabethtown		
2006	Ask the Dust		
2006	Mission: Impossible III		
2008	The Eye		
2008	Death Race		
2010	Death Race 2	Executive producer	Direct-to-video
2012	Jack Reacher		
2016	Jack Reacher: Never Go Back	Executive producer	
2017	Marshall		

Miscellaneous crew

Year	Film	Role
1995	Murder in the First	Project consultant

=== Television ===
Year	Title	Credit	Notes
2011	Five	Executive producer	Television film
2022	Reacher	Executive producer	

Miscellaneous crew

Year	Title	Role
2008	Jammin'	Travel coordinator

As an actress

Year	Title	Role
1977	Space Academy	Gina Corey
1978	Loose Change	Roxanne

As writer

Year	Title
1978	Great Performances
