= Without Limits =

1998 film by Robert Towne

- Theatrical release poster
- Directed by: Robert Towne
- Written by: Robert Towne; Kenny Moore
- Produced by: Tom Cruise; Paula Wagner
- Starring: Billy Crudup; Donald Sutherland; Monica Potter
- Cinematography: Conrad L. Hall
- Edited by: Charles Ireland; Robert K. Lambert; Claire Simpson
- Music by: Randy Miller
- Production companies: Warner Bros. Cruise/Wagner Productions
- Distributed by: Warner Bros.
- Release date: September 11, 1998
- Running time: 117 minutes
- Country: United States
- Language: English
- Budget: $25 million
- Box office: $780,000

Without Limits is a 1998 American biographical sports film. It is written and directed by Robert Towne and follows the relationship between record-breaking distance runner Steve Prefontaine and his coach Bill Bowerman, who later co-founded Nike, Inc. Billy Crudup plays Prefontaine and Donald Sutherland plays Bowerman. It also stars Monica Potter, Jeremy Sisto, Judith Ivey, Matthew Lillard and William Mapother.

The film was produced by Tom Cruise (Cruise and Mapother are cousins) and Paula Wagner, and released and distributed by Warner Bros. With its very low-key promotional campaign, the $25 million film grossed only $777,000 at the box office, even though it received positive reviews from many major critics. Sutherland received a Golden Globe nomination for Best Supporting Actor for his performance in the film.

== Plot ==
The film follows the life of runner Steve Prefontaine from his youth days in Oregon to the University of Oregon, where he worked with the legendary coach Bill Bowerman, to the Olympics in Munich, and his early death at age 24 in a car crash.

== Cast ==
- Billy Crudup as Steve Prefontaine
- Donald Sutherland as Bill Bowerman
- Monica Potter as Mary Marckx
- Jeremy Sisto as Frank Shorter
- Judith Ivey as Barbara Bowerman
- Dean Norris as Bill Dellinger
- Billy Burke as Kenny Moore
- Frank Shorter as Fred Long
- Matthew Lillard as Roscoe Devine
- William Mapother as Bob Peters
- Amy Jo Johnson as Iowa's Finest
- Lisa Banes as Elfriede Prefontaine
- William Friedkin as TV Director
- Erich Anderson as Collin Pounder

== Production ==
=== Development ===
20 years prior to the film's release, Kenny Moore, a friend of late Steve Prefontaine, approached Robert Towne with the intention of making a film about Prefontaine but Towne was unavailable at the time. Three years later, the two worked together on the film Personal Best and they again explored the idea. In 1994, the two met and Moore began writing a script for Towne to direct. Mary Marckx, Prefontaine's former girlfriend and friend of Moore, gave Towne over 200 personal letters written by Prefontaine, which provided an insight into his thoughts and she also shared information on the relationship he had with his mother. Explaining how Tom Cruise got involved in the project, Moore said:

Robert and I happened to be working on a project with Tom Cruise, who is also a runner and was training for a triathlon at that time. Robert showed him seven minutes of Fire on the Track, a documentary about Steve Prefontaine. Tom immediately loved the story and wanted to see it made as a dramatic feature.

=== Casting ===
Towne originally envisioned Cruise in the role of Prefontaine, but it was decided he was too old. For the role, Billy Crudup who had been a college athlete trained for four months with Patrice Donnelly (she starred in Personal Best) to run short distances as he was expected to run 110 to 200 yards for a 5,000 meter race sequence. He also watched actual footage of Prefontaine to imitate his moves. Tommy Lee Jones, Harrison Ford and Clint Eastwood were considered for the part of Bowerman but they all turned it down and Donald Sutherland eventually landed the role. Monica Potter played the role of Prefontaine's girlfriend and spent a lot of time with Mary Marckx to prepare for the part.

=== Filming ===
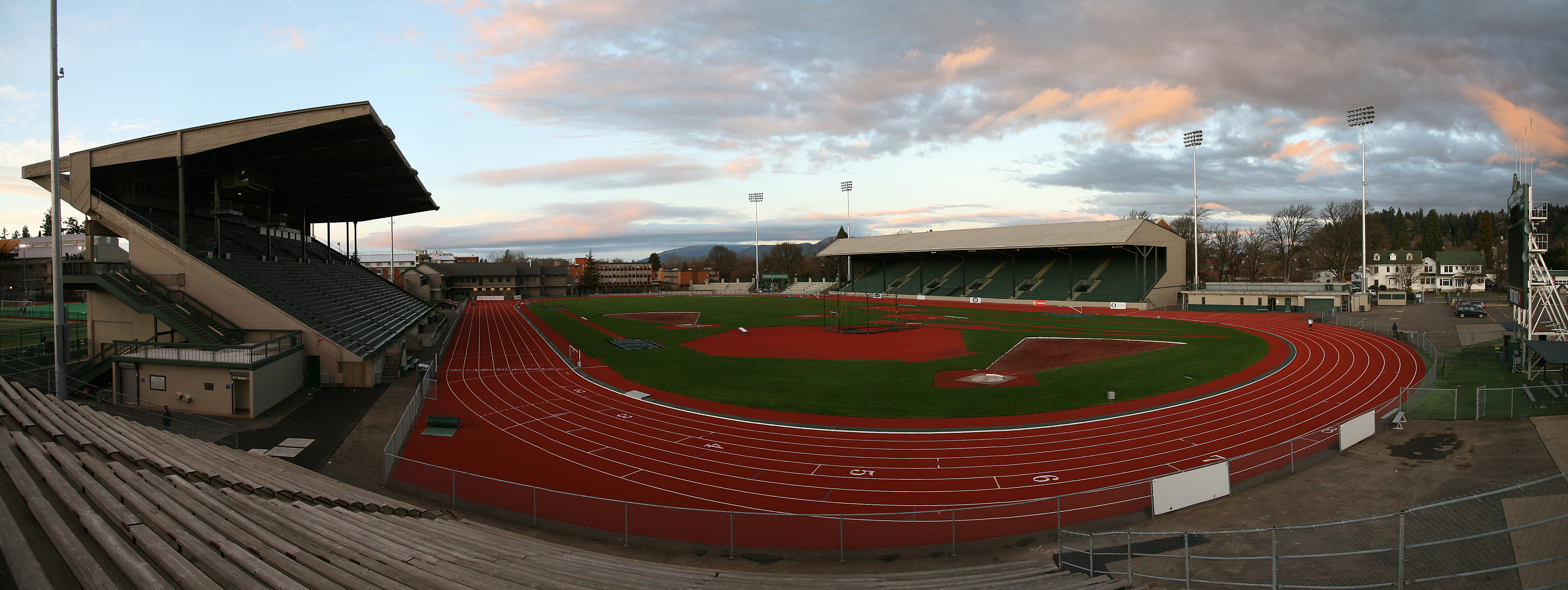
Hayward Field is the stadium used to film running sequences in Oregon

The film was shot on location in Oregon using the University of Oregon's Hayward Field. Scenes were also filmed at Heceta Beach, Oregon. Bill Bowerman's house served as a shooting location. After two months of filming in Oregon, the production moved to Los Angeles to film the Munich sequences at Citrus College. Some visuals of the Munich Olympics came from the documentary Visions of Eight:

Because Disney wouldn't let us use ABC's coverage, we were stuck for footage of the race. But then we found, in the vault at Warner Bros., outtakes from [the 1972 Olympics documentary] Visions of Eight So we were very lucky because we found perfect, unexposed 35mm film of that race that had never been put into any other film. The result is that you have full shots of Munich stadium and shots of Steve waist-high that cut to Billy and back, and you can't tell the difference.

== Reception ==
Without Limits met with positive reviews from critics. On review aggregator Rotten Tomatoes, the film holds a 79% "fresh" approval rating with an average score of 6.6/10, based on 39 reviews. The website's consensus reads: "This drama about American track star and hero Steve Prefontaine intelligently looks at the character of this oft mythologized athlete and features a fantastic performance by Donald Sutherland as Prefontaine's trainer." Metacritic, which uses a weighted average, assigned the film a score of 71 out of 100, based on 22 critics, indicating "generally favorable" reviews.

== See also ==
- Prefontaine (film)
