= Fanti =

Fanti is an Italian surname. Notable people with this name include:

- Bartolomeo Fanti (1428–1495), beatified Italian Carmelite priest
- Fausto Fanti (1978–2014), Brazilian actor, comedian and musician
- Filippo Maria Fanti (born 1995), known professionally as Irama, Italian singer-songwriter and rapper
- Franco Fanti (1924–2007), Italian Olympic cyclist
- Gabriele Fanti (born 2000), Italian footballer
- Gaetano Fanti (1687–1759), Italian fresco painter
- Guido Fanti (1925–2012), Italian politician
- Manfredo Fanti (1806–1865), Italian general
- Maria Pia Fanti (born 1957), Italian control theorist
- Nick Fanti (born 1996), American baseball player
- Ryan Fanti (born 1999), Canadian ice hockey player
- Silvio Fanti (1919–1997), Swiss psychiatrist

A variant of this name, DeFanti, is the surname of:

- Paul DeFanti, fictional recipient of the Ig Nobel Prize
- Thomas A. DeFanti (born 1948), American computer graphics researcher

== See also ==
- Afroarabiella fanti, an African moth
- Fanti language
- Fante (disambiguation)
- Fanti drongo, an African bird
- Fanti saw-wing, an African bird in the swallow family
