= Dan Fante =

American dramatist

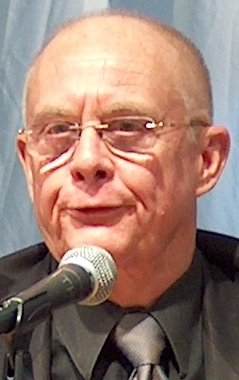
- Fante speaking at The Book Fair in Turku, Finland, 2007
- Born: Daniel Smart Fante; February 19, 1944; Los Angeles, California, U.S.
- Died: November 23, 2015 (aged 71); Los Angeles, California, U.S.
- Occupations: Author; playwright
- Parent(s): John Fante; Joyce Fante

Daniel Smart Fante (February 19, 1944 – November 23, 2015) was an American author and playwright. He was born in Los Angeles.

== Biography ==
Fante was the son of novelist John Fante whose writing came back into vogue after Charles Bukowski declared him "my God", and wrote the introduction to the reprint of Fante's seminal novel about life in Los Angeles, Ask the Dust.

Chump Change, Mooch, 86'd and Spitting Off Tall Buildings comprise a tetralogy about Fante's hard living alter-ego Bruno Dante. Chump Change found publication in France originally, before being published in the US by Sun Dog Press. All four of the books were eventually republished in America by Harper Perennial and by United Kingdom publisher Canongate. Short Dog is a collection of short stories about Fante's life as a cab driver in LA.

Besides novels and short stories, Fante also wrote plays – The Closer / The Boiler Room described by the Los Angeles Times as "ferociously profane", and Don Giovanni, about which 3:AM Magazine said: "For those who want to know what is REALLY going on in post-modern American literature right now, Don Giovanni should be essential reading". Both plays are published in book form by Long Beach publisher Burning Shore Press. He is also the author of A Gin-Pissing-Raw-Meat-Dual-Carburetor-V8-Son-Of-A-Bitch From Los Angeles, a volume of poetry on Wrecking Ball Press.

He died on November 23, 2015, in Los Angeles at the age of 71.

== Bibliography ==
- Chump Change (1998)
- Mooch (2001)
- Spitting Off Tall Buildings (2002)
- Short Dog: Cab Driver Stories from the L. A. Streets (2002)
- Gin Pissing, Raw Meat, Dual Carburettor V-8 Son-of-a-Bitch from Los Angeles (2002), poetry
- Renewal, Bottle of Smoke Press (2005), Short Story
- Don Giovanni: A Play (2006)
- Kissed by a Fat Waitress (2008), poetry
- 86'd (2009)
- John Fante & The Hollywood Ten, Bottle of Smoke Press (2010), Essay
- Fante: A Family's Legacy of Writing, Drinking and Surviving (2011)
- Point Doom (2013)
