= Black Hole of Calcutta =

Dungeon used in 1756 to hold British and Indian prisoners

Coordinates: 22.573357°N 88.347979°E

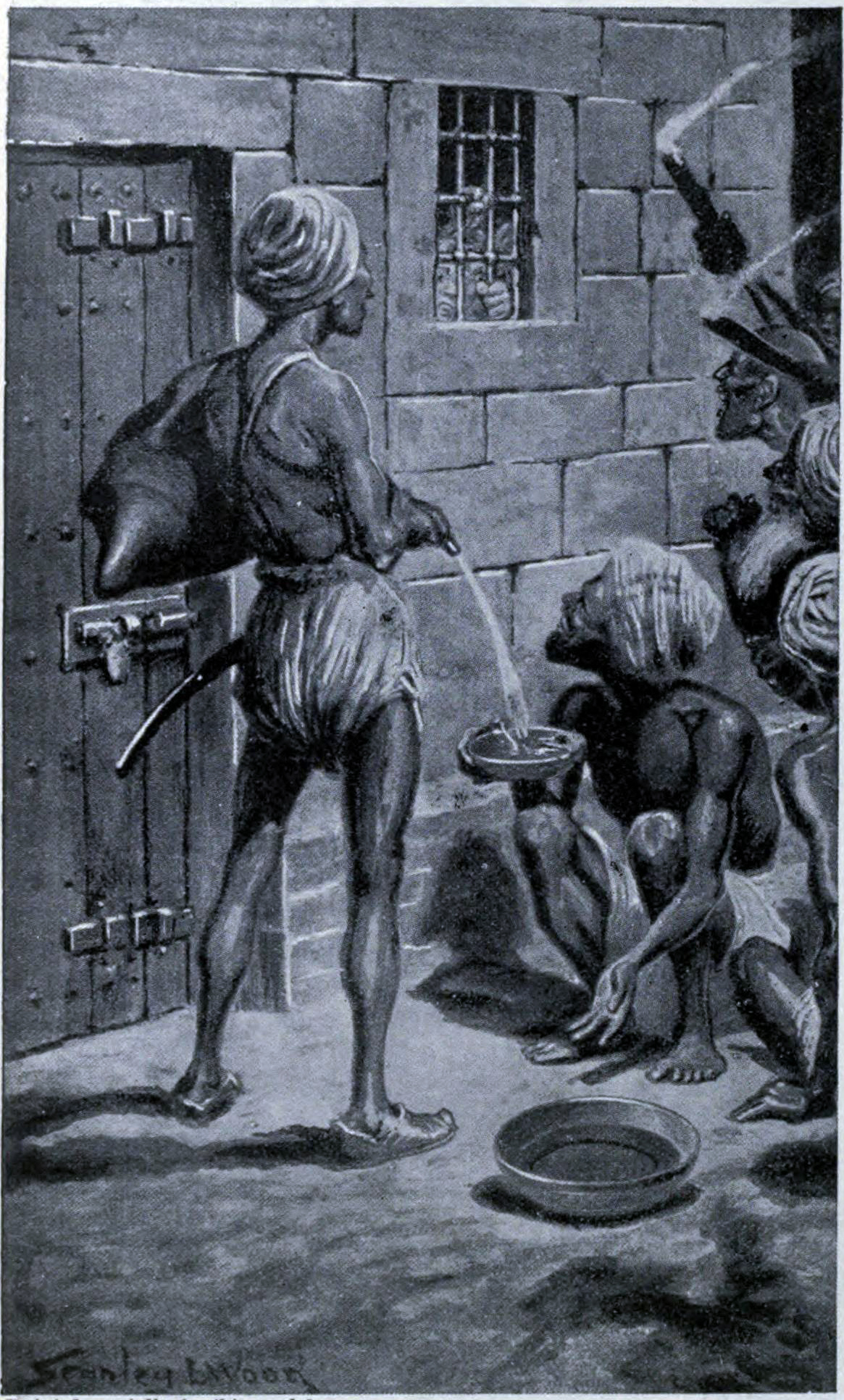
The Black Hole of Calcutta (20 June 1756) from the Hutchinson's story of the nations

The Black Hole of Calcutta was a dungeon in Fort William, Calcutta, measuring 14 by 18 feet (4.3 m × 5.5 m), in which troops of Siraj-ud-Daulah, the Nawab of Bengal, held British prisoners of war on the night of 20 June 1756. John Zephaniah Holwell, one of the British prisoners and an employee of the East India Company said that, after the fall of Fort William, the surviving British soldiers, Indian sepoys, and Indian civilians were imprisoned overnight in conditions so cramped that many people died from suffocation and heat exhaustion, and that 123 of 146 prisoners of war imprisoned there died.

== Background ==
Location of Fort William

Fort William was built to safeguard the East India Company’s trade in Calcutta, the chief city of the Bengal Presidency. In 1756, amid rising tensions with the French East India Company due to the global Seven Years’ War, the British began strengthening the fort’s defenses. Siraj ud-Daulah, the Nawab of Bengal, ordered both the British and French to cease fortification work, wary of European encroachment. The French complied, but the British continued, prompting the Nawab’s ire and contributing to the subsequent conflict.

In consequence to that British indifference to his authority, Siraj ud-Daulah organised his army and laid siege to Fort William. In an effort to survive the battle, the British commander ordered the surviving soldiers of the garrison to escape, yet left behind 146 soldiers under the civilian command of John Zephaniah Holwell, a senior bureaucrat of the East India Company who had been once a military surgeon.

The desertions of Indian sepoys made the British defence of Fort William ineffective and it fell to the siege of Bengali forces on 20 June 1756. The British officers and merchants based in Calcutta were rounded up by the forces loyal to Siraj ud-Daulah and forced into a dungeon known as the "Black Hole".

== The Holwell account ==
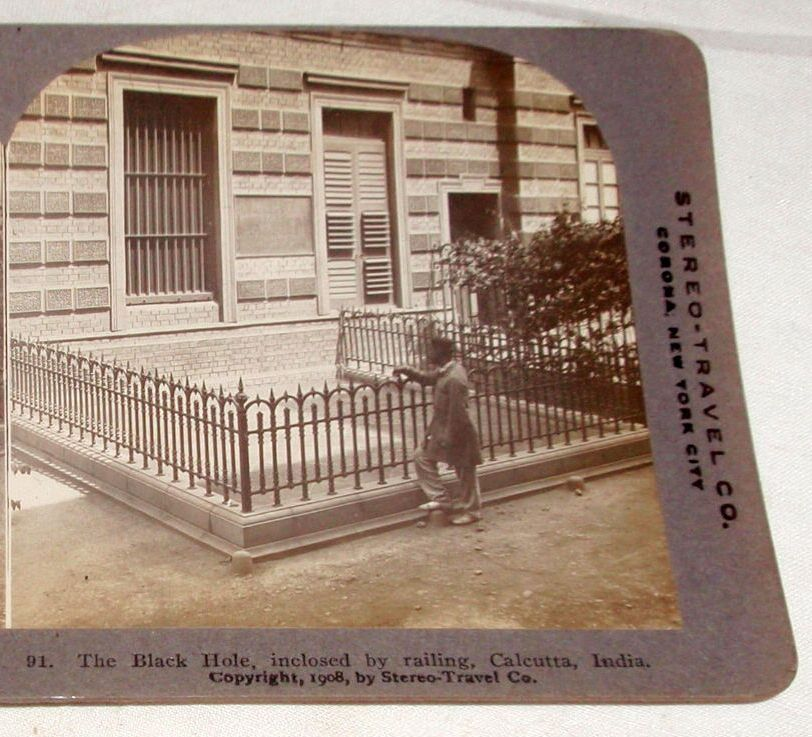
A fenced display of the Black Hole of Calcutta (1908)

Holwell wrote about the events that occurred after the fall of Fort William. He met with Siraj-ud-Daulah, who assured him: "On the word of a soldier; that no harm should come to us". After seeking a place in the fort to confine the prisoners (including Holwell), at 8.00 p.m., the jailers stripped the prisoners of their clothes and locked the prisoners in the fort's prison—"the black hole" in soldiers' slang—a small room that measured 14 by 18 feet (4.3 m × 5.5 m). The next morning, when the black hole was opened, at 6.00 a.m., only about 23 of the prisoners remained alive.

Historians offer different numbers of prisoners and casualties of war; Stanley Wolpert estimated that 64 people were imprisoned and 21 survived. D. L. Prior estimated that 43 men of the Fort-William garrison were either missing or dead, for reasons other than suffocation and shock. Busteed suggests that the many non-combatants present in the fort when it was captured make infeasible a precise number of people killed. Regarding responsibility for the maltreatment and the deaths in the Black Hole of Calcutta, Holwell said, "it was the result of revenge and resentment, in the breasts of the lower Jemadars (sergeants), to whose custody we were delivered, for the number of their order killed during the siege."

Concurring with Holwell, Wolpert said that Siraj-ud-Daulah did not order the imprisonment and was not informed of it. The physical description of the Black Hole of Calcutta corresponds with Holwell's point of view:

The dungeon was a strongly barred room and it was not intended for the confinement of more than two or three men at a time. There were only two windows, and a projecting veranda outside, and thick iron bars within impeded the ventilation, while fires, raging in different parts of the fort, suggested an atmosphere of further oppressiveness. The prisoners were packed so tightly that the door was difficult to close.

One of the soldiers stationed in the veranda was offered 1,000 rupees to have them removed to a larger room. He went away, but returned saying it was impossible. The bribe was then doubled, and he made a second attempt with a like result; the nawab was asleep, and no one dared wake him.

By nine o'clock several had died, and many more were delirious. A frantic cry for water now became the norm, and one of the guards, more compassionate than his fellows, caused some water to be brought to the bars, where Mr. Holwell and two or three others received it in their hats and passed it on to the men behind. In their impatience to secure it nearly all was spilled, and the little they drank seemed only to increase their thirst. Self-control was soon lost; those in remote parts of the room struggled to reach the window, and a fearful tumult ensued, in which the weakest were trampled or pressed to death. They raved, fought, prayed, blasphemed, and many then fell exhausted on the floor, where suffocation put an end to their torments.

About 11 o'clock the prisoners began to drop off, fast. At length, at six in the morning, Siraj-ud-Daulah awoke and ordered the door to be opened. Of the 146 only 23, including Mr. Holwell [from whose narrative, published in the Annual Register and The Gentleman's Magazine for 1758, this account is partly derived], remained alive, and they were either stupefied or raving. Fresh air soon revived them, and the commander was then taken before the nawab, who expressed no regret for what had occurred, and gave no other sign of sympathy than ordering the Englishman a chair and a glass of water. Notwithstanding this indifference, Mr. Holwell and some others acquit him of any intention of causing the catastrophe and ascribe it to the malice of certain officers, but many think this opinion unfounded.

Afterward, when the prison of Fort William was opened, the corpses of the dead men were thrown into a ditch. As prisoners of war, Holwell and three other men were transferred to Murshidabad.

== British reaction ==
The remaining survivors of the Black Hole of Calcutta were freed the next morning on the orders of the Nawab, who learned only that morning of their sufferings. After news of Calcutta's capture was received by the British in Madras in August 1756, Lieutenant Colonel Robert Clive was sent to retaliate against the Nawab. With his troops and local Indian allies, Clive recaptured Calcutta in January 1757, and defeated Siraj ud-Daulah at the Battle of Plassey, which resulted in Siraj being overthrown as Nawab of Bengal and executed.

== Monument to the victims ==
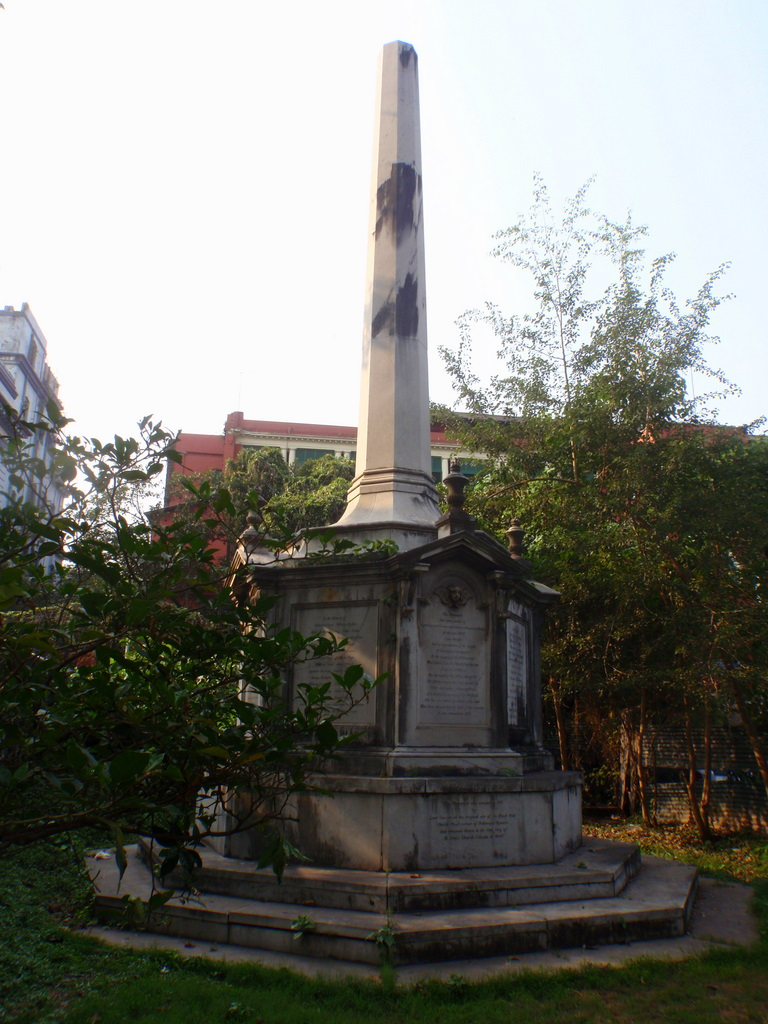
The Black Hole Memorial, St. John's Church, Calcutta, India.

In memoriam of the dead, the British erected a 15-metre (49 ft) high obelisk; it now is in the graveyard of (Anglican) St. John's Church, Calcutta. Holwell had erected a tablet on the site of the 'Black Hole' to commemorate the victims but, at some point (the precise date is uncertain), it disappeared. Lord Curzon, on becoming Viceroy in 1899, noticed that there was nothing to mark the spot and commissioned a new monument, mentioning the prior existence of Holwell's; it was erected in 1901 at the corner of Dalhousie Square (now B. B. D. Bagh), which is said to be the site of the 'Black Hole'. At the apex of the Indian independence movement, the presence of this monument in Calcutta was turned into a nationalist cause célèbre. Nationalist leaders, including Subhas Chandra Bose, lobbied energetically for its removal. The Congress and the Muslim League joined forces in the anti-monument movement. As a result, Abdul Wasek Mia of Nawabganj thana, a student leader of that time, led the removal of the monument from Dalhousie Square in July 1940. The monument was re-erected in the graveyard of St John's Church in Calcutta, where it remains.

The 'Black Hole' itself, being merely the guardroom in the old Fort William, disappeared shortly after the incident when the fort itself was taken down to be replaced by the new Fort William which still stands today in the Maidan to the south of B.B.D. Bagh. The precise location of that guardroom is in an alleyway between the General Post Office and the adjacent building to the north, in the north west corner of B.B.D. Bagh. The memorial tablet which was once on the wall of that building beside the GPO can now be found in the nearby postal museum.

"List of the smothered in the Black Hole prison exclusive of sixty-nine, consisting of Dutch and British sergeants, corporals, soldiers, topazes, militia, whites, and Portuguese, (whose names I am unacquainted with), making on the whole one hundred and twenty-three persons."

Holwell's list of the victims of the Black Hole of Calcutta:

Of Counsel – E. Eyre, Esqr., Wm. Baillie, Esqr., the Rev. Jervas Bellamy.

Gentlemen in the Service – Messrs. Jenks, Revely, Law, Coales, Valicourt, Jeb, Torriano, E. Page, S. Page, Grub, Street, Harod, P. Johnstone, Ballard, N. Drake, Carse, Knapton, Gosling, Robert Byng, Dod, Dalrymple, V. Ament Theme.

Military Captains – Clayton, Buchanan, Witherington.

Lieutenants – Bishop, Ifays, Blagg, Simson, Bellamy.

Ensigns – Paccard, Scot, Hastings, C. Wedderburn, Dumbleton.

Sergeants, &c. – Sergeant-Major Abraham, Quartermaster Cartwright, Sergeant Bleau (these were sergeants of militia).

Sea Captains – Hunt, Osburne, Purnell (survived the night; died on the morn), Messrs. Carey, Stephenson, Guy, Porter, W. Parker, Caulker, Bendall, Atkinson, Leech, &c., &c.

The list of the men who survived their imprisonment in the Black Hole of Calcutta:

Messrs. John Zephaniah Holwell, Court, Secretary Cooke, Lushington, Burdett, Ensign Walcott, Mrs. Carey, Captain Mills, Captain Dickson, Mr. Moran, John Meadows, and twelve military and militia (blacks & whites).

== In popular culture ==
Text on the Memorial in St John's Churchyard

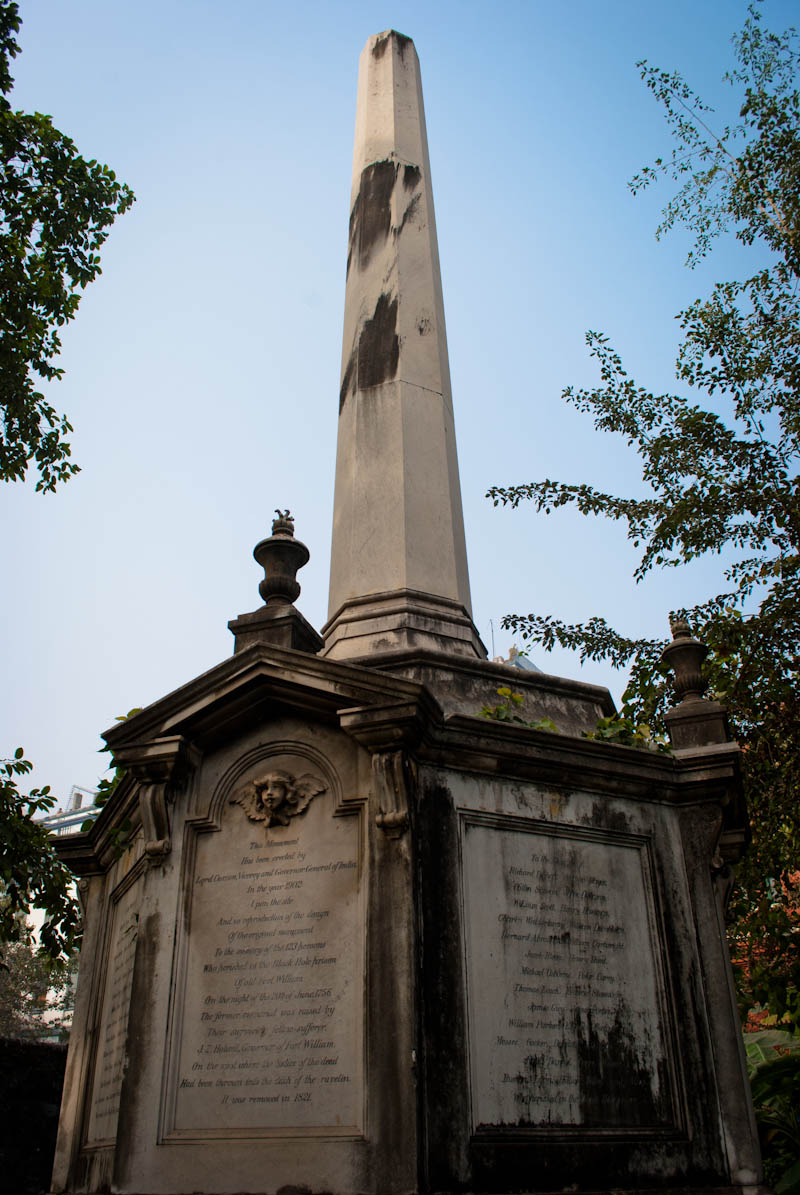
Black Hole Monument

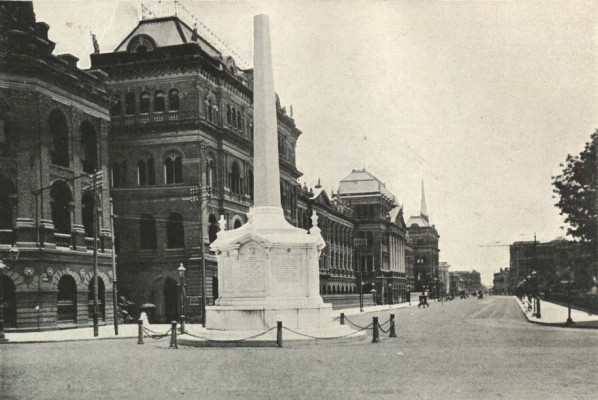
Holwell Monument, c. 1905

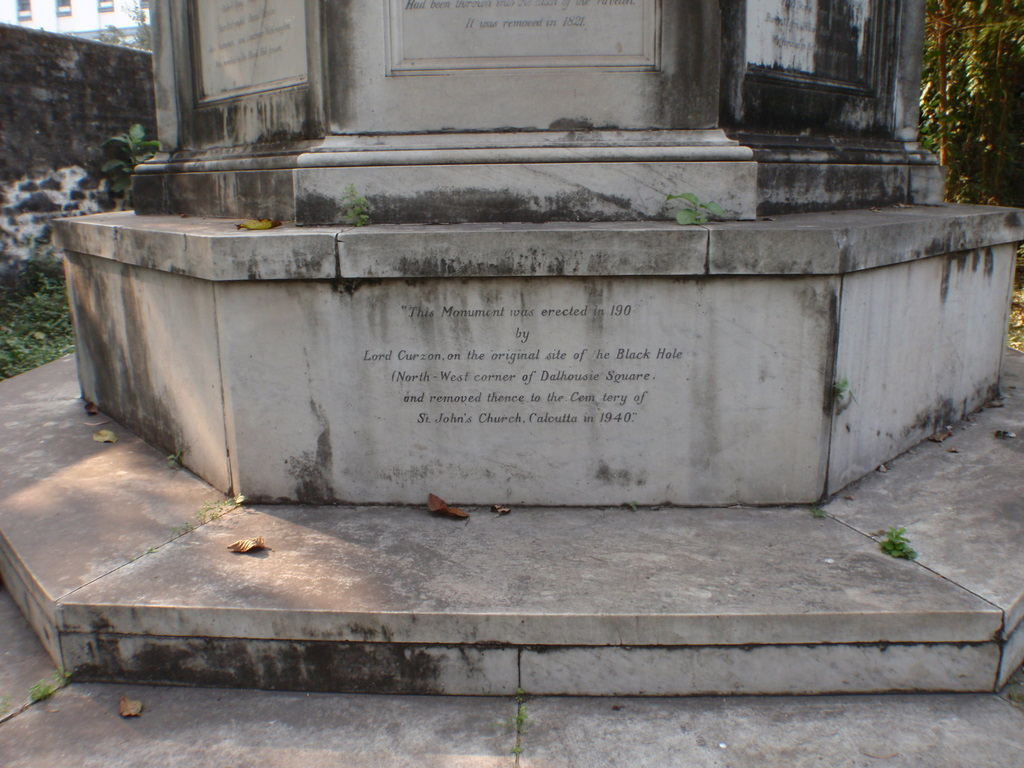
Inscription dating relocation

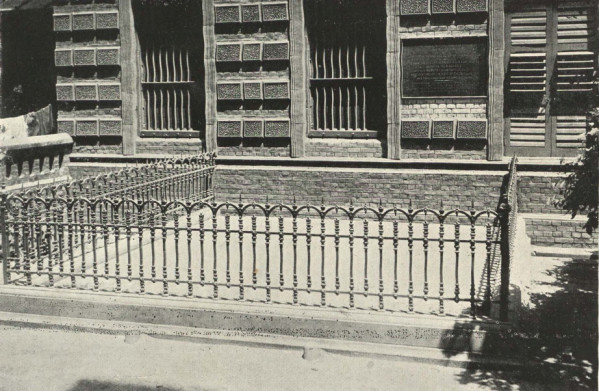
Scene of the Black Hole, c. 1905

=== Literature ===
Mark Twain, on Chapter 20 in his travelogue Innocents Abroad (1867), describes a cell he and his fellow passengers were put into by police in Bellagio, Italy, as "the Black Hole of Calcutta on a small scale." Later, in chapter 54 of his Following the Equator (1897), he visits Calcutta and describes the history of the place, quoting an excerpt from Holwell. He also mentions the destruction of the site: "the mention of Calcutta infallibly brings up the Black Hole...and yet within the time of men who still live, the Black Hole was torn down and thrown away as carelessly as if its bricks were common clay, not ingots of historic gold. There is no accounting for human beings."

Muriel Rukeyser, in The Book of the Dead, originally published as a group of poems in U.S. 1: Poems (1938), quotes from Vito Marcantonio's speech "Dusty Death" (1936). Rukeyser was writing about the Hawk's Nest Tunnel tragedy and referenced to Marcantonio's speech to compare the silicate tunnels to the Black Holes of Calcutta, writing "This is the place. Away from this my life I am indeed Adam unparadiz'd. Some fools call this the Black Hole of Calcutta. I don't know how they ever get to Congress."

Thomas Pynchon refers to the Black Hole of Calcutta in the historical novel Mason & Dixon (1997). The character Charles Mason spends much time on Saint Helena with the astronomer Nevil Maskelyne, the brother-in-law of Lord Robert Clive of India. Later in the story, Jeremiah Dixon visits New York City, and attends a secret "Broad-Way" production of the "musical drama", The Black Hole of Calcutta, or, the Peevish Wazir, "executed with such a fine respect for detail ...". Kenneth Tynan satirically refers to it in the long-running musical revue Oh! Calcutta!, which was played on Broadway for more than 7,000 performances. Edgar Allan Poe makes reference to the "stifling" of the prisoners in the introduction to "The Premature Burial" (1844). The Black Hole is mentioned in Looking Backward (1888) by Edward Bellamy as an example of the depravity of the past.

In a story written by Indian author Masti Venkatesha Iyengar, "Rangana Maduve" ("Ranga's Marriage"), the narrator Shyama describes Ranga's house as 'the Black Hole of Calcutta' because of the large crowd that had gathered to see Ranga when he came home after completing his studies. If all the people had gone inside, the house would have become as crowded as the Black Hole of Calcutta.

In the science-fiction novel Omega: The Last Days of the World (1894), by Camille Flammarion, the Black Hole of Calcutta is mentioned for the suffocating properties of Carbonic-Oxide (Carbon Monoxide) upon the British soldiers imprisoned in that dungeon. Eugene O'Neill, in Long Day's Journey into Night, Act 4, Jamie says, "Can't expect us to live in the Black Hole of Calcutta." Patrick O'Brian in The Mauritius Command (1977) compared Jack Aubrey's house to the black hole of Calcutta "except that whereas the Hole was hot, dry, and airless", Aubrey's cottage "let in draughts from all sides".

In Chapter VII of Pearl S. Buck's biography of her father, Fighting Angel (1936), she compares the brutality of China's 1899-1901 Boxer Rebellion (which she and her family survived while living in China) to that of the Black Hole of Calcutta: "The story of the Boxer Rebellion ... remains, like the tale of the Black Hole of Calcutta, one of the festering spots of history. If the number of people actually dead was small, as such numbers go in these days of wholesale death by accidents and wars, it was the manner of death ... that makes the heart shudder and condemn even while the mind can reason and weigh."

Diana Gabaldon mentions briefly the incident in her novel Lord John and the Private Matter (2003). The Black Hole is also compared with the evil miasma of Calcutta as a whole in Dan Simmons's novel The Song of Kali. Stephen King makes a reference to the Black Hole of Calcutta in his 1983 novel Christine, and his 2004 novel Song of Susannah.

In Chapter V of King Solomon's Mines by H. Rider Haggard (1885) the Black Hole of Calcutta is mentioned: "This gave us some slight shelter from the burning rays of the sun, but the atmosphere in that amateur grave can be better imagined than described. The Black Hole of Calcutta must have been a fool to it". In John Fante's novel The Road to Los Angeles (1985), the main character Arturo Bandini recalls when seeing his place of work: "I thought about the Black Hole of Calcutta." In Vanity Fair, William Makepeace Thackeray makes a reference to the Black Hole of Calcutta when describing the Anglo-Indian district in London (Chapter LX). Swami Vivekananda makes a mention of the Black Hole of Calcutta in connection with describing Holwell's journey to Murshidabad.

When discussing deep unconsciousness in her book How to be Human, Ruby Wax describes this as: "It's like the black hole of Calcutta of our souls."

In Hellblazer: Event Horizon, John Constantine says that a mad Brahmin in the Black Hole made a stone because he wanted revenge. The stone causes one to have insane thoughts and hallucinations.

In The Other Side of Morning by Stephen Goss (2022), the events of the Black Hole of Calcutta are described from the perspective of John Holwell. The book is the story of Holwell's life leading up to the incident.

The Black Hole of Calcutta is also mentioned in Chapter IV of Sara Jane Lippincott's book titled "History of my Pets," in reference to a pet toad (named Phibby) she had left locked in the cabin of a wooden ship. The poor toad was later found suffocated as a result. Upon telling her sympathetic father, he compared the unfortunate blunder to the Black Hole of Calcutta.

=== Astronomy ===
According to Hong-Yee Chiu, an astrophysicist at NASA, the Black Hole of Calcutta was the inspiration for the term black hole, referring to objects resulting from the gravitational collapse of very heavy stars. He recalled hearing the physicist Robert Dicke in the early 1960s compare such gravitationally collapsed objects to the prison.

=== Prison reform ===
A minority opinion in the August 1910 report of the Penitentiary Investigating Committee of the State of Texas (USA) referred to the prison conditions in this way:

I trust that this report will sufficiently arouse the people of Texas to the atrocities daily heaped upon this mass of thirty-six hundred breathing, human souls, wards of the State, to such an extent that the people will rise up and demand a Called Session of the Legislature of this State in order that legislation may be enacted whereby this organized hell and "Black Hole of Calcutta" will be in the course of a few months only a ghastly memory in the minds of the people.

— C. B. Hudspeth, Report of the Penitentiary Investigating Committee (1910)

== See also ==
- Human rights violation
- Hỏa Lò Prison
