= Fante =

Fante may refer to:

- Fante people, an Akan people from central southern coast of West Africa
- Fante dialect, a Niger-Congo language
- Fante Confederacy, either the loose alliance of the Fante states in existence at least since the sixteenth century, or the Confederation formed in 1868 and dissolved in 1874
- John Fante (1909–1983), American writer
- Fante (playing card), the Jack in Italian playing cards
- Fante-class destroyer, a class of destroyers of the Italian Navy in the 1970s

== See also ==
- Fanti, a surname
- Fanter (disambiguation)
