= Fanter =

Fanter may refer to:

- Fanter, a term used to describe Indigenous Norwegian Travellers
- Michael Fanter, an impersonator of Pau Gasol seen in the TV show Sports Show with Norm Macdonald
- Savannah Fanter, an additional musician who worked on the album Perilous
- Roger E. Fanter, an actor who appeared in a short film from the concert event Angels & Airwaves Presents Love Live
- Fanter Film Festival, an annual film festival in Cáceres, Spain
- Andreas Fanter, a member of the band Milhaven

== See also ==
- Fanta (disambiguation)
- Fante (disambiguation)
- Fantera language
