= Robert Towne =

American screenwriter, producer, director and actor (1934–2024)

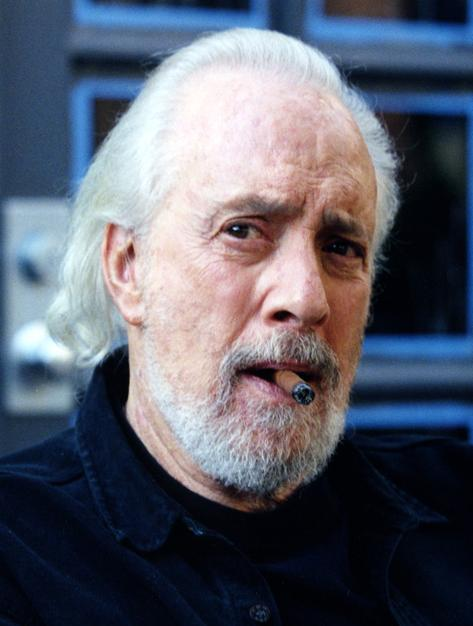
- Towne in 2006
- Born: Robert Bertram Schwartz; November 23, 1934; Los Angeles, California, U.S.
- Died: July 1, 2024 (aged 89); Los Angeles, California, U.S.
- Education: Pomona College
- Occupations: Screenwriter; director; producer; actor
- Years active: 1960–2017
- Spouses: Julie Payne (m. 1977; div. 1982) Luisa Gaule (m. 1984)
- Children: 2
- Relatives: Jocelyn Towne (niece)

Robert Towne (born Robert Bertram Schwartz; November 23, 1934 – July 1, 2024) was an American screenwriter and director. He started writing films for Roger Corman, including The Tomb of Ligeia in 1964, and was later part of the New Hollywood wave of filmmaking.

Towne wrote and won an Academy Award for Roman Polanski's Chinatown (1974); starring Jack Nicholson, widely considered one of the greatest screenplays ever written, as well as its sequel, The Two Jakes (1990). For Hal Ashby, he penned the comedy-dramas The Last Detail (1973) and Shampoo (1975). He collaborated with Tom Cruise on the films Days of Thunder (1990), The Firm (1993), and the first two installments of the Mission: Impossible franchise (1996, 2000).

Towne directed the sports dramas Personal Best (1982) and Without Limits (1998), the crime thriller Tequila Sunrise (1988), and the romantic drama Ask the Dust (2006).

== Early life ==
Towne was born Robert Bertram Schwartz in Los Angeles, California, the son of Helen and Lou Schwartz, a clothing store owner and property developer who changed the family's name from "Schwartz" to "Towne." Towne grew up in San Pedro and Rolling Hills and attended Chadwick School. His family was Jewish, and had emigrated from Romania on his father's side and Russia on his mother's. He had a younger brother, Roger, who co-wrote the 1984 film The Natural, starring Robert Redford.

He graduated from Pomona College in Claremont, California, studying philosophy and literature. After college, Towne served in the U.S. Army before doing odd jobs including working as a tuna fisherman.

== Career ==
=== Roger Corman ===
Towne originally sought work as a writer and actor. He took an acting class with Roger Corman taught by Jeff Corey where his classmates also included Jack Nicholson (with whom he shared an apartment), Irvin Kershner, and Sally Kellerman.

Corman was known for giving work to untested people of talent. Towne wrote the screenplay for the Corman-financed Last Woman on Earth (1960), in which Towne also played one of the lead roles.

The following year he also starred in the Corman-financed Creature from the Haunted Sea (1961).

=== Television ===
Towne started writing for television on such programs as The Lloyd Bridges Show, Breaking Point, The Outer Limits, and The Man from U.N.C.L.E..

He also wrote a screenplay for the Corman-directed The Tomb of Ligeia (1965). In 1981 Towne said "I worked harder on... [that] screenplay for him than on anything I think I have ever done."

Towne went back to working in television when Corman hired him to write a script for a Western, which became A Time for Killing (1967). Corman left the project during filming and Towne took his name off the credits. Towne said later he "hated" the film.

=== Script doctor ===
Towne's script for A Time for Killing had been read and admired by Warren Beatty, who asked Towne to help out on the script for Bonnie and Clyde (1967). Towne later claimed his main contributions were removing the ménage à trois relationship between Bonnie, Clyde, and C.W., making some structural changes. Towne was on set during filming and continued to work during post-production. The film was a huge success and although Towne's contribution was credited only as a "special consultant", he began to earn a reputation in Hollywood as a top script doctor.

Towne was credited on Villa Rides (1968), which he later said he did as a favor for Robert Evans, head of Paramount. He hated the experience.

Towne did uncredited work on the scripts for Drive, He Said (1971), directed by Jack Nicholson; Cisco Pike (1971), which Towne said turned into "a pretty good movie" but where he got "so angry with the director" he took his name off; and The New Centurions (1972), where he was to share credit with Stirling Silliphant but asked for his name to be taken off after he saw the film.

He did uncredited work for Francis Ford Coppola during the making of The Godfather (1972), including the final scene between Michael and Vito in a garden, shortly before Vito dies. Coppola later thanked Towne for writing this pivotal and "very beautiful" scene in his Academy Award speech for Best Screenplay.

Towne also did some work on The Parallax View (1974) at the behest of star Warren Beatty.

=== The Last Detail, Chinatown, and Shampoo ===
Towne received acclaim and was nominated in the Best Original and Adapted Screenplay categories for his scripts The Last Detail (1973), Chinatown (1974), and Shampoo (1975). He won for Chinatown. He later said it was inspired by a chapter in Carey McWilliams's Southern California Country: An Island on the Land (1946) and a West magazine article on Raymond Chandler's Los Angeles.

According to Sam Wasson's The Big Goodbye: Chinatown and the Last Years of Hollywood, Towne "secretly employed an old college friend named Edward Taylor as his uncredited writing partner for more than 40 years." (Taylor died in 2013).

Towne was credited for his work on The Yakuza (1975) and did script doctoring on The Missouri Breaks (1976), Orca (1977) and Heaven Can Wait (1978).

=== Director ===
Towne turned to directing with Personal Best (1982). He also wrote the script for Greystoke: The Legend of Tarzan, Lord of the Apes, hoping to direct, but Personal Best was a financial failure, and he had to sell the Greystoke script. He grew dissatisfied with the production and credited his dog, P. H. Vazak, with the script. Vazak became the first dog nominated for an Academy Award for screenwriting.

Towne did uncredited work on Deal of the Century (1983), 8 Million Ways to Die (1986), Tough Guys Don't Dance (1987) and Frantic (1988).

His second feature film as director was Tequila Sunrise (1988), which he wrote back in the early 1980s. Towne told The New York Times that Tequila Sunrise is "a movie about the use and abuse of friendship."

=== The Two Jakes ===
Towne expressed his disappointment in The Two Jakes in many interviews. He told writer Alex Simon, "In the interest of maintaining my friendships with Jack Nicholson and Robert Evans, I’d rather not go into it, but let’s just say The Two Jakes wasn’t a pleasant experience for any of us. But, we’re all still friends, and that’s what matters most."

In a November 5, 2007, interview with MTV, Jack Nicholson claimed that Towne had written the part of Gittes specifically for him and had conceived Chinatown as a trilogy, with the third film set in 1968 and dealing in some way with Howard Hughes. Towne said he did not know how the rumour started and denied any planned trilogy.

=== Tom Cruise ===
Towne wrote the script for Days of Thunder (1990) and formed a close friendship with its star Tom Cruise.

He was one of the writers on Cruise's The Firm (1993), then Beatty's Love Affair (1994). Cruise brought him on to Mission: Impossible (1996) and co-produced Towne's third film as director, Without Limits (1998). He also co-wrote Mission Impossible II (2000) for Cruise.

=== Later career ===
A project Towne had long sought to bring to the screen came to fruition in 2006 with Ask the Dust, a romantic period piece set in Los Angeles based on the novel by John Fante and starring Colin Farrell and Salma Hayek. Towne had found the novel decades earlier during his research for Chinatown, as he was looking for authentic descriptions of 1930s Los Angeles. He enjoyed the book, considering it "the best book about Los Angeles ever written", and arranged a meeting with Fante, himself a screenwriter. As a result of that meeting, Towne was granted the screen rights to the novel. The rights eventually lapsed, and the new owner was Mel Brooks. In 1993, Towne wrote the script for free in exchange for the chance to direct the film. Tom Cruise (with Paula Wagner and Cruise/Wagner Productions) served as one of the film's producers. Ask the Dust received mixed reviews and failed at the box office. The film was entered into the 28th Moscow International Film Festival.

Towne framed several of his signature films as elaborate melodramas. He told The New York Times "I think melodrama is always a splendid occasion to entertain an audience and say things you want to say without rubbing their noses in it. With melodrama, as in dreams, you're always flirting with the disparity between appearance and reality, which is a great deal of fun. And that's also not unrelated to my perception of my life working in Hollywood, where you're always wondering, 'What does that guy really mean?'"

In 2006, Towne was the subject of artist Sarah Morris's film, Robert Towne. Morris describes him as an “elliptical figure” whose career exemplifies a certain characteristic mode of working in the film industry, marked by collaboration, shared or changing roles. Morris's 19,744-square-foot (1,834.3 m^{2}) painting installation in the entryway to the Lever House in Manhattan, commissioned by the Public Art Fund, was also titled "Robert Towne".

=== Return to television ===
In the 2010s, Towne returned to television, working as a consulting producer on Mad Men.

In 2019, Towne began co-writing, with David Fincher, a Netflix prequel miniseries based on Chinatown character J. J. Gittes, with Fincher serving as showrunner. By June 2024, a week before his death, Towne confirmed that the script for each episode had been completed.

== Personal life ==
In 1968, Towne met actress Julie Payne; they were married from 1977 to 1982. According to Sam Wasson's The Big Goodbye: Chinatown and the Last Years of Hollywood, Towne was addicted to cocaine during this period and was occasionally violent, which led to a bitter divorce and custody battle over their daughter Katharine (born 1978).

In 1984, Towne married Luisa Gaule. They had one daughter, Chiara.

He was the former son-in-law of late actor John Payne and actress Anne Shirley. Through his daughter Katharine, he was former father-in-law of actor Charlie Hunnam.

Towne died at his home in Los Angeles on July 1, 2024, at the age of 89.

== Filmography ==
=== Film ===
Writer

Year	Title	Director	Writer	Notes
1960	Last Woman on Earth	No	Yes	
1964	The Tomb of Ligeia	No	Yes	
1968	Villa Rides	No	Yes	Co-written with Sam Peckinpah
1973	The Last Detail	No	Yes	
1974	Chinatown	No	Yes	Co-written with Roman Polanski
1974	The Yakuza	No	Yes	Co-written with Paul Schrader
1975	Shampoo	No	Yes	Co-written with Warren Beatty
1982	Personal Best	Yes	Yes	Also producer
1984	Greystoke: The Legend of Tarzan, Lord of the Apes	No	Yes	Credited as P. H. Vazak; co-written with Michael Austin
1988	Tequila Sunrise	Yes	Yes	
1990	The Two Jakes	No	Yes	
1990	Days of Thunder	No	Yes	Co-story with Tom Cruise
1993	The Firm	No	Yes	Co-written with David Rabe and David Rayfiel
1994	Love Affair	No	Yes	Co-written with Warren Beatty
1996	Mission: Impossible	No	Yes	Co-written with David Koepp
1998	Without Limits	Yes	Yes	Co-written with Kenny Moore
2000	Mission: Impossible 2	No	Yes	story by Ronald D. Moore and Brannon Braga
2006	Ask the Dust	Yes	Yes	

Uncredited writer

- A Time for Killing (1967)
- Drive, He Said (1971)
- Cisco Pike (1971)
- The New Centurions (1972)
- The Godfather (1972)
- The Parallax View (1974)
- The Missouri Breaks (1976)
- Marathon Man (1976)
- Orca (1977)
- Heaven Can Wait (1978)
- Reds (1981) (Consultant)
- Deal of the Century (1983)
- Swing Shift (1984)
- 8 Million Ways to Die (1986)
- Tough Guys Don't Dance (1987)
- Frantic (1988)
- Crimson Tide (1995)
- Armageddon (1998)
- Mission: Impossible III (2006)

Actor

Year	Title	Role	Notes
1960	Last Woman on Earth	Martin Joyce	Credited as Edward Wain
1961	Creature from the Haunted Sea	Sparks Moran/Agent XK150/Narrator	Credited as Edward Wain
1971	The Zodiac Killer	Man in Bar #3	Credited as Robert Tubin
1971	Drive, He Said	Richard	
1975	Shampoo	Party Guest	Uncredited
1987	The Pick-up Artist	Stan	
2004	Suspect Zero	Professor Dates	Uncredited

Other roles

Year	Title	Role
1963	The Young Racers	Assistant director
1967	Bonnie and Clyde	Special writing consultant
1987	The Bedroom Window	Executive producer

=== Television ===
Writer

Year	Title	Episode(s)
1963	The Lloyd Bridges Show	"My Daddy Can Lick Your Daddy"
1963	The Lloyd Bridges Show	"A Personal Matter"
1963	The Lloyd Bridges Show	"The Last Lion"
1963	The Lloyd Bridges Show	"The Epidemic"
1964	Breaking Point	"So Many Pretty Girls, So Little Time"
1964	The Outer Limits	"The Chameleon"
1964	The Man from U.N.C.L.E.	"The Dove Affair"
2013-2017	Welcome to the Basement	"Tough Guys Don't Dance"
2013-2017	Welcome to the Basement	"Shampoo"

=== Unmade projects ===
Year	Title	Description	Ref.
1962	I Flew a Spy Plane Over Russia	Script for Roger Corman	
1975	The Brotherhood of the Grape	Script for Francis Ford Coppola, based upon the novel by John Fante	
1982	The Murder of Napoleon	Script for Jack Nicholson, based upon the novel by Ben Weider and David Hapgood	
1983	The Mermaid	Script for Warren Beatty	
1985	The Little Blue Whale	Script for Don Bluth	
1990	Gittes vs. Gittes	Unproduced sequel script to The Two Jakes	
1994	Beverly Hills Cop III	Rejected script	
1994	The Night Manager	Script for Sydney Pollack, based upon the novel by John le Carré	
2002	Carter Beats the Devil	Director/producer, based upon the novel by Glen David Gold	
2003	The 39 Steps remake	Writer/director	
2009	Fertig	Script for David Fincher, based upon They Fought Alone by Maurice Buckmaster	
2011	Pompeii TV miniseries	Four-part series for Scott Free Productions, based on the book by Robert Harris	
2011	Compadre TV pilot	Teleplay for Scott Free Productions	
2011	Next of Kin	Script for David Fincher	
2011	The Battle of Britain	Script for Graham King	
2018	Dancing Bear TV pilot	Teleplay for Mel Gibson, based upon the novel by James Crumley	
2019	Untitled Chinatown prequel series	Teleplay for David Fincher, to be produced at Netflix	

== Legacy and honors ==
Awards

- Academy Award
  - 1974: Nominated, Best Adapted Screenplay, The Last Detail
  - 1975: Won, Best Original Screenplay, Chinatown
  - 1976: Nominated, Best Original Screenplay, Shampoo
  - 1985: Nominated, Best Adapted Screenplay, Greystoke: The Legend of Tarzan
- BAFTA Award
  - 1975: Won, Best Screenplay, The Last Detail and Chinatown
- Golden Globe Award
  - 1975: Won, Best Screenplay - Motion Picture, Chinatown
- Edgar Award
  - 1975: Won, Best Motion Picture, Chinatown (Author)
- Writers Guild of America Award
  - 1997: Laurel Award for Screenwriting Achievement
- Nantucket Film Festival
  - 2015: Screenwriters Tribute Award

In the book Fifty Filmmakers, journalist Andrew J. Rausch argues: "There is a strong case to be made that Robert Towne is the most gifted scribe ever to write for film. There can be little doubt that he is one of the finest ever."

== See also ==
- List of Russian Academy Award winners and nominees

== Bibliography ==
- Brady, John (1981). The Craft of the Screenwriter.
