= Burning Shore Press =

Established in 2005, Burning Shore Press is a publisher of serious "underground" literature and is based in Long Beach, California. It has thus far published the novel Heaping Stones, by Rob Woodard, and the play Don Giovanni, by Dan Fante, and Songs From The Shooting Gallery, the debut book of poetry from New York-based writer Tony O'Neill, Scheduled publications include What Love Is, Rob Woodard's second novel, The Boiler Room, Dan Fante's acclaimed first play, and King of Long Beach, Rob Woodard's first collection of poetry.
