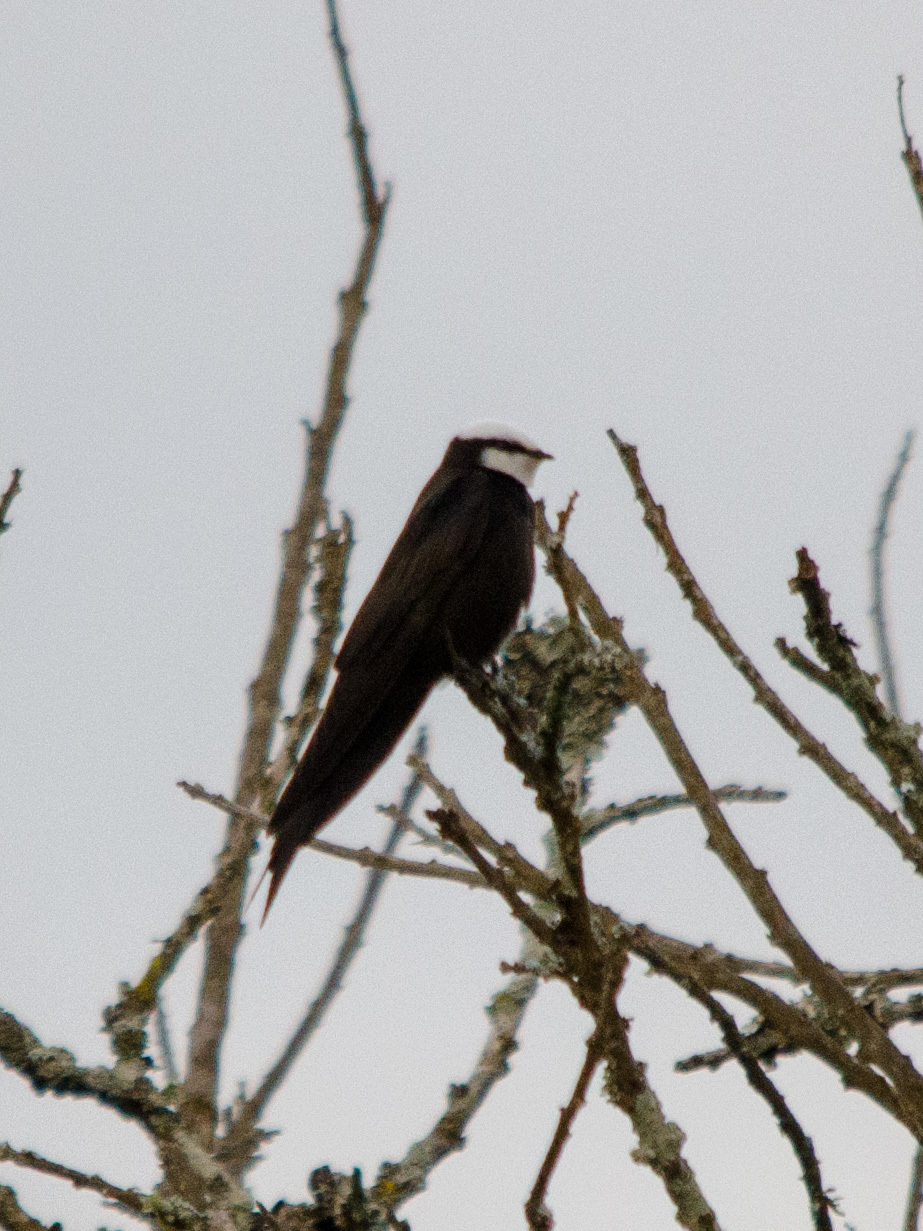
- Male
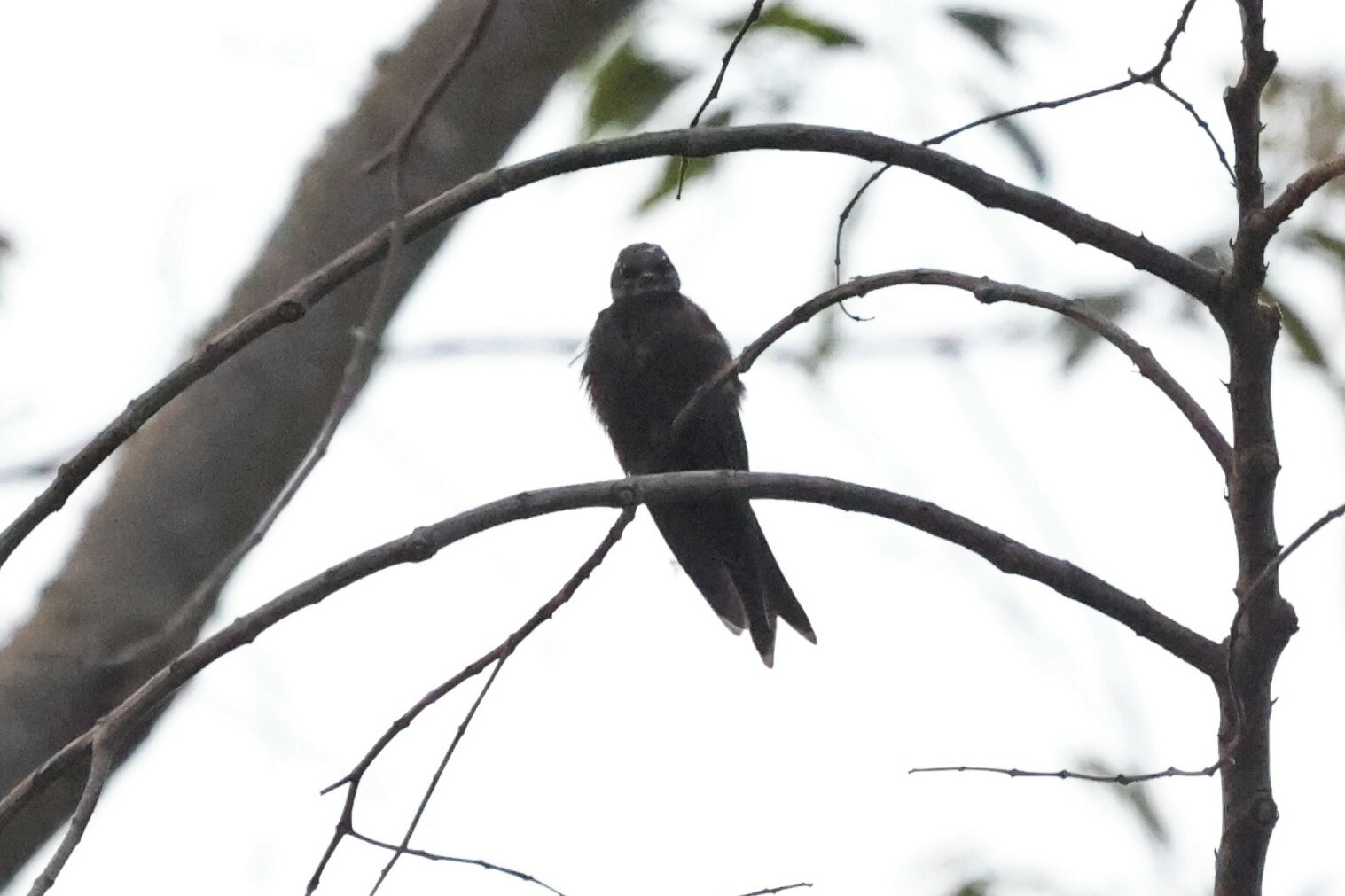
- Female

Conservation status
- Least Concern (IUCN 3.1)

Scientific classification
- Kingdom: Animalia
- Phylum: Chordata
- Class: Aves
- Order: Passeriformes
- Family: Hirundinidae
- Genus: Psalidoprocne
- Species: P. albiceps

Binomial name
- Psalidoprocne albiceps PL Sclater, 1864
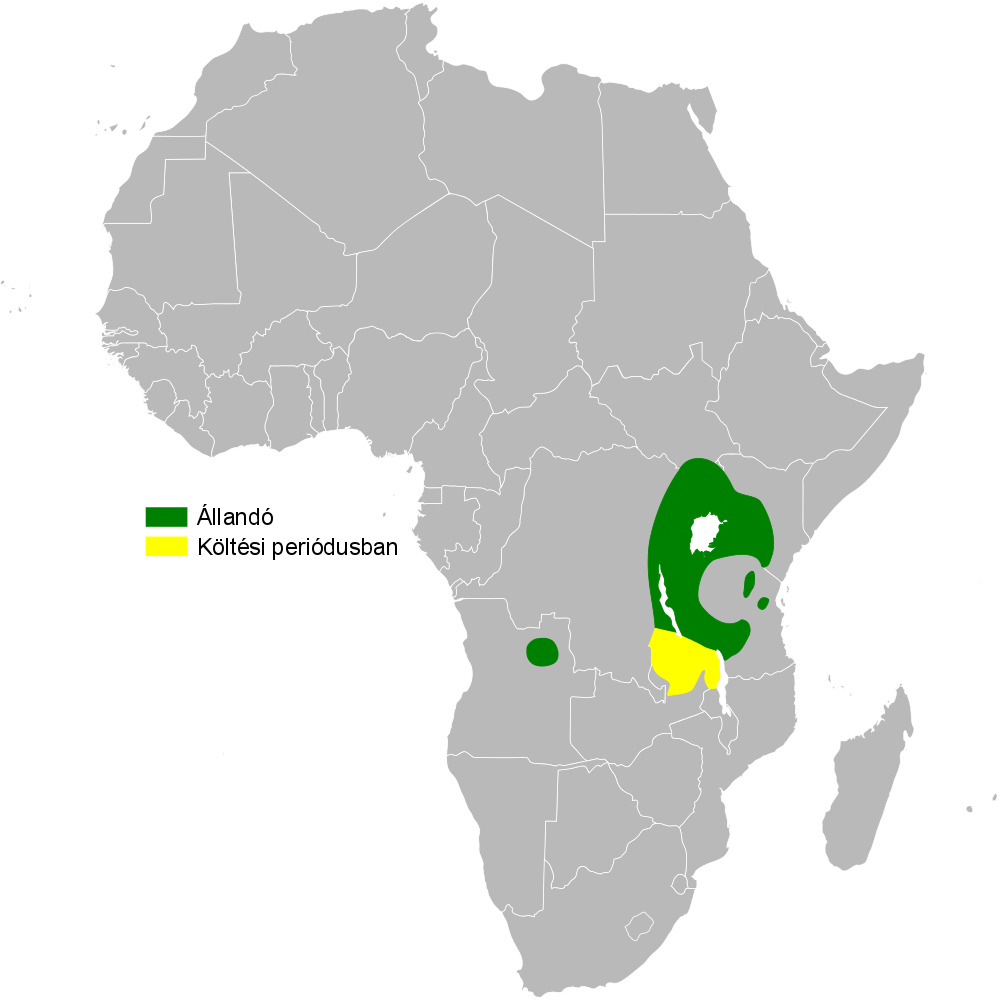

= White-headed saw-wing =

Species of bird

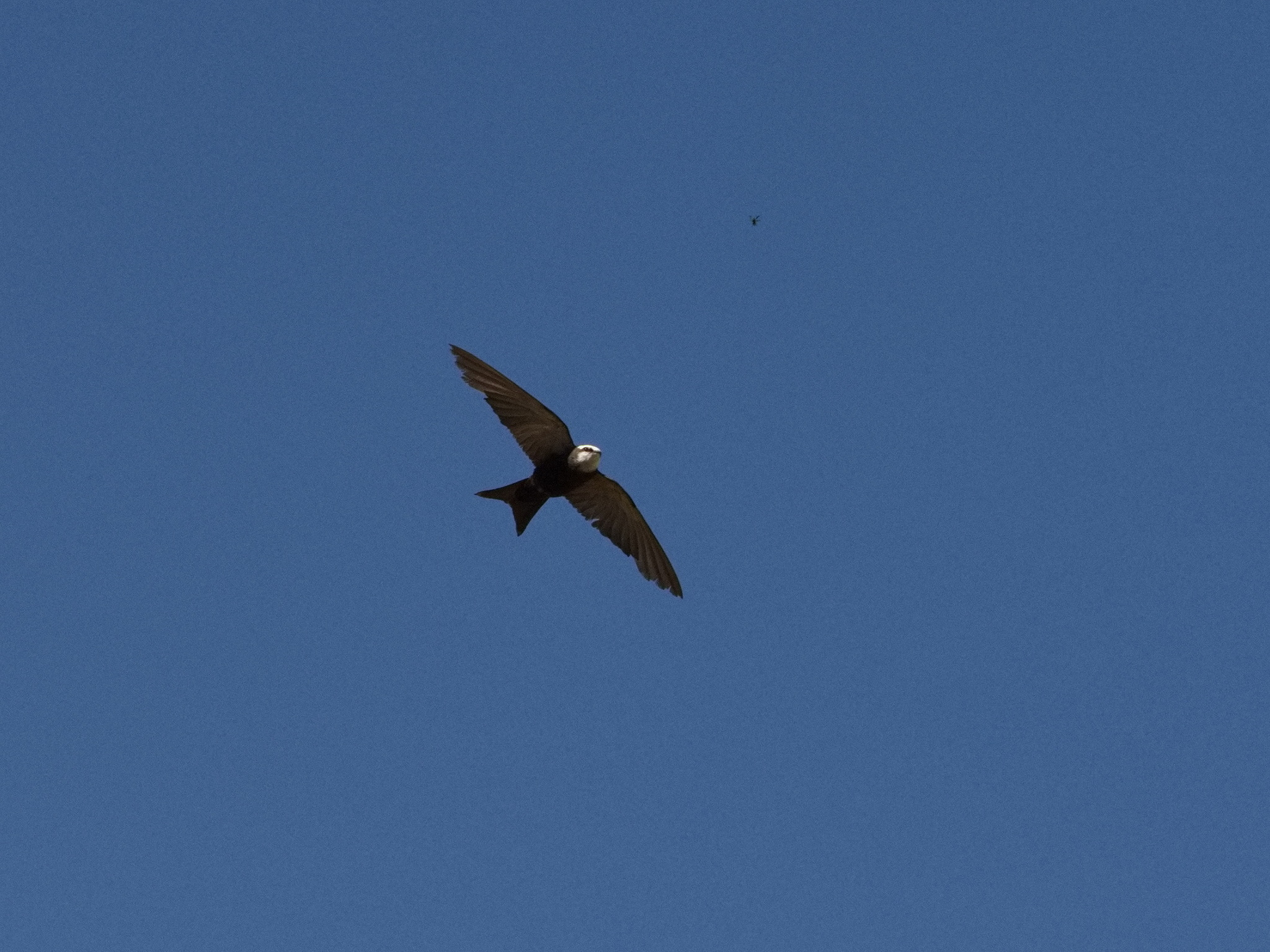
Male in flight

The white-headed saw-wing (Psalidoprocne albiceps), also known as the white-headed rough-winged swallow, is a species of bird in the family Hirundinidae. It is found in Angola, Burundi, Democratic Republic of the Congo, Ethiopia, Kenya, Malawi, Rwanda, South Sudan, Tanzania, Uganda, and Zambia.

This species has an extremely large range, and hence does not approach the thresholds for Vulnerable under the range size criterion (Extent of Occurrence <20,000 km combined with a declining or fluctuating range size, habitat extent/quality, or population size and a small number of locations or severe fragmentation). The population trend appears to be stable, and hence the species does not approach the thresholds for Vulnerable under the population trend criterion (>30% decline over ten years or three generations). The population size has not been quantified, but it is not believed to approach the thresholds for Vulnerable under the population size criterion (<10,000 mature individuals with a continuing decline estimated to be >10% in ten years or three generations, or with a specified population structure). For these reasons the species is evaluated as Least Concern by the IUCN.
