= Ask the Dust (film) =

2006 film

- Theatrical release poster
- Directed by: Robert Towne
- Screenplay by: Robert Towne
- Based on: Ask the Dust by John Fante
- Produced by: Tom Cruise; Paula Wagner; Don Granger; Jonas McCord
- Starring: Colin Farrell; Salma Hayek; Donald Sutherland; Eileen Atkins; Idina Menzel; Justin Kirk
- Cinematography: Caleb Deschanel
- Edited by: Robert K. Lambert
- Music by: Ramin Djawadi; Heitor Pereira
- Production companies: Capitol Films; Cruise/Wagner Productions; VIP 3 Medienfonds; Ascendant Pictures
- Distributed by: Paramount Classics (United States); Constantin Film (Germany)
- Release date: March 17, 2006
- Running time: 117 minutes
- Countries: United States; Germany
- Language: English
- Box office: $2.5 million

Ask the Dust is a 2006 romantic drama film based on the 1939 book Ask the Dust by John Fante. The film was written and directed by Robert Towne, and was his final film. Tom Cruise (with Paula Wagner and Cruise/Wagner Productions) served as one of the film's producers. The film was released on a limited basis on March 17, 2006, and was entered into the 28th Moscow International Film Festival. It was filmed almost entirely in South Africa with the use of stages to portray Los Angeles.

== Plot ==
The story is set during the Great Depression, specifically around the time of the 1933 Long Beach earthquake.

Camilla (Salma Hayek) is a fiery, beautiful Mexican café waitress who aspires to make something of herself and give her and her future children a place and chance in the world. Arturo (Colin Farrell) is a struggling writer who comes to Bunker Hill, Los Angeles to start his writing career. Though he falls in love with Camilla, he does not marry her. Later, Camilla is infected by tuberculosis and leaves Arturo without informing him. When Arturo finds her, she is about to die, and he promises to marry her, but Camilla dies, and Arturo writes a novel dedicated to Camilla. Arturo writes a dedication in one of his books to her and throws it into the sand.

== Cast ==
- Colin Farrell as Arturo Bandini
- Salma Hayek as Camilla Lopez
- Donald Sutherland as Hellfrick
- Eileen Atkins as Mrs. Hargraves
- Idina Menzel as Vera Rivkin
- Justin Kirk as Sammy
- Dion Basco as Patricio/houseboy
- Jeremy Crutchley as Solomon, the bartender
- William Mapother as Bill
- Tamara Craig Thomas as Sally

== Production ==
The rights to the novel once belonged to Mel Brooks, though he let them lapse. Towne met Fante in the 1970s and that led to his interest in the project. Despite finishing the script in the early 1990s, he couldn't find financial backing from a studio. During this time, Farrell's role was originally set to be played by Johnny Depp but he dropped out. Later Val Kilmer accepted the role and also dropped out. Another delay was Hayek initially rejecting the role to avoid being typecast as a Mexican immigrant. She accepted the role after eight years.

Part of the film was shot at Pinelands High School (Cape Town, South Africa), on fields modified to simulate a Los Angeles scenery. Scenes were also filmed at the very popular Sun City Resort in South Africa, specifically using the man-made beach at the Valley of Waves water park, for a romantic night-swim scene.

== Critical reception ==
The film received mixed reviews from critics. Review aggregator Rotten Tomatoes reported that 35% of critics gave the film positive reviews, based on 103 reviews, with an average rating of 5.1/10. The site's consensus states: "Though Hayek is luminous, Farrell seems miscast, and the film fails to capture the gritty, lively edginess of the book upon which it's based." Metacritic reported the film had an average score of 58 out of 100, based on 33 reviews, indicating "mixed or average" reviews.
