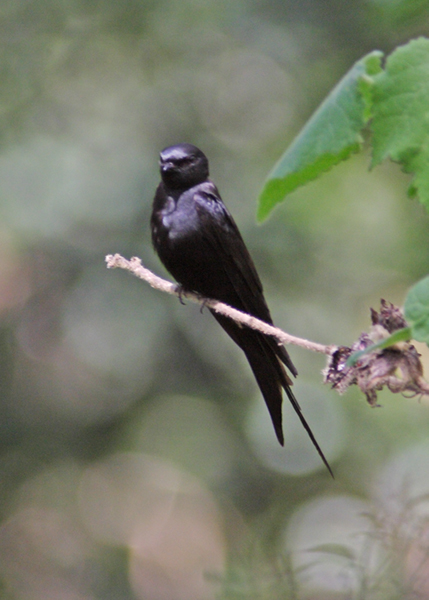
- Black saw-wing (Psalidoprocne pristoptera)

Scientific classification
- Kingdom: Animalia
- Phylum: Chordata
- Class: Aves
- Order: Passeriformes
- Family: Hirundinidae
- Subfamily: Hirundininae
- Genus: Psalidoprocne; Cabanis, 1851

Type species
- Psalidoprocne cypselina Cabanis, 1851

Species
- 6, See list

= Saw-wing =

Saw-wings

Genus of birds

The saw-wings, Psalidoprocne, is a small genus of passerine birds in the swallow family. The common name of this group is derived from the rough outer edge of the outer primary feather on the wing, which is rough due to recurved barbs. The function of this is unknown. The birds are 11–17 cm long and black or black-and-white in colour. The genus has an African distribution and all species can be found foraging over forest and woodland. The last part of their scientific name comes from the eldest daughter of King Pandion of Athens, Procne, who was turned into a swallow after tricking her abusive husband.

== Species list ==
There are six species of saw-wing. The black saw-wing has a large number of subspecies and many of these are sometimes considered to be separate species. The species, in taxonomic order, are:

Image	Scientific name	Common name	Distribution
	Psalidoprocne nitens	Square-tailed saw-wing	Angola, Cameroon, Central African Republic, Republic of the Congo, Democratic Republic of the Congo, Ivory Coast, Equatorial Guinea, Gabon, Ghana, Guinea, Liberia, Nigeria, and Sierra Leone.
	Psalidoprocne centralis	Congo saw-wing	Democratic Republic of the Congo
	Psalidoprocne fuliginosa	Mountain saw-wing	Bioko island and adjacent Mt. Cameroon.
	Psalidoprocne albiceps	White-headed saw-wing	Angola, Burundi, Democratic Republic of the Congo, Ethiopia, Kenya, Malawi, Rwanda, South Sudan, Tanzania, Uganda, and Zambia.
	Psalidoprocne pristoptera	Black saw-wing	across Africa from eastern Nigeria and Ethiopia south to Angola, northern Zimbabwe and northern Mozambique
	Psalidoprocne obscura	Fanti saw-wing	southern west Africa from Senegal to Cameroon
