= List of Academy Award nominees presented under false names =

There have been several fictional people or people using false names nominated for actual Academy Awards, in several cases because the actual winners were blacklisted at the time. This list is current as of the 94th Academy Awards.

== Winners ==
Pierre Boulle

- 1957 Best Writing Adapted Screenplay for The Bridge on the River Kwai

Despite not having written the screenplay and not even speaking English, Boulle (who had written the novel on which the film was based) was credited because the film's actual writers, Carl Foreman and Michael Wilson, had been blacklisted as communist sympathizers. On December 11, 1984, the Board of Governors voted posthumous Oscars to the duo.

Nathan E. Douglas

- 1958 Best Writing, Story and Screenplay – Written Directly for the Screen for The Defiant Ones

Nedrick Young and Harold Jacob Smith co-wrote the screenplay, but Young was blacklisted and used a pseudonym for his screen credit. As an inside joke, director Stanley Kramer cast Young and Smith in bit parts as truck drivers and had their screen credit appear while they were on screen together. In 1993, AMPAS restored Young's credit for this work.

- 1960 Best Writing, Screenplay – Based on Material from Another Medium for Inherit the Wind (nomination)

Young (as "Douglas") and Smith were later nominated again, but did not win.

Ian McLellan Hunter

- 1953 Best Story for Roman Holiday

The name was used as a cover for blacklisted writer Dalton Trumbo. On December 15, 1992, the Board of Governors voted to change the records and recognize Trumbo. Hunter's name was removed. However, Hunter's son, director Tim Hunter, refused to cede the award to Trumbo, so the Academy presented a second Academy Award.

Robert Rich

- 1956 Best Story for The Brave One

This was another cover for Trumbo. Shortly before his death, Trumbo revealed the much-suspected truth.

== Nominees ==
Roderick Jaynes

- 1997 Best Film Editing for Fargo
- 2007 Best Film Editing for No Country for Old Men

Writer-director brothers Joel and Ethan Coen have edited several of their films under this name.

Adrien Joyce

- 1971 Best Writing Original Screenplay for Five Easy Pieces

Carole Eastman wrote the film under this pseudonym with director Bob Rafelson.

Donald Kaufman

- 2003 Best Writing Adapted Screenplay for Adaptation.

Donald Kaufman was nominated along with his "brother" Charlie. In fact, Donald does not exist; the screenplay was written by Charlie alone, but credited to both. Donald was the first fictitious nominee not to be a cover for a real person. (Both appear as characters in the film.)

John Mac McMurphy

- 2013 Best Film Editing for Dallas Buyers Club

Director Jean-Marc Vallée edited his film using this pseudonym, inspired by the name of the character played by Jack Nicholson in the movie One Flew Over the Cuckoo's Nest.

P.H. Vazak

- 1985 Best Writing Adapted Screenplay for Greystoke: The Legend of Tarzan, Lord of the Apes.

Due to his disapproval of the final filmed script, Robert Towne used his dog's name as a pseudonym instead.

== See also ==
- Alan Smithee, a pseudonym used by directors who don't want their name attached to a film

== Sources ==
- Oscars site
