= Rob Woodard =

American novelist

Rob Woodard is an American novelist, poet and painter who lives in Long Beach, California. In addition to his "print" books, his work has also appeared on several internet-based literary journals, including Scotland's Laura Hird's website, England's Scarecrow, Ireland's Dogmatika and the UK's The Guardian.

== Selected works ==
- Edgewater: Poems 1992-2009 (Burning Shore Press, 2012)
- Heaping Stones (Burning Shore Press, 2005)

Two other books, What Love Is (a novel) and King Of Long Beach (poems) were rumored to be in the works in 2007/2008 but have not yet been published.
