= The Road to Los Angeles =

1985 novel by John Fante

The Road to Los Angeles is a novel by the American writer John Fante. It was written in 1936, but was published posthumously in 1985 by Black Sparrow Press. The novel is one of four featuring Fante's alter ego Arturo Bandini. In the Bandini chronology, it is set after Wait Until Spring, Bandini and before Ask the Dust.
