= Fanta (disambiguation) =

Fanta is a brand of fruit-flavored carbonated soft drinks.

Fanta may also refer to:

== Surname and nickname ==
- Fanta (footballer) (born 1966), Brazilian footballer
- Fanta Berete, French politician
- Berta Fanta, Czech intellectual figure
- Josef Fanta, Czech architect
- Josef Fanta (referee), Czech football manager, official and referee
- Peter Fanta, United States Navy admiral

== Given name ==
- Fanta Damba, Malian singer
- Fanta Dao, Malian runner
- Fanta Diagouraga, Congolese handball player
- Fanta Zara Kamaté, Ivorian footballer
- Fanta Keïta, Senegalese handball player
- Fanta Régina Nacro, Burkinabé film director
- Fanta Sacko, Malian singer
- Fanta Singhateh, Gambian politician

== Foods ==
- Fanta cake, cake of German origin

== See also ==
- Fanter (disambiguation)
