= John Zephaniah Holwell =

British surgeon (1711–1798)

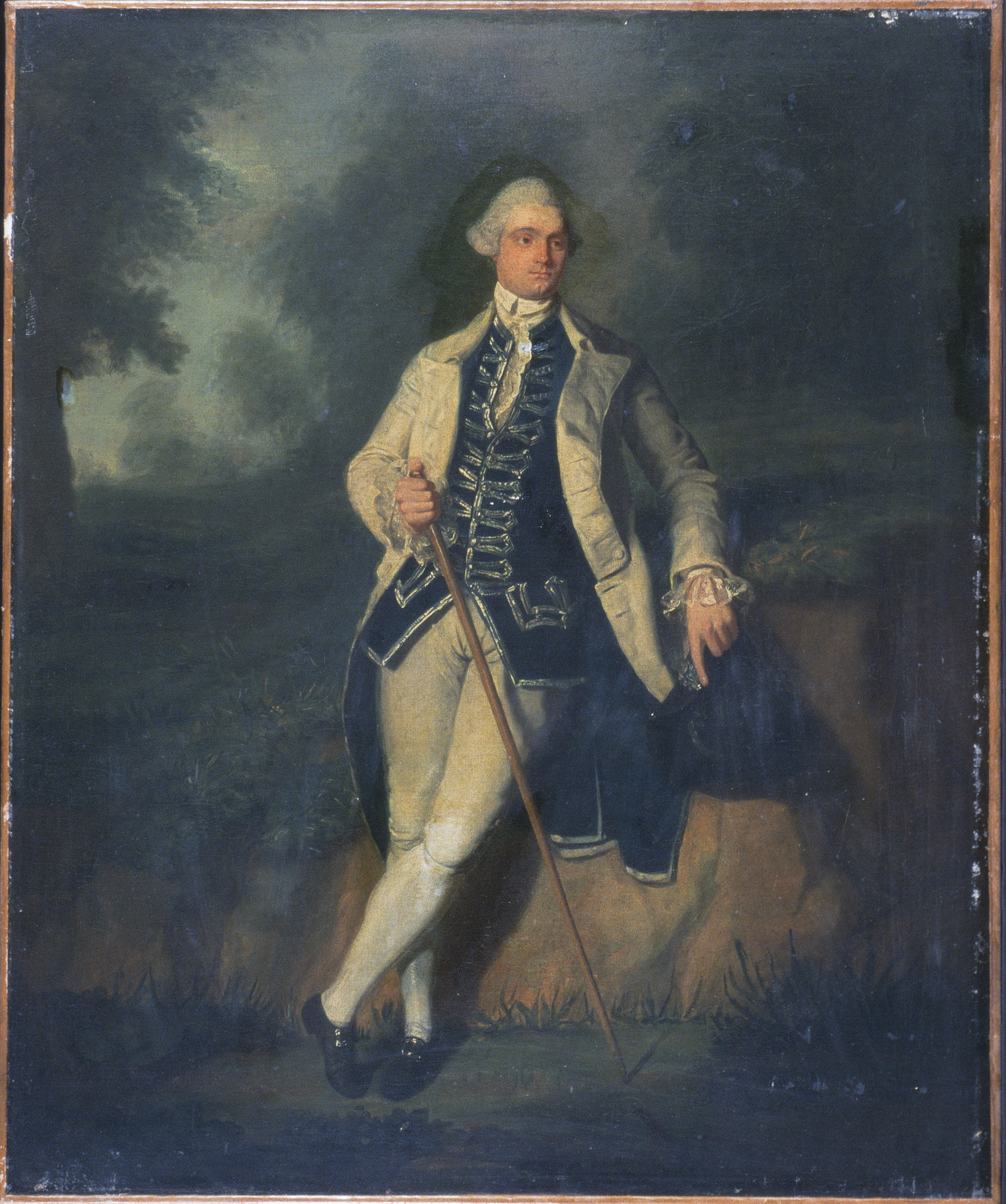
- Born: 17 September 1711; Dublin, Ireland
- Died: 5 November 1798 (87 years old); Pinner, Middlesex, Great Britain
- Occupation: Surgeon

John Zephaniah Holwell FRS (17 September 1711 – 5 November 1798) was a surgeon, an employee of the British East India Company, and a temporary Governor of Bengal (1760). He was also one of the first Europeans to study Indian antiquities and was an early advocate of animal rights and vegetarianism.

== Biography ==
Holwell was a survivor of the Black Hole of Calcutta, June 1756, the incident in which British citizens and others were crammed into a small poorly ventilated chamber overnight, with many deaths. Holwell's account of this incident (1757) obtained wide circulation in England and some claim this gained support for the East India Company's conquest of India. His account of the incident was not publicly questioned during his lifetime nor for more than a century after his death. However, in recent years, his version of the event has been called into question by many historians.

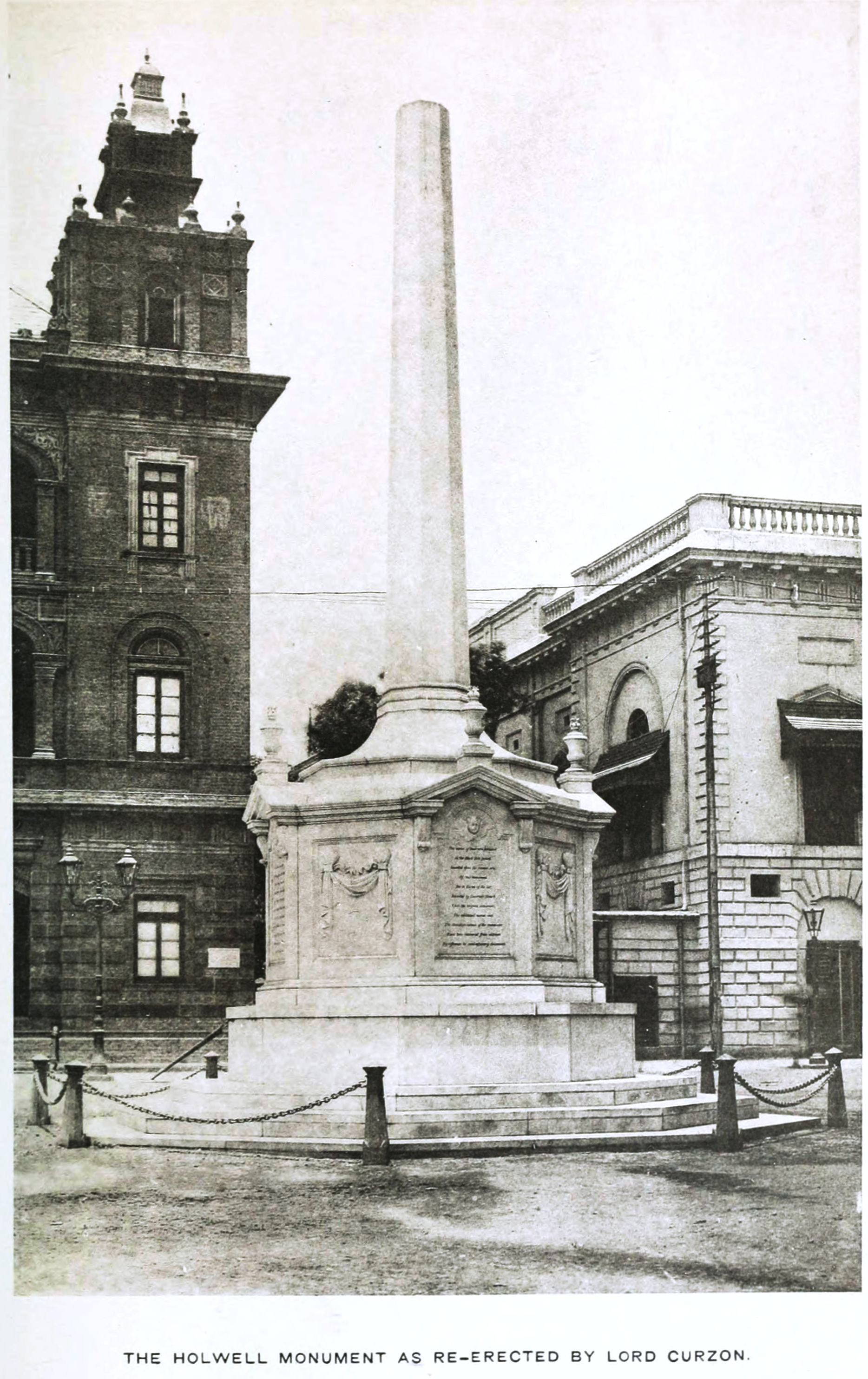
Holwell's monument in Calcutta

Holwell has also become an important source for modern historians of medicine, as a result of his description of the practice of smallpox variolation in eighteenth-century Bengal, An Account of the Manner of Inoculating for the Small Pox in the East Indies with Some Observations on the Practice and Mode of Treating that Disease in those Parts (London, 1767).

Born in Dublin, he grew up in London, and studied medicine at Guy's Hospital. He gained employment as a surgeon in the British East India Company and was sent to India in 1732. He served in this capacity until 1749. In 1751, he was appointed as zemindar of the Twenty-four Parganas District of Bengal. He then served as a member of the Council of Fort William (Calcutta) and defended the settlement against Siraj Ud Daulah in 1756. He later succeeded Robert Clive as temporary Governor of Bengal in 1760, but was dismissed from the Council in 1761 for remonstrating against the appointment of Henry Vansittart as Governor of Bengal. He was elected Fellow of the Royal Society in 1767.

== Study of Hinduism ==
Holwell was one of the first British travellers to study Hinduism. He came to believe that the Hindu scriptures completed and unlocked a secret meaning of the Bible. He wrote about this in the second and third volumes of his work Interesting Historical Events, Relative to the Provinces of Bengal, and the Empire of Indostan (1765–1771).

Holwell was a believer in metempsychosis (transmigration of souls). He came to the conclusion that the fundamental doctrine of the brahmins was that God (the Eternal one) had created angelic beings but they rebelled and so were condemned to be punished, with the possibility of earning a return to grace by passing through a series of rebirths to regain paradise. He held the view that all animals and humans were fallen angels.

Holwell suggested that the Greeks and Egyptians took their belief in metempsychosis from the brahmins. Holwell stated that all religions have much in common but only the Hindu scriptures have all the truths fully articulated. He wrote that Moses's version of the creation and Fall of Man is "clogged with too many incomprehensible difficulties to gain our belief", and is only made intelligible with the Hindu doctrine that humankind are fallen angels.

Holwell was a vegetarian and opposed the Cartesian view that animals are machines without souls. He argued that animals were not created for domination or use by man. He stated that meat and the killing of animals is a violation of man's original nature and is the cause of moral and physical evil.

Holwell believed that metempsychosis accounted for the problem of Original sin as the Fall of Man had occurred in heaven long before the creation of Adam and Eve who were fallen angels. In regard to Christianity, Holwell identified as a Christian deist, which was consistent with his belief in transmigration of souls and his enthusiasm for Hinduism.

== Publications ==
By Holwell:

- A Genuine Narrative of the Deplorable Deaths of the English Gentlemen and others who were suffocated in the Black Hole (London, 1758)
- Interesting Historical Events, Relative to the Provinces of Bengal, and the Empire of Indostan With a seasonable hint and perswasive to the honourable the court of directors of the East India Company. As also the mythology and cosmogony, fasts and festivals of the Gentoo's, followers of the Shastah. And a dissertation on the metempsychosis, commonly, though erroneously, called the Pythagorean doctrine, 3 vols. (London, 1765–1771)
- An Account of the Manner of Inoculating for the Small Pox in the East Indies with Some Observations on the Practice and Mode of Treating that Disease in those Parts (London, 1767).

== See also ==
- Urs App (2010). The Birth of Orientalism. Philadelphia: University of Pennsylvania Press (ISBN 978-0-8122-4261-4); contains a 66-page chapter (pp. 297–362) on Holwell.
- Dalley, Jan (2006). The Black Hole: Money, Myth and Empire. London: Penguin Books. ISBN 0-670-91447-9.
