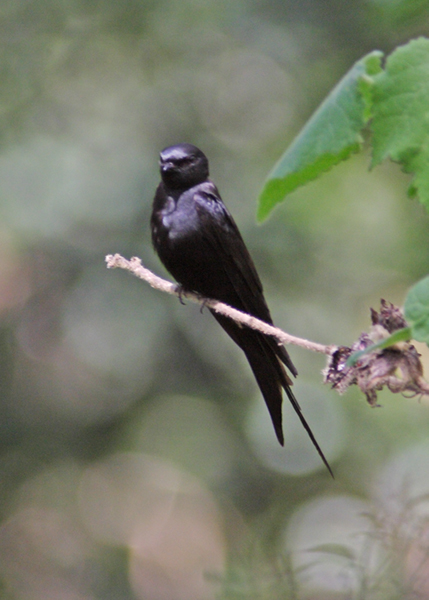

Conservation status
- Least Concern (IUCN 3.1)

Scientific classification
- Kingdom: Animalia
- Phylum: Chordata
- Class: Aves
- Order: Passeriformes
- Family: Hirundinidae
- Genus: Psalidoprocne
- Species: P. pristoptera

Binomial name
- Psalidoprocne pristoptera (Rüppell, 1840)
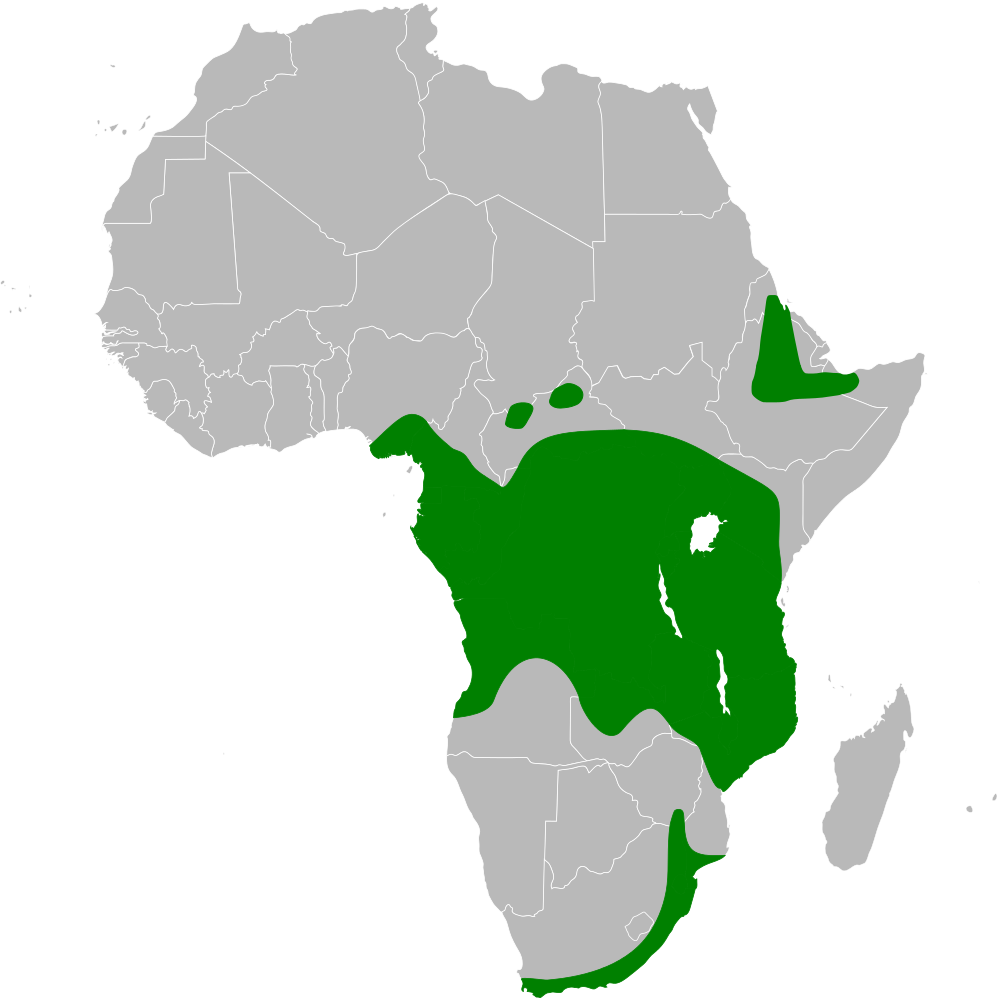

= Black saw-wing =

Species of bird

The black saw-wing (Psalidoprocne pristoptera), also known as the blue saw-wing or black rough-winged swallow, is a small passerine bird in the swallow family.

== Distribution and habitat ==
The black rough-winged swallow breeds in open wooded habitats, and has a preference for wetter areas, although some races occur in mountain grassland habitat. It breeds across Africa from eastern Nigeria and Ethiopia south to Angola, northern Zimbabwe and northern Mozambique. The subspecies P. p. holomelaena breeds down south-eastern Africa from southern Mozambique to the Cape in South Africa.

This species is mainly resident, apart from seasonal local or altitudinal movements, but P. p. holomelaena is migratory, spending the southern winter north of the breeding range. The nominate race P. p. pristoptera of the mountains of northern Ethiopia moves south after breeding.

== Description ==
The black rough-winged swallow is a small swallow at 13–15 cm length with a forked tail. Its plumage is blue-glossed black. Sexes are similar, but the female has shorter outer tail feathers, and less obvious wing serrations. Juveniles are brown with little gloss, and have short tails.

There are many subspecies of this swallow, which some authorities may split into different species. In particular, four northeastern races, including nominate P. p. pristoptera, have conspicuous white underwing coverts (all other subspecies are green-glossed and have completely dark underwings), and may be split as the eastern rough-winged swallow or eastern saw-wing (swallow), P. orientalis. This leaves P. p. holomelaena as the black rough-winged swallow, P. holomelaena. Other subspecies are also sometimes elevated to species status, but Turner and Rose take the view that all the races of the black rough-winged swallow are, at best, incipient species.

== Subspecies ==
- Shari saw-wing Psalidoprocne (pristoptera) chalybdea
- Petit's saw-wing Psalidoprocne (pristoptera) petiti
- Mangbettu saw-wing Psalidoprocne (pristoptera) mangbettorum
- Ethiopian saw-wing Psalidoprocne (pristoptera) oleaginea
- Blue saw-wing Psalidoprocne (pristoptera) pristoptera
- Brown saw-wing Psalidoprocne (pristoptera) antinorii
- Blanford's saw-wing Psalidoprocne (pristoptera) blanfordi
- Eastern saw-wing Psalidoprocne (pristoptera) orientalis
  - Includes the race reichenowi
- Black saw-wing Psalidoprocne (pristoptera) holomelas
  - Includes races massaica and ruwenzori

== Behaviour ==
Black rough-winged swallows are usually seen in pairs or small groups hunting for flying insects in woodland clearings and edges, above forest, or over water. Their flight is weak and fluttering. It is a quiet species, but it gives a soft chrrp alarm call. There is also a contact call described for as chirr chirr cheeeu for P. p. holomelaena and tseeu tseu tsss-ip for orientalis.

=== Breeding ===
The nest is constructed from grass, moss or similar materials, and built in a 30–60 cm long burrow in a vertical sand or clay bank. This is usually an old burrow of another species like a kingfisher, but may be excavated by the breeding pair. The clutch is two, sometimes three, white eggs. Only one parent, probably the female, incubates for 14–19 days to hatching, with a further 24–27 days until the young fledge.
