= Wait Until Spring, Bandini (film) =

1989 film by Dominique Deruddere

- Movie poster
- Directed by: Dominique Deruddere
- Screenplay by: Dominique Deruddere
- Based on: Wait Until Spring, Bandini by John Fante
- Produced by: Shay Cunliffe; Tom Luddy; Erwin Provoost; Fred Roos
- Starring: Joe Mantegna; Faye Dunaway; Burt Young
- Cinematography: Jean-François Robin
- Edited by: Ludo Troch
- Music by: Angelo Badalamenti
- Production company: Zoetrope Studios
- Distributed by: Orion Classics
- Release date: 29 June 1989 (US)
- Running time: 100 min.
- Countries: Belgium; France; Italy; United States
- Language: English

Wait Until Spring, Bandini is a 1989 film written and directed by Dominique Deruddere, based upon the novel of the same name by John Fante. The film received the André Cavens Award for Best Film and won three Joseph Plateau Awards.

== Plot ==
The film follows the Bandini family as they struggle through hard times in 1920s Colorado. Unemployed and broke, Svevo Bandini (Joe Mantegna) tries to come up with the money his family needs to make it through the winter, while putting up with his difficult mother-in-law (Renata Vanni), his nervous wife (Ornella Muti), and his three young boys.

== Principal cast ==
- Joe Mantegna as Svevo Bandini
- Ornella Muti as Maria Bandini
- Faye Dunaway as Mrs. Hildegarde
- Michael Bacall as Arturo Bandini
- Daniel Wilson as August Bandini
- Alex Vincent as Federico Bandini
- Burt Young as Rocco Saccone
- Tanya Lopert as Sister Celia
- Renata Vanni as Donna Toscana
- Jean-Louis Sbille as Bank Employee

== Production ==
Parts of the film were shot in Orem and Ogden, Utah.
