= Gabriele Fanti =

Italian footballer

FantiSeven
Personal information
- Date of birth: 22 April 2000 (age 26)
- Place of birth: Cerignola, Italy
- Position: Defender

Team information
- Current team: CSA
- Number: 69

Youth career
- –2018: Atalanta

Senior career*
Years	Team	Apps	(Gls)
2018–2020	Atalanta	0	(0)
2018–2020	→ Pergolettese (loan)	39	(0)
2020–	Franciacorta	1	(0)
- * Club domestic league appearances and goals as of 4 October 2020

Gabriele Fanti (born 22 April 2000) is an Italian football player. He plays for Franciacorta.

== Club career ==
He is a product of youth teams of Atalanta. On 18 July 2018, he joined Pergolettese on loan, in Serie D at the time.

For the 2019–20 season, Pergolettese was promoted to Serie C. He made his professional Serie C debut for Pergolettese on 1 September 2019 in a game against Pistoiese. He substituted Aboubakar Bakayoko in the 69th minute. He made his first professional start on 22 September 2019 against Novara.

On 29 September 2020 he moved to Serie D club Franciacorta.
