= Milhaven =

Post-rock band from Germany

- Origin: Bochum, Germany
- Genres: Post-rock
- Years active: 2004–2012
- Labels: 12rec. Records, Valeot Records
- Past members: Jens Reichelt (drums); Johannes Zagermann (bass); Christoph Freudenberg (guitar); Andreas Fanter (guitar)
- Website: milhaven.org/

Milhaven were a four-piece post-rock band from Bochum, Germany, on the label 12rec. Their sound has been compared to that of various post-rock bands, most notably Godspeed You! Black Emperor, whom the band has quoted as an influence. According to the band's biography, their title roots from the name of a German town with significance to their parents. The band has toured with Caspian and Boris.

== History ==
=== Strawberry Alarm Clock and Kraftwerk ===
As the band Strawberry Alarm Clock began breaking up, many members moved to Germany where they met local band Kraftwerk. The two bands became close, and their children lived their childhoods together as good friends. With the intentions of a new musical path, the offspring of the two bands formed Milhaven.

=== Bars Closing Down and I.M. Wagner EP ===
Beginning first with practice and then moving toward shows, the band received attention from Sven Swift, an experimental German producer, who led the band to record their debut Bars Closing Down on the label 12rec., on February 4, 2005. According to band's website, the album received the most downloads out of all the label's catalog.

Having given their label positive attention, they were given new equipment and the use of a 10-track hard-drive recorder, with which they utilized to record their latest release, I.M. Wagner EP, in early 2006. The 4-track EP was put out on November 2, 2006 to generally positive acclaim. Milhaven have been touring with Caspian.

=== Milhaven ===
In 2010, the band released another full-length album on Austrian-based Valeot Records in a packaging designed and hand-crafted by the band. In June 2011, Milhaven supported Amplifier and dredg in a concert in Dortmund, Germany.

== Discography ==
=== Studio albums ===
- Bars Closing Down (February 4, 2005)
- Milhaven (February 8, 2010)

=== EPs ===
- I.M. Wagner (November 2, 2006)
- Automata EP (January 17, 2012)

=== Compilations ===
- "We Talk, We Die (New Years Edit)", on Keepin' It Real In 2005, a 12Rec. Sampler.
- "Cold Stars (Live At AZ/Muelheim)", on Like U Don't Care, released in 2005.
- "Look, Victory!" & "Drink A Pint of Blood a Day" on Bokham City Rocks Vol. II a compilation by Bokham City Rocks
- "Oh, Great Pacific" on By Perseverance The Snail Reached Art, a compilation by Openmusiccontest.org
- "Clean Room" on Share It. Spread It. Love IT., a compilation by Metawelle.net
