= Joyce Fante =

American writer, wife of John Fante

Joyce Fante (1913–2005) was an American poet and editor. She was married to writer John Fante from 1937 to his death in 1983.

== Career ==
She was born in Placer County, California, the second daughter of Joseph and Louise Smart, early pioneers of the area. Her father was born in the small gold-mining town of Dutch Flat in the Sierra Nevada and was the son of Daniel Smart, who come to California in 1851 during the Gold Rush. Her mother, Louise Smart (born Louise Runchel), was a school teacher.

Joyce Smart was raised in Roseville, California, and attended Stanford University. She wrote for The American Mercury, and also played the piano. She met Fante on January 30, 1937, and they were married later that year, on July 13, in Reno, Nevada.
