= Wait Until Spring, Bandini =

1938 novel by John Fante

- Title page for Wait Until Spring, Bandini (1983 edition)
- Author: John Fante
- Language: English
- Series: Bandini Quartet
- Genre: Roman à clef
- Publisher: Stackpole Books
- Publication date: 1938
- Publication place: United States
- Media type: Print (hardback & paperback)
- Followed by: The Road to Los Angeles

Wait Until Spring, Bandini is a novel by American author John Fante. Released in 1938, it was his first published novel. The book is set in a small-town in Colorado and tells the story of the Bandini family during a winter in the Great Depression. It is the first book in the Bandini Quartet, a semi-autobiographical series of books about Arturo Bandini, the son of Italian immigrants to the United States. The novel was adapted into a 1989 film of the same name starring Joe Mantegna as Svevo Bandini, Ornella Muti as Maria Bandini, and Faye Dunaway as Mrs. Hildegarde.
