= Bartolomeo Fanti =

Italian monk (c. 1428–1495); beatified

Blessed Bartolomeo Fanti OCarm.
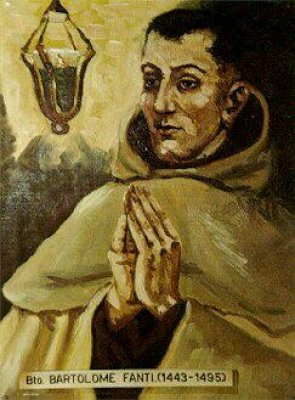

Priest
- Born: c. 1428; Mantua, Captaincy-General of Mantua
- Died: 5 December 1495 (aged 67); Mantua, Margravate of Mantua
- Venerated in: Roman Catholic Church
- Beatified: 18 March 1909, Saint Peter's Basilica, Kingdom of Italy by Pope Pius X
- Feast: 5 December
- Attributes: Carmelite habit

Bartolomeo Fanti (c. 1428 - 5 December 1495) was an Italian Roman Catholic priest from the Carmelite order in Mantua. Fanti served as the spiritual director and rector of a religious movement in his hometown and oversaw the establishment of their rule and statutes while himself serving as a novice master for his own order where he became known for being an effective preacher.

Pope Pius X beatified Fanti on 18 March 1909 upon the confirmation of his local 'cultus' - or popular devotion - rather than following the main process for beatification.

== Life ==
Bartolomeo Fanti was born in Mantua around 1428. He became a professed member of the Carmelite order at the age of seventeen at which point he received the white habit of the order.

Fanti became the spiritual director and the rector of the Confraternity of the Blessed Virgin Mary on 1 January 1460 for which he also composed their rule and statues; he was even a member of that confraternity since 28 February 1452. He was also the spiritual teacher of Giovanni Battista Spagnuolo and became well known for being an effective preacher with an ardent devotion to the Eucharist. Fanti served as a novice master for the Carmelites at some stage in the latter half of his life.

He died on 5 December 1495 in Mantua. His remains were relocated to another chapel in 1516 and again in 1783 to the church of Saint Mark in Mantua before being relocated for the final time to another chapel elsewhere in 1793 a decade later.

== Beatification ==
His beatification received the papal approval of Pope Pius X on 18 March 1909 as 'cultus' (local devotion) confirmation rather than following the usual requirement for recognized miracles.
