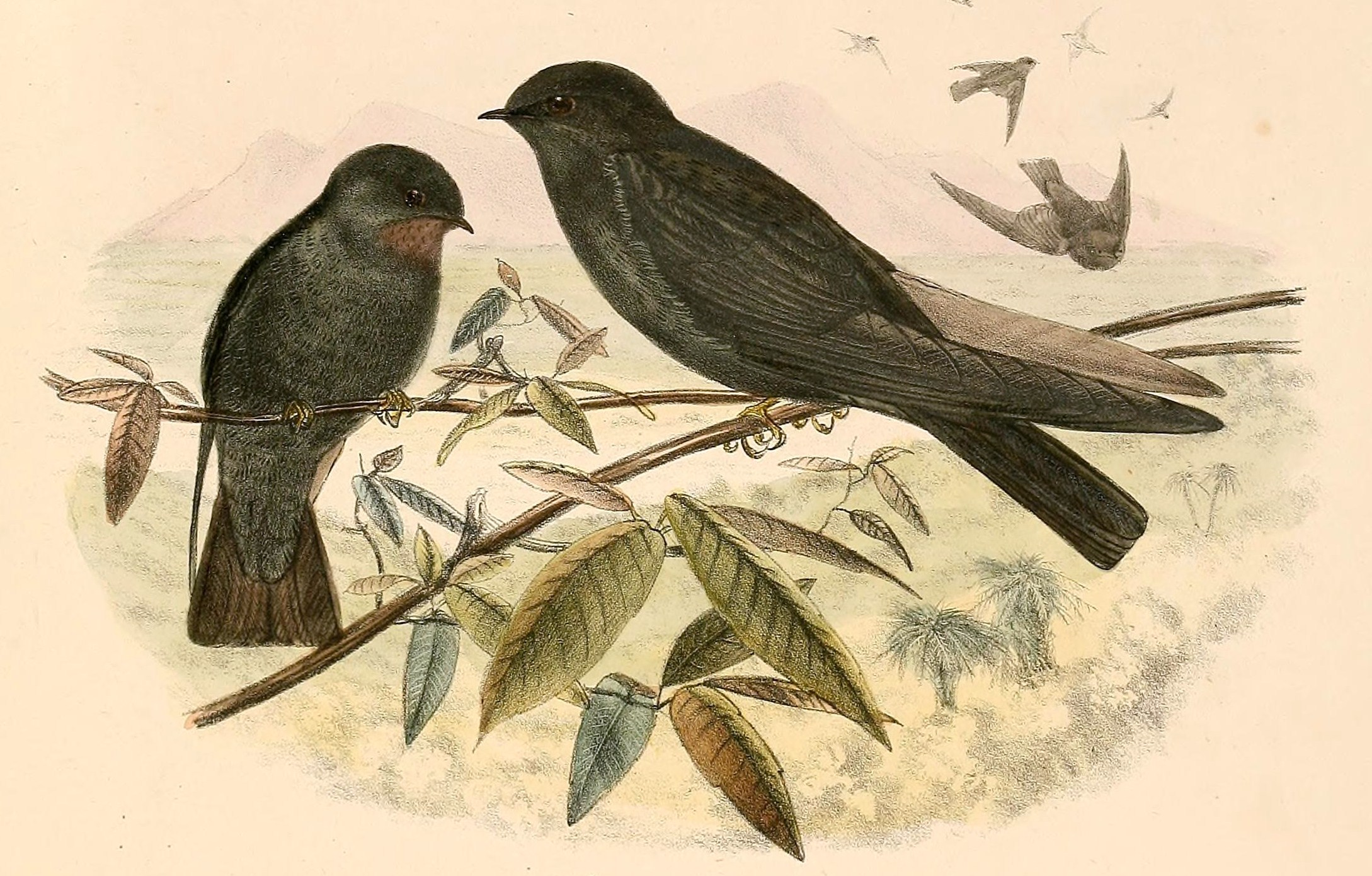

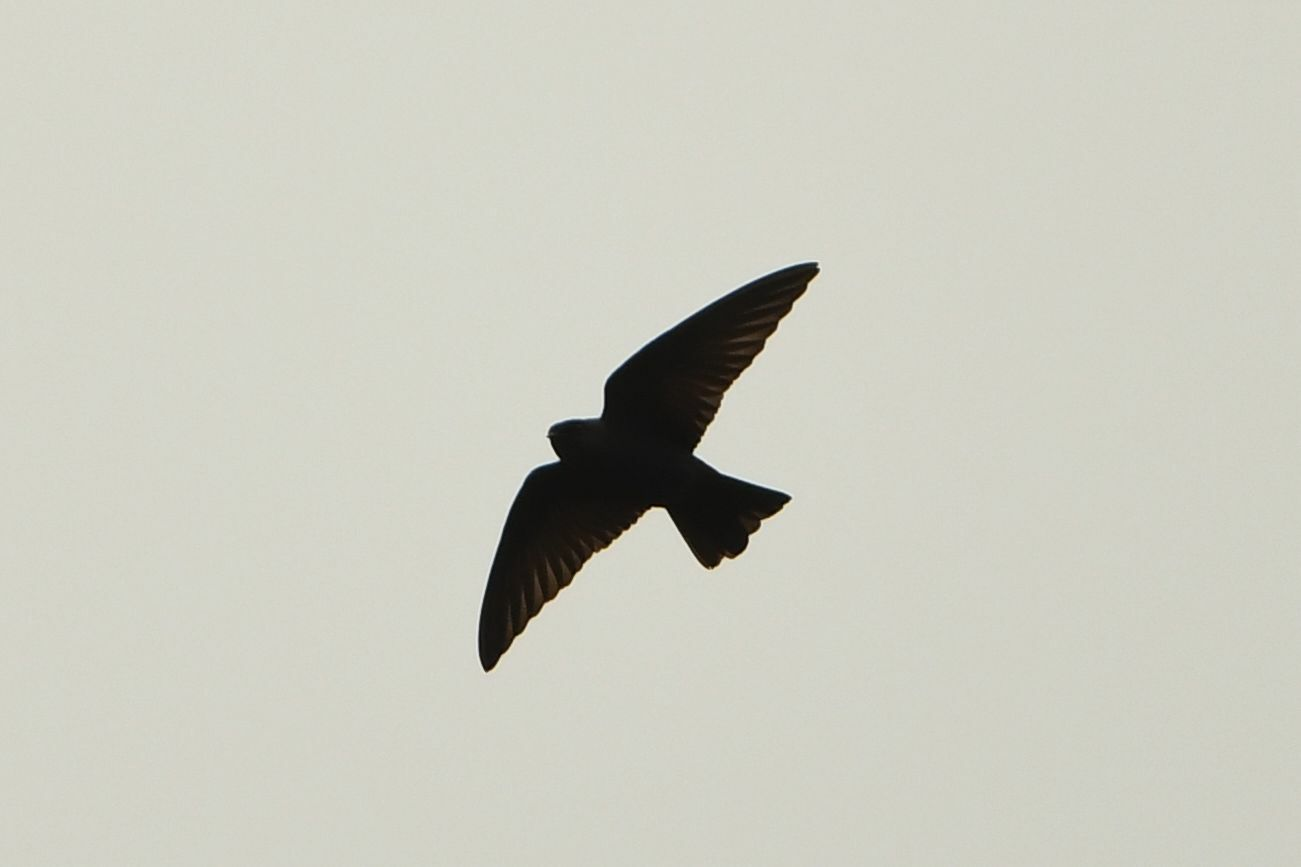

Conservation status
- Least Concern (IUCN 3.1)

Scientific classification
- Kingdom: Animalia
- Phylum: Chordata
- Class: Aves
- Order: Passeriformes
- Family: Hirundinidae
- Genus: Psalidoprocne
- Species: P. nitens

Binomial name
- Psalidoprocne nitens (Cassin, 1857)
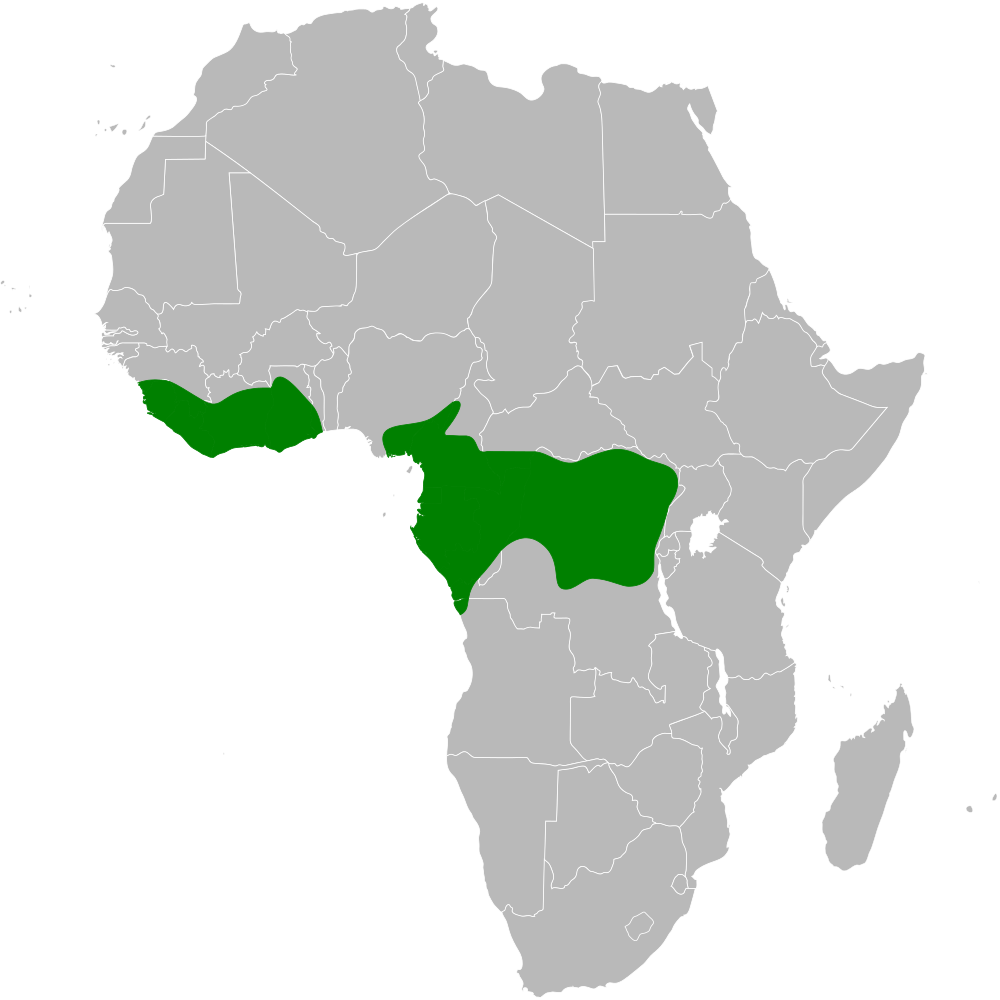
- Includes range of P. centralis

= Square-tailed saw-wing =

Species of bird

The square-tailed saw-wing (Psalidoprocne nitens), also known as the square-tailed rough-winged swallow, is a species of bird in the family Hirundinidae. It is native to the African tropical rainforest.

== Description ==
It is dark green, almost black.

== Distribution ==
This species occurs in Guinea, Sierra Leone, Ivory Coast, Ghana, Togo, Nigeria, Gabon, Congo and Angola.
