= Ask the Dust =

Novel by John Fante

- First edition
- Author: John Fante
- Language: English
- Series: Bandini Quartet
- Genre: Roman à clef
- Publisher: Stackpole Sons
- Publication date: 1939
- Publication place: United States
- Media type: Print (hardback & paperback)
- Pages: 235
- ISBN: 0-06-082255-4
- OCLC: 63537603
- Preceded by: Wait Until Spring, Bandini
- Followed by: Dago Red

Ask the Dust is the most popular novel of American author John Fante, first published in 1939 and set during the Great Depression era in Los Angeles. It is one of a series of novels featuring the character Arturo Bandini as Fante's alter ego, a young Italian-American from Colorado struggling to make it as a writer in Los Angeles.

The novel is widely regarded as an American classic, regularly on college syllabi for American literature. The book is a roman à clef, much of it rooted in autobiographical incidents in Fante's life. The novel influenced Charles Bukowski significantly. In 2006, screenwriter Robert Towne adapted the novel into a film, Ask the Dust, starring Salma Hayek and Colin Farrell.

== Publication ==
Initial publication of the novel followed Fante's successful publication of Wait Until Spring, Bandini and his short stories in prominent publications such as The American Mercury. Only 2,200 copies of the first edition of the novel were printed. Although sales were not extensive, a paperback edition was issued by Bantam in 1954. The novel's popularity did not reach its peak until poet Charles Bukowski led the reissue of the novel by Black Sparrow Press in 1980, alongside a foreword by Bukowski.

== Synopsis ==
Arturo Dominic Bandini is a struggling writer living in a residential hotel in Bunker Hill, a rundown section of Downtown Los Angeles. Living off oranges, he unconsciously creates a picture of Los Angeles as a modern dystopia during the Great Depression era. His published short story "The Little Dog Laughed" impresses no one in his seedy boarding house except for one 14-year-old girl, Judy. Destitute, he wanders into the Columbia Buffet where he meets Camilla Lopez, a waitress.

Bandini falls in love with Lopez, who is herself in love with her co-worker Sammy. Sammy despises Camilla, telling Bandini that he has to treat Camilla poorly if he wants to win her over. Bandini struggles with his own poverty, his Catholic guilt, and with his love for an unstable and deteriorating Camilla. Camilla is eventually admitted to a mental hospital and moved to a second one before escaping. Bandini looks for her, only to find her waiting for him in his apartment. He decides to take her away from Los Angeles, and arranges to live in a house on the beach. He buys her a little dog and they rent a place in Laguna Beach. He leaves her there to retrieve his belongings from his Los Angeles hotel room, only to find the house empty when he returns. He receives a telegram from Sammy, who requests that he come and retrieve Camilla, as she has shown up at the desert shack he has been living in and is getting on his nerves. By the time Bandini gets there, Sammy has thrown Camilla out and she has wandered into the desert. Bandini looks for her with an agonizing fear that he won't find the woman he loves, a fear that is soon realized. He returns to Sammy's shack and looks out at the empty desert land. He takes a copy of his first novel that has recently been published, dedicates it to Camilla, and throws it into the desert.

== Themes ==
Arturo Bandini serves as Fante's alter ego throughout the Bandini Quartet. Recurring themes in Fante's works are poverty, Catholicism, family life, Italian-American identity, sports, and the life of a writer.

== Reception ==
Initial reception of the novel was mixed, resulting in poor sales. Distribution was hampered because Fante's publisher was embroiled in a legal dispute over publication of an unauthorized version of Adolf Hitler's biography Mein Kampf that left it short of funds.

== Legacy ==
Fante was one of the first writers to portray the tough times faced by many people in Depression-era Los Angeles. Robert Towne has called Ask the Dust the greatest novel ever written about Los Angeles.

The American author Charles Bukowski cites John Fante's work as a significant influence on his own writing, in particular Ask the Dust, which he had stumbled upon in the public library as a young writer. Bukowski's enthusiasm for the novel helped ensure that the novel didn't fall into obscurity in the 1970s. Bukowski, who befriended the older author towards the end of Fante's life, wrote a foreword to this novel for the Black Sparrow Press reprint edition. Bukowski states in this foreword: "Fante was my god". Bukowski chronicled their relationship in his short story "I Meet the Master", although in the story, the author is referred to as "John Bante" and his book is called Sporting Times? Yeah?.

Ask the Dust contains thematic similarities to Knut Hamsun's 1890 novel Hunger. Fante was a great admirer of Hamsun. The title Ask the Dust derives from Knut Hamsun's novel Pan from 1894, in which Lt. Glahn tells the story about the girl in the tower:

"The other one he loved like a slave, like a crazed and like a beggar. Why? Ask the dust on the road and the falling leaves, ask the mysterious God of life; for no one knows such things. She gave him nothing, no nothing did she give him and yet he thanked her. She said: Give me your peace and your reason! And he was only sorry she did not ask for his life."

In David Foster Wallace's 1987 novel The Broom of the System, Lavache "Stoney" Beadsman has a wooden leg with a hidden drawer in which he keeps marijuana cigarettes and other illegal substances. Chapter 4 of Ask the Dust refers to a character named Benny Cohen, who "had a wooden leg with a little door in it. Inside the door were marijuana cigarettes. He sold them for fifteen cents apiece."
