= John Fante =

American writer (1909–1983)

- Born: April 8, 1909; Denver, Colorado, U.S.
- Died: May 8, 1983 (aged 74); Los Angeles, California, U.S.
- Occupations: Novelist; short-story writer; screenwriter
- Spouse: Joyce Fante (m. 1937)
- Children: 4, including Dan
- Writing career
- Period: 1938–1982
- Notable works: Wait Until Spring, Bandini (1938); Ask the Dust (1939); Full of Life (1952)
- Movement: Dirty realism

John Fante (April 8, 1909 – May 8, 1983) was an American novelist, short-story writer, and screenwriter. He is best known for his semi-autobiographical novel Ask the Dust (1939) about the life of Arturo Bandini, a struggling writer in Depression-era Los Angeles. It is widely considered the great Los Angeles novel, and is one in a series of four, published between 1938 and 1985, that are now collectively called "The Bandini Quartet." Ask the Dust was adapted into a 2006 film starring Colin Farrell and Salma Hayek. Fante's published works while he lived included five novels, one novella, and a short story collection. Additional works, including two novels, two novellas, and two short story collections, were published posthumously. His screenwriting credits include, most notably, Full of Life (1956, based on his 1952 novel by that name), Jeanne Eagels (1957), and the 1962 films Walk on the Wild Side and The Reluctant Saint.

== Early life ==
Fante was born in Denver, Colorado, on April 8, 1909, to an Italian-American family. His father, Nicola Fante, was born in Torricella Peligna (Abruzzo) and his mother, Mary Capolungo, a devout Catholic of Lucanian descent, was born in Chicago, Illinois. Nicola Fante was a bricklayer and stonemason, who drank and gambled to excess, leaving the Fante family to experience bouts of poverty. Fante attended various Catholic schools including Regis High School, before briefly enrolling at the University of Colorado. He dropped out of college in 1929 and “hitchhiked to Los Angeles at age 24” to focus on his writing.

Fante and Joyce Smart met on January 30, 1937, and were married on July 31 of that same year in Reno, Nevada.

== Career ==
After many unsuccessful attempts at publishing stories in the highly regarded literary magazine The American Mercury, his short story "Altar Boy" was accepted conditionally by the magazine's editor, H. L. Mencken. With Mencken's help, in 1938 Fante published his first novel, Wait Until Spring, Bandini. The following year, his best known novel, the semi-autobiographical Ask the Dust, appeared. “Much of the book focuses on Main Street and Pershing Square” in downtown Los Angeles, natural habitat of the “poor Los Angeles poet” who was the novel's protagonist.

Bandini served as his alter ego in a total of four novels, often known as "The Bandini Quartet": Wait Until Spring, Bandini (1938), The Road to Los Angeles (chronologically second in the saga, this is the first novel Fante wrote, but it was unpublished until 1985), Ask the Dust (1939) and finally Dreams from Bunker Hill (1982), which was dictated to his wife, Joyce, “from his hospital bed.”

His short story collection, Dago Red, was originally published in 1940, and then republished with a few additional stories in 1985 under the title The Wine of Youth.

Starting in the 1950s, Fante made a living primarily as a screenwriter, building a lucrative career writing mostly unproduced screenplays. According to a local historian, “He wrote movie scripts with drinking partner William Faulkner in the 1940s, and was still active in the studios in the 1950s and 1960s.”

Fante's screenwriting credits include the comedy-drama Full of Life (1957), based on his 1952 novel of the same name, which starred Judy Holliday and Richard Conte, and was nominated for Best Written American Comedy at the 1957 WGA Awards. He also co-wrote Walk on the Wild Side (1962), which stars Jane Fonda in her second credited film role, based on the novel by Nelson Algren. His other screenplay credits include Dinky, Jeanne Eagels, My Man and I, The Reluctant Saint, Something for a Lonely Man, and Six Loves. As Fante himself often admitted, most of what he wrote for the screen was simply hackwork intended to bring in a paycheck.

In the late 1970s, at the suggestion of novelist and poet Charles Bukowski, who had accidentally discovered Fante's work in the Los Angeles Public Library, Black Sparrow Press began to republish the (then out-of-print) works of Fante, creating a resurgence in his popularity.

== Later life and death ==
Fante was diagnosed with diabetes in 1955, which ultimately cost him his eyesight and led to the 1977 amputation of his toes and feet, and later legs. He died on May 8, 1983.

Fante and Joyce raised four children in Malibu, California, including Dan Fante, an author and playwright who died in 2015.

== Legacy and recognition ==
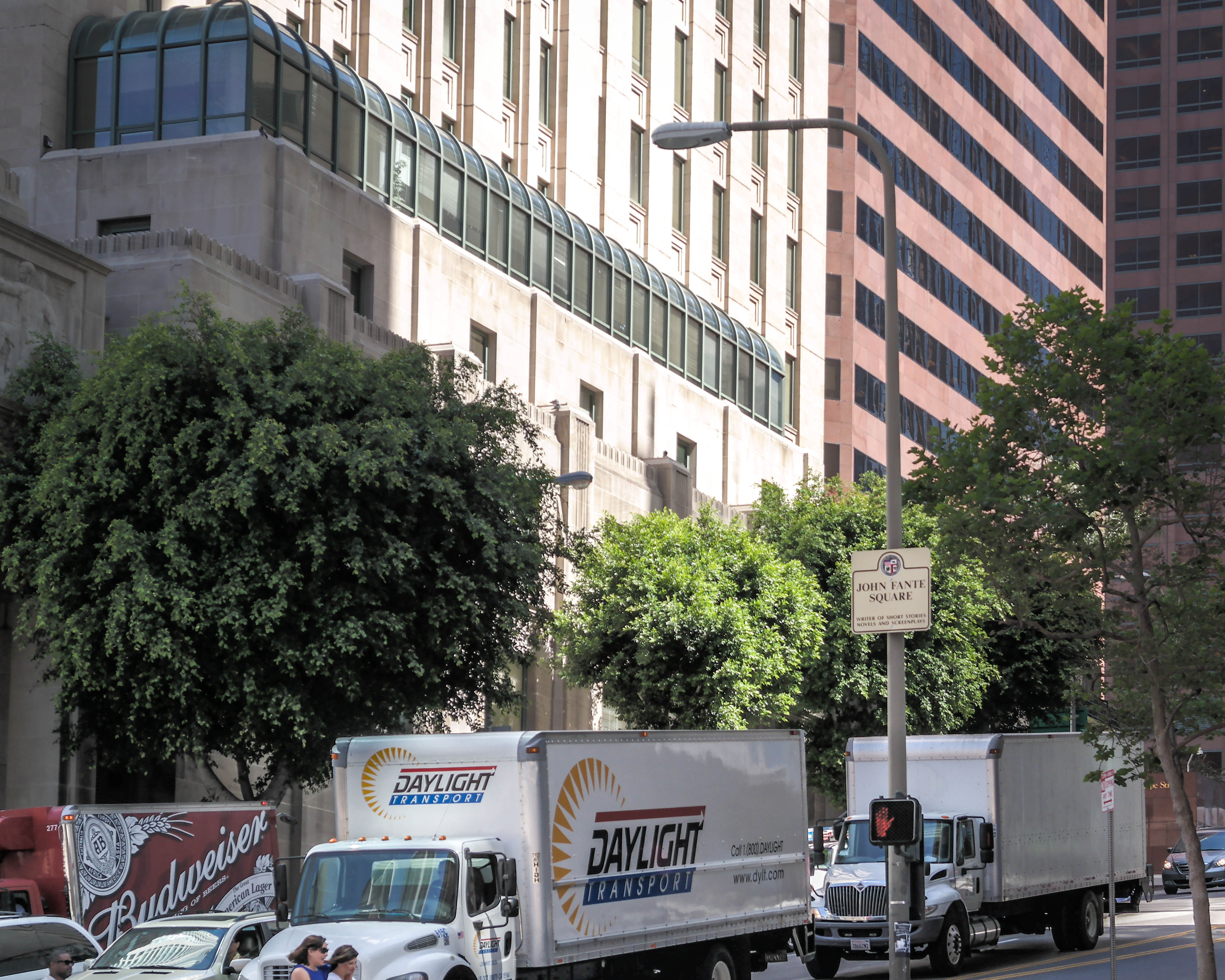
A view of John Fante Square in downtown Los Angeles

He is one of the first to portray the tough times of writers in Los Angeles and has been referred to as "the quintessential L.A. novelist." He has also been cited as a precursor to Beat writers. Robert Towne has called Ask the Dust the greatest novel ever written about Los Angeles. Michael Tolkin said the novel should be "mandatory reading" in the Los Angeles school system. More than 60 years after it was published, Ask the Dust appeared for several weeks on the New York Times' Best Sellers List.

Fante's work and style have influenced Charles Bukowski, who stated in his introduction to Ask the Dust that "Fante was my god". Bukowski dedicated poems to Fante, and in the early part of his career was said to go around shouting, "I am Arturo Bandini!" in reference to Fante's alter ego. In his 1978 novel Women, Bukowski's alter ego Henry Chinaski is asked to name his favorite author; he replies, "Fante."

Fante wrote about writing, about people he knew, and about places where he lived and worked, which included Wilmington, Long Beach, Manhattan Beach, the Bunker Hill district of downtown Los Angeles Hollywood, Echo Park and Malibu. Recurring themes in Fante's work are poverty, Catholicism, family life, Italian-American identity, sports, and racism. Kristopher Cook proposes a concentration on themes of "existentialism; philosophy – finding the meaning of life through free will, choice, and personal concern". Neil Gordon suggests Fante's works exude a "profound urge to realize an artistic talent and an equally profound anxiety about recognition in the literary market". Fante's clear voice, vivid characters, shoot-from-the-hip style, and painful, emotional honesty blended with humor and scrupulous self-criticism give his books wide appreciation. Most of his novels and stories take place in Colorado or California. Some of his novels and short stories feature or focus on fictional incarnations of Fante's father, Nicola Fante, as a cantankerous, wine tippling, cigar stub-smoking bricklayer.

In 1987, Fante was posthumously awarded the PEN USA President's Award.

On October 13, 2009, Los Angeles City Council member Jan Perry put forward a motion, seconded by Jose Huizar, that the intersection of Fifth Street and Grand Avenue be designated John Fante Square. The site is outside the Los Angeles Central Library frequented by the young Fante, and where Charles Bukowski discovered Ask The Dust. On April 8, 2010, the author's 101st birthday, the Fante Square sign was unveiled in a noon ceremony attended by Fante's family, fans and city officials. Fante Square is located near the old Bunker Hill neighborhood he wrote about, and where he also lived.

== Film and theater adaptations ==
Francis Ford Coppola bought the rights to The Brotherhood of the Grape, but a film was not produced. Dominique Deruddere directed the movie version of Wait Until Spring, Bandini, which was released in 1989. In March 2006, Paramount Pictures released Ask the Dust, directed by Robert Towne and starring Colin Farrell, Salma Hayek and Donald Sutherland. In December 2006, a 2001 documentary film about Fante, A Sad Flower in the Sand (directed by Jan Louter), aired on the PBS series Independent Lens. Yvan Attal directed and starred in the French film My Dog Stupid (Mon chien Stupide), released in October 2019, based on the story of the same name in West of Rome.

On January 18, 2001, the play 1933 by Randal Myler and Brockman Seawell, based on Fante's novel 1933 Was a Bad Year, premiered at the Denver Center for the Performing Arts.

== Writings ==
=== Novels ===
- The Road to Los Angeles (1936, published posthumously in 1985) (Bandini Quartet: 2)
- Wait Until Spring, Bandini (1938) (Bandini Quartet: 1)
- Ask the Dust (1939) (Bandini Quartet: 3)
- Full of Life (1952)
- Bravo, Burro! (1970, with Rudolph Borchert)
- The Brotherhood of the Grape (1977)
- Dreams from Bunker Hill (1982) (Bandini Quartet: 4)
- 1933 Was a Bad Year (posthumously, 1985; incomplete)

=== Novellas ===
- West of Rome (posthumously, 1986)

=== Short story collections ===
- Dago Red (1940)
- The Wine of Youth: Selected Stories (1985)
- The Big Hunger: Stories, 1932–1959 (2000)
- The John Fante Reader (2003, edited by Stephen Cooper)

=== Letters ===
- Fante/Mencken: John Fante & H. L. Mencken: A Personal Correspondence, 1930–1952 (1989)
- Prologue to Ask the Dust (1990)
- John Fante: Selected Letters, 1932–1981 (1991)
